= Marco D'Arienzo =

Italian opera librettist

Marco D'Arienzo (Naples, 24 April 1811 – 24 April 1877) was an Italian opera librettist.

D'Arienzo was a professional state official and, at the same time, a writer and librettist. From 1834 to 1837 he worked as a journalist for the Neapolitan newspaper L'Omnibus and was also author of Neapolitan songs, many of which were set to music by Saverio Mercadante. His comic librettos have been described as "witty and well presented" in spite of their involved plots.

Marco D'Arienzo was uncle of the composer Nicola D'Arienzo.

== Libretti by D'Arienzo ==
| Title | Genre | Acts | Composer | Première | Place, theatre |
|---|---|---|---|---|---|
| Il conte di Saverna | melodramma | 2 acts | Paolo Fabrizi | 1837 | Naples, Teatro Nuovo |
| Il feudatario di Margate | melodramma | 2 acts | Giovanni Moretti | 1839 | Naples, Teatro Nuovo |
| Il portatore d'acqua | melodramma | 3 acts | Paolo Fabrizi | Autumn 1840 | Naples, Teatro Nuovo |
| Il proscritto | melodramma | 3 acts | Mario Aspa | Autumn 1841 | Naples, Teatro Nuovo |
| Guglielmo Colmann | melodramma | 3 acts | Mario Aspa | Winter 1842 | Naples, Teatro Nuovo |
| Gli zingari o Gli amori di Pulcinella | commedia per musica | 3 acts | Vincenzo Fioravanti | Carnival 1844 | Naples, Teatro Nuovo |
| Leonora | melodramma | 4 acts | Saverio Mercadante | 5 December 1844 | Naples, Teatro Nuovo |
| Il figlio dello schiavo | melodramma | 3 acts | Giuseppe Puzone | 1845 | Naples, Teatro del Fondo |
| Chi cenerà | commedia per musica | 1 act | Vincenzo Fioravanti | Carnival 1845 | Rome, Teatro Argentina |
| Un imbarazzo per la padrona e la cameriera (revision of Chi cenerà) | commedia per musica | 2 acts | Vincenzo Fioravanti | 1848 | Naples, Teatro Nuovo |
| Le due guide | melodramma | 4 acts | Nicola De Giosa | 1848 | Livorno, Teatro degli Avvalorati |
| Policarpio | commedia per musica | 2 acts | Giovanni Moretti | Summer 1849 | Naples, Teatro Nuovo |
| Delfina | melodramma | 3 acts | Giuseppe Lillo | March 1850 | Naples, Teatro Nuovo |
| Una bottega di caffè | commedia per musica | 1 act | Aniello Barbati | 1859 | Naples, Teatro Nuovo |
| Le precauzioni (Il carnevale di Venezia) | opera buffa | 3 acts | Errico Petrella | 20 May 1851 | Naples, Teatro Nuovo |
| Piedigrotta (La festa di Piedigrotta) | commedia per musica (opera buffa napoletana) | 4 acts | Luigi Ricci | 23 June 1852 | Naples, Teatro Nuovo |
| La figlia del pilota | melodramma | 3 acts | Raffaele Giannetti | August 1852 | Naples, Teatro Nuovo |
| Violetta | melodramma | 4 acts | Saverio Mercadante | 10 January 1853 | Naples, Teatro Nuovo |
| Gismondo Rethel | melodramma | 3 acts | Giuseppe Benzi | Carnival 1853 | Crema |
| L'alchimista | melodramma | 3 acts | Lauro Rossi | 23 August 1853 | Naples, Teatro del Fondo |
| Il marinaio di Nisida | azione melodrammatica | | Antonio Candeloro | 1854 | Naples, San Pietro a Maiella Conservatory |
| Il festino | commedia per musica | 3 acts | Giovanni Moretti | January 1854 | Naples, Teatro Nuovo |
| La colomba di Barcellona | melodramma | 3 acts | Raffaele Giannetti | Lent 1855 | Naples, Teatro Nuovo |
| Il traviato | azione melodrammatica | 3 acts | Beniamino Carelli, Ernesto Viceconte, Giovanni Mensitieri, Claudio Conti, Luigi Vespoli | 1855 | Naples, Conservatory |
| Pelagio | tragedia lirica | 4 acts | Saverio Mercadante | 12 February 1857 | Naples, Teatro San Carlo |
| La cantante | melodramma | 3 acts | Luigi Vespoli | 1858 | Naples, Teatro del Fondo |
| Ser Pomponio | commedia per musica | 2 acts | Ferdinando Tommasi | Autumn 1859 | Naples, Teatro Nuovo |
| La figlia del marinaio | melodramma | 4 acts | Claudio Conti | Spring 1866 | Naples, Teatro Bellini |
| La contessa di Mons | melodramma | 4 acts | Lauro Rossi | 18 January 1874 | Turin, Teatro Regio |
| Cleopatra | tragedia lirica | 4 acts | Lauro Rossi | 5 March 1876 | Turin, Teatro Regio |
| Napoli di carnevale | opera giocosa | 3 acts | Nicola De Giosa | 1877 | Naples, Teatro Nuovo |
| Maria Menzikoff | melodramma | 5 acts | Ferruccio Ferrari | Spring 1877 | Reggio Emilia, Teatro Municipale |
