= Il fortunato inganno =

Opera by Gaetano Donizetti

- Opera buffa by Gaetano Donizetti
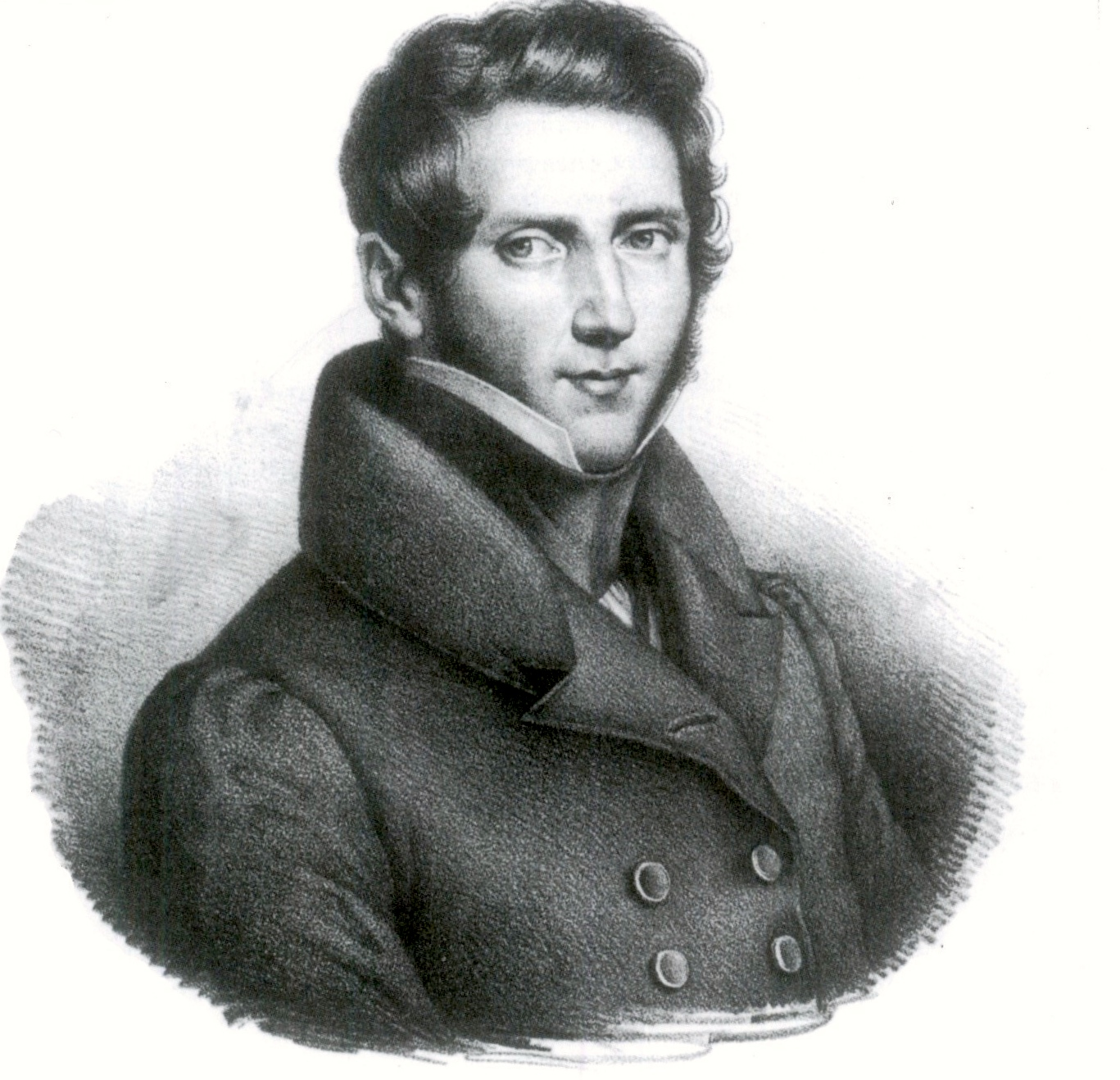
- Donizetti as a young man
- Librettist: Andrea Leone Tottola
- Language: Italian
- Premiere: 3 September 1822; Teatro Nuovo, Naples

Il fortunato inganno (The Happy Deception) is an opera buffa in two acts by Gaetano Donizetti, to a libretto by Andrea Leone Tottola. Composed in 1823, it was first given on September 3 of that year at the Teatro Nuovo in Naples. It was not a success, and has disappeared from the repertory.

== Composition ==
Donizetti composed the opera during the summer of 1823, during which time his Alfredo il grande was in rehearsals at the Teatro San Carlo. It failed after three performances, and was not seen again for many years. A production was mounted in July 1995 at the Vadstena Academy conducted by Michael Bartosch and with Ann Hallenberg among the cast. It was revived in 1998 by the Festival della Valle d'Itria, a performance which has been recorded. In September 2026, Pacific Opera Project produced its U.S. premiere in Los Angeles.

The opera's musical numbers are separated by spoken dialogue.

== Roles ==
Role	Voice type	Interpreter at premiere (September 3, 1823)
Lattanzio Lattrughelli, primo buffo and director of a company of singers	basso buffo	Carlo Casaccia
Aurelia, his wife, prima donna and lead actress	soprano	Teresa Melas
Ortensio Franceschetti, a colonel	bass	Giuseppe Fioravanti
Edoardo, a cavalry lieutenant, his nephew	tenor	Marco Venier
Eugenia, pupil of Lattanzio and niece of Aurelia	soprano	D'Auria
Fulgenzia del Folletto, seconda donna	soprano	
Fiordelisa, actress	mezzo-soprano	
Bequadro, maestro di cappella of the company	bass	
Vulcano, poet for the company	tenor	
Biscaglino, bass of the company	bass	
Ascanio, servant of Lattanzio	bass	
Chorus of the company

== Plot ==
The opera takes place in Italy, sometime during the nineteenth century.

Lattanzio Lattrughelli's opera company is in the process of rehearsing a new work, with the usual mishaps. His wife's niece, Eugenia, is in love with a young cavalry lieutenant, Edoardo, who loves her back. But his uncle, Colonel Franceschetti, refuses to consent to the marriage of his nephew with an actress. Aurelia, Eugenia's aunt and Lattanzio's wife, pretends to be a countess, and in the "happy deception" of the title, deceives the Colonel into believing she loves him, and in so doing persuades him to accept the union of the two young people. When he finds out that he has been tricked, the Colonel reacts angrily before agreeing to their wedding, and all ends happily.

== Recordings ==
A recording of the opera made during its performances at the Festival dalla Valle d'Istria was released by Dynamic in 1999. Its cast includes Domenico Colaianni, Stefania Donzelli, Magali Damonte, Eun-Joo Lee, Madia Todisco, and Nicolas Rivenq, under the direction of Arnold Bosman.
