= Giuseppe Fioravanti =

Italian opera singer

Giuseppe Fioravanti (c. 1795 – ?) was an Italian opera singer active during the first half of the 19th century. Although one of the most important and popular basso buffos of his generation, there is only a relatively small amount of information available about his life. He had a highly fruitful partnership with the Teatro Nuovo in Naples and is best known today for creating roles in the world premieres of numerous operas by Gaetano Donizetti.

== Biography ==
Fioravanti was the son of opera composer Valentino Fioravanti (1764–1837) and the older brother of opera composer Vincenzo Fioravanti (1799–1877). His exact year of birth is unknown but it is likely that he was born sometime around 1795. Not much is known about his musical training, although he probably received some education from his father.

Fioravanti's first known stage appearance was in 1817 at the Teatro del Corso in Bologna as Masetto in Wolfgang Amadeus Mozart's Don Giovanni. He repeated that role for his debut at the Teatro della Pergola in Florence a year later. In 1818 he was committed to the Teatro San Luca in Venice where he sang Brunone in the world premiere of Gaetano Donizetti's Enrico di Borgogna; notably that composer's first opera to be staged. He sang in several performances at La Scala in 1819-1820, notably portraying Capellio in the world premiere of Gioachino Rossini's Bianca e Falliero (1819), Robert Bruce in the premiere of Giovanni Pacini's Vallace, o L'eroe scozzese (1820), and a part in the premiere of Michele Carafa's I due Figaro (1820). In 1821 he appeared at the Teatro Apollo in Rome as Aliprando in the first performance of Rossini's Matilde di Shabran.

In 1822 Fioravanti joined the roster of principal singers at the Teatro Nuovo in Naples. That house remained his primary home for the remainder of his career. He appeared in several world premieres in operas by Donizetti at that house, including Don Sebastiano Alvarez in La zingara (1822), Ortenzio in Il fortunato inganno (1823), Claudio di Liverpool in Emilia di Liverpool (1824), Iwano in Otto mesi in due ore (1827), and Max in Betly (1836). In 1825 he sang in the first performance of Saverio Mercadante's Il signore del villaggio, a revised version of his 1824 opera Il podestà di Burgos. In 1824 he sang in the premiere of his father's opera Ogni eccesso è vizioso and appeared at the Teatro Nuovo in the premiere of his brother's opera, Il Pirata, in 1849. He also sang there in the world premieres of Don Checco in 1850 and L'atrabilare in 1856.

Fioravanti also appeared at the Teatro di San Carlo in Naples on a number of occasions during his career. At that house he portrayed Blinval in the premiere of Donizetti's I pazzi per progetto (1830) and Meledor in the premiere of Mercadante 's Zaira (1831) among other roles. His repertoire also included a large number of parts in operas by Julius Benedict, François-Adrien Boieldieu, Antonio Cagnoni, Pacini, Errico Petrella, and Lauro Rossi. The date of his death is unknown. His two sons, Valentino Fioravanti (1827–79) and Luigi Fioravanti (1829–87), also had successful opera careers as basso buffos.
