= Almerindo Spadetta =

Italian opera librettist (c.1822–1894)

- Born: c. 1822; Naples, Kingdom of the Two Sicilies
- Died: April 1894; San Giovanni a Teduccio, Italy
- Occupations: librettist; stage manager

Almerindo Spadetta (c. 1822—April 1894) was a prolific opera librettist active in Naples. He worked as a stage manager at the Teatro San Carlo, Teatro Nuovo, and Teatro del Fondo in Naples for over 40 years and wrote numerous libretti (mostly in the opera buffa genre) for composers associated with those theatres. His most enduring work was the libretto for Nicola De Giosa's Don Checco, one of the last great successes in the history of Neapolitan opera buffa.

Spadetta was a lawyer by training and apparently spent some of his career in Malta, but little else has been written about his life. According to his obituary in the Gazzetta Musicale di Milano, he spent his last years in San Giovanni a Teduccio, a small town in the suburbs of Naples. He died there in 1894, long-forgotten and in dire poverty.

== Libretti ==
Spadetta's libretti include:

- Elvina (opera semiseria in 3 acts); composed by Nicola De Giosa; premiered Teatro Nuovo, Naples, 1845
- Pulcinella e la fortuna, (azione allegorica in 5 acts), composed by Vincenzo Fioravanti; premiered Teatro Nuovo, Naples, 24 January 1847
- Carlotta e Werter (opera semiseria in 2 acts); composed by Mario Aspa; premiered Teatro Nuovo, Naples, 1849
- Il pirata, (opera buffa in 5 acts; composed by Vincenzo Fioravanti; premiered Teatro Nuovo, Naples, 1849
- Don Checco (opera buffa in 2 acts); composed by Nicola De Giosa premiered Teatro Nuovo, Naples, 1850
- Il coscritto (melodramma in 4 parts); composed by Mario Aspa; premiered Teatro del Fondo, Naples, 1851
- Il signor Pipino (opera buffa in 3 acts) composed by Vincenzo Fioravanti; premiered Teatro Nuovo, Naples, 1856
- Cicco e Cola (opera buffa in 4 acts); composed by Alfonso Buonomo; premiered Teatro Nuovo, Naples, 1857
- I due mariti (commedia lirica in 3 acts); composed by Nicola D'Arienzo; premiered Teatro Bellini, Naples, 1 February 1866
- Tizio, Cajo e Sempronio (opera buffa in 3 acts); composed by Alfonso Buonomo; premiered Teatro Fenice, Naples, 1867
- Le rose (commedia lirica in 3 acts); composed by Nicola D'Arienzo; premiered Teatro Bellini, Naples, February 1868
- Il cacciatore delle Alpi (azione semiseria in 1 act); composed by Nicola D'Arienzo; premiered Teatrino del Collegio dei Nobili, Naples, 23 June 1870
- Zorilla (melodramma giocoso in 3 acts); composed by Antonio Nani; premiered Teatro Rossini, Naples, 1872
- Il cuoco e il segretario (opera buffa in 3 acts, after Eugène Scribe); composed by Nicola D'Arienzo; premiered Teatro Rossini, Naples, 11 January 1873
- I viaggi (commedia lirica in 3 acts); composed by Nicola D'Arienzo; premiered Teatro Castelli, Milan, 23 June 1875.
