= Matteo Fischetti =

Italian pianist and composer

- Born: Matteo Luigi Fischetti; 28 February 1830; Martina Franca, Kingdom of the Two Sicilies
- Died: December 1887; Naples, Italy
- Occupations: pianist; composer

Matteo Fischetti (28 February 1830 – December 1887) was an Italian pianist and composer active in Naples.

== Life and career ==
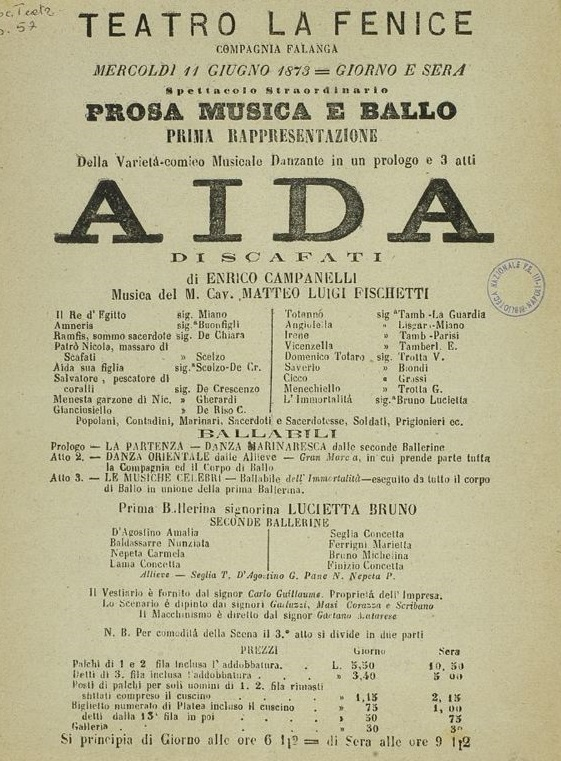
Poster for the premiere of Fischetti's Aida di Scafati

Born in Martina Franca, Fischetti studied piano from the age of six in his native city. He was then sent to Naples to study piano under Michele Cerimele and composition under a number of teachers including Giovanni Moretti and Giuseppe Lillo. He composed over 200 pieces of instrumental and vocal music as well as three operas, all of which premiered in Naples.

When the composer Vincenzo Fioravanti fell on hard times, a group of his friends produced the Album Fioravanti in 1864 at their own cost to be sold for his benefit. Compiled by Fischetti, it contained a biography of Fioravanti and facsimile reproductions of the autograph scores for three of his unpublished arias as well as pieces donated by Fischetti and his fellow composer Nicola De Giosa.

Fischetti's most popular opera was Aida di Scafati (Aida of Scafati), a parody of Verdi's Aida. It was performed over 100 times in Naples and revived in other Italian cities for many years. It was given its first performance in modern times in October 2014 in a production organized by the Conservatory of San Pietro a Majella. In his later years Fischetti also taught piano and composition. He died in Naples at the age of 57.

== Operas ==
- Aida di Scafati (comic opera in a prologue and three acts); libretto by Enrico Campanelli; premiered Teatro Fenice, Naples, 11 June 1873
- La sorrentina (comic opera in three acts); libretto by Ernesto La Pegna; premiered Teatro Fenice, Naples, 6 September 1873
- Un'altra figlia di Madama Angot (comic opera in three acts); libretto by Enrico Campanelli; premiered Teatro Mercadante, Naples, 17 May 1874
