= La zingara =

Opera by Gaetano Donizetti

- Opera semiseria by Gaetano Donizetti
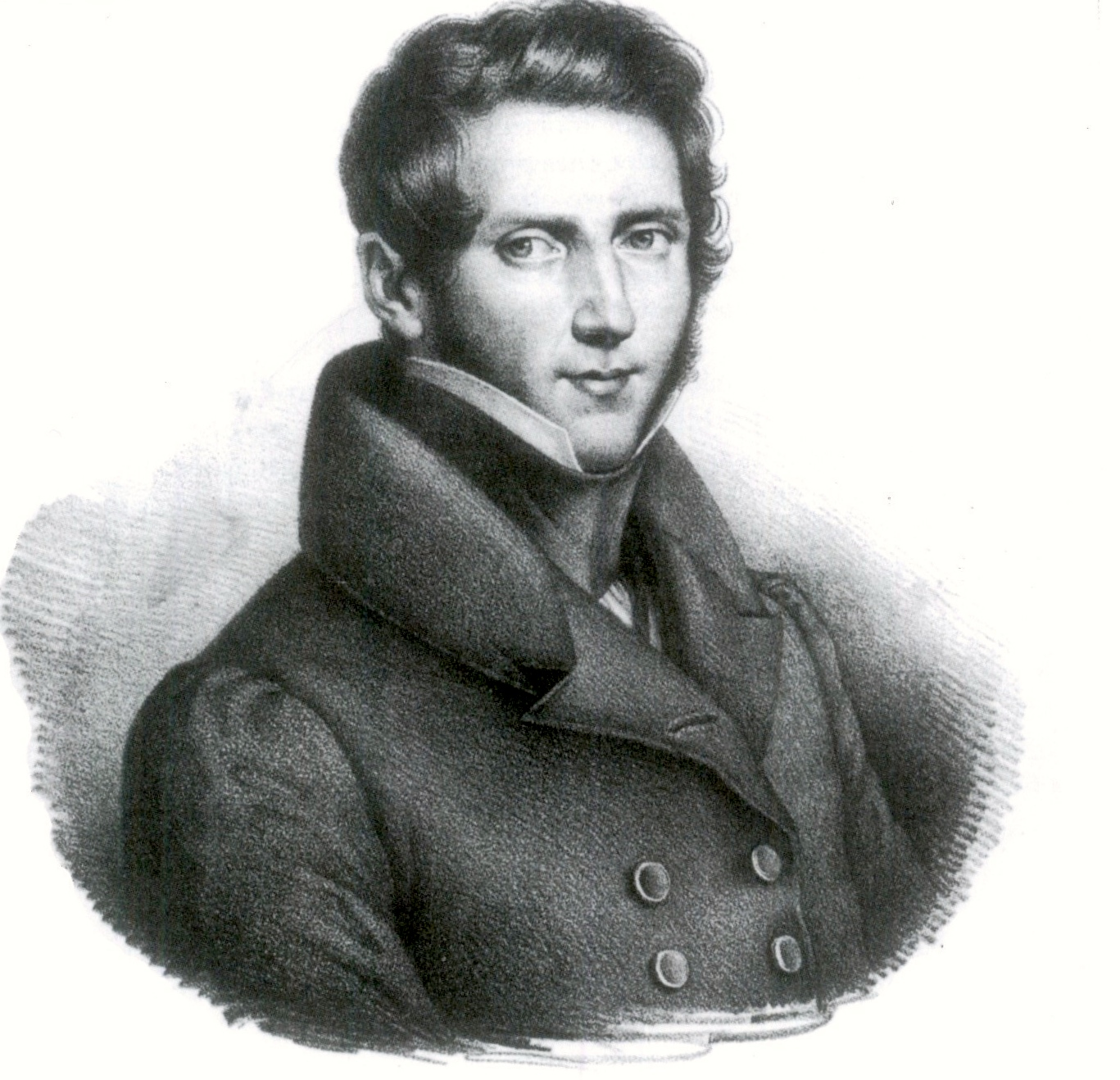
- Donizetti as a young man
- Librettist: Andrea Leone Tottola
- Language: Italian
- Based on: La petite bohémienne by Louis-Charles Caigniez
- Premiere: 12 May 1822; Teatro Nuovo (Naples)

La zingara (The Gypsy Girl) is an opera semiseria in two acts by Gaetano Donizetti, set to a libretto by Andrea Leone Tottola after La petite bohémienne (The Little Gypsy) by Louis-Charles Caigniez, which was itself derived from a work of August von Kotzebue.

It was Donizetti's first opera written for Naples, and the first performance of this "rescue opera" took place at the Teatro Nuovo on 12 May 1822.

One critic reviewing the 2001 recording from the Festival della Valle d'Itria, made the following observations:

Despite its moronic libretto, the opera was an enormous success at its premiere in Naples in 1822, and even Bellini wrote nice things about the second-act septet in which Donizetti mixes buffo and serious characters, as well as Neapolitan dialect (there are no recitatives; numbers are separated by spoken dialogue) with "pure" Italian, and the absurd plot is (sort of) held together by the clever Argilla, who under the guise of telling fortunes gains entry to people's feelings as well as to every area of the castle. Is it a masterpiece? Even close? No, but there are niceties galore—rhythmic arias and ensembles, good (if typical) characterizations, and good tunes.

Its American premiere was produced by Amore Opera in New York City in 2017.

== Roles ==
Role	Voice type	Premiere cast, 12 May 1822 (Conductor: – )
Argilla	mezzo-soprano	Giacinta Canonici
Ines	soprano	Caterina Monticelli
Fernando	tenor	Marco Venier
Don Ranuccio Zappador	bass	Carlo Moncada
Don Sebastiano Alvarez	bass	Giuseppe Fioravanti
Duca d'Alziras	tenor	Alessandro Busti
Papaccione	basso buffo	Carlo Casaccia
Amelia	soprano	Francesca Ceccherini
Ghita	soprano	Clementina Grassi
Manuelita	soprano	Marianna Grassi
Antonio Alvarez	baritone	Raffaele Sarti
Sguiglio	baritone	Raffaele Casaccia
Domestici di Zappador e di zingari, chorus

== Synopsis ==
Time: The middle ages
Place: Spain

Don Ranuccio has imprisoned Don Sebastiano in his castle and he also wants to kill the Duke of Alziras, his political rival. Ranuccio's daughter Ines is in love with Fernando, but her father wants her to marry Antonio who is Don Sebastiano's nephew.

Argilla, the gypsy girl of the title, brings together the lovers Ferrando and Ines, saves the life of the Duke, whom she brings together again with his brother, and frees Don Sebastiano, who turns out to be her father. Comedy is provided by the servant Pappacione, fooled into searching for gold in an old cistern. All ends happily.

== Recordings ==
Year	Cast (Argilla, Ines, Fernando, Don Sebastiano Alvarez, Duca d'Alziras)	Conductor, Opera House and Orchestra	Label
2001	Manuela Custer, Rosita Ramini, Massimiliano Barbolini, Piero Terranova, Cataldo Gallone	Arnold Bosman, Orchestra Internazionale d'Italia and Bratislava Chamber Chorus (Recorded at the Festival della Valle d'Itria, Martina Franca, July)	CD: Dynamic; Cat: CDS396/1-2
