= D'Arienzo =

D'Arienzo is an Italian surname. Notable people with the surname include:

- Juan d'Arienzo (1900–1976), Argentine musician
- Marco D'Arienzo (1811–1877), Italian opera librettist
- Nicola D'Arienzo (1842–1915), Italian composer

== See also ==
- Arienzo
