= Buonomo =

Buonomo is an Italian surname. Notable people with the surname include:

- Alfonso Buonomo (1829–1903), Italian composer
- Antonio Buonomo (1932–2025), Italian composer, solo percussionist, and music educator
- Jeannette Ramos Buonomo (1932–2021), Puerto Rican judge
- Joseph Buonomo (born 1943), American entrepreneur
- Brian Buonomo, Engineering Technology Educator at West Islip High School
