= Mario Aspa =

Italian composer

- Born: 17 October 1797; Messina, Italy
- Died: 14 December 1868 (aged 71); Messina, Italy
- Occupation: composer

Mario Aspa (17 October 1797 – 14 December 1868) was an Italian composer. He composed over 40 operas, the most successful of which were Paolo e Virginia (premiered in Rome, 1843) and II Muratore di Napoli (premiered in Naples, 1850). He also composed two ballets and a Requiem Mass which was performed on the death of Vittorio Emmanuele II in 1878.

== Operas ==
Aspa's operas included:

- Giovanni Bannier (melodramma in 2 acts); libretto by Domenico Gilardoni; premiered Teatro del Fondo, Naples, 1829
- Il carcere d'Ildegonda (melodramma in 2 acts); libretto by Domenico Gilardoni; premiered Aspa, Teatro Nuovo, Naples, 1830
- Il proscritto (melodramma in 3 acts); libretto by Marco D'Arienzo; premiered Teatro Nuovo, Naples, 1841
- Paolo e Virginia (opera semiseria in 2 acts); libretto by Jacopo Ferretti; premiered Teatro Metastasio, Rome, 1843
- Carlotta e Werter (opera semiseria in 2 acts); libretto by Almerindo Spadetta; premiered Teatro Nuovo, Naples, 1849
- II Muratore di Napoli (opera semiseria in 3 acts); libretto by Domenico Bolognese; premiered Teatro Nuovo, Naples, 1850
- Il coscritto (melodramma in 4 parts); libretto by Almerindo Spadetta; premiered Teatro del Fondo, Naples, 1851
