= Emilia di Liverpool =

Opera by Gaetano Donizetti

- Opera by Gaetano Donizetti
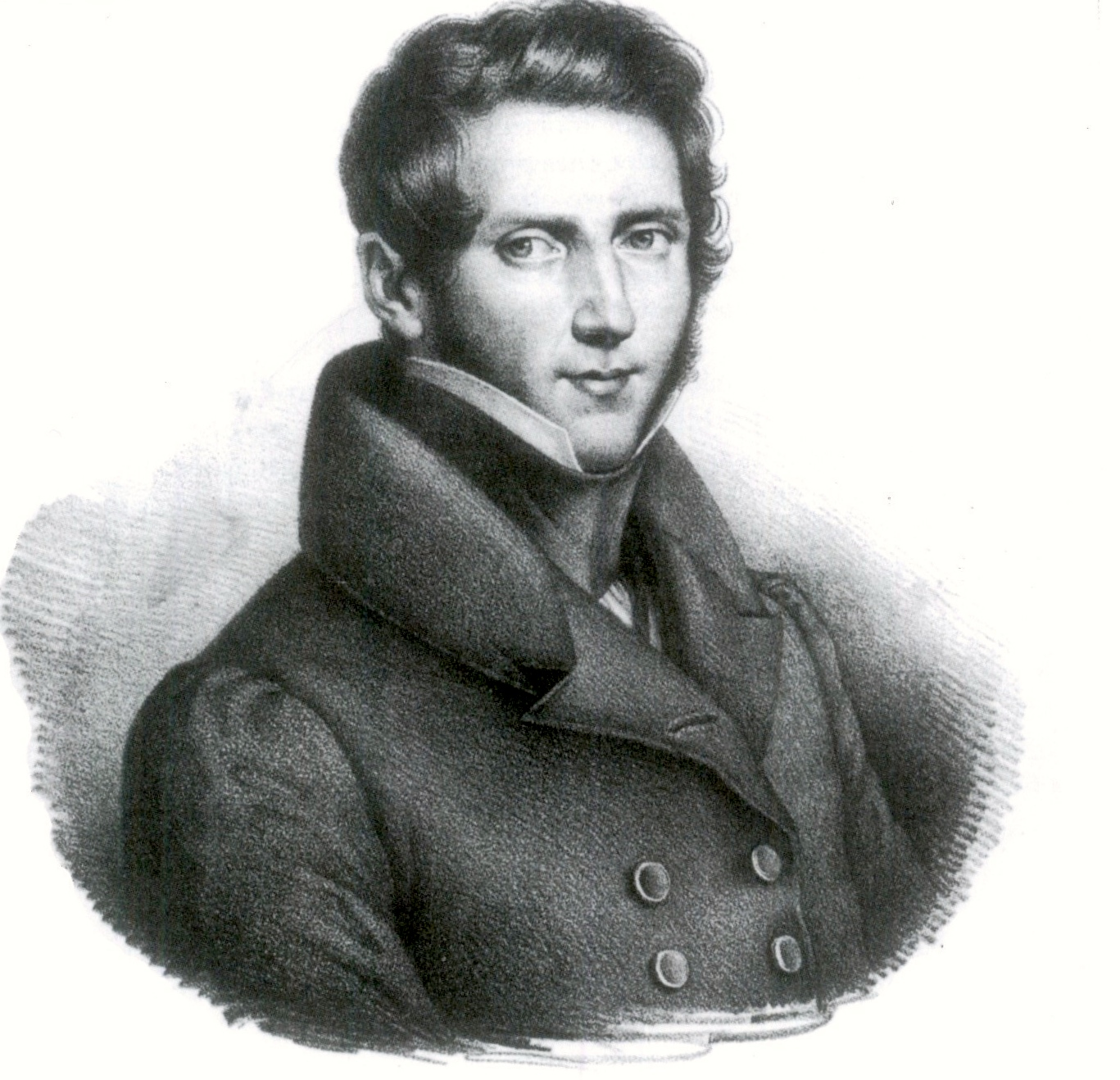
- Donizetti as a young man
- Librettist: Giuseppe Checcherini
- Language: Italian
- Based on: Stefano Scatizzi's play
- Premiere: 28 July 1824; Teatro Nuovo, Naples

Emilia di Liverpool (Emilia of Liverpool; also given as L'eremitaggio di Liverpool) is a dramma semiseria, ("half-serious") dramatic opera, in two acts with music by Gaetano Donizetti. Giuseppe Checcherini wrote the Italian libretto after the anonymous libretto for Vittorio Trento's Emilia di Laverpaut, itself based on Stefano Scatizzi's play of the same name. It premiered on 28 July 1824 at the Teatro Nuovo in Naples.

== Composition history ==
The libretto had a complex history. The original story by Scatizzi formed the basis of the first, anonymous libretto of 1824, which had the title of Emilia di Liverpool. This first libretto included the introduction of the Count, a Neapolitan character, as comic relief per the theatrical tradition of the Teatro Nuovo. The changes to the cast of characters caused confusion among the relationships of the characters and ran contrary to the structure of the original play. The libretto revisions by Checcherini, circa 1828, removed much of the material of the 1824 version, with further revisions to the characters, but maintaining the plot chronology of the 1824 version. The 1828 revision, known as L'eremitaggio di Liverpool (The Hermitage of Liverpool), also reduced the amount of spoken dialogue.

== Performance history ==
The 1828 version was given its premiere in Naples on 8 March 1828 and received only six performances. The 1824 version "was revived in 1838 for three performances, and again in 1871".

It was not until 1957 that it received another presentation of any kind, until its UK premiere on 12 June in Liverpool. In September 1957 the BBC presented an abridged radio version which starred the young Joan Sutherland, "who gave a stunning exhibition of her Donizetti style a good eighteen months before her Covent Garden success in Lucia di Lammermoor.

== Roles ==
Role	Voice type	Premiere Cast, 28 July 1824 (Conductor: - )
Emilia	soprano	Teresa Melas
Claudio di Liverpool, her father	bass	Giuseppe Fioravanti
Federico	tenor	Domenico Zilioli
Don Romualdo	bass	Carlo Casaccia
Candida, his daughter	mezzo-soprano	Francesca Ceccherini
Luigia	soprano	
Il conte	bass	
Villains

== Synopsis ==
Time: The past
Place: A village near Liverpool

Emilia, daughter of Claudio, the "Count of Liverpool", lives in a hermitage doing good works among the people of Liverpool. Years earlier she had rejected the noble Don Romualdo to elope with Federico. But Federico merely seduced and abandoned her. Her mother died of shame and her father disappeared in pursuit of his daughter's seducer. Since that time, Emilia had lived a holy life of penitence and charity, but years later, Emilia's charitable work is disturbed by the arrival of two strangers who have been stranded in a storm. One is Federico, now repentant; the other is Claudio who had been captured by Barbary pirates and imprisoned for many years. A third man, her former suitor Don Romualdo, also appears.

Don Romualdo is still willing to marry Emilia, but she rejects him. Federico attempts to prove that he is repentant, but Claudio challenges him to a duel with pistols. The two men begin to fight, but are stopped by Emilia who is able to prevent them from firing any shots. She announces her belief that Federico is reformed, says that they are in love, and that they plan to marry. Everyone rejoices.

== Recordings ==
Year	Cast: (Emilia, Candida, Luigia, Don Romualdo, Claudio di Liverpool, Federico)	Conductor, Opera House and Orchestra	Label
1986	Yvonne Kenny, Anne Mason, Bronwen Mills, Sesto Bruscantini, Geoffrey Dolton, Chris Merritt	David Parry, Philharmonia Orchestra and Geoffrey Mitchell Choir	Audio CD: Opera Rara; Cat: ORC 8
