= Betly =

Opera by Gaetano Donizetti

- Opera by Gaetano Donizetti
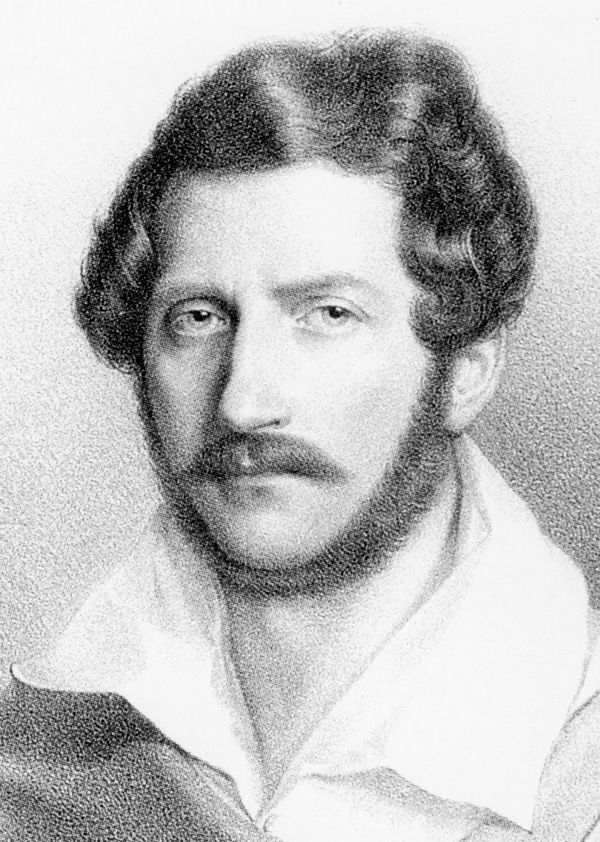
- Gaetano Donizetti c. 1835
- Librettist: Donizetti
- Language: Italian
- Premiere: 24 August 1836; Teatro Nuovo, Naples

Betly, ossia La capanna svizzera ("Betly, or The Swiss Chalet") is a dramma giocoso in two acts (originally one) by the Italian composer Gaetano Donizetti. The composer wrote the Italian libretto after Eugène Scribe and Mélésville's libretto for Adolphe Adam's opéra comique Le chalet, in its turn based on Goethe's Singspiel Jery und Bätely (1779).

== Performance history ==
The opera premiered at the Teatro Nuovo in Naples on 24 August 1836. The initial performance was not well-received due to the vocal decline of Giuseppe Fioravanti, the performer of the baritone role. However, the revision prepared by Donizetti for subsequent performances was a marked success. This success prompted the composer to expand the opera from one act to two acts. The two-act version of Betly was first presented on 29 September 1837 at the Teatro del Fondo, Naples. Other Italian cities, where performances of the opera were given, include: Palermo in 1837, Florence in 1838, Bologna in 1845, Venice in 1851, and Messina in 1859. The opera was also performed in Lisbon in 1837, in Madrid in 1842, and in Barcelona in 1844. It was transformed into a Spanish zarzuela, Propósito de mujer, by Emilio Álvarez in 1864 and presented the same year in Madrid.

The first American performance of the complete opera took place on 25 October 1861 in Philadelphia, followed by the one on 28 October 1861 in New York City; fragments of the opera were heard in concerts already in 1840s. One notable performance in London was on 9 January 1838, with Frederick Lablache singing the baritone role; the English adaptation of Betly was presented there for the first time in 1841.

The French adaptation, prepared by Hippolyte-Julien-Joseph Lucas after the death of the composer, with additional music written by Adolphe Adam, premiered in Paris in 1853, but had little success.

The opera was staged sporadically in the 20th and 21st centuries: in Bergamo in 1948, 1968, 1993, and 2014; in Fermo in 1988; in Lugo in 1990; in Lugano in 1933; in London in 1954 and 1995; and in Berlin (the German premiere) in 2015 in a semi-staged performance by Berliner Operngruppe. In "a double-bill of the same opera by different composers", Le Chalet by Adam was performed before Betly on the same evening at the Stadttheater Solothurn in October 2023 during the 2023-24 season.

== Roles ==
Roles, voice types, premiere cast
Role	Voice type	Premiere cast, 24 August 1836
Daniele, young landowner	tenor	Lorenzo Salvi
Max, Swiss sergeant	baritone	Giuseppe Fioravanti
Betly, Max's sister	soprano	Adelaide Tosi
Swiss peasants and soldiers

== Synopsis ==
The synopsis below refers to the two-act version of the opera following the Casa Ricordi edition of its libretto current in the 20th century.

Time: 18th century
Place: Appenzell, Switzerland

Daniele Birman, a young Swiss landowner, is in love with Betly, a beautiful and independent girl, who, however, doesn't return his feelings. As the opera begins, the inhabitants of Appenzell have prepared for a joke a fake love letter from Betly to Daniele, accepting his marriage proposal. The young man is elated and invites the villagers to his wedding celebrations. Soon after, Betly arrives and discovers the situation. Even though she momentarily feels pity for Daniele, she dashes his hopes and resolutely rejects his pleas for marriage.

Sad Daniele stumbles upon a troop of Swiss soldiers under the command of Sergeant Max Starner, and out of desperation tries to enlist in the army. Daniele confides in Max, not realizing he is Betly's brother gone from the Canton of Appenzell for fifteen years, to whom he has recently sent a letter informing of his intention to marry Betly, and whose encouragement he has received. Max decides to teach his sister a lesson and secure a happy ending for Daniele. To that end, he orders his soldiers to turn Betly's house upside down. The soldiers eagerly obey and demand food and alcohol from Betly. Max conceals his identity from the sister, and frightens her into believing that if after fifteen days he and his troop depart satisfied, she will have to house the entire regiment.

Betly begs Daniele to stay with her for a day, in order to keep the unruly soldiers at bay. Overjoyed Daniele agrees, while Betly starts to feel sympathy for him. Max pretends to be drunk and makes false advances on Betly, who calls upon Daniele's help. After an argument Max challenges Daniele to a duel at midnight, which the latter accepts. For Max the duel is just a vehicle to bring Daniele and Betly together. To calm down anxious Betly, Daniele tells her that the sergeant has apologized, then swears eternal love to her and says he is leaving to join the army. At this moment Max reappears and pretends he will fight with Daniele. Betly, by now feeling a genuine affection for Daniele, attempts to prevent the duel and to save Daniele from being killed. Max says he may well show clemency if he knew Daniele were married. Upon hearing this, Betly gathers her courage and claims Daniele is in fact her husband, and father of the family, for that matter. As a proof of her words, Max first forces Betly and Daniele to embrace each other, and next demands the marriage contract to be shown. Betly finds and signs the document, that was already signed by a deceived Daniele in preparation for his "wedding". She gives the contract to Max and secretly tells Daniele that this is a ruse: in order to be valid, the document must also be signed by her brother Max. Once Max has the papers in his hands, he quickly signs them and reveals his identity. Betly proclaims her love for Daniele and the story happily concludes.

== Structure ==
The information below refers to the two-act version of the opera as appearing in an older edition by Casa Ricordi current in the 20th century. Further stages of Donizetti's reworking of the opera are reflected in a newer critical edition by the same publisher. Given Donizetti's readiness to adapt to external conditions and a particular choice of singers by adding, subtracting or modifying musical numbers, it is impossible to talk of a definitive version of Betly beyond a general classification into the one-act and two-act versions.

=== Act 1 ===
- Overture
- Daniele and Chorus: Introduction "Gia l'aurora in cielo appar" and cavatina "E fia ver?"
- Daniele: Recitative "Amici miei"
- Betly: Cavatina "In questo semplice, modesto asilo"
- Betly and Daniele: Recitative "Ho mangiato e bene" and duet "Ah! Io sognai che me beato"
- Daniele: Recitative "È finita per me"
- Max and chorus: Choir "Maledetta la vita di stento", recitative "Alto facciam, compagni" and cavatina "Ti vedo, ti bacio, terreno natio"
- Max: Recitative "Al riposo, compagni"
- Max and Daniele: Recitative "Oh, giovinotto, dimmi"
- Betly, Max, Chorus: Scene, choir and finale 1 "Per questa via remota"

=== Act 2 ===
- Chorus: Introduction "Che si tarda?"
- Betly, Max and Chorus: Recitative "Lasciatemi... che volete da me?" and brindisi "I destini del soldato"
- Betly and Daniele: Recitative "Tutto il giorno" and duet "Dolce instante inaspettato"
- Betly, Daniele and Max: Recitative "Che! L'ha fatto restar" and terzet "Davvero la scelta è buona"
- Daniele and Max: Recitative "Bassa la voce" and duet "O la bella immantinente"
- Betly, Max, Daniele and Chorus: Recitative "Mi reggo appena in piè" and aria finale "Se crudele il cor mostrai"

== Analysis ==
Donizetti's work on Betly fell during difficult years in his life, marked by the loss of his parents, daughter, and wife, and troubles due to the opera mismanagement in Naples. Nevertheless, the opera attests to the composer's creative powers.

With its rustic setting, a baritone soldier, and an independent and beautiful soprano, initially resisting courtship by a good-natured tenor, the plot of Betly bears an obvious resemblance to Donizetti's earlier work, L'elisir d'amore. Characters in the opera are depicted with mastery and vivacity, the music is tuneful, and the orchestration refined. The universal confusion at the end of act 1, with Betly confronting Max and his soldiers, resembles the one typical of Rossini's operas. The "Swiss" character of the work is highlighted by employing a yodel-type figure in Betly's cavatina "In questo semplice, modesto asilo". The latter aria was appreciated by musical critics of the 19th century for its charm and freshness, and was a popular choice as a concert piece. Betly also features an amusing instance of a musical joke: sleepy Daniele contributes notated yawns to Betly's concluding cadenza in their duet "Dolce instante inaspettato". Furthermore, the duet of Daniele and Max "Ah! Mi sprona la gloria" presents a subtle parody of "heroic" duets of tenors and baritones, of which Donizetti himself wrote several.

The principal differences between the one-act and two-act versions of the opera are the addition of an overture, replacement of spoken dialogues with recitatives set to music, addition and expansion of musical numbers, and transposition of the soprano role down a semitone.

== Recordings ==
Betly's cavatina "In questo semplice, modesto asilo" has been recorded by three leading bel canto repertory exponents of the 20th century, Dame Joan Sutherland, Montserrat Caballé and Margherita Carosio.

There are two full-length recordings of the opera:

Year	Cast: Betly, Daniele, Max	Conductor, opera house and orchestra	Label
1949	Angelica Tuccari, Giuseppe Gentile, Nestore Catalani	Giuseppe Morelli, Orchestra e Coro della Società del Quartetto di Roma	LP record: Period Records, Cat: SPL 585
1990	Susanna Rigacci, Maurizio Comencini, Roberto Scaltriti	Bruno Rigacci, Orchestra Sinfonica dell'Emilia Romagna "Arturo Toscanini" and Chorus of Teatro Rossini di Lugo	CD: Bongiovanni, Cat: GB 2091/92-2
