= Antonio Nani =

Maltese composer and conductor (1842–1929)

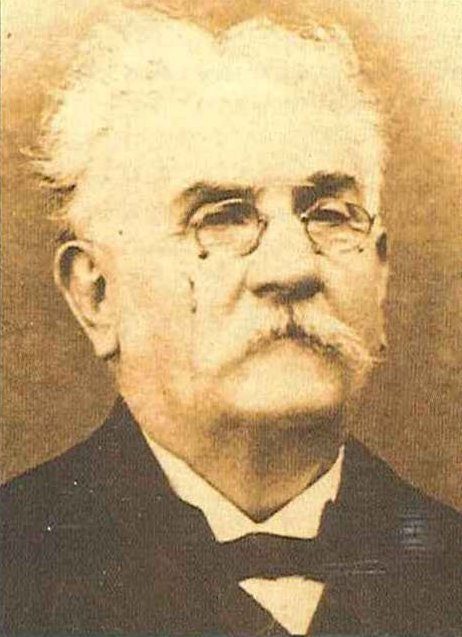
- Born: 6 October 1842; Valletta, Malta
- Died: 25 February 1929 (aged 86); Valletta, Malta
- Occupation: composer

Antonio (or Anton) Nani (6 October 1842 – 25 February 1929) was a Maltese composer and a member of a prominent family of Maltese musicians and composers. He composed both sacred music and operas.

== Family background ==
The Nani family's relationship with the musical life of Malta began with the violinist Angelo Nani (1751–1844), who was born in the Republic of Venice. While touring Malta as a concert violinist in 1766, he was appointed a chamber musician to the court of Manuel Pinto de Fonseca, the Prince and Grand Master of the Sovereign Military Order of Malta. Angelo married a Maltese woman and remained in Malta for the rest of his life, later becoming the impresario of the Manoel Theatre in Valletta. Three of his sons, Emmanuele (1769–1860), Vincenzo (1775–c.1840), and Agostino (1782–1846) all became violinists and composers, the most prominent of whom was Emmanuele. Another son, Giuseppe, the 11th of Angelo's thirteen children, became a lawyer. However, Giuseppe's son Paolo (1814–1904) became a composer like his uncles.

== Life and career ==
Antonio Nani was born in Valletta, the son of Paolo and Caterina (née Recau) Nani. He initially studied music in Malta with his father (a prolific composer of church music), Giuseppe Burlon, and Giuseppe Spiteri Fremond. Like his father, Antonio went to Naples for further training at the Conservatory of San Pietro a Majella. He remained in Naples from 1867 to 1879. He studied composition with Aniello Barbati and Nicola De Giosa and composed most of his mature works there, including his first opera, Zorilla, which premiered in 1872.

On his return to Malta, Nani became a maestro in his father's private cappella, which provided music for Maltese churches which did not have their own musicians or music directors. Although a less prolific composer than his father, Nani composed two works which are among the masterpieces of Maltese church music: his Requiem Mass, which he composed as a memorial to his mother and was awarded a gold medal at the 1886 Colonial and Indian Exhibition, and his Messa del Naufrago, composed in 1871 and subsequently revised in 1882 and 1908.

== Operas ==
- Zorilla (melodramma giocoso in 3 acts); libretto by Almerindo Spadetta; premiered Teatro Rossini, Naples, 22 February 1872
- I cavalieri di Malta (dramma lirico in a prologue and 3 acts); libretto by Enrico Golisciani; composed 1877, premiered Royal Opera House, Valletta, 16 January 1880
- Agnese Visconti (melodramma in 4 acts); libretto by Enrico Golisciani; composed 1876, premiered Royal Opera House, Valletta, 13 January 1889
