= Vespoli (surname) =

Vespoli is a surname. Notable people with the surname include:

- Luigi Vespoli (1834–1861), Italian composer
- Mike Vespoli (born 1946), American rower and coach

== As a stage name ==
- Dana Vespoli (born 1972), American pornographic actress and film director
