= Nicola d'Arienzo =

Italian composer (1842–1915)

Nicola D'Arienzo
- Born: 24 December 1842; Naples, Italy
- Died: 25 April 1915 (aged 72); Naples, Italy
- Occupations: composer; music pedagogue

Nicola d'Arienzo (24 December 1842 – 25 April 1915) was an Italian composer, music pedagogue, and writer on music. He spent his entire career in his native Naples where all but one of his nine of his operas were premiered. His other compositions included instrumental music, sacred music and art songs. From 1909 until 1911, d'Arienzo served as the director of the Conservatory of San Pietro a Majella having taught there since 1875. He also wrote several books on the history and theory of music.

== Life and career ==
Nicola d'Arienzo was born in Naples, the son of Maddalena (née Santelia) and Gaetano d'Arienzo. His father, a notary, was strongly opposed to him pursuing a career in music, and he initially studied piano secretly with Pietro Labriola and Michelangelo Russo. His uncle Marco d'Arienzo, a lawyer by profession and a prolific librettist by avocation, paid for the lessons and helped the young Nicola to overcome his father's opposition. He went on to study harmony and counterpoint with Vincenzo Fioravanti and orchestration with Giovanni Moretti, both of whom were opera composers.

D'Arienzo made his debut as a composer at the age of 17 with the premiere of Monzù Gnazio o La fidanzata del parrucchiere at the Tearo Nuovo. A comic opera with a libretto in Neapolitan dialect, Monzù Gnazio made a strong impression on Mercadante who took d'Arienzo under his wing, offering both advice and encouragement. Eight more operas followed between 1866 and 1887, all but one in the opera buffa or semiseria genres, and most of them with libretti written in Neapolitan dialect. Of these, his greatest critical success was Il cuoco e il segretario (The Cook and the Secretary) which premiered at the Teatro Rossini in Naples in January 1873. The critic from Gazzetta musicale di Milano praised the opera for its "good taste, dramatic force, original melodies, and brilliant orchestration". After 1880, d'Arienzo devoted his compositional activity primarily to instrumental and sacred music but composed one final opera, La fiera, which premiered at the Teatro Nuovo 1887 to great success. The libretto was by Salvatore Di Giacomo who was at the very beginning of his theatrical career.

From 1872, d'Arienzo had a parallel career as a music pedagogue and writer. He was appointed to the chair of harmony and counterpoint at the music school of the Real Albergo dei Poveri in 1872 and two years later became the school's director. In 1875, he moved to the Conservatory of San Pietro a Majella where his pupils included Niccolò van Westerhout, Leoncavallo and Luigi Denza. He initially taught harmony, counterpoint, and composition and from 1904 music history. On the death of Giuseppe Martucci in 1909, d'Arienzo was appointed director of the conservatory and served in that position until his retirement in 1912. In 1878 he wrote a book on music theory, Introduzione del sistema tetracordale nella musica moderna. In it he formulated a tetrachordal harmonic system based on the ancient Greek Phrygian mode which he linked historically to Neapolitan folk music. According to d'Arienzo, his opera La figlia del diavolo was attempt to put his new harmonic system into practice. The opera premiered in 1879 and proved to be somewhat controversial. It was well received by the public but was negatively reviewed by the critics for its "verismo tendencies". His later writings included several books and monographs on the history and aesthetics of Neapolitan music.

After his retirement from the conservatory, d'Arienzo continued to teach privately even after ill health had made him housebound. He died at his home in Naples on 25 April 1915 at the age of 72. In 1921, his widow, Carolina De Monte d'Arienzo, donated the entire collection of his manuscripts, scores, and an oil portrait of him by Vincenzo La Bella to the library of the San Pietro a Majella conservatory.

== Operas ==
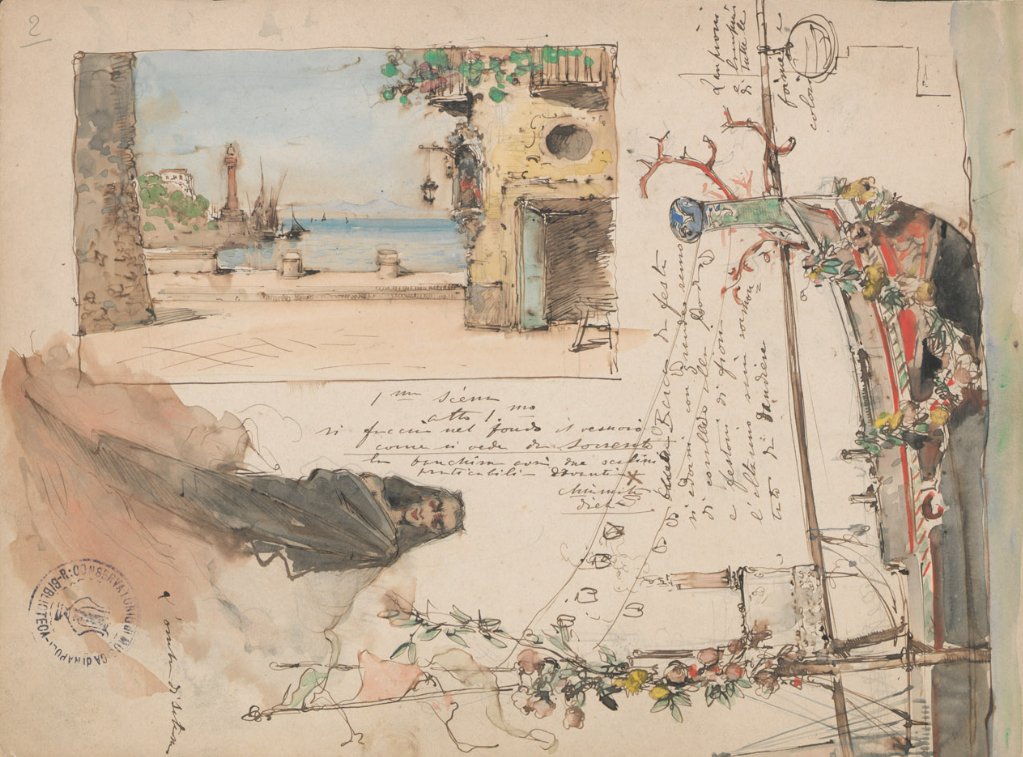
Eduardo Dalbono's set designs for La figlia del diavolo, 1879

- Monzù Gnazio o La fidanzata del parrucchiere (dramma giocoso in 2 acts); libretto by Andrea Passaro; premiered Teatro Nuovo, Naples, 1860
- I due mariti (commedia lirica in 3 acts); libretto by Almerindo Spadetta; premiered Teatro Bellini, Naples, 1 February 1866
- Le rose (commedia lirica in 3 acts); libretto by Almerindo Spadetta; premiered Teatro Bellini, Naples, February 1868
- Il cacciatore delle Alpi (azione semiseria in 1 act); libretto by Almerindo Spadetta; premiered Teatrino del Collegio dei Nobili, Naples, 23 June 1870
- Il cuoco e il segretario (opera buffa in 3 acts); libretto by Almerindo Spadetta after Eugène Scribe; premiered Teatro Rossini, Naples, 11 January 1873
- I viaggi (commedia lirica in 3 acts); libretto by Almerindo Spadetta; premiered Teatro Castelli, Milan, 23 June 1875.
- La figlia del diavolo (leggenda marinaresca in 3 acts); libretto by Alberto Landi; premiered Teatro Bellini, Naples, 16 November 1879
- I tre coscritti (melodramma in 2 acts); libretto by Leone Emmanuele Bardare; premiered Reale Albergo dei Poveri, Naples, 10 February 1880
- La fiera (commedia lirica in 3 acts); libretto by Salvatore Di Giacomo; premiered Teatro Nuovo, Naples, February 1887
