= Antonio Orefice =

Italian composer

Antonio Orefice (Note: In contemporary sources his surname was sometimes spelled as "Arefece" or "Orefici", and his first name sometimes given as "Antonicco".) (floruit 1708–1734) was an Italian opera composer active in Naples. His Patrò Calienno de la Costa was the first opera buffa in Neapolitan dialect to be performed on a public stage.

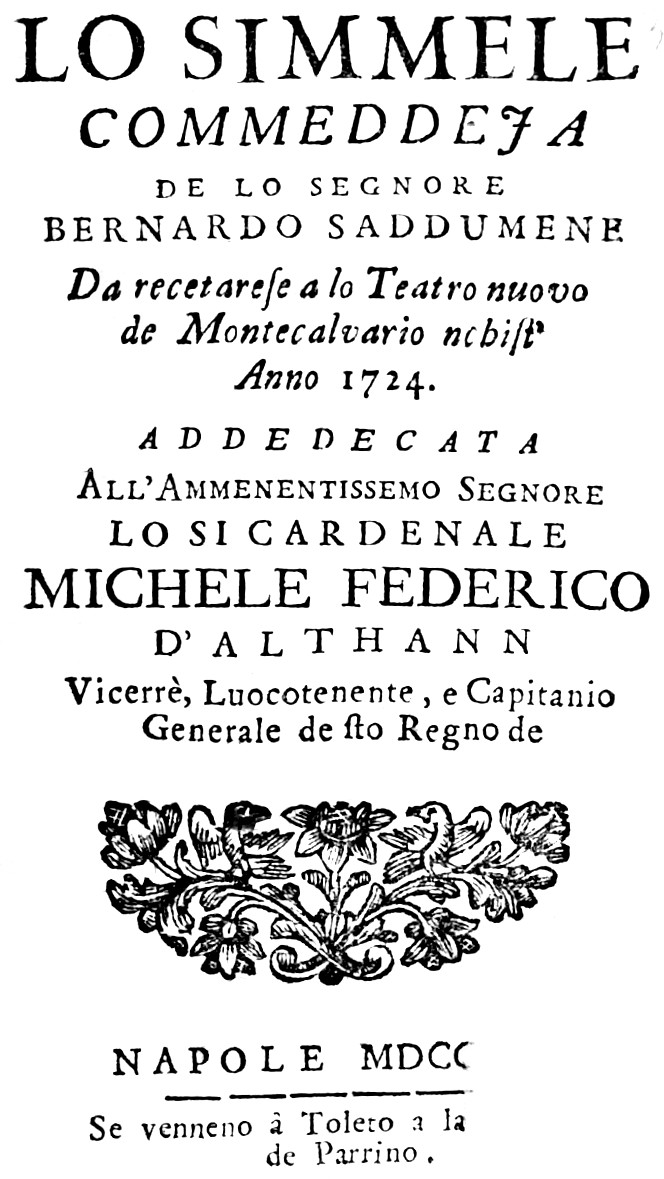
Libretto printed the premiere of Orefice's Lo Simmele which inaugurated the Teatro Nuovo in October 1724

== Life and career ==
Virtually nothing is known about Orefice's life. He was probably born around 1685, and some early sources have stated that he originally trained to be a lawyer. Records of his activity begin in Naples in 1708 with the production of his Il Maurizio, an opera seria which premiered in December of that year at the Teatro San Bartolomeo. He wrote several operas in this genre, including L'Engelberta co-composed with Francesco Mancini (1709), La pastorella al soglio (1710), and La Caligula delirante (1713), all of which premiered at the San Bartolomeo.

However, Orefice's fame primarily rests with his pioneering work in the Neapolitan opera buffa genre. Prior to the premiere of his Patrò Calienno de la Costa in 1709 at the Teatro dei Fiorentini, works of this type had only been performed in the private theatres of aristocrats. Its success, documented in the Gazzetta di Napoli, led to the Teatro dei Fiorentini commissioning and premiering many more such works by Orefice and others. Their popularity also led to the opening of two new theatres in Naples to accommodate the expanding audiences for these works—the Teatro della Pace and the Teatro Nuovo. The premiere of Orefice's Lo Simmele set to a libretto in Neapolitan dialect by Bernardo Saddumene inaugurated the newly built Teatro Nuovo on 15 October 1724. Five years later, Lo Simmele and Leonardo Vinci's Li zite ngalera became the first works of this genre to be presented outside Naples. Partially translated into the Tuscan dialect with some alteration to the music by Giovanni Fischetti and given new titles, (Note: Orefice's Lo Simmele was performed as La somiglianza and Vinci's Li zite ngalera as La costanza.) they were performed at the Teatro Capranica in Rome and further increased the popularity of the genre.

Orefice's last three works were La vecchia trammera (1732) and La Rosilla (1733), both co-composed with Leonardo Leo; and La Finta pellegrina (1734), co-composed with Domenico Sarro. All three were opere buffe, and all three premiered at the Teatro Nuovo. There is no further mention of Orefice after 1734, and he is presumed to have died shortly thereafter. Despite the popularity of his works during his lifetime, virtually all of his scores have been lost. His largest extant score is the first half of Engelberta. Also surviving are seven of the arias which he wrote for his Le fente zingare (1717). The seven arias constitute the earliest surviving scores for Neapolitan opera buffa. They were transcribed and published in 1965 by the Italian musicologist Giuseppe Pastore. (Note: For the transcriptions of the arias from Le fente zingare, see Pastore, Giuseppe A. (December 1965) "Le «arielle co' violine» di Antonicco Arefece". Studi Salentini, pp. 249-262.)
