= Le chalet =

Opéra comique in one act by Adolphe Adam

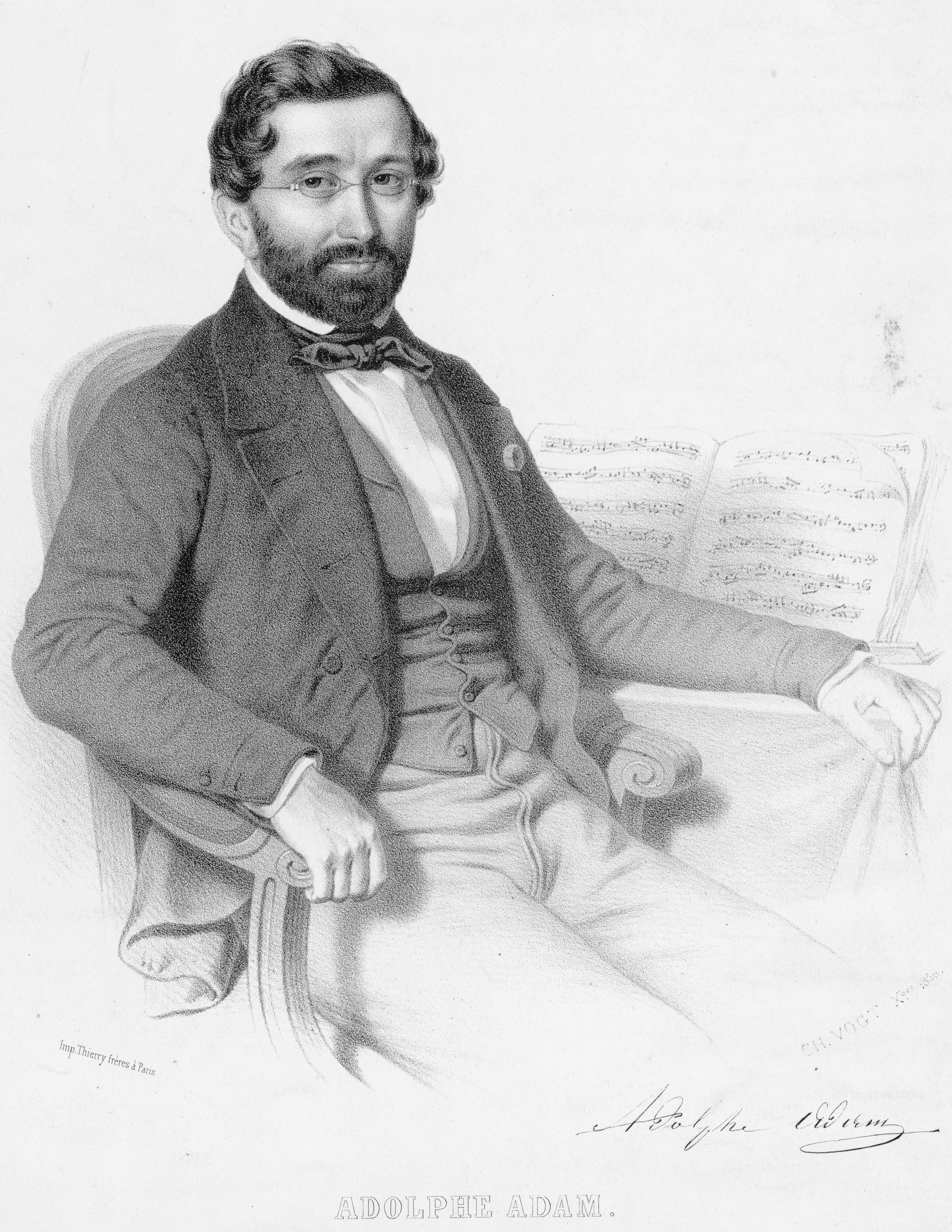
Adolphe Adam, Lithograph, 1850

Le chalet (French pronunciation: [lə ʃalɛ]) is an opéra comique in one act by Adolphe Adam to a French libretto by Eugène Scribe and Mélesville after the singspiel Jery und Bätely by Goethe. The score re-uses material from Adam's Prix de Rome cantata Ariane a Naxos (1825). The text for the singspiel had previously been set to music by Peter Winter, 1790, Johann Friedrich Reichardt, 1801, and Conradin Kreutzer, 1810, and was done later by Donizetti, 1836, Julius Rietz, 1841, Heinrich Stihl, 1867, and Ingeborg Bronsart, 1873.

== Performance history ==
The opera was premiered on 25 September 1834 by the Paris Opéra-Comique at the Salle de la Bourse. The work had a long and successful career at the Opéra-Comique; it reached its 500th performance in 1851, its 1,000th in 1873 and 1,500th in 1922 with Miguel Villabella as Daniel, reaching 1,547 by 1950.

In a rare revival and "a double-bill of the same opera by different composers", Le Chalet was performed before Betly by Donizetti on the same evening at the Stadttheater Solothurn in October 2023 during the 2023–24 season.

== Roles ==
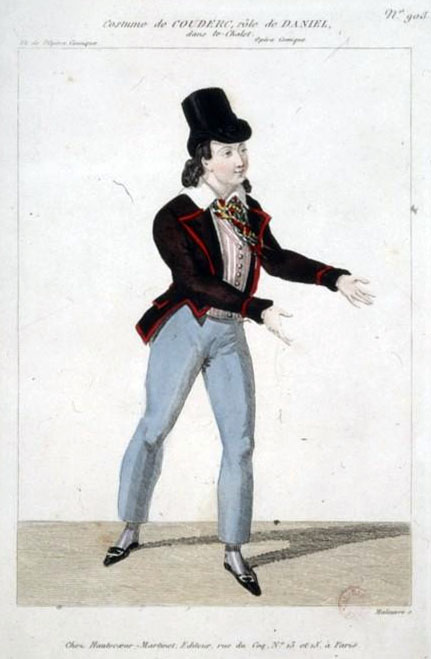
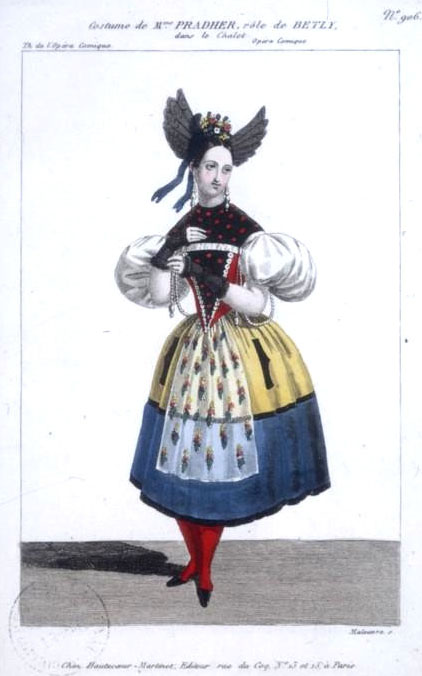
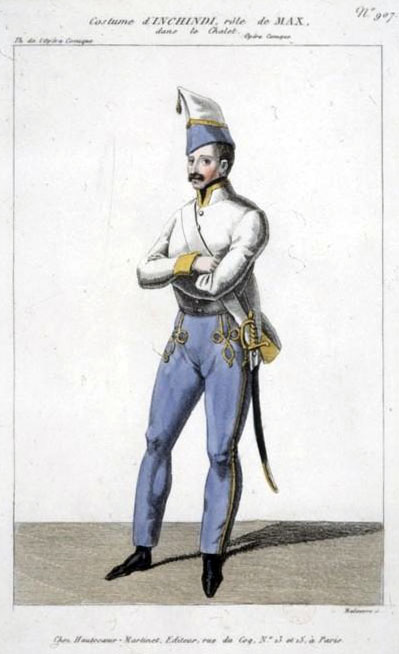
Costume designs for Daniel, Bettly, and Max in the original production

Role	Voice type	Premiere cast, 25 September 1834 (Conductor: Henri Valentino)
Daniel, a young farmer	tenor	Joseph-Antoine-Charles Couderc
Bettly, Max's sister	soprano	Félicité Pradher, née More
Max, in the Swiss army	bass-baritone	Inchindi (Jean-François Hennekindt)
Chorus: Soldiers, young men and women of the valley

== Synopsis ==
The scene is the inside of a chalet, open at the rear with a view of the countryside, and in the distance the mountains of Appenzell in Switzerland.

After a chorus of young villagers, a young farmer, Daniel, "the handsomest young man of Appenzell" enters and sings of his love for Bettly. The villagers sing of his misguided love, but in his joy he invites all to a wedding supper that evening.

Daniel reads a letter from Bettly which she has written to him, returning his love; Bettly enters and tells of her brother Max who has been absent fighting for fifteen years. It soon becomes clear that Bettly did not write the letter to Daniel (she cannot write) and she mocks him for being taken in by a joke of her friends.

Daniel is furious, having made all the preparations for a marriage including a contract, but Bettly flatly refuses, saying she doesn't need a husband. In his letter to Bettly, Max urges her to marry – and Daniel confesses that he has asked Max to intervene on his behalf.

Daniel hears troops approaching and asks them into the chalet; Max sings of his happiness of being back in his valley "Vallons de l'Helvétie". Daniel tells Max (whom he doesn't recognise) of his woes and asks to enlist in the army.

Bettly enters and Max and his men demand food and wine. Max conceals his identity from his sister, and leads her to believe that she will be at the mercy of the whole regiment for two weeks. Daniel re-enters with an old sword, ready to become a soldier, and from all his papers gives Bettly his will to keep; in a duo she asks him to stay while the soldiers are at the chalet; he agrees and curls up to sleep in a chair.

Max comes in pretending to be a bit drunk and Bettly cries for help. Daniel wakes and after an argument Max challenges him to a duel. As Daniel insists to her that he is prepared for his army life, Bettly, impressed by Daniel's willingness to fight for her honour, tries to prevent the duel, goes to his bags and finds the marriage certificate which she quickly signs. She whispers to Daniel that this is just a ruse; without her brother's signature it will not be legal, but Max has crept up and signed the contract, saying that he has tricked them both to force them to be happy together.

== List of numbers ==
This list of musical numbers is based on the Tallandier piano-vocal score. An earlier piano-vocal score published by Schonenberger omits No. 1 and the spoken dialogue and combines Nos. 4 and 5 as No. 3. A conductor's orchestral score is held at the Bibliothèque-Musée de l'Opéra National de Paris (shelf mark F. 2736).

Overture

1. Introduction et Chorus (sopranos 1 & 2, tenors, basses) "Déjà dans la plaine"
2. Air (Daniel) "Elle est à moi! C'est ma compagne"
3. Couplets (Bettly) "Dans ce modeste et simple asile"
4. Air (Max) "Arrêtons-nous ici!"
5. Ensemble (Max, Bettly, tenors 1 & 2, basses) "Par cet étroit sentier"
6. Couplets with chorus (Max, tenors 1 & 2, basses, a soldier) "Dans le service de l'Autriche"
  (cont.) Ensemble (Bettly, Max, tenors 1 & 2, basses) "Malgré moi je frissonne"
7. Duo (Bettly, Daniel) "Prêt à quitter ceux que l'on aime"
8. Duo (Max, Daniel) "Il faut me céder ta maîtresse"
9. Romance (Daniel, Bettly) "Adieu, vous que j'ai tant chérie"
10. Trio et Finale (Daniel, Max, Bettly, chorus) "Soutiens mon bras"

== Recordings ==
- Pierre Gianotti (Daniel), Julien Giovanetti (Max), Nadine Sautereau (Bettly), Pierre Roi (a soldier), ORTF Lyric Ensemble, Jules Gressier (conductor), broadcast performance from 1954. Released on LP by Unique Opera Records Corporation UORC 314, November – December, 1976; spoken dialogue is omitted. Also: Malibran CD 694 (includes additional excerpts with Armand Narçon, Edmond Tirmont and Étienne Billot), and Hamburg: Line Music, 2 CDs, 2008.
- Joseph Peyron (Daniel), Stanislas Staskiewicz (Max), Denise Boursin (Bettly), ORTF Lyric Orchestra, Albert Wolff (conductor). Recorded 20 November 1965; 33 minutes 18 seconds; musical excerpts without chorus and dialogue. Also includes music from Adam's Le farfadet with Janine Capderou, Lina Dachary, Joseph Peyron, Bernard Plantey, Bernard Demigny, and the ORTF Chamber Orchestra conducted by Robert Benedetti. Recorded 4 September 1970; 37 minutes 35 seconds. Musidisc [201942]. Also on Gaieté lyrique CD, 1992, Michel Parouty (liner notes), OCLC 29940067.
- In 2017, a complete recording was issued by Timpani, with Jodie Devos (Brettly), Sébastien Droy (Daniel), Ugo Rabec (Max), and the chorus and orchestra of the Opéra de Toulon under Guillaume Tourniaire.

== Sources ==
- Adam, Adolphe (n.d. [18..]?). Le chalet. Opéra comique en 1 acte. Paroles de Mrs. E. Scribe et Mélesville, musique de Ad. Adam (piano-vocal score, 139 pages). Paris: Schonenberger. OCLC 493629284.
- Adam, Adolphe; Tallandier, Jules, editor (1890). Le chalet. Opéra comique en un acte. Musique de Adolphe Adam. Partition complète – piano et chant. (piano-vocal score; XVI, 244 pages). Paris: Tallandier. OCLC 608605451, 630823887.
- Buhler, François (juin 2003). "Une pièce bien faite: le Chalet de Scribe et Adam", RMSR.
- Buhler, François (5 mai 2003), "Le Chalet d'Adolphe Adam: quand la Suisse était un sujet exotique pour opéra-comique", RMS.
- Chouquet, Gustave (1889). "Valentino, Henri Justin Armand Joseph", vol. 4, p. 214, in A Dictionary of Music and Musicians, 4 volumes. London: Macmillan.
- Forbes, Elizabeth (1992). "Chalet, Le" in Sadie 1992, vol. 1, p. 816.
- Jowers, Sidney Jackson; Cavanagh, John (2000). Theatrical Costume, Masks, Make-up and Wigs: A Bibliography and Iconography. London: Routledge. ISBN 978-0-415-24774-0.
- Pougin, Arthur (1880). "Valentino (Henri-Justin-Joseph)", pp. 597–598, in Biographie universelle des musiciens et Bibliographie générale de la musique par F.-J. Fétis. Supplément et complément, vol. 2. Paris: Firmin-Didot. View at Google Books.
- Sadie, Stanley, editor (1992). The New Grove Dictionary of Opera (4 volumes). London: Macmillan. ISBN 978-1-56159-228-9.
- Wild, Nicole; Charlton, David (2005). Théâtre de l'Opéra-Comique Paris: répertoire 1762-1972. Sprimont, Belgium: Editions Mardaga. ISBN 978-2-87009-898-1.
- Wolff, Stéphane (1953). Un demi-siècle d'Opéra-Comique (1900-1950). Paris: André Bonne. OCLC 44733987, 2174128, 78755097
