= Nicola De Giosa =

Italian composer & conductor (1819–1885)

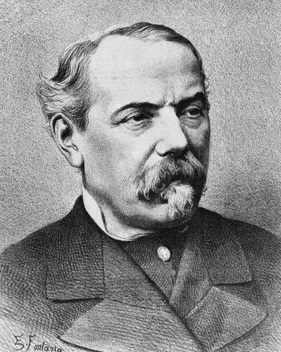
- Born: 3 May 1819; Bari, Kingdom of the Two Sicilies
- Died: 7 July 1885 (aged 66); Bari, Italy
- Occupations: composer; conductor

Nicola De Giosa (3 May 1819 – 7 July 1885) was an Italian composer and conductor active in Naples. He composed numerous operas, the most successful of which, Don Checco and Napoli di carnevale, were in the Neapolitan opera buffa genre. His other works included sacred music and art songs. His songs were particularly popular, bringing him fame as a salon composer both in Italy and abroad. De Giosa died in Bari, the city of his birth, at the age of 66.

== Life and career ==
De Giosa was born in Bari to Angelantonio and Lucia (née Favia) De Giosa. He initially trained to be a flautist, first in Bari with his elder brother Giuseppe and then with Errico Daniele. Daniele recognized his talent and persuaded De Giosa's father to enroll him at the Conservatory of San Pietro a Majella in Naples. He passed the entrance examination at age 14 with sufficient merit to be awarded free tuition at the conservatory and continued his flute studies there with Pasquale Bongiorno. He also studied composition with Francesco Ruggi, Niccolò Zingarelli, and later with Gaetano Donizetti. According to contemporary accounts, he was one of Donizetti's favourite pupils. In 1839, while still a student, two of his compositions for soloists, chorus and orchestra were performed at the conservatory in honour of Count Wenzel Robert von Gallenberg who had died in March of that year. However, in 1841 he left San Pietro a Majella without completing his studies following a series of disputes with the Saverio Mercadante who succeeded Zingarelli as the conservatory's director in 1840. (Note: Mercadante's chief rival for the position of director was Donizetti who had served as the conservatory's interim director following Zingarelli's death in 1837.)

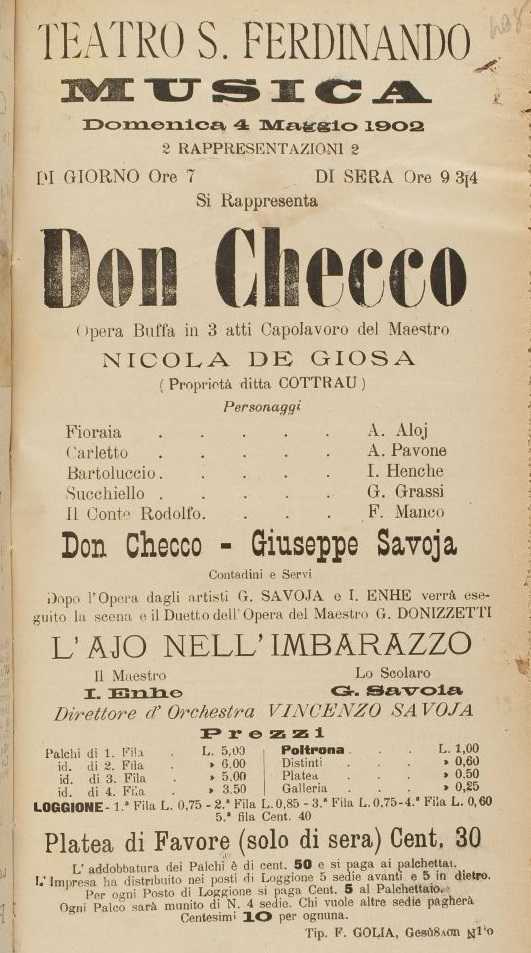
Poster for a performance of De Giosa's masterpiece Don Checco at the Teatro San Ferdinando in 1902

In 1842 De Giosa made his debut as an opera composer with the premiere of his opera buffa, La casa di tre artisti, at the Teatro Nuovo. It was well received in Naples and replicated in Turin, Genoa and Milan in 1846 under the title L'arrivo del signor zio. While it was a success with the audiences of Genoa and Turin, the Milan reception suffered from a poor production and arguments between supporters of the old Neapolitan school exemplified by De Giosa and those of the new style exemplified by Verdi whose Due Foscari was also playing in city. He produced 14 more operas between 1845 and 1882, most of which were in the opera buffa and opera semiseria genres and premiered in Naples. He also composed in the opera seria genre, but they were not nearly as successful and considered "pale imitations" of Donizetti. De Giosa's masterpiece and one of the last great successes in the history of Neapolitan opera buffa was Don Checco. It had a run of 98 consecutive performances at the Teatro Nuovo where it premiered in 1850 and was regularly produced in numerous opera houses in Italy and abroad over the next 40 years. It was produced in Naples as late as 1902 and was revived in 2014 in a co-production by the Teatro San Carlo and the Festival della Valle d'Itria.

In middle age, De Giosa began an active conducting career. According to musicologist Andrea Lanza, as a conductor he was "particularly admired for the scrupulousness of his orchestral balance and ensemble." He was Chief Conductor at the Teatro San Carlo in Naples for several seasons between 1860 and 1876, conducting amongst other performances, the premiere of Mercadante's Virginia in 1866 and the posthumous premiere of Donizetti's Gabriella di Vergy in 1869. His other conducting posts included the 1867–68 season at La Fenice in Venice, the 1870–71 season at the Khedivial Opera House in Cairo, (Note: De Giosa had hoped to conduct the premiere of Verdi's Aida at the Khedivial Opera House in December 1871 and took personal affront when Verdi insisted on sending his own conductor. Verdi wrote in reply to De Giosa in January 1871 "it seems to me that no one can take offense, if the author, when one of his productions is given for the first time, sends a person who has carefully studied the work under the direction of the author himself".) and the 1873 season at the Teatro Colón in Buenos Aires. De Giosa's biographer, Alfredo Giovine, wrote that during this period he suffered two painful setbacks. He lost most of his savings when several Neapolitan banks failed, and later many of his manuscript scores disappeared while he was on one of his absences from Naples. He returned home to find that his maid had sold the scores for a pittance to the proprietor of a local delicatessen who used them for wrapping food. According to Giovine, De Giosa eventually replaced his lost savings with the money he earned from his successful conducting career.

Despite his concentration on conducting after 1860, De Giosa continued to compose operas, although several of them were revisions of earlier works. The most successful of these later works was Napoli di carnovale. The project was a protest against the "invasion" of Neapolitan opera stages by French operetta at the expense of the city's native musical culture. Set in a working-class neighbourhood of Naples at Carnival time, it recounts the ultimately successful campaign by Temostocle, nephew of the wealthy and pretentious Don Gasperone, to marry the daughter of a shoemaker. Napoli di carnovale premiered to great success at the Teatro Nuovo in 1876. It ran for 85 performances there and was subsequently performed in multiple Italian and foreign theatres over the next ten years. During this time De Giosa was also active as a teacher at the Conservatory of San Pietro a Majella and in organizations dedicated to the encouragement of young musicians and composers.

De Giosa spent his last years in Bari under the care of his doctors and relatives. By June 1884 he was reported to be suffering from insanity and severe physical debilitation. He no longer recognized the friends who came to visit him and frequently invoked his old teacher, murmuring "Donizetti!... student of Donizetti... I die looking up to the sky!". (Note: Original Italian: "Donizetti!... scolaro di Donizetti... muoio additando il cielo!") He died in July 1885 at the age of 66 and was buried in the city's Cimitero Chiesa Madre. The street Via Nicola de Giosa which ends at the Teatro Petruzzelli was named in his honour. He is also commemorated with a large statue which stands in the foyer of the Petruzzelli. It had survived the fire which virtually destroyed the original building in 1991.

== Works ==
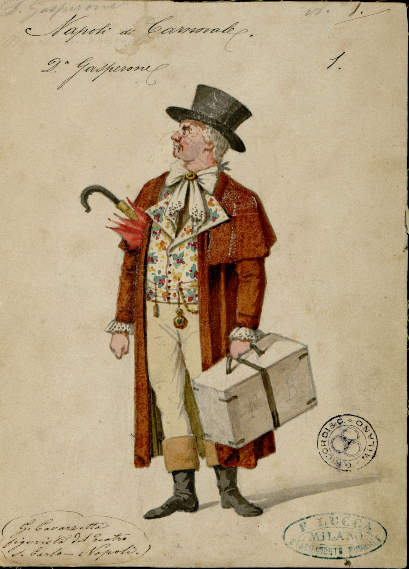
Costume design for Don Gasperone from the premiere production of Napoli di carnovale

=== Operas ===
- La casa di tre artisti (opera buffa in 3 acts); libretto by Andrea Passaro; premiered Teatro Nuovo, Naples, 1842
- Elvina (opera semiseria in 3 acts); libretto by Almerindo Spadetta; premiered Teatro Nuovo, Naples, 1845
- Ascanio il gioielliere (opera semiseria in 3 acts); libretto by Giuseppe Sesto Giannini; premiered Teatro d'Angennes, Turin, 1847
- Le due guide (melodramma in 4 acts); libretto by Marco D'Arienzo, premiered Teatro degli Armeni, Livorno, 1848
- Don Checco (opera buffa in 2 acts); libretto by Almerindo Spadetta; premiered Teatro Nuovo, Naples, 1850
- Folco d'Arles (melodramma tragico in 3 acts); libretto by Salvadore Cammarano after Victor Hugo; premiered Teatro San Carlo, Naples, 1851
- Guido Colmar (opera seria in 3 acts); libretto by Domenico Bolognese; premiered Teatro San Carlo, Naples, 1852 (Note: Performed in a revised version under the title Silvia, Teatro San Carlo, 1864.)
- Ettore Fieramosca (opera seria in 3 acts); libretto by Domenico Bolognese; premiered Teatro San Carlo, Naples, 1855
- Un geloso e la sua vedova (commedia lirica in 3 acts); libretto by Ernesto Del Preite, premiered Teatro Nuovo, Naples, 1857
- Isella la modista (dramma giocoso in 3 acts); libretto by Leopoldo Tarantini; premiered Teatro del Fondo, Naples, 1857
- Il bosco di Dafne (dramma cristiano in 3 acts); libretto by Michele Achille Bianchi; premiered Teatro San Carlo, Naples, 1864 (Note: Revised version of De Giosas's unperformed opera Elena composed in 1853.)
- Il pipistrello (operetta comica in 3 acts); libretto by Enrico Golisciani after Desforges; premiered Teatro della Società Filarmonica, Naples, 1875 (Note: Originally composed in 1847 as La chauve-souris to a libretto in French by Desforges. It was intended for the Opéra-Comique in Paris but was not performed.)
- Napoli di carnovale (opera buffa in 3 acts); libretto Marco D'Arienzo and Enrico Golisciani; premiered Teatro Nuovo, Naples, 1876
- Il conte di San Romano (dramma lirico in 4 acts); libretto by Enrico Golisciani; premiered Teatro Bellini, Naples, 1878
- Rabagas (opera comica in 4 acts); libretto by Enrico Golisciani after Victorien Sardou; premiered Teatro Argentina, Rome, 1882

=== Sacred music ===
Most of De Giosa's sacred music was composed during his time at the San Pietro a Majella conservatory including four masses, three of them messe di gloria, and a Dixit Dominus. He also composed a Stabat Mater, Salve Regina, and three sinfonie based on themes from his masses and the Dixit. In the early 1870s he composed a requiem mass in memory of Donizetti. The Donizetti requiem received its first 20th-century performance in 1997 at the Festival della Valle d'Itria.

=== Other vocal ===
De Giosa composed over 400 art songs and pieces of salon music. Many of these pieces were published in 26 collections of his work—10 in Milan and 16 in Naples. He also wrote several longer pieces of vocal music for specific occasions:

- Una lagrima sulla tomba del Conte Gallenberg (A Tear on the Tomb of Count Gallenberg), prayer for soloist, chorus, and orchestra (1839)
- Inno funebre, funeral hymn (also for Count Gallenberg) for four soloists, chorus and orchestra (1839)
- Cantata for the dedication of the marble bust of Ferdinand II in the Acquaviva delle Fonti Cathedral (1853)
