= Cleopatra (Rossi) =

1876 opera by Lauro Rossi

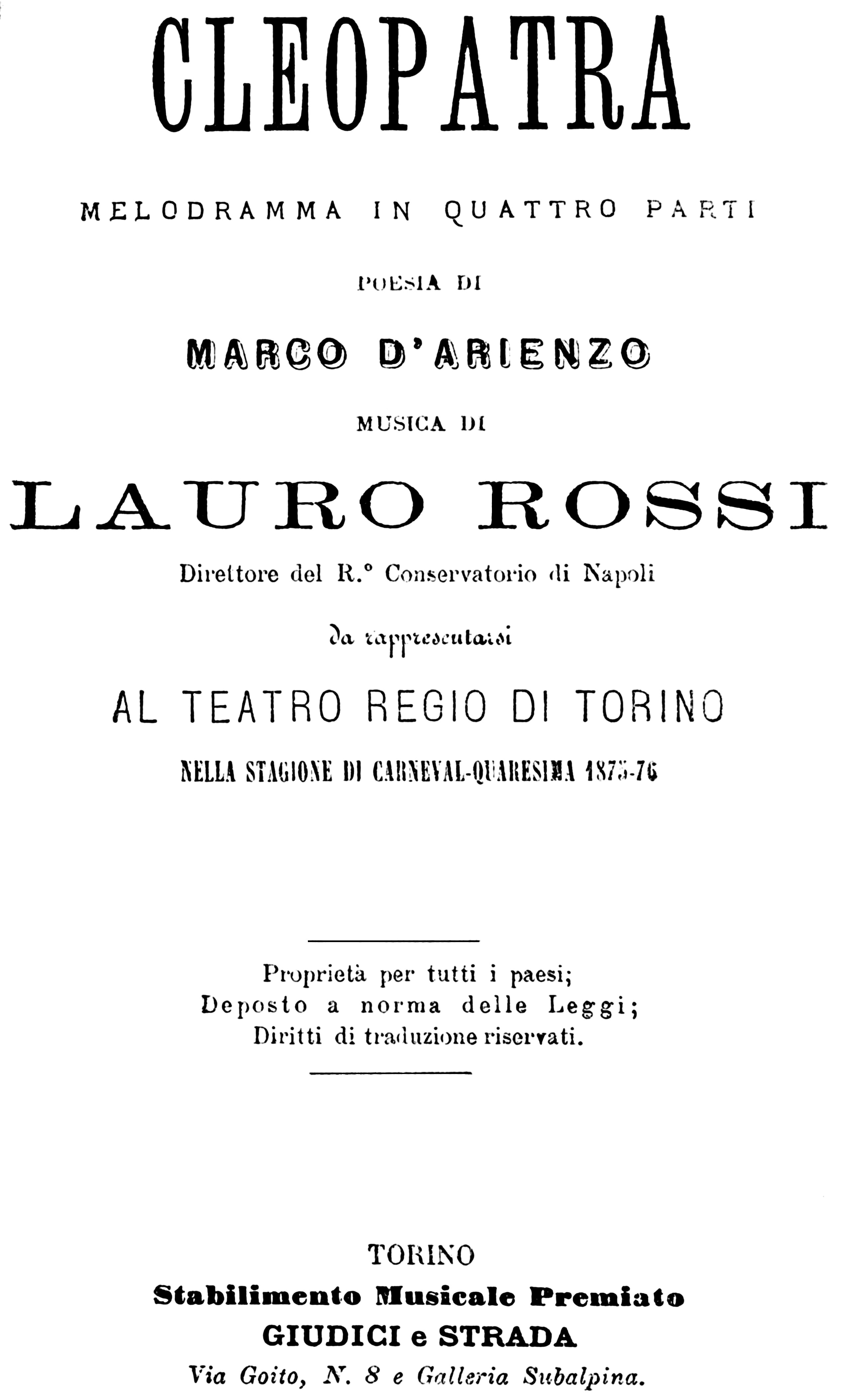
Libretto title page, Turin 1876

Cleopatra is an 1876 opera by Lauro Rossi to a libretto by Marco D'Arienzo based on Shakespeare's Antony and Cleopatra. The opera was first performed on 5 March 1876 at the Teatro Regio in Turin.

== Recording ==
- Cleopatra - Dimitra Theodossiou (Cleopatra), Alessandro Liberatore (Marco Antonio), Paolo Pecchioli (Ottavio Cesare), Sebastian Catana (Diomede), William Corrò (Proculejo), Tiziana Carraro (Ottavia), Paola Gardina (Carmiana); Orchestra Filarmonica Marchigiana & Coro Lirico Marchigiano 'V. Bellini', David Crescenzi. Naxos DVD or 2CD
