= Alfonso Buonomo =

Italian composer

- Born: 12 August 1829; Naples, Italy
- Died: 28 January 1903 (aged 73); Naples, Italy
- Occupation: composer

Alfonso Buonomo (12 August 1829 – 28 January 1903) was an Italian composer active in Naples where all nine of his operas premiered. He also composed sacred music and salon songs.

Buonomo was born in Naples and studied at the Conservatory of San Pietro a Majella. His initial training there was primarily in piano and voice, but he later decided to focus on composition which he studied with Giuseppe Lillo. He made his debut as an opera composer in 1857 with the premiere at the Teatro Nuovo of Cicco e Cola, an opera buffa in three acts with a libretto by Almerindo Spadetta.
