= Vincenzo Fioravanti =

Italian composer

- Born: 5 April 1799; Rome, Roman Republic (now Italy)
- Died: 28 March 1877 (aged 77); Naples, Italy
- Occupation: composer

Vincenzo Gioacchino Fioravanti (5 April 1799 – 28 March 1877) was a prolific Italian opera composer active in Naples. He composed 39 operas, of which 34 were performed in his lifetime. Like his father, Valentino Fioravanti, he specialised in the opera buffa genre, but he also composed sacred music including two oratorios during his time as maestro di cappella of Lanciano Cathedral (1839–1843).

== Life and career ==
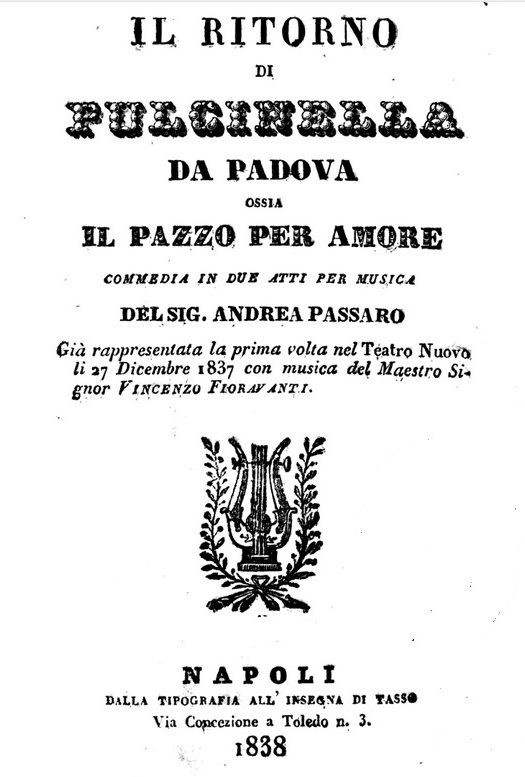
Libretto printed shortly after the premiere of Fioravanti's most enduring success, Il ritorno di Pulcinella dagli studi di Padova (Note: The title had several variations. For performances outside Naples the character "Pulcinella" was generally replaced with "Columella".)

Fioravanti was born in Rome to Angiola (née Aromatari) and Valentino Fioravanti. Despite his own success as a composer, Valentino wanted his son to study medicine. Valentino was living in Naples while Vincenzo was supposedly studying medicine in Rome. Unbeknownst to him, the young Vincenzo was secretly studying composition with his father's old teacher Giuseppe Jannacconi. In 1816 Vincenzo arrived in Naples and confessed to his father that he had been studying music. Valentino relented and gave his son further lessons in composition. He made his debut as composer at the Teatro San Carlino in Naples in 1819 with the premiere of La Pulcinella molinaro, spaventato dalla fata Serafinetta, an opera buffa set to a libretto by Filippo Cammarano.

The following year, he returned to Rome, sought advice from Donizetti, and completed his second opera, La contadina fortunata which had a successful premiere at the Teatro Valle in November 1820. While in Rome he married Maddalena Tedeschi whose father only consented to the marriage on the condition that Fioravanti renounce a theatrical career. Maddalena died ten months after their wedding. Fioravanti returned to Naples but did not return to the opera stage until 1828 when his Robinson Crusoè nell'isola deserta premiered at the Teatro Nuovo. Several more operas followed including his Il ritorno di Pulcinella dagli studi di Padova which proved to be his most enduring success. A comic opera whose hero is thrown into an asylum for insane musicians, it ran to 35 performances at the Teatro Nuovo where it had premiered in 1837 and was subsequently performed in various adaptations throughout Italy and abroad over the next 80 years.

After his father's death in 1837 Fioravanti moved to Lanciano. From 1839 to 1843 he served as the maestro di cappella of the Lanciano Cathedral and composed several pieces of sacred music including two oratorios, Seila (1840) and Il sacrificio di Jefte (1841). His career reached its zenith after his return to Naples in 1843 where he premiered 17 more operas and became one of King Ferdinand II's favourite composers. His last opera, Il signor Pepino premiered in 1856 after which his career went into decline. Disappointed in his hopes of receiving the chair in counterpoint at the Conservatory of San Pietro a Majella, Fioravanti's economic position became increasingly perilous. In 1864 a group of his friends produced the Album Fioravanti at their own cost to be sold for his benefit. Compiled by the pianist and composer Matteo Fischetti, it contained a biography of Fioravanti and facsimile reproductions of the autograph scores for three of his unpublished arias as well as pieces donated by Fischetti and Nicola De Giosa.

=== Last years ===
In 1866 Fioravanti was made the honorary director of the Real Albergo dei Poveri music school which came with free food and lodging. The following year, he was given the actual directorship and a small monthly salary was added. A serious illness in 1872 forced him to give up the position, although the music school continued to pay his salary and provide food and lodging for the rest of his life. In his final years he passed the time writing epigrammatic verses. Destitute and almost blind, he died in the Real Albergo shortly before his 78th birthday. A Requiem Mass which he had composed during his time at Lanciano was played at his funeral. Federico Polidoro, who visited Fioravanti in the last week of his life, wrote that he had remained lucid until the end and had said that the greatest joy of his last years was seeing his long-ago student Nicola D'Arienzo become the professor of counterpoint at San Pietro a Majella.
