= Pierre Jean Baptiste Choudard Desforges =

French actor, dramatist, librettist and man of letters

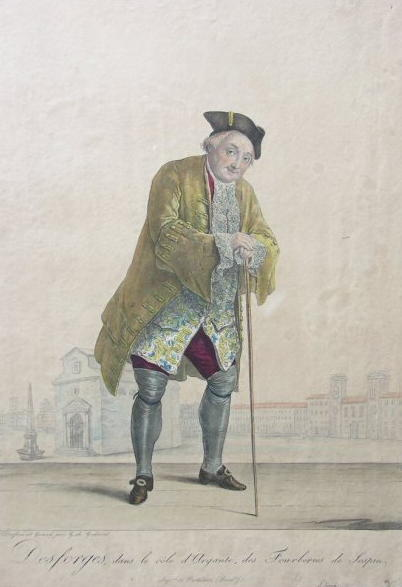
Desforges in the role of Argante in Les Fourberies de Scapin (engraving by Galard, ca. 1775)

Pierre-Jean-Baptiste Choudard, known under the pen name of Desforges, (15 September 1746 – 13 August 1806) was a French actor, dramatist, librettist and man of letters.

== Biography ==
Choudard was born in Paris, the natural son of Dr. Antoine Petit. He was educated at the Collège Mazarin and the Collège de Beauvais and, in accordance with his father's wishes, began the study of medicine. He then turned to painting and did casual work.

Dr. Petit's death left him dependent on his own resources, and after appearing on the stage of the Comédie-Italienne in Paris he joined a troupe of wandering actors, whom he served in the capacity of playwright. He was known under the pen name of Desforges, which also was the name he had on the stage. He married an actress; the two were welcomed in Saint Petersburg, where they spent three years (1779 to 1782). After his return to Paris he dedicated himself completely to literature.

Desforges was one of the first to avail himself of the new facilities afforded under the Revolution for divorce and remarriage. His memoirs are said to have been undertaken at the request of Madame Desforges.

He died in Paris in 1806.

== Works ==
=== Theater ===
==== Selected plays and librettos ====
- Tom Jones à Londres, 1782, after Henry Fielding's The History of Tom Jones, a Foundling; This play was on the repertoire of the Théâtre français during a long time.
- L’Épreuve villageoise, 1785, music by André Grétry, his first great success
- La Femme jalouse, 1785, after George Colman the Elder
- Le Sourd, ou l'Auberge pleine, 1790, on Gallica
- Joconde (or La Joconde), opéra-comique, music by Louis Jadin, 1790, after La Fontaine
- Alisbelle, ou les Crimes de la féodalité, opéra en 3 actes, en vers, 1794, music by Louis Jadin, on Gallica
- Les Époux divorcés, 1799, a comedy
- Coesarine et Victor, ou Les époux dès le berceau, comédie en trois actes et en vers libres, 1800, on Gallica

==== Complete list ====
- Plays and premieres, on cesar.

=== Novels ===
- His novels, first published in four 12mo volumes in 1798, were published again in the same format in five volumes in 1819.

=== Revolutionary writings ===
- Citizen Desforges' play Alisbelle, ou les Crimes de la féodalité was in tune with the ideas of the French Revolution. He also published revolutionary poems and a Plan of general education.

=== Memoirs ===
- Le poëte, ou Mémoires d'un homme de lettres écrits par lui-même, 4 vols (1798).

== Notes and references ==
- Gustave Vapereau. "Desforges (Pierre-Jean-Baptiste Choudard)", p. 616, in Dictionnaire universel des littératures, Paris: Hachette 1876, on Google books
- Encyclopædia Britannica (11th ed.)
