= Andrea Leone Tottola =

Italian opera librettist

- Born: 18th century Naples
- Died: 15 September 1831; Naples
- Occupation: Librettist, poet

Andrea Leone Tottola (died 15 September 1831) was a prolific Italian librettist, best known for his work with Gaetano Donizetti and Gioachino Rossini.

It is not known when or where he was born. He became the official poet to the royal theatres in Naples and agent for the impresario Domenico Barbaia, and started writing librettos in 1802.

His libretto for Gabriella di Vergy, originally set by Michele Carafa in 1816, was reworked by Donizetti in the 1820s and 1830s. He wrote six other librettos for Donizetti, including those for La zingara (1822), Alfredo il grande (1823), Il castello di Kenilworth (1829) and Imelda de' Lambertazzi (1830).

For Rossini he wrote Mosè in Egitto (1818), Ermione (1819), La donna del lago (1819) and Zelmira (1822).

For Vincenzo Bellini he wrote Adelson e Salvini (1825). Other composers who set Tottola's librettos to music included Giovanni Pacini (Alessandro nelle Indie (1824) and others), Saverio Mercadante, Johann Simon Mayr, Nicola Vaccai, Errico Petrella, Ferdinando Paer and Manuel Garcia.

Tottola died in Naples.
