= Giovanni Moretti (composer) =

Italian composer

- Born: 1807; Naples, Italy
- Died: 1884; Ceglie, Italy
- Occupations: composer; conductor

Giovanni Moretti (1807 – 1884) was an Italian composer and conductor active in Naples. He was primarily known for his operas, although he also composed numerous pieces of chamber music, sacred music, and art songs.

== Life and career ==
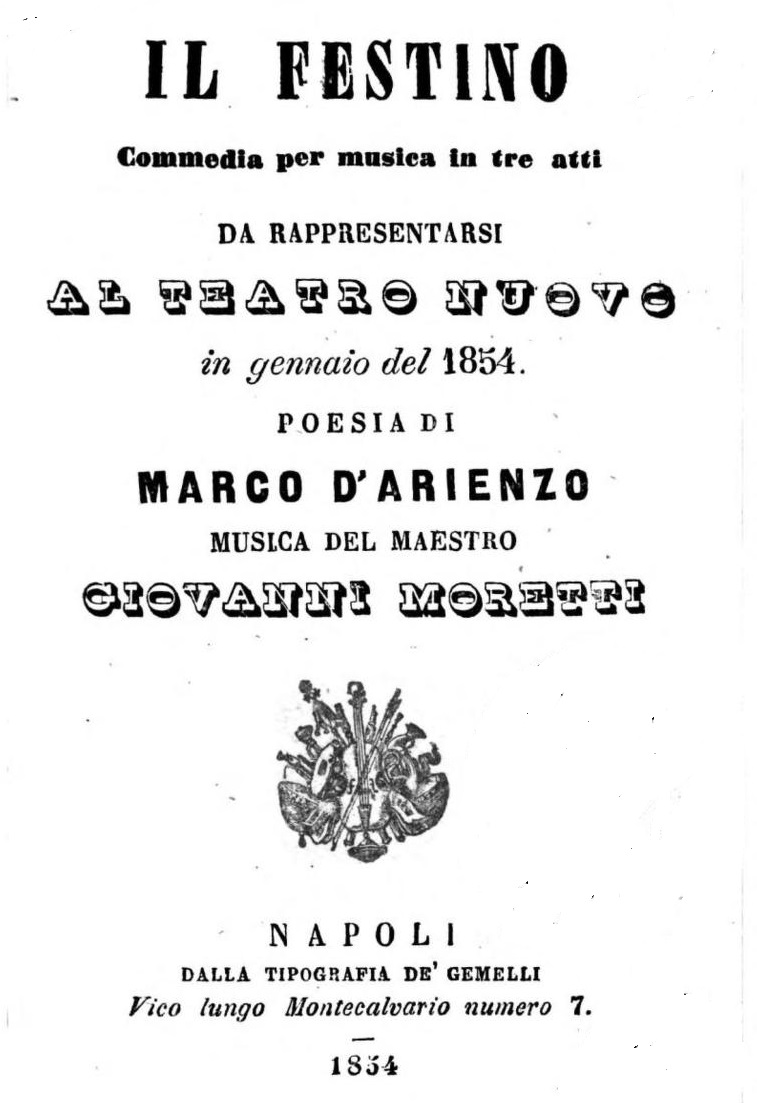
Libretto printed for the 1854 premiere of Moretti's Il festino at the Teatro Nuovo

Moretti was born in Naples. At the age of 10 he began studying piano with Pietro Casella as an external student at the Conservatory of San Pietro a Majella. In 1822 he won a scholarship to study full time at the conservatory where his teachers included Niccolò Zingarelli and Giacomo Tritto. While still a student his azione teatrale, La gioia dei sudditi, was performed at the Teatro Nuovo in 1830 to celebrate the return of Francis I from Spain. Six of his operas composed during his student days were premiered in Naples at the Teatro Fenice and the Teatro Nuovo between 1830 and 1833. Fifteen more premiered over the next 25 years, mostly at the Teatro Nuovo.

Moretti had a parallel career as an opera conductor. He was the music director of the Teatro del Fondo from 1840 to 1842 and of the Teatro Nuovo from 1851 to 1861. During this time he also taught counterpoint and singing at San Pietro a Majella where he was in great demand for students intending a career in opera. The destruction of the Teatro Nuovo when it caught fire in February 1861 was a serious blow to Moretti's career which had centered on that theatre. He composed no more operas after his L'esultanza napoletana which had premiered at the Nuovo in 1860. Over the next ten years he continued to conduct performances in various minor opera houses in Naples such as the Giardino d'Inverno and the Teatro Bellini.

In 1870 Antonio Musella, the former impresario of the Teatro Nuovo took over the management of the Teatro San Carlo, the premiere opera house of Naples, and offered Moretti the position of chief conductor. Moretti's time there was not a success. He was in his 60s and not used to the San Carlo's system of conducting with a baton from the orchestra pit. In the other opera houses in Naples it was still customary for the conductor to stand on the stage and leave the leader of the violin section to mark the tempo.

Writing in 1870, Francesco Florimo noted the ingenious quality and popularity of Moretti's operas—his Policarpio with a libretto by Marco D'Arienzo ran for an entire year at the Teatro Nuovo. However, he lamented that Moretti's lack of personal ambition meant that he had not achieved the acclaim and financial success that should have been his. In Florimo's view, Moretti had unfortunately chosen to enclose himself within the small circle of second-tier opera houses of Naples, contenting himself with little, enough to provide for the present without ever thinking about his future. When the 1870 season at the Teatro San Carlo ended, Musella did not renew Moretti's contract. Not long after that he retired to Ceglie, a small town near Brindisi where he served as the town's bandmaster. He died there at the age of 77. His last years were marked by ill-health and extreme poverty.
