= Joseph Buonomo =

American businessman

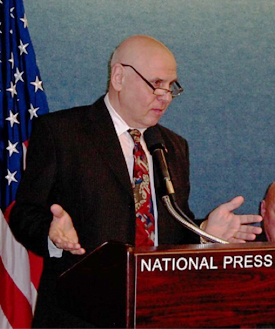
- Joseph Buonomo Addressing the National Press Club, Washington, D.C. December 3, 2009
- Born: Joseph Buonomo; November 28, 1943 (age 81)
- Occupation(s): Co-founder, President and CEO, Direct Computer Resources, Inc.
- Website: at DataVantage.com

Joseph Buonomo (born November 28, 1943) is an American entrepreneur and a co-founder of Direct Computer Resources, an enterprise software company.

== Overview ==
Buonomo has served as DCR's President and CEO since 2000. Prior to that, he was DCR’s Executive Vice President beginning with the company’s inception in 1996. Buonomo was one of the four original developers of the company’s first product, DataVantage for IMS. Under Buonomo’s leadership, DCR has since developed several data-security software products.

He is a member of the board of directors of the Internet Security Alliance and has been active in seeking solutions to issues of cybersecurity.
