= Alfredo il grande =

Opera by Gaetano Donizetti

- Opera by Gaetano Donizetti
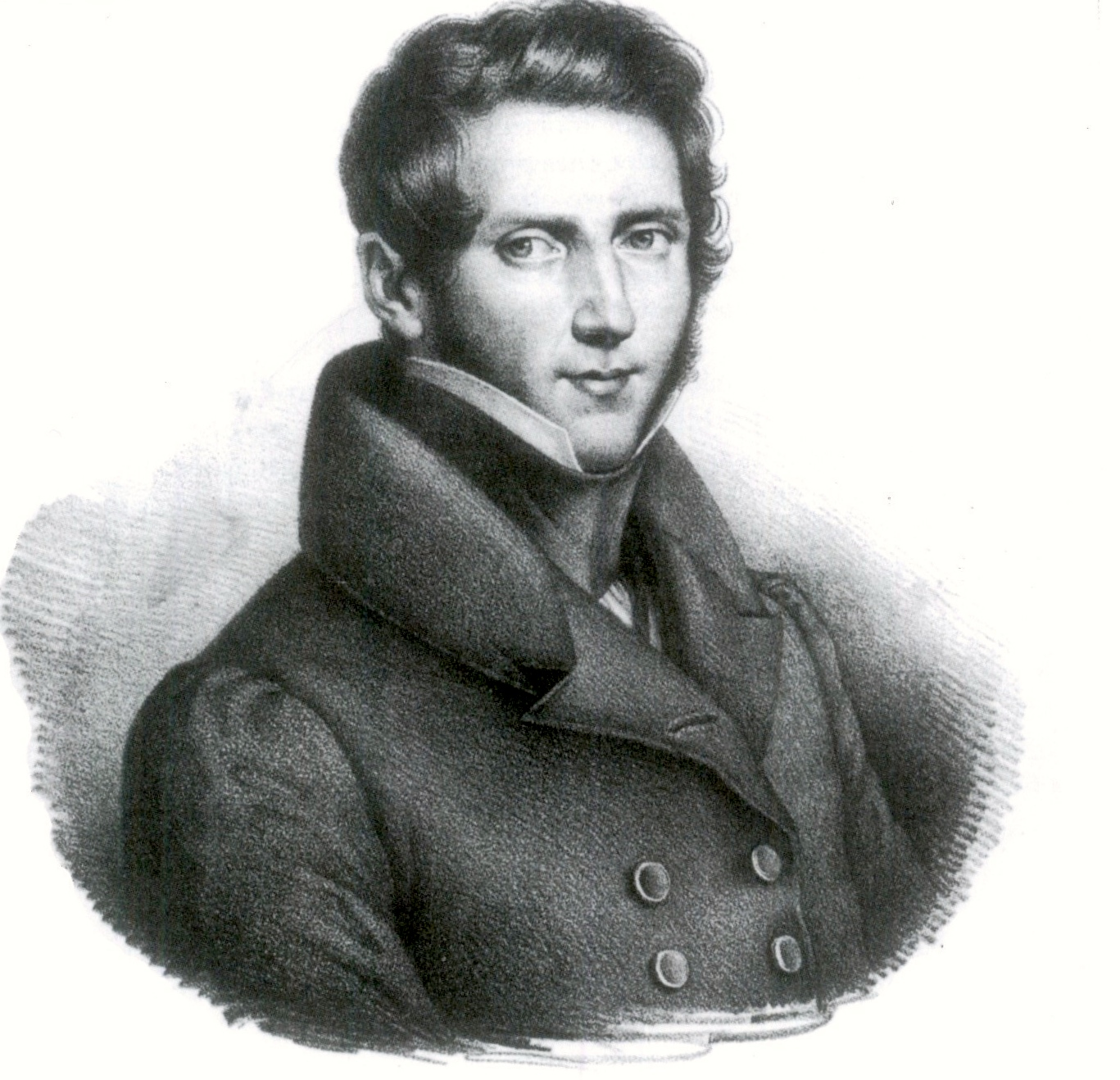
- Donizetti as a young man
- Librettist: Andrea Leone Tottola
- Language: Italian
- Based on: Life of Alfred the Great
- Premiere: 2 July 1823; Teatro San Carlo, Naples

Alfredo il grande (Alfred the Great) is a melodramma serio or serious opera in two acts by Gaetano Donizetti. Andrea Leone Tottola wrote the Italian libretto, which may have been derived from Johann Simon Mayr's 1818 opera of the same name. The opera tells the story of the Anglo-Saxon king Alfred the Great.

This opera, with its "highly Rossini-influenced score" was Donizetti's first exploration into British history, but it turned out to be a spectacular failure. It received its premiere on 2 July 1823 at the Teatro San Carlo in Naples, and this also became its last performance, until a production in November 2023 at the Donizetti Opera Festival in Bergamo, conducted by Corrado Rovaris and based on a critical edition by Edoardo Cavalli.

== Roles ==
Role	Voice type	Premiere Cast, 2 July 1823 (Conductor: Nicola Festa)
Alfredo, King of England	tenor	Andrea Nozzari
Amalia, his Queen	soprano	Elisabetta Ferron
Eduardo, General of the English army	bass	Pio Botticelli
Atkins, General of the Danish army	bass	Michele Benedetti
Enrichetta, an English country girl	mezzo-soprano	Anna Maria Cecconi
Margherita, another country girl	soprano	Gaetana Gorini
Rivers, a Dane	tenor	Gaetano Chizzola
Guglielmo, pastore	tenor	Massimo Orlandini
Chorus of shepherdesses, English warriors, Danish warriors, armed shepherds

== Synopsis ==
Time: The ninth century
Place: Isle of Athelny in Somerset

== Recordings ==
- Opera Rara, 1998. Della Jones Sings Donizetti contains Che potrei dirti, o caro? sung by Della Jones, with Theresa Goble, Ian Platt, Linda Kitchen, Brendan McBride and David Ashman. Royal Philharmonic Orchestra, conductor David Parry. ORR 203.
- Opera Rara, 2004. The Young Donizetti disc contains the cavatina Non é di morte il fulmine sung by Bruce Ford with the London Philharmonia Orchestra, conducted by David Parry. ORR 229.
