= Lauro Rossi =

Italian opera composer (1810–1885)

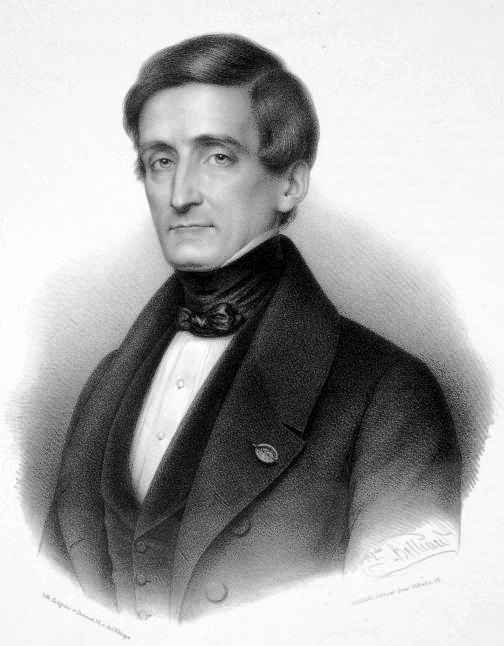
Lauro Rossi

Lauro Rossi (19 February 1810 in Macerata – 5 May 1885 in Cremona), was an Italian composer, particularly of operas. There is no known connection with Luigi Rossi (1597–1653).

== Life and career ==
Rossi studied in Naples and produced his first opera there. His greatest success was with the comic opera originally entitled La casa disabitata, which was performed for many years in its revised form under the title I falsi monetari.

However, Rossi suffered a fiasco in 1835, after which he left Naples for Mexico, then Cuba. There he set up his own opera company, and married its prima donna, Isabella Obermayer. He returned to Italy in 1843 and continued composing, but, thereafter, he was mainly known as an academic figure as director of the Conservatory, first at Milan (1850–1870) and then at Naples (1870–1878). He was commissioned by Giuseppe Verdi to compose a portion of the Messa per Rossini; specifically, Number V. Agnus Dei, for solo Alto.

Two of his late operas were also highly successful: La Contessa di Mons and Cleopatra.

== Operas ==
- Le contesse villane (1829, revised as La villana contessa and also as Le principesse villane, 1830)
- Costanza e Oringaldo (1830, in collaboration with P. Raimondi)
- La sposa al lotto (1831)
- La casa in vendita, ovvero II casino di campagna (1831)
- La scommessa di matrimonio (1831)
- Baldovino, tiranno di Spoleto (1832)
- II maestro di scuola (1832)
- II disertore svizzero, ovvero La nostalgia (1832)
- Le fucine di Bergen (1833)
- La casa disabitata, ovvero Don Eustachio di campagna (1834, revised as I falsi monetari, 1844 and possibly also as Don Eutichio e Sinforosa)
- Amelia, ovvero Otto anni di costanza (1834)
- Leocadia (1835)
- Giovanna Shore (1836)
- II borgomastro di Schiedam (1844, libretto by Giovanni Peruzzini)
- Dottor Bobolo, ovvero La fiera (1845)
- Cellini a Parigi (1845, libretto by Giovanni Peruzzini)
- Azema di Granata, ovvero Gli Abencerragi ed i Zegrini (1846) (libretto by Calisto Bassi)
- La figlia di Figaro (1846)
- Blanca Contarini (1847)
- Il domino nero (1849) revived in Italy, and available on CD
- Le Sabine (1852, libretto by Giovanni Peruzzini)
- L'alchimista (1853)
- La sirena (1855, libretto by Giovanni Peruzzini)
- Lo zigaro rivale (1867)
- Il maestro e la cantante (1867)
- Gli artisti alla fiera (1868)
- La contessa di Mons (1874)
- Cleopatra (1876) revived in 2008
- Biorn (1877)

== Bibliography ==
- Holden, Amanda (with Nicholas Kenyon and Stephen Walsh),The Viking Opera Guide, New York: Viking, 1993 ISBN 0-670-81292-7
