= Luigi Vespoli =

Italian composer

Luigi Vespoli (12 January 1834 – 1861) was an Italian composer. His opera La cantante premiered at the Teatro di San Carlo in Naples on 22 October 1858.
