= Opera semiseria =

Opera genre

Opera semiseria ('semi-serious opera') is an Italian genre of opera, popular in the early and middle 19th century.

Related to the opera buffa, opera semiseria contains elements of comedy but also of pathos, sometimes with a pastoral setting. It can usually be distinguished from tragic operas or melodramas by the presence of a basso buffo. One of the better-known examples is Gaetano Donizetti's Linda di Chamounix. Another example is Gioachino Rossini's La gazza ladra. Vincenzo Bellini's La sonnambula has all the characteristics of the genre except the presence of the required basso buffo and is regarded as both opera seria and opera semiseria.

== See also ==
- Category:Opera semiseria
