= Teatro Nuovo (Naples) =

Theatre in Naples

Coordinates: 40.842816°N 14.246101°E

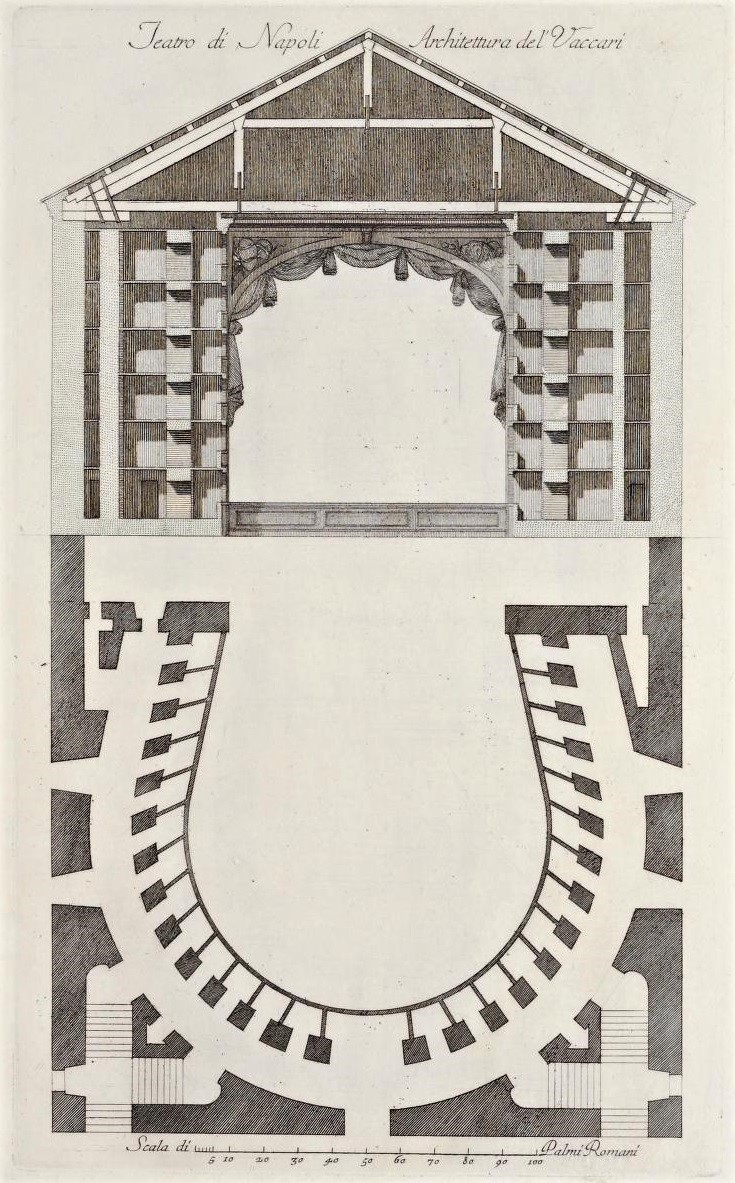
Plan and transverse section of the original theatre erected in 1724

The Teatro Nuovo (New Theatre) is a theatre located on Via Montecalvario in the Quartieri Spagnoli district of Naples. The original theatre was an opera house designed by Domenico Antonio Vaccaro. Completed in 1724, it was also known as the Teatro Nuovo sopra Toledo and the Teatro Nuovo de Montecalvario. The theatre specialised in the opera buffa genre and saw the world premieres of hundreds of operas in its heyday. These included fifteen of Cimarosa's operas and seven of Donizetti's. The present theatre is the third to have been erected on the site following its destruction by fire in 1861 and again in 1935.

== First theatre 1774–1861 ==
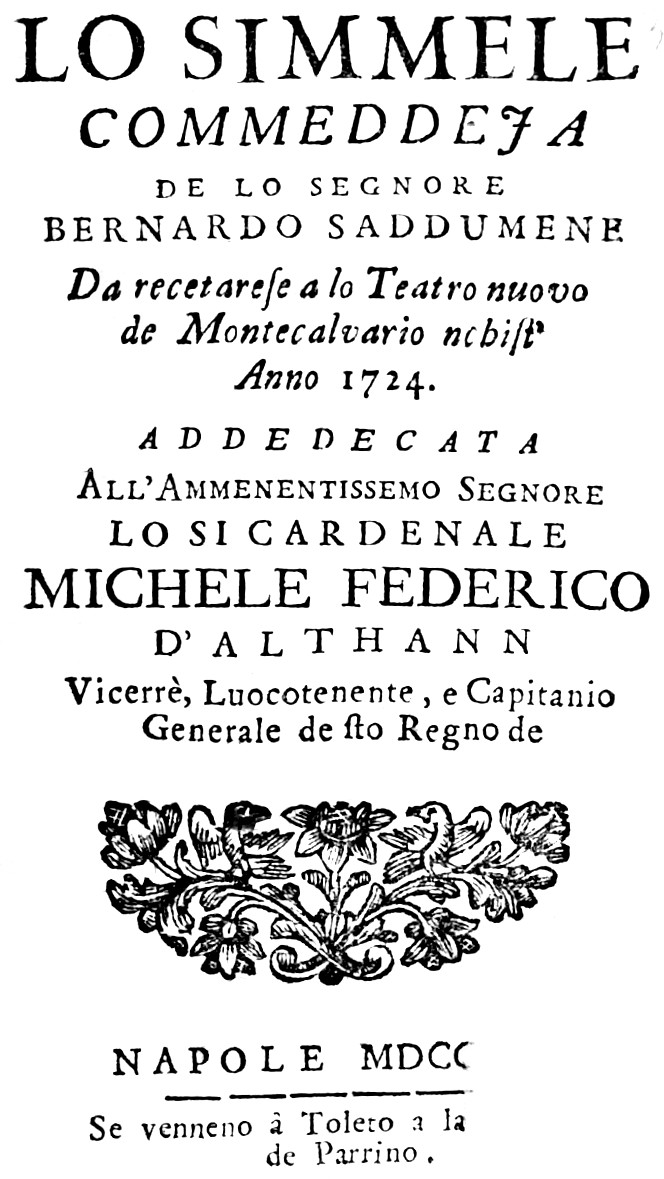
Libretto for Orefice's opera Lo Simmele which inaugurated the theatre in October 1724

The first theatre was originally owned by Giacinto de Laurentis and Angelo Carasale who had it built on a small garden near the church of Santa Maria della Concezione a Montecalvario. It was designed by Domenico Antonio Vaccaro who had also designed the reconstruction of the church. Prior to the construction of the Teatro Nuovo, the Teatro dei Fiorentini was the only theatre in Naples hosting performances of opera buffa written in Neapolitan dialect. It was, however, very small (seating only 250 people), was lit by only two large torches, and had not been originally built as an opera house. The ever-increasing popularity of the opera buffa genre led to local impresarios opening new theatres to accommodate the new audiences. The Teatro della Pace which opened the same year as the Teatro Nuovo was as small as the Fiorentini and had been converted from a private prose theatre in the home of Prince Tiberio Carafa.

The Teatro Nuovo was the first theatre in Naples to be purpose-built for staging opera. It had what would become the classic "horseshoe" shape and was considered to be a marvel of design for the size of the audience it could accommodate on a very small plot of land. With 140 seats in the orchestra stalls and five tiers of thirteen boxes each, it was able to accommodate 1000 spectators. Its capacity, lighting and acoustics led one contemporary commentator to remark that "from the impossible was born the possible". Vaccaro's plans for the Teatro Nuovo would later serve as the basis for the design of the much larger Teatro San Carlo by Giovanni Antonio Medrano.

Carasale and de Laurentis bought the land for their new theatre in March 1724, and seven months later its construction was completed. The Teatro Nuovo was inaugurated on 15 October 1724 with the premiere of Antonio Orefice's comic opera Lo Simmele set to a libretto in Neapolitan dialect by Bernardo Saddumene and dedicated to Michael Friedrich von Althann, the Viceroy of Naples. The theatre was initially run by the impresario Gennaro Donatiello who contracted with Carasale and de Laurentis to pay 650 ducats per year for the right to stage performances there.

Comic operas dominated the theatre's repertoire throughout the 18th century, but it also presented prose comedies during that time, which like the operas were mainly written in Neapolitan dialect. Over the 137 years of its existence, the Teatro Nuovo presented hundreds of world premieres, including fifteen operas by Cimarosa, eleven by Piccinni, and seven by Donizetti. In the 19th century, prose theatre began to dominate, although operas were still performed regularly, many of them composed and performed by students at the San Pietro a Majella conservatory.

The theatre caught fire during the night of 20 February 1861 and was completely destroyed within an hour.

== Second theatre 1864–1935 ==
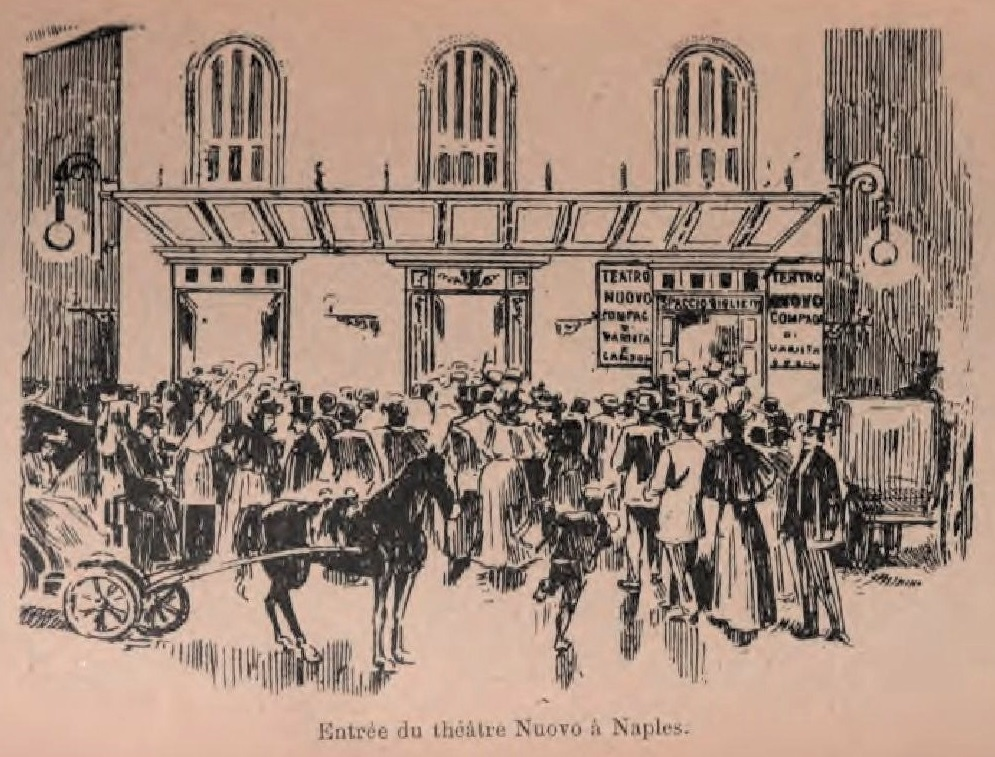
Crowds at the entrance of the Teatro Nuovo c. 1900

Ulisse Rizzi, an architect and the owner of the first theatre at the time it burnt down, rebuilt it on the same site. The new theatre's interior was decorated by Fausto Niccolini, the son of the architect and scenographer Antonio Niccolini. It had a larger stage than the previous theatre and increased seating capacity, although one contemporary writer, Pietro Martorana (1819–1875), observed that the increased number of seats was somewhat to the detriment of the audience's comfort. Under the new theatre's impresario Giuseppe Maria Luzi, comic plays in Neapolitan dialect predominated. Francesco Florimo lamented that the operatic offerings were a "musical hybrid". Forsaking the traditional Neapolitan opera buffa of its glory days, the theatre presented revivals of Italian operas as well as French and Austrian operettas, cast mostly with inferior singers.

By the late 1800s operatic offerings had become few and far between. Amongst them were Nicola D'Arienzo's comic opera La fiera (with a libretto by Salvatore Di Giacomo) which premiered in 1887 and Mario Morelli's L'amico Francesco staged on 15 March 1895. Morelli was an amateur musician who had rented the theatre at his own expense to present his opera to an invited audience. L'amico Francesco was never performed again but it starred the young Enrico Caruso in the title role and marked his professional debut as an opera singer.

In 1888 when the actor Gennaro Pantalena and his company took up residence, the Teatro Nuovo took its first steps towards a more modern version of Neapolitan dialect theatre and presented both comedy and realist drama. Under its impresario Pasquale Molinari, the theatre secured the exclusive rights to produce many of Eduardo Scarpetta's comic plays, but it also produced the premieres of several dramas by Salvatore Di Giacomo, notably his 1909 Assunta Spina which has been characterised by Italian theatre scholar Andrea Bisicchia as "a defining moment in the history of Neapolitan theatre" and a manifesto for the teatro d'arte (art theatre) movement.

The Teatro Nuovo closed in 1914 for the duration of World War I. In the interim, Molinari had died, and when the theatre reopened his son-in-law Eugenio Aulicino took over as impresario. In the post-war years he built up a roster of actors that included the young Eduardo De Filippo, his sister Titina and brother Peppino; Totò; and for a short time, Romilda Villani (the mother of Sophia Loren). On the night of 12 February 1935, shortly after the curtain fell on the revue Mille luci, the Teatro Nuovo caught fire and once again burnt to the ground.

== Third theatre 1985–present ==
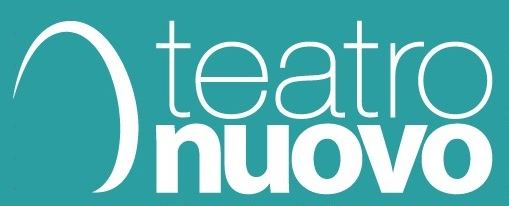
The theatre's logo as of 2017. It incorporates a stylized egg. (Note: The choice of an egg is a pun on the "nuovo" (new) of the theatre's name and the phrase "n'uòvo" which means "an egg" in Neapolitan.)

After World War II, a hotel and cinema were built on the site of the old theatre. Attached to the new building was a warehouse which had been carved out of the remains of the old theatre's auditorium. In the early 1980s, the actors Igina Di Napoli and her husband Angelo Montella conceived the idea of resurrecting the Teatro Nuovo by converting the disused warehouse into a new performing space. It was to become a home for experimental theatre and a training ground for young playwrights, actors and directors. Their first full season began in 1985.

Di Napoli and Montella ran the theatre as a consortium of small companies until 2010. Ownership then passed to Teatro Pubblico Campano, an organization consisting of the regional and local governments of the Campania Region and theatrical and cultural organizations in the region. Alfredo Balsamo has been the General and Artistic Director of the Teatro Nuovo since 2011 when the Teatro Pubblico Campano took over the theatre.

The theatre was refurbished shortly after it passed to the Teatro Pubblico Campano and now has a seating capacity of 248 and a stage 12 metres wide and 7 metres deep. Its 2016–2017 season was inaugurated with a 12 hour "marathon" devoted to the life and work of the playwright and actor Annibale Ruccello who was closely associated with the theatre in the 1980s. In March 2017 the rebirth of the Teatro Nuovo was the subject of a RAI 5 television documentary in the series Napoli in scena.
