= Filippo Coletti =

Italian opera singer (1811–1894)

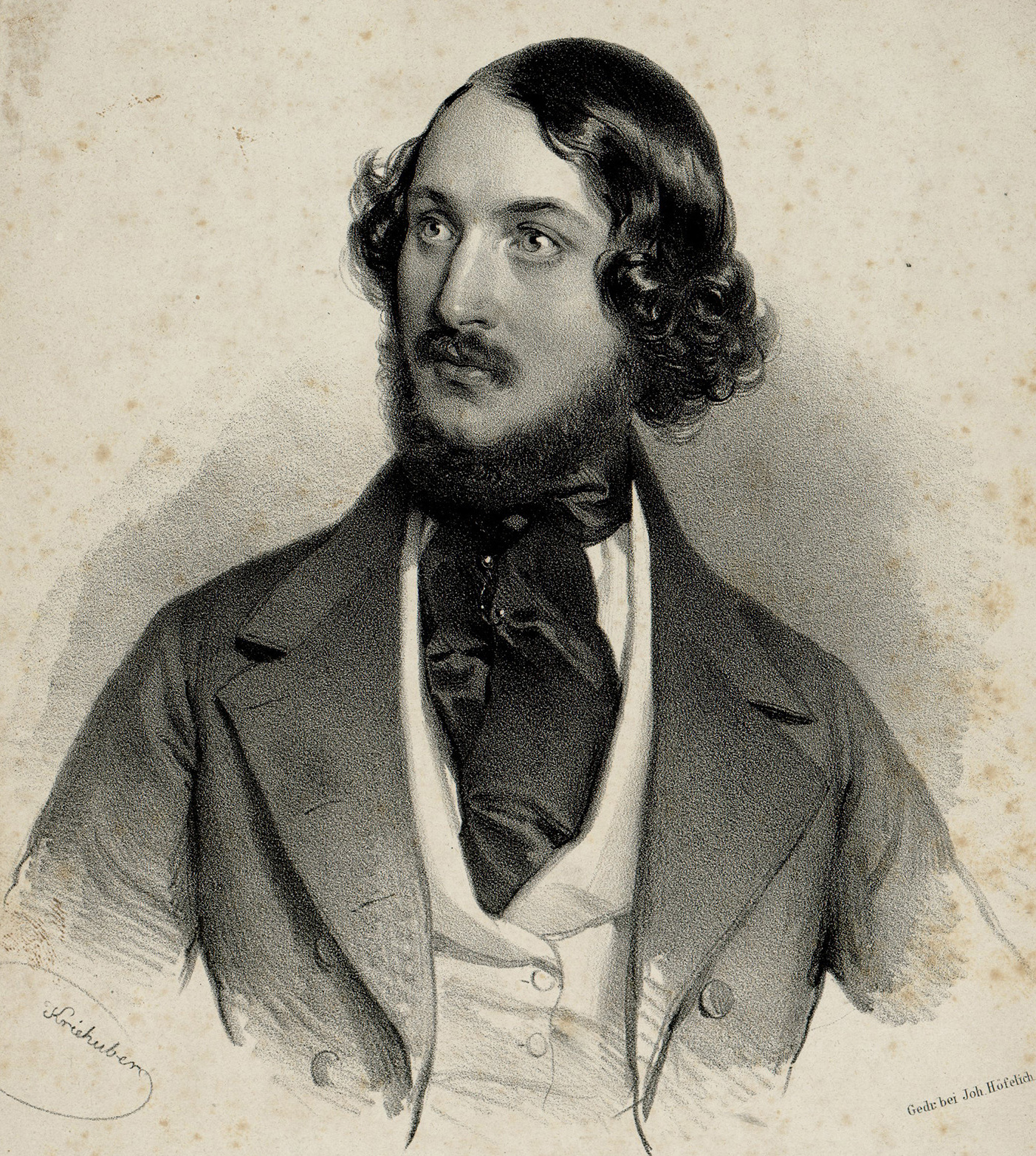
- Filippo Coletti portrayed by Josef Kriehuber (1841)
- Born: 11 May 1811; Anagni, Italy
- Died: 13 June 1894 (aged 83); Anagni, Italy
- Occupation: Opera singer (baritone)
- Years active: 1834–1869

Filippo Andrea Francesco Coletti (11 May 1811 – 13 June 1894) was an Italian baritone associated with Giuseppe Verdi. Coletti created two Verdi roles: Gusmano in Alzira and Francesco in I masnadieri. Verdi revised the role of Germont in La traviata for Coletti, whose interpretation re-defined the role as it is known today. Coletti was, with Antonio Tamburini (1800–1876) and Giorgio Ronconi (1810–1890), one of the three leading baritones of 19th century Italy, an early model of a 'Verdi baritone'.

Born in Anagni, a small town southeast of Rome, Coletti started his career singing baritone coloratura roles in Rossini, Donizetti and Mercadante operas before moving on to vocally substantial Verdi repertory. Coletti gained notoriety in London for his unwitting role in the 1840 Haymarket Theatre riots, and later for his successful four-year London tenure, singing leading baritone roles. Coletti travelled extensively, singing in all major European theatres. Numerous accounts describe his acting as well as the beauty of his voice, which retained an agility and elegance over a long singing career. (Note: Here a quote from an 1871 newspaper article from the L'Indicatore teatrale, Firenze, 17 giugno, 1871, anno V, numero 13] The robust, melodious, flexible, metallic and inspiring voice, combined with the perfect schooling of singing, made Coletti immortal and celebrated.) Coletti performed until 1869. Verdi considered casting Coletti in an unrealized King Lear opera-commission for Naples. After Coletti's retirement from the stage he published an Album Melodico of songs, as well as essays on singing and on opera.

For philosopher Thomas Carlyle Coletti was "by the cast of his face, by the tones of his voice, by his general bearing,... a man of deep and ardent sensibilities, of delicate intuitions, just sympathies; originally an almost poetic soul, or man of genius."

== Family background ==
Filippo Andrea Francesco Coletti was born on 11 May 1811 in Anagni, a medieval town located east-southeast of Rome, in the district of Frosinone.

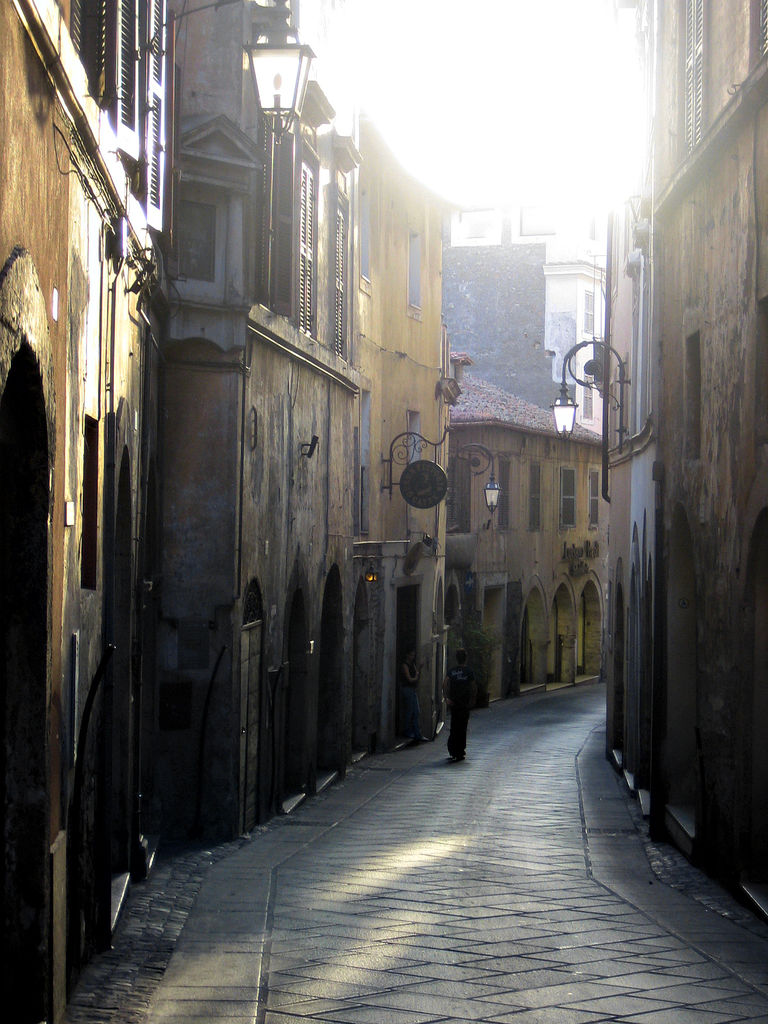
Via Maggiore (now Via Vittorio Emanuele) in Anagni, the street of Coletti's birth house

Coletti's parents, Venanzio Coletti and Angela Viti, were of modest means and education. The Colettis had eight children: Rosa, Filippo, Andrea, Alessandro, Temistocle, Domenico and two other daughters. The family lived in the town center, on the corner of Via Maggiore and Vicolo Cellacchio. With Filippo Coletti's singing fees which were administered by his father Venanzio, the family moved into a large property outside Anagni in 1843. Venanzio continued to invest in land and buildings. Upon the death of Venanzio, the administration was taken over by Coletti's brother Andrea. The Coletti estate exists today as a winery, Coletti-Conti. Coletti's younger brother Domenico was an opera singer who moved to the United States and lived in New York. (Note: Domenico Coletti sang with his brother Filippo in Vienna, in 1841, created the role of Cedrico in Otto Nicolai's Il templario at the Kärtnertortheater in Vienna that same year, appeared in Venice, Rome, Rovigo and Brescia sang in Havana, Cuba, for five months, but seemed to have emigrated in 1850 to the United States. Domenico sang bass and bass-baritone roles in regional travelling opera companies such as the Maratzek, La Grange, Ullman and Vestvali opera companies. He also sang on stage with baritone Giorgio Ronconi in New York. Domenico was married to an opera singer, his son, Paolo Emilio returned to Italy after Domenico's death in 1880. The Athenaeum claims Coletti's "well-toned and expressive baritone voice bears family resemblance to his brother's, and who gave the bravura 'Sol-gate' from Maometto with animation and fair executive power.")

In 1845 the 33-year-old Coletti married the seventeen-year-old Maria, daughter of Anagni's town clerk (Segretario comunale) Giovanni Ambrosi. The marriage was arranged by Coletti's father Venanzio, and proved to be a happy one. Filippo and Maria had four children: Tito, Decio, Lavinia and Valeria. (Note: Tito was born in Anagni in 1846, and who married his childhood love Erminia Conti, after Filippo Coletti concluded a three-year negotiation of the marriage contract with Erminia Conti's father Andrea; Decio, born in Paris, 1848, a talented singer too timid for the stage, who married Countess Teresa Laderchi; Lavinía, who often sang with Coletti in concerts and social occasions, and who died young from a nervous illness; and Valeria, born in Rome, 1853 who married marchese (eng: Marquis) Annibale Ossoli Della Torre.)

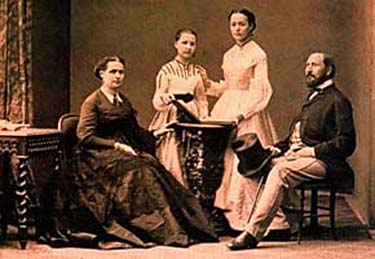
Coletti with wife and daughters

== Early career 1834–1840 ==
Coletti started his musical education in Rome, then moved to the Naples Real Collegio di Musica, where he studied with the tenor Alessandro Busti, a pupil of the castrato Girolamo Crescenti. Busti dedicated to Coletti a Studio di canto per baritono (published 1874). (Note: Alessandro Busti created the role of Duca d'Alziras in Donizetti's La zingara and was a singing teacher in the Real conservatorio di Napoli, and a prolific composer of sacred works as well as singing treatises, including the Studio di canto per baritono (1874, dedicated to Coletti), located at the Biblioteca e Archivio musicale dell'Accademia nazionale di S. Cecilia in Rome. Besides Coletti, Busti's pupils were Alfonso Buonomo (who lost his voice and turned to composition – composer of Cicco e Cola), Gaetano Braga, Vincenzo Curti (pianist), Nicolò Gabrielli, Erennio Gammieri and Raffaele Mirate, See also: Lucie Manén, Bel Canto: The Teaching of the Classical Italian Song-Schools, Its Decline and Restoration, Oxford University Press ISBN 978-0-19-317109-1, numerous mentions of Busti's technique) Coletti débuted at the Teatro del Fondo (1834) as Prosdocimo in Rossini's Il turco in Italia. His performance was considered a great success by the court and launched his career. (Note: Giampiero Raspa, Note biographiche sul baritono Anagnino Filippo Coletti (1811–1894), a Coletti letter is quoted with description of performance success: "I have finally made my first step on the stage of the Reale Teatro del Fondo. ... I am very content with the success, as I was applauded by the court, the public, and was called out front, something that is difficult (to achieve) in these theatres. My whole career depended on this event.")

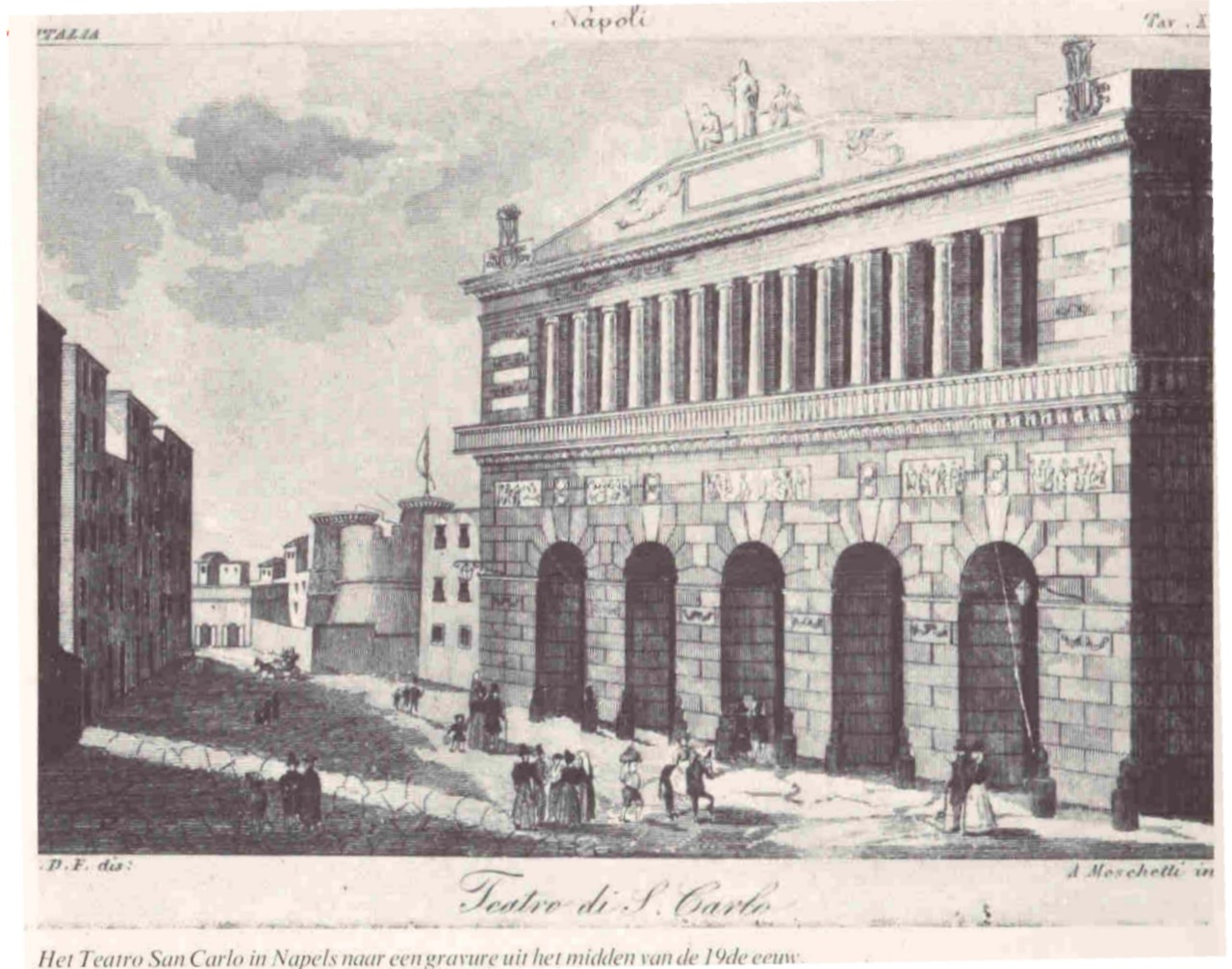
Teatro San Carlo Naples

Coletti transferred to the neighboring Teatro San Carlo, where he sang coloratura and bel canto roles in Vincenzo Bellini's La straniera (Valdeburgo), Rossini's Mosè in Egitto, Maometto II and Semiramide (Assur), (Note: See: The Musical World, volume 22, p. 789, "we must not forget Coletti, who, in the part of Assur received considerable applause from his large manner of acting, and his dramatic style.) as well as Giuseppe Curci's cantata Ruggiero, in January 1835. Later that year Coletti created his first of many roles in a Giovanni Pacini opera – Briano/Wilfredo in Ivanhoe. (Note: The composer Otto Nikolai wrote of this premiere: "the subject is too complicated for an opera. The music is good, but Italian style. The singers were not of the best sort, yet Mr. Coletti, who I had met in Rome before still as a priest, was a good bass.") Beyond Naples, Coletti appeared in the Carlo Felice in Genoa in the 1835–1836 season, sang in Donizetti's Gemma di Vergy at the Teatro Valle in Rome, and in Bellini's I puritani in Padova (1836).

A four-year engagement at the Real Teatro de São Carlos in Lisbon (1837–40) included the first Lisbon production of Mozart's Don Giovanni, operas by the Ricci brothers, (Note: Luigi Ricci (composer) and Federico Ricci) Saverio Mercadante, Giuseppe Persiani and Ferdinand Hérold as well as the title roles of Donizetti's Torquato Tasso (January 1837) and Marin Faliero, Prospero Salsapariglia in Donizetti's Le convenienze ed inconvenienze teatrali and the role of Visconti in Bellini's Beatrice di Tenda. During his time in Lisbon Coletti appeared in a new role almost every week. By the time he left Lisbon, after singing a last Belcore in Donizetti's L'elisir d'amore in November 1840, Coletti had covered most of the bel-canto baritone repertoire of Rossini, Bellini and Donizetti.

== London riot of 1840 ==
Pierre Laporte, the impresario of Her Majesty's Theatre in London, engaged the talented but unknown Coletti as replacement for the public's idol, the baritone Antonio Tamburini, (1800–1876). Laporte hoped to get rid of the expensive Tamburini, thinking Coletti his equal and casting him in I puritani. But as talented as Coletti was, he was not a member of the 'old guard', and the diva Giulia Grisi and others instigated a riot. (Note: Henry Fothergill Chorley writes: "one of the liveliest evenings of the season of 1840 was that of the Tamburini riot ... The intention of ousting this excellent artist, then in his prime, to replace him by Signor Coletti-another excellent singer (through second in order of merit and accomplishment)-was resented with such fiery indignation as has not been often witnessed.")

The opera passed off in perfect quiet; and, indeed, was received with the usual applause, of which Coletti, who has been substituted for Tamburini, received a very considerable share – an indication, no doubt, on the part of the intended insurgents, that there was no personal feeling against this excellent performer. When the opera was over cries began to be raised of "Laporte!" and "Tamburini!" which went on increasing and spreading in all parts of the house, till they swelled into a raging storm.

This riot became a milestone event mentioned in the Musical Times, as late as 1868, when the Haymarket Theatre burned down. R. H. Barham describes the riot in A row in an omnibus (i.e. 'theatre box'): A legend of the Haymarket (from Barham's Ingoldsby Legends):

Though Fiddle-de-dee (i.e. Tamburini) sings loud and clear,
And his tones are sweet, yet his terms are dear!
The "glove won't fit!"
The deuce a bit.
I shall give an engagement to Fal-de-ral-tit!
(i.e. Coletti. Coletti's singing however, failed to convince the audience completely:)

The Prompter bow'd, and he went to his stall,
And the green baize rose at the Prompter's call,
And Fal-de-ral-tit sang fol-de-rol-lol;
But, scarce had he done
When a 'row' begun,
Such a noise was never heard under the sun.
Fiddle-de-dee!
Where is he?
He's the Artiste whom we all want to see!

== Italy 1841–1846 ==
Returning to Europe, Coletti sang in Vienna, Bologna and in Bergamo, where he met Donizetti, who travelled from Milan to Bergamo to hear Coletti perform in his Marin Faliero. Coletti sang Donizetti's Torquato Tasso and Bellini's Beatrice di Tenda in La Scala in 1841, creating there the role of Edmondo in Otto Nicolai's Il Proscritto (1841). After creating the title role of Pacini's Duca d'Alba in Teatro La Fenice (1842) in Venice, Coletti moved to Naples, where he would remain till 1846 as San Carlo's leading baritone. In Naples Giovanni Pacini wrote the role of Piero Zampardi in his opera Fidanzata Corsa (1842) for Coletti; the opera and Coletti's performance proved a hugh success. Coletti created Lusignano in Gaetano Donizetti's Caterina Cornaro (1844). The opera suffered a disastrous opening night, and Donizetti blamed the cast and Coletti for the failure. The relationship between the two was repaired a few months later, when Donizetti returned to Naples to mount Maria di Rohan. In 1845 Coletti created Gusmano in Verdi's Alzira. The tenor Gaetano Fraschini, who sang frequently with Coletti, created the role of Zamoro. (Note: Gaetano Fraschini created numerous Verdi roles: Zamoro in Alzira in 1845, Corrado in Il corsaro 1848, Arrigo in La battaglia di Legnano 1849, the title role in Stiffelio 1850, and Riccardo in Un ballo in maschera 1859. He sang with Coletti frequently, 1842 Pacini's La fidanzata corsa in San Carlo, Naples, 1844 Donizetti's Caterina Cornaro in San Carlo, Naples, 1846 Donizetti's Maria di Rohan at the Kärtnerthortheater in Vienna, 1847 I due Foscari at the Haymarket in London and 1856 Les vêpres siciliennes in Rome. In 1858 Coletti and Fraschini created roles in Gaetano Braga's Il ritratto and Verdi's Simon Boccanegra in Naples.) Eugenia Tadolini sang the role of Alzira. Verdi had insisted on Coletti's participation by contract, and proved faithful to Coletti for many years to come. (Note: Quote: "In the correspondence between Verdi and the impresario of the San Carlo theatre, who had commissioned the opera, the composer posed – amid his conditions – that the cast list of the singers would include Coletti, demonstrating from that time on an appreciation for the singer that would not become less over the successive years." ("Nel carteggio intercorso fra Verdi e l'impresario del S. Carlo, che gli aveva commissionato l'opera, il compositore pose fra le sue condizioni che nell'elenco dei cantanti fosse compreso il Coletti, dimostrando fin da allora per il cantante una stima che non-verrà mai meno negli anni successivi").) Coletti was also Verdi's first choice for the opera Una vendetta in domino intended for Naples and never written.

Coletti sang the 1846 first performance of Verdi's I due Foscari in Paris, and in the season 1847–48 sang the title role of Mozart's Don Giovanni, and in the Rossini's operas La gazza ladra and La donna del lago. Vienna, Prague, Dresden, Leipzig, and Cologne followed.

== Second London period 1847–1851 and I masnadieri ==
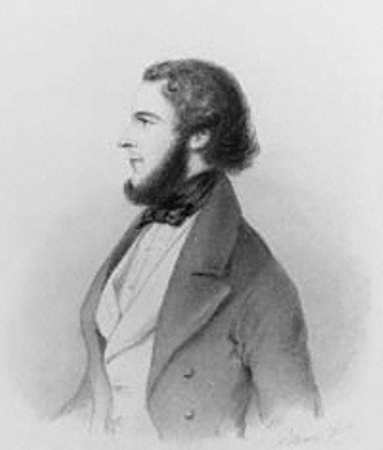
Benjamin Lumley

Following star-baritone Tamburini's defection to Covent Garden, Coletti returned to Her Majesty's Theatre, hired by Laporte's successor, Benjamin Lumley. Lumley chose Verdi's Nabucco "in order to introduce Coletti, who appeared in the part of the maddened king (previously so effectively sustained by Fornasari), and was welcomed with enthusiasm." Benjamin Lumley was determained to procure the best artists for his theatre. He had been corresponding with Giuseppe Verdi

for the purpose of obtaining from him a work destined for the London boards. An opera on the subject of "King Lear" had already been promised by Verdi, the principal part being intended for Signor Lablache. But, on that occasion, the serious illness of the composer had prevented the execution of the design. Verdi now offered his "Masnadieri", composed upon the subject of Schiller's well-known play, "Die Räuber", and with this proposal I was obliged to close. On Thursday, 2 July, I masnadieri (after wearying rehearsals, conducted by the composer himself), was brought out, with a cast that included Lablache, Gardoni, Coletti, Bouche, and, above all, Jenny Lind, who was to appear for the second time only in her career, in a thoroughly original part composed expressly for her. The house was filled to overflowing on the night of the first representation. The opera was given with every appearance of a triumphant success : the composer and all the singers receiving the highest honours. Indeed, all the artists distinguished themselves in their several parts. Jenny Lind acted admirably, and sang the airs allotted to her exquisitely. (Note: Benjamin Lumley, Memoires of the Opera, pp. 192–193. Lumley continues with a description of the moderate success of I masnadieri: "But yet the Masnadieri could not be considered a success. That by its production I had adopted the right course was unquestionable. I had induced an Italian composer, whose reputation stood on the highest pinnacle of continental fame, to compose an opera expressly for my theatre, as well as to superintend its production. More I could not have done to gratify the patrons of Italian music, who desired to hear new works. It may be stated, in confirmation of the judgment of the London audience, that I masnadieri was never successful on any Italian stage. The libretto was even worse constructed than is usually the case with adaptations of foreign dramas to the purpose of Italian opera. To Her Majesty's Theatre the work was singularly ill-suited. The interest which ought to have been centred in Mademoiselle Lind was centred in Gardoni; whilst Lablache, as the imprisoned father, had to do about the only thing he could not do to perfection" having to represent a man nearly starved to death." (p. 193))

For Coletti the role creation of Francesco in Verdi's I masnadieri, conducted by Verdi himself, was a personal success: "Coletti's reception by the public on Saturday night had added another laurel to Mr. Lumley's brow, and has given the public increased confidence in all the promises set forth in his so fiercely catechized prospectus. Never was an opera season so auspiciously commenced. Verdi had re-written the cabaletta of his aria for Francesco 'Tremate o Miseri' after hearing Coletti's voice. Coletti remained present in London until 1850, singing diverse roles in the Italian baritone repertoire, performing in Linda di Chamounix, I Puritani, L'elisir d'amore, and most notably the Doge in Verdi's I due Foscari. In London Coletti created roles in Sigismond Thalberg's Florinda and Balfe's I quattro fratelli, as well as the role of Ferdinand in Halévy's La tempesta in 1850.

== Maturity 1848–1861 ==
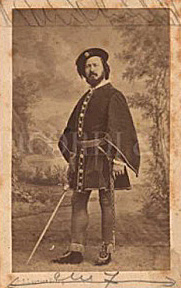
Filippo Coletti in Madrid, dressed in opera costume from Ricordi Milan archive

Coletti performed for three seasons in St Petersburg (1848–51) singing in Verdi's I Lombardi and Rossini's Guglielmo Tell. He also travelled as far as the United States. He also performed in Madrid in the 1851–1852 season.

In Rome Coletti sang Rigoletto in 1851, (the opera given under the censured title 'Viscardello'), I due Foscari, Un ballo in maschera (T. Apollo, 1854) and I vespri siciliani (T. Argentina, 1856). He also created the role of Hamlet in Luigi Moroni's Amleto (1860).

In Venice La Fenice Coletti sang in Lucia di Lammermoor, Verdi's I due Foscari and Stiffelio (1852) (which he sang in La Scala as well, in 1851). In 1854 Verdi transposed down the part of Germont in La traviata for him. This version, as performed at the Venice Teatro Gallo, (Teatro San Benedetto) became definitive: The Gazzetta Musicale di Milano maintained that Coletti, in this revival of La Traviata, "had made one know the character of Germont for the first time truly, that Coletti would then proceed to interpret innumerable times in all theatres of Italy"

In 1857 Coletti created the title role of Saverio Mercadante's Pelagio at the Teatro S Carlo, Naples (1857). Verdi was considering Coletti as the title role in his opera Re Lear for Naples, (which he never wrote). In a letter from that period regarding a revival of Simon Boccanegra, Verdi writes:

If you really intend to mount Boccanegra, an ideal cast would be Coletti, Fraschini and Penco as well as a Basso profundo, which one would still need to find. It would be a mistake to perform this opera with another cast! There is no one better than Coletti for the Doge.

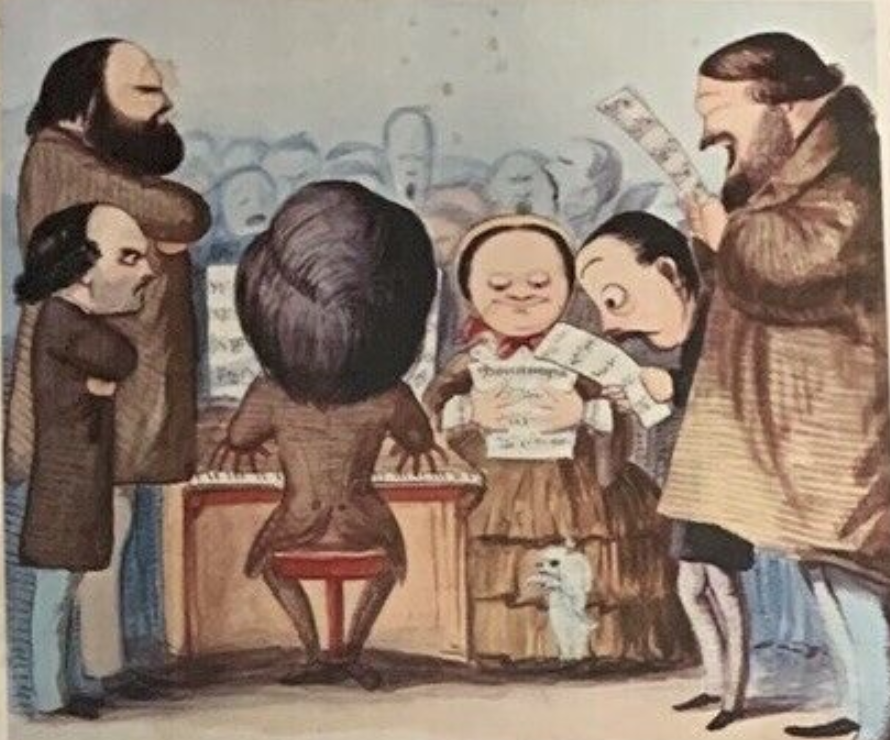
Melchiorre Delfico Verdi rehearsing, Coletti standing to his right

In 1858 the caricaturist Melchiorre Delfico drew Verdi at the piano rehearsing Simon Boccanegra Verdi is depicted at the piano with his back to the viewer, Coletti to his right, reading off a sheet of music while Fraschini and the rest of the Simon Boccanegra cast stand around staring. (Note: Coletti was seen on the cover for Opera News in January 1974, in Delfico's caricature; a discussion of Delfico and this specific caricature, see: Anna Maria Ioannoni Fiore, Fiorella Fumo and Tania Gatto, Music in Art, Vol. 34, No. 1/2, Music, Body, and Stage: The Iconography of Music Theater and Opera (Spring–Fall 2009), pp. 229–243, Published by: Research Center for Music Iconography, The Graduate Center, City University of New York)

== Retirement from the stage ==
In the season 1861–1862 Coletti, no longer first choice in Italy, found work in the Teatro Real, Madrid, singing in Donizetti and Verdi operas as well as Achille Peri's Giuditta. In Naples he created his last new role – Appio Claudio in Errico Petrella's Virginia; But Coletti's voice had deteriorated to the extent that he was forced into retirement. After a few years of teaching and living alternately between Rome and Anagni, Coletti wrote Verdi in 1866 asking for help. Verdi responded with warmth and delicacy, but could not help him. (Note: Verdi writes: "I am desolate that I cannot serve you, but you understand that in my current position I cannot make one step without losing dignity, the only security being knowing I will achieve nothing.")

Coletti attempted a brief comeback in 1867, singing the bass role of Mefistofeles in Gounod's Faust in Palermo, earning applause and a polite review. (Note: "More than anyone else earned clamorous ovations La Berini [soprano Enrichetta Berini], who sang the ingenious role of Marguerite, and the baritone Coletti, who sustained with majesty and talent the difficult personality of Mefistofeles, characterizing him realistically" quoted in Guido Leone, L'opera a palermo dal 1653 al 1987 p. 441, publisicula editrice, 1988, ASIN: B00450KR04) Another bass role Coletti sang that year was Filippo II in Verdi's Don Carlo in Turin. Always a beloved artist in San Carlo in Naples, Coletti was rehired for the 1868–69 season, but after a "tempestuous performance of the opening opera of the season, Jone by E. Petrella on 28 October, he dissolved the contract and retired for good". (Note: Quote from: "Coletti Filippo", Dizionario Biografico degli Italiani, vol. 26, pp. 734–736, Rome 1982. "... ma dopo una tempestosa esecuzione della prima opera della stagione, sciolse il contratto ritirandosi definifivamente." An Amadeus Online reference of a Coletti performance of the title role in Ambroise Thomas' Hamlet in New York in 1872 is most improbable; possibly Coletti's brother Domenico was involved, however Domenico sang bass repertoire usually.) Coletti moved to Rome, then to his hometown Anagni. In his later years Coletti became involved with Anagni civic duties, as well as teaching – (Édouard de Reszke was one of his pupils) and writing. Coletti published an Album Melodico of songs a treatise on singing, La scuola di canto italiano (Rome, Forzani, 1880), (Note: Coletti's treatise is not in print, but Cesare Corsi quotes from it in his Thoughts on singing and the didactic works of Filippo Coletti(in Italian)]. Coletti claims that the masters of singing of the Rossini and previous eras, didn't use written or printed singing 'methods', but rather a sheet of paper. On this they noted wrote exercises, and kept adding trills, gruppetti etc. to these sheets which were used for many years. Thus the pupils mastered emission of voice, agility, accents, phrasing, breath control, registration, colouring and pronunciation. each time with the addition of more sheets of paper. Coletti claims that the great secret of the art was in the very first sheet the pupil received "(F. Coletti, The school of singing, p. 9) "The Italian schools of singing, ... arrived at such a point of fame, that the primary cities of Europe, charmed of the beauty and skill of our voices, received us everywhere with applause and rewards. The Italian opera abroad became the meeting point of the most selected part of the nation, and our singing method has become a model of beauty and elegance. The Italian theatre is still vigorous in those countries of progressive civility, but only by name and language, since the works and the companies that represent it are no longer exclusively Italian, but cosmopolitan. Next to the Italian artist one can hear – in our own theatres as well – the French artist, the German, the Spanish and the English; and they all sing in their own language, nevertheless with emission of voice and corresponding pronunciation to the nature of their native language." (F. Coletti, The school of singing p. 56). Cesare Corsi, Le riflessioni sul canto e le opera didattiche di Filippo Coletti) and an essay on the state of Italian opera, L' Arte Melodrammatica Italiana (Rome, Forzani, 1883). Nothing much is known of his last years in Anagni. Coletti was working on a 'method of singing', which remained unfinished at his death. His manuscript breaks off at the point where he writes: "I cease writing musical notes because my sight, weakened by my old age, is becoming ever more obscured, hence I need to suspend my work, with the intention of continuing it and completing it if the good Lord wants to keep me living for a bit longer". (Note: Quoted in Cesare Corsi, Le riflessioni sul canto e le opera didattiche di Filippo Coletti)

Coletti died in 1894. In his obituary, The Musical Times of 1 August 1894 said of Coletti: "he is also memorable as the sole performer in whom Carlyle saw any merit on his famous visit to the opera".

== Critical appreciation ==
Philosopher and writer Thomas Carlyle: "One singer in particular, called Coletti or some such name, seemed to me, by the cast of his face, by the tones of his voice, by his general bearing, so far as I could read it, to be a man of deep and ardent sensibilities, of delicate intuitions, just sympathies; originally an almost poetic soul, or man of genius, as we term it;" (Note: Complete quote: "Of the Haymarket Opera my account, in fine, is this: Lustres, candelabras, painting, gilding at discretion; a hall as of the Caliph of Alraschid, or him that commanded the slaves of the Lamp; a hall as if fitted-up by the genii, regardless of expense. Upholstery, and the outlay of human capital, could do no more. Artists, too, as they are called, have been got together from the ends of the world, regardless likewise of expense, to do dancing and singing, some of them even geniuses in their craft, stamped by Nature as capable of far other work than squalling here, like a blind Samson, to make the Philistines sport!")

Italian opera composer Giovanni Pacini, from his Memoires: "The celebrated Coletti in the role I entrusted him was not able to be surpassed by any other artist. Even Paris, when my fortunate work was presented at the Theatre Italienne, proclaimed Coletti 'The Greatest', 'unreachable'."

From the nineteenth-century British music journal Musical World: "The faults we have to lay to his charge – for which of us is without them? – are a want of colour in his expression, a monotony in the form of his cadences, and a method of reaching the high notes, which belongs to a bad school of singing." (Note: More complete quote: "Coletti has, perhaps, the most splendid baritone voice we ever listened to. ... Coletti's style is energetic and manly, and the tones of his powerful and magnificent voice fill the entire area of Her Majestie's Theatre. His voice is musical equal to the degree of its power. The faults we have to lay to his charge – for which of us is without them? – are a want of colour in his expression, a monotony in the form of his cadences, and a method of reaching the high notes, which belongs to a bad school of singing. ... His unusual faultlessness of intonation gives him a great advantage over Ronconi ... and the power of his lungs would enamble him to drown the mellow baritone of Tamburini. But on the other hand Ronconi, in the midst of his vacillating intonation, possesses a variety of style, and a passionate intensity of expression, which would leave Coletti far behind him in the higher requisites of dramatic song; while Tamburini, as a flexible vocalist, and an actor of various powers, is equally his superior.)

Lexicographer Francesco Regli writes: "One observes with great astonishment the ease with which he executed the most difficult of roles, dramatic as well as those of agility, the extraordinary extension of his voice and the colour that is so indispensable in the various characters in the music." (Note: More extensive quote: "One could say that Coletti in his career never had one moment of repose ... In order to sing at such an advanced age he never ceased studying ... One observes with great astonishment the ease with which he executed the most difficult of roles, dramatic as well as those of agility, the extraordinary extension of his voice and the colour that is so indispensable in the various characters in the music. He is perhaps the only artist that could be proud of so many exquisite talents, talents he owed not only to nature, but to perseverance and dedication in study. The facility with which he vocalized, the fact that he always maintains perfect intonation, offering his listener an always consistent vocal timbre. Always sonorous. He is without paragon ...)

Portraits of the three baritone rivals, by Josef Kriehuber

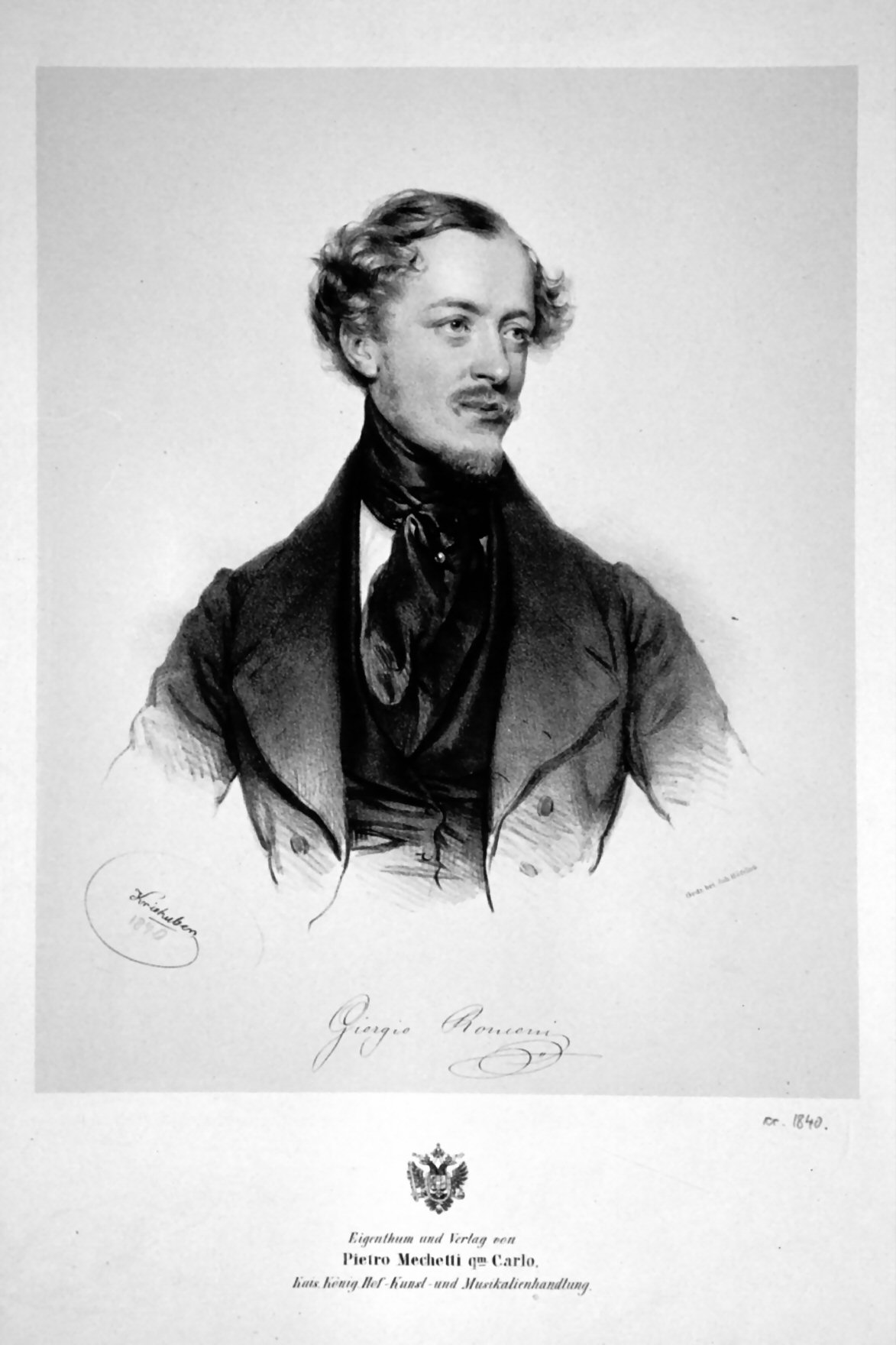
Giorgio Ronconi

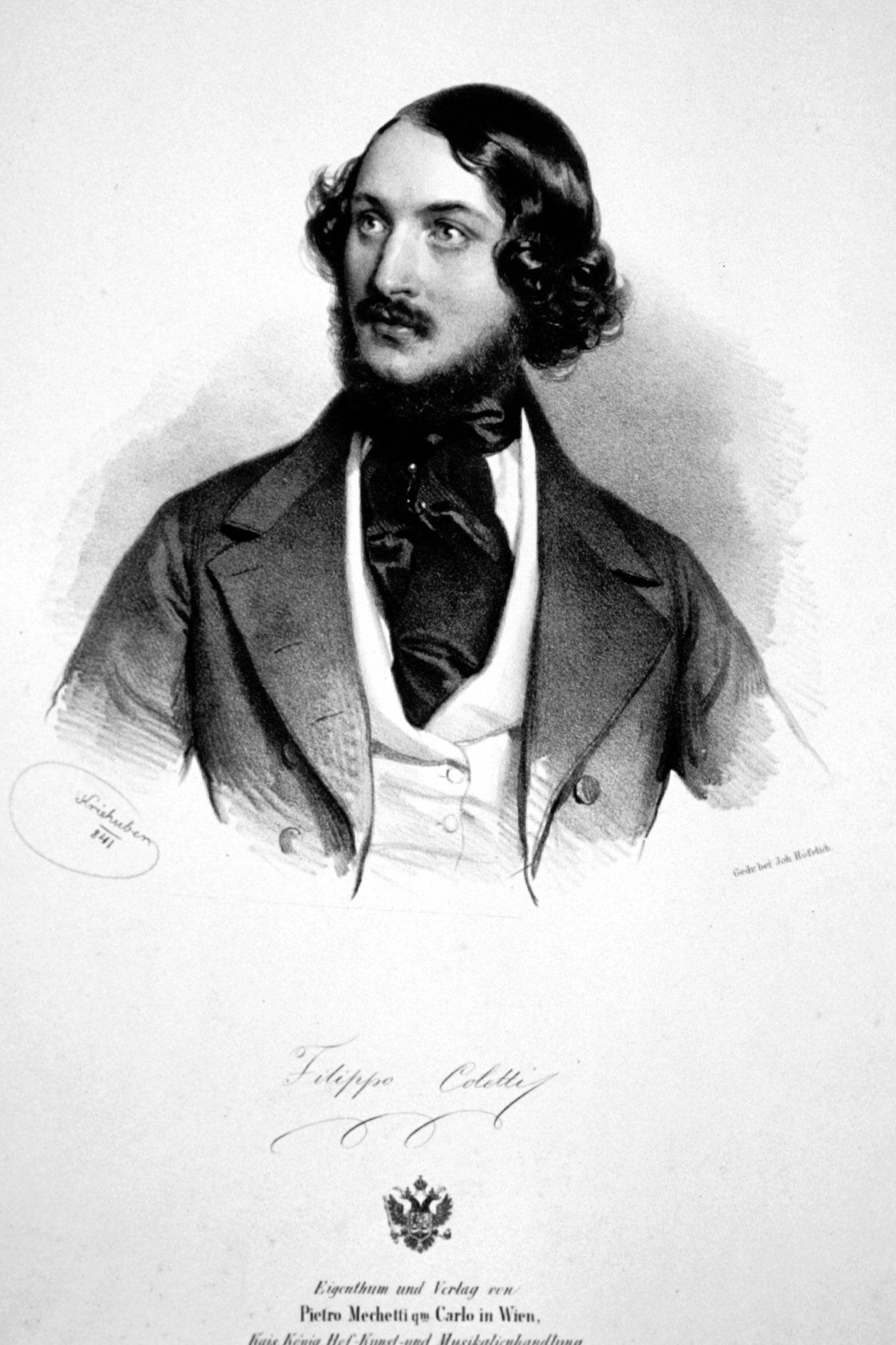
Filippo Coletti

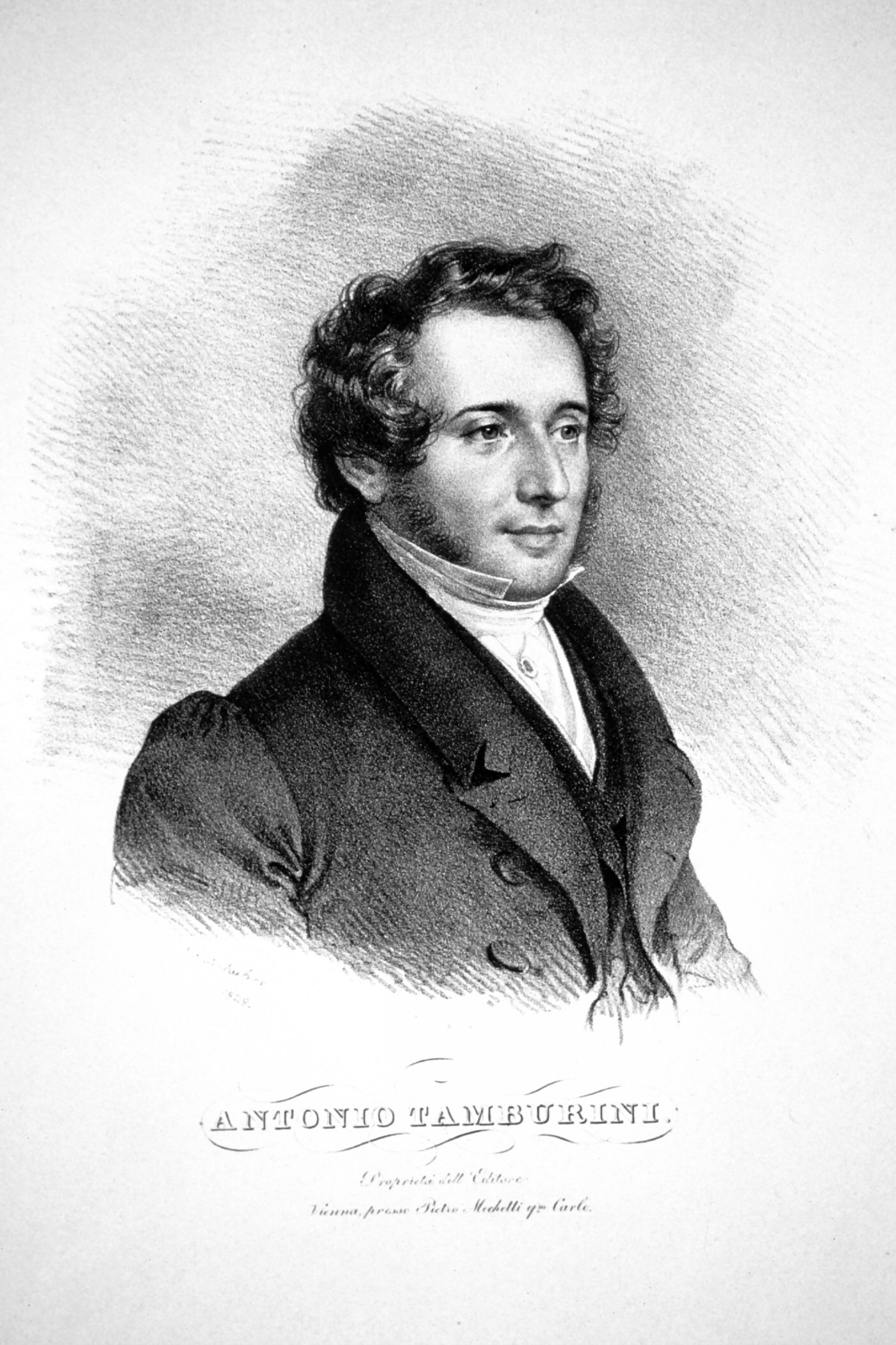
Antonio Tamburini II

== Roles created ==
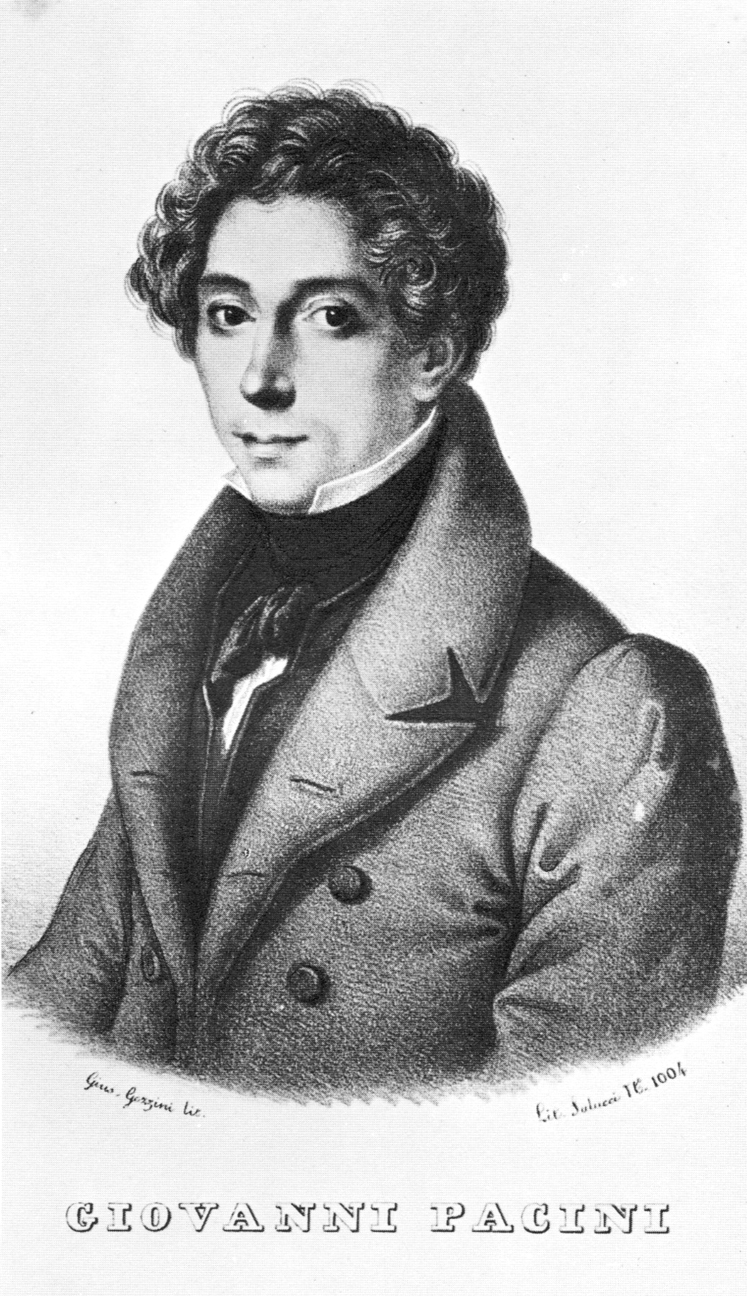
Composer Giovanni Pacini – Coletti created 6 roles in Pacini's operas

- 1835 Briano/Wilfrido Giovanni Pacini Ivanhoe Teatro San Carlo, Naples
- 1836 Rodolfo/Alì Pascia Tommaso Genoves (Spanish composer Tomás Genovés y Lapetra) La battaglia di Lepanto, Teatro Valle, Rome
- 1841 Edmondo Otto Nicolai Il Proscritto, La Scala, Milan
- 1841 Cantareno Carlo Emery Coen (the artistic name of composer Henry Cohen) Antonio Foscarini, Teatro del Comune, Bologna
- 1842 Piero Zampardi Giovanni Pacini La fidanzata corsa Teatro San Carlo, Naples
- 1842 Egbert Alessandro Curmi Elodia di Herstall 26 September 1842 with Eugenia Tadolini as Elodia
- 1842 Duca d'Alba Giovanni Pacini Duca d'Alba Teatro La Fenice, Venice
- 1844 Lusignano Gaetano Donizetti Caterina Cornaro Teatro San Carlo, Naples
- 1844 Pietro Candiano IV Giovanni Battista Ferrari Candiano quarto Teatro Gallo San Benedetto, Venice
- 1844 Francesco Sforza Vincenzo Battista (Italian composer 1823–1873) Margherita d'Aragona Teatro San Carlo, Naples
- 1845 Gusmano Giuseppe Verdi Alzira Teatro San Carlo, Naples
- 1845 Rodrigo Saverio Mercadante Il Vascello de Gama, Teatro San Carlo, Naples
- 1845 Gianni di Capua, Giovanni Pacini Stella di Napoli, Teatro San Carlo, Naples
- 1847 Francesco Giuseppe Verdi I masnadieri Haymarket Theatre, London
- 1850 Ferdinand Halévy La tempesta (The Tempest) Haymarket Theatre, London
- 1851 Ivon Michael William Balfe I quattro fratelli Haymarket Theatre, London
- 1851 Manuzza Sigismond Thalberg Florinda Haymarket Theatre, London
- 1851 Morillo Gualtiero Sanelli (It. comp. and tenor Ferdinando Sanelli 1816–1861) Tradito! La Fenice, Venice
- 1856 Luchino Visconti, Giovanni Pacini Margherita Pusterla Teatro San Carlo, Naples
- 1857 Pelagio Saverio Mercadante Pelagio Teatro San Carlo, Naples
- 1857 Carlo Gonzaga Vincenzo Moscuzza Carlo Gonzaga Teatro San Carlo, Naples
- 1858 Guglielmo Belfegor-saltimbanco Giovanni Pacini Il saltimbanco, Teatro Argentina, Rome
- 1860 Claudio Luigi Moroni (Italian composer, 1823–1898) Amleto
- 1861 Appio Claudio Errico Petrella Virginia, Teatro San Carlo, Naples

== Bibliography ==
- Barham, Richard Harris, (Thomas Ingoldsby), The Ingoldsby Legends, Or Mirth and Marvels, 1840 – 1870, Modern Edition: Carol Hart, Editor., Ingoldsby Legends, Volume 2, SpringStreet Books; annotated edition (2013), ISBN 978-0-9795204-8-8
- Budden, Julian, The Two Traviatas, Proceedings of the Royal Musical Association, Vol. 99, (1972–1973), Pub. Taylor & Francis pp. 43–66
- Carlyle, Thomas (1854). "The Opera". Archived from the original on 1 March 2004.
- Chorley, Henry Fothergill Thirty Years' Musical Recollections, Volume 1, London: Hurst and blackett, Publishers, 1862, P.183; Modern edition: Cambridge University Press (2009) ISBN 978-1-108-00140-3
- Cox, J. E. Musical Recollections of the Last Half-Century (London, 1872), Modern Ed. HardPress Ltd (2013), ISBN 978-1-314-08312-5
- Davison, J. W., Music During the Victorian Era. from Mendelssohn to Wagner; Being the Memoirs of J. W. Davison, Forty Years Music Critic of "The Times", Compiled by his Son, Henry Davison (London, 1912); Modern Ed. Cambridge Scholars Publishing (2010), ISBN 978-1-153-04567-4
- Harwood, Gregory W. Giuseppe Verdi: A Research and Information Guide (Routledge Music Bibliographies)2012, ISBN 978-0-415-88189-0
- Leone, Guido L'opera a palermo dal 1653 al 1987, Publisicula editrice, 1988, ASIN: B00450KR04
- Lumley, B., Reminiscences of the Opera, Hurst and Blackett, London, 1864
- Raspa, Giampiero "Note biografiche sul baritono anagnino Filippo Coletti (1811–1894)", in Scritti in memoria di Giuseppe Marchetti Longhi, vol. II, pp. 483ff., Istituto di Storia e di Arte del Lazio Meridionale, 1990. In Italian.
- Review of Coletti's composition for Chorus, 1874 (in Italian)
- Mult. Authors, "Atti del Convegno su Filippo Coletti", in Latium – Rivista di studi storici – Istituto di Storia e di Arte del Lazio Meridionale, 1996, 13 (Atti del convegno tentuoso nel 1994 ad Anagni, in occasione del centenario della morte di Filippo Coletti. This book contains the following essays from the 1994 convention on Filippo Coletti (all in Italian):
  - Julian Budden, Coletti a Londra, p. 121ff.
  - Tommaso Cecilia, Filippo Coletti e la vita musicale in Anagni nella prima metá dell'ottocento pp. 159ff.
  - Cesare Corsi, Le riflessioni sul canto e le opere didattiche di Filippo Coletti, pp. 145ff.
  - Giorgio Gualerzi, Un baritono " storico " per Verdi, p. 115ff.
  - Pierluigi Petrobelli, Coletti e Verdi, p. 105ff.
- Teatro La Fenice, Programme notes for Maria di Rohan 1999
- Zicari, Massimo. Verdi in Victorian London. Cambridge, UK: Open Book Publishers, 2016.

== Images (sources) ==
- Head-and-shoulders portrait of Filippo Coletti, 19th century baritone opera singer in Rome, 1852
- Filippo Coletti in Rossini's Semiramide
- Filippo Coletti in Madrid, dressed in opera costume, photo by Laurant, Madrid; from Ricordi Milan archive

== Bibliography: Dictionary entries ==
- Laura Macy, Ed. The Grove Book of Opera Singers, Harold Rosenthal/Julian Budden, entry "Coletti, Filippo"
- entry "Coletti, Filippo" in Dizionario Biografico degli Italiani, vol. 26, pp. 734–736, Rome 1982
- entry "Coletti, Filippo" in Enciclopedia dello spettacolo, vol. III, column 1065–66
- Francesco Regli, Dizionario biografico, Turin, 1860, p. 135, entry "Coletti, Filippo"

== Filippo Coletti writings (in Italian) ==
- Coletti, Filippo, La Scuola di Canto in Italia : pensieri dell'Artista / Cav. Filippo Coletti, Rome : Forzani e C.,
- Coletti, Filippo, L' Arte melodrammatica italiana : patrocinata dall'onorevole Bovio nella Camera dei Deputati : considerazioni / dell'artista Filippo Coletti, Rome : Forzani e C., 1883
- Coletti, Filippo, Sullo stato materiale e morale della Città di Anagni : considerazioni dirette ai signori della giunta municipale anagnina / dall'assessore Filippo Coletti, Rome : Tip. dell'Unione Cooperativa Editrice, 1891
