= Virginia (Mercadante) =

Opera by Saverio Mercadante

Saverio Mercadante

Virginia is an opera, a tragedia lirica, in three acts by composer Saverio Mercadante. The Italian libretto by Salvadore Cammarano is based on Vittorio Alfieri's tragedy of the same name. Alfieri's play was in turn taken from a story in Livy's Ab Urbe condita. Although initially written for performance in 1850 at the Teatro di San Carlo in Naples, the subject matter of Mercadante's opera was objected to by the Bourbon government censors and performance was banned outright. That decision was widely ridiculed, not just in Italy, but throughout Europe. After the fall of the Kingdom of the Two Sicilies in 1861, the ban on the opera no longer existed.

The work finally had its premiere on 7 April 1866 at the Teatro di San Carlo. Although not the last opera composed by Mercadante, it was the last of his operas to reach the stage. Virginia has been rarely performed since its premiere, but a recent 2009 recording of the work was released on the Opera Rara label.

== Composition history ==
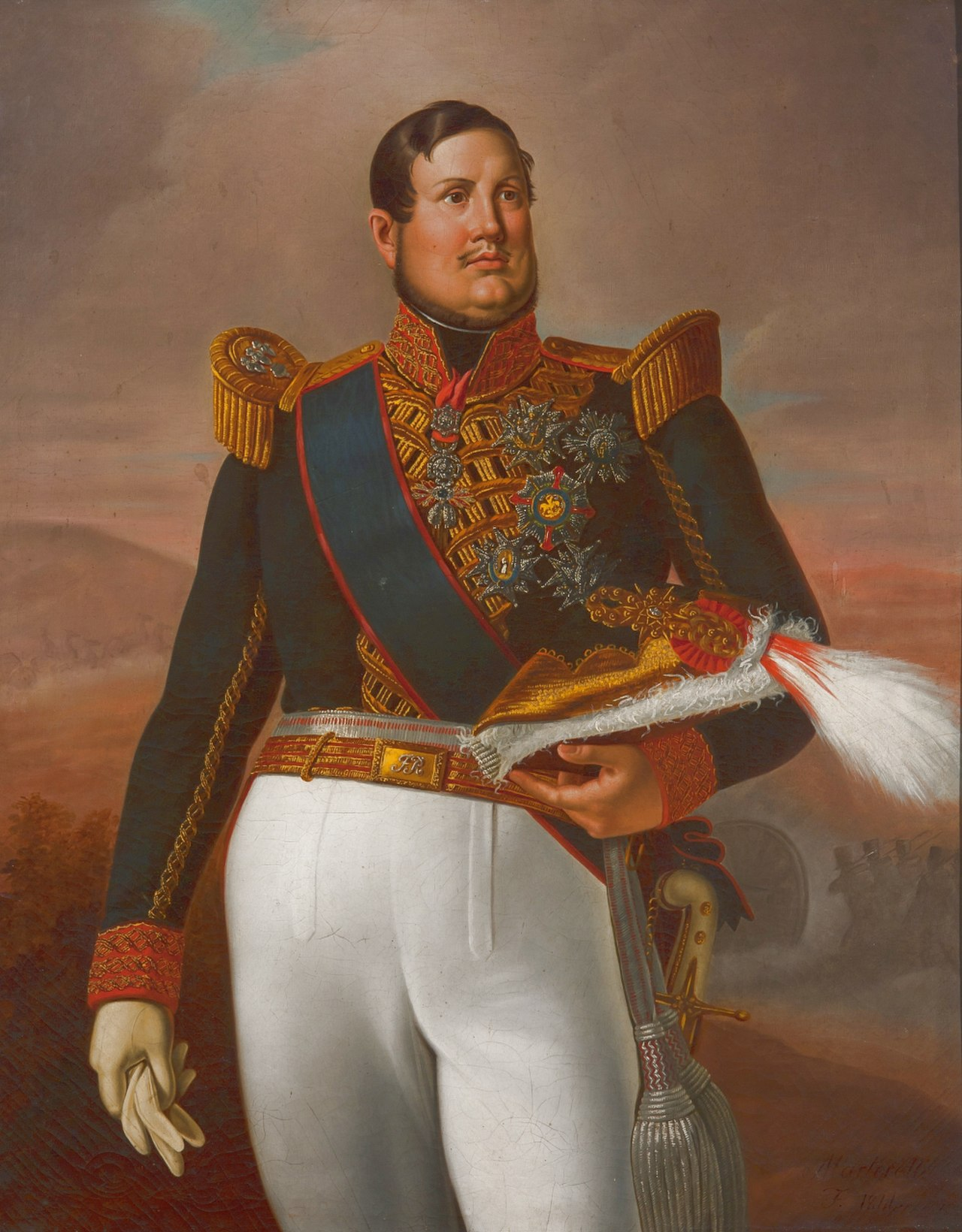
Ferdinand II of the Two Sicilies

Mercadante first suggested Virginia as the subject of an opera to La Fenice in 1839, but the idea was rejected. After the triumphant success of his 1846 opera Orazi e Curiazi in Naples, Mercadante was invited to tour the Austrian territories of Venice, Triest, and Milan conducting performances of his own works. He left Naples to begin the tour in August 1847, and, after a success in Milan, was asked by La Scala to compose a new work, La schiava saracena ("The Saracen slave"). That opera was supposed to premiere in January 1848, but a major revolutionary disturbance beginning on the 5th of that month postponed the opera's premiere and cut short Mercadante's tour.

Mercadante returned to Naples in March 1848 in the aftermath of revolutionary activity in that city, Salerno, and the Cilento region which had forced Ferdinand II of the Two Sicilies to grant a constitution patterned on the French Charter of 1830 on January 29, 1848. A dispute, however, arose as to the nature of the oath which should be taken by the members of the chamber of deputies. As an agreement could not be reached and the King refused to compromise, riots continued in the streets. Eventually, the King ordered the army to break them up and dissolved the national parliament on March 13, 1849. Although the constitution was never formally abrogated, the King returned to reigning as an absolute monarch.

Deploring the pattern of events in his country, Mercadante selected Alfieri's Virginia as a means of expressing his criticism of the constitution's suppression. Alfieri's story, set in Ancient Rome, tells the tale of a plebeian revolt, spurred on by the tragic murder of the title heroine by her father, which leads to the founding of the Roman Republic tribunes and the Plebeian Council. Mercadante asked Cammarano, with whom he frequently collaborated, to write the opera's libretto. Cammarano obliged, giving Mercadante a finished libretto in late 1849. Mercadante began composing the opera in December 1849, completing it in March 1850.

Virginia was scheduled to première at the Teatro di San Carlo in March 1850. However, King Ferdinand II got word of the production and issued a ban on the opera's performance, even though Cammarano’s libretto carefully avoided any possible negative political implications. The censorship of the opera drew wide scorn for Ferdinand throughout Europe. In an attempt to appease the outcry, the Italian state offered a compromise, allowing the opera to be set in Egypt and not Italy. Mercadante refused to comply. In the place of Virginia, the premiere of Mercadante's Medea occurred in Naples on 1 March 1851.

In 1852, most likely out of an attempt at improving the state's public image, Ferdinand appointed Mercadante as inspector of the royal military bands, a post which led to the commissioning of several compositions for these musical groups (Fantasia sull’inno russo; Fantasia sull’inno borbonico; etc.) However, Ferdinand never lifted the ban on the opera, and neither did his successor Francis II.

In 1861 the Kingdom of the Two Sicilies was conquered by the Expedition of the Thousand under Giuseppe Garibaldi. Garibaldi served the Kingdom of Sardinia which was in the process of Italian unification. While members of the deposed Royal House survived, they no longer carried any power, freeing Mercadante to present his opera. The work was finally premiered in Naples on 7 April 1866. The premiere night performance of the work proved to be problematic, but the second performance of the opera was triumphantly received.

== Performance history ==
Although reactions to Mercadante's opera were positive, the work failed to gain a significant place in the performance repertory. Subsequent productions were mounted in Rome (1872), Turin (1877) and again in Naples (1901), but otherwise the opera remained largely ignored.

After a 75-year absence, Virginia was revived for its United Kingdom premiere on November 27, 1976 in Whitla Hall at the Queen's University Festival in Belfast, Northern Ireland. The notable cast included Janet Price as Virginia, Christian du Plessis as Virginio, Bonaventura Bottone as Appio, Maurice Arthur as Icilio, and the Chorus of the Northern Ireland Opera Trust. James Judd conducted the Ulster Orchestra. An unauthorized recording was made, copies of which are part of the collections of a number of libraries, including the Chicago Public Library.

On the heels of the UK premiere was a scheduled American premiere of the work by the Opera Orchestra of New York. Montserrat Caballé began to prepare the title role in 1977 for the anticipated premiere at Carnegie Hall in New York City on 29 March 1978. However, Caballé became ill just prior to the performance, and the production was cancelled, never to be rescheduled. Since the 1976 UK production, Virginia was not revived until 2010 when it was mounted by the Wexford Festival Opera with soprano Angela Meade in the title role. In 2009 Opera Rara released the first commercial recording of the work.

== Roles ==
Role	Voice type	Premiere Cast, 7 April 1866 (Conductor: - Nicola De Giosa)
Virginia	soprano	Marcella Lotti della Santa
Appio Claudio, a powerful Roman patrician	tenor	Filippo Morelli-Ponti
Virginio, Virginia's father	bass	Marco Arati
Icilio, Virginia's boyfriend	tenor	Raffaele Mirate
Marco, Appio's associate	baritone	Giorgio Stigelli
Tullia, Virginia's nurse	soprano	Adelaide Morelli
Valerio, Virginia's cousin	tenor	Michele Memmi

== Synopsis ==
Place: Ancient Rome

Virginia, a plebeian, is the virgin daughter of Virginio, a Roman soldier. She and Icilio, a patrician, are in love and wish to marry. However Appio Claudio has declared that patricians and plebeians can not marry one another, a fact which makes their marriage impossible. At the same time Appio notices Virginia's beauty, and desiring her, attempts to force himself on her. Iclio intervenes, and stops him. Then, Virginio comes to her aid, reminding Appio of Virginia's protection under Roman law as the daughter of a Roman citizen. Thwarted, Appio plots to get Virginia through legal trickery, claiming that she is not Virginio's daughter but in fact a slave belonging to his associate Marco. The case is brought before a public tribunal and it appears that Appio will have his way. To further discourage Virginia, Appio has Icilio killed, but rather than be forced to be with Appio, Virginia stabs herself to death. Her act of tragic bravery inspires a massive insurrection of plebeians against Appio and the patrician regime.

== Recordings ==
Year	Cast (Virginia, Appio, Virginio, Icilio, Marco)	Conductor, Opera House and Orchestra	Label
1976	Janet Price, Bonaventura Bottone, Christian du Plessis, Maurice Arthur, John Tomlinson	James Judd, Belfast Orchestra and Chorus (Recording of a performance in Belfast, 27 November)	Audio CD: Premiere Opera Ltd. CDNO 2651-2
2007	Susan Patterson, Paul Charles Clarke, Stefano Antonucci, Charles Castronovo, Andrew Foster-Williams	Maurizio Benini, London Philharmonic Orchestra and the Geoffrey Mitchell Choir (studio recording)	Audio CD: Opera Rara, Cat: ORC 39
