= Marco Arati =

Italian opera singer

Marco Arati (181? - 1899) was an Italian operatic bass active during the 1840s through the 1880s. Although he occasionally appeared at other opera houses in Italy, he was primarily committed to the Teatro di San Carlo where he sang roles for more than four decades. Even though he was one of the preeminent singers of his day, there is little known about his life.

== Biography ==
The exact place and date of Arati's birth is unknown, although it is likely that he was born somewhere between 1814 and 1819. He made his professional opera debut at the Teatro di San Carlo in 1841 in a production of Teodulo Mabellini's Rolla. He sang in numerous world premieres at the Teatro di San Carlo during his career, most notably the roles of Andrea Cornaro in Gaetano Donizetti's Caterina Cornaro (1844), Alvaro in Giuseppe Verdi's Alzira (1845), Old Orazio in Saverio Mercadante's Orazi e Curiazi (1846), Callistene in Donizetti's Poliuto (1848), Wurm in Verdi's Luisa Miller (1849), Marco in Mercadante's Virginia (1866), and Filippo Augusto in Donizetti's Gabriella di Vergy (1869). His last known opera appearance was at the Teatro di San Carlo in 1882 as Indra in Jules Massenet's Le roi de Lahore. He died in 1899.

== World premieres ==
- Alessandro Curmi's Elodia di Herstall (1842),
- Pietro Torregiani's Ulrico di Oxford (1842)
- Giuseppe Lillo's Lara (1842)
- Giovanni Pacini's La fidanzata corsa (Guido Tobianchi, 1842)
- Gaetano Donizetti's Caterina Cornaro (Andrea Cornaro, 1844)
- Vincenzo Maria Battista's Margherita d'Aragona (Michele, 1844)
- Salvatore Sarmiento's Costanza d'Aragona (1844)
- Giuseppe Verdi's Alzira (Alvaro, 1845)
- Vincenzo Capecelatro's Mortedo (1845)
- Giovanni Pacini's Stella di Napoli (Aubigni, 1845)
- Pietro Torregiani's La sirena di Normandia (1846)
- Vincenzo Maria Battista's Emo (1846)
- Saverio Mercadante's Orazi e Curiazi (Old Orazio, 1846)
- Vincenzo Maria Battista's Eleonora Dori (1847)
- Vincenzo Maria Battista's Irene (1847)
- Giovanni Pacini's Merope (Trasimede/Anassimandro, 1847)
- Gaetano Donizetti's Poliuto (Callistene, 1848)
- Giuseppe Verdi's Luisa Miller (Wurm, 1849)
- Giuseppe Puzone's Elfrida di Salerno (1849)
- Saverio Mercadante's Medea (Creonte, 1851)
- Giovanni Pacini's Malvina di Scozia (1851)
- Errico Petrella's Elena di Tolosa (1852)
- Giuseppe Staffa's Alceste (Stratone/Talenio, 1852)
- Nicola De Giosa's Guido Colmar (1852)
- Vincenzo Maria Battista's Mudarra (1852)
- Saverio Mercadante's Statira (Erma-Sommo, 1853)
- Giovanni Pacini's Romilda di Provenza (1853)
- Errico Petrella's Marco Visconti (Oldrado del Balzo, 1854)
- Antonio Gandolfo's Il sultano (1854)
- Nicola De Giosa's Ettore Fieramosca (1855)
- Giovanni Terranova's L'orfana di Lorena (1855)
- Ferdinando Tommasi's Guido e Ginevra (1855)
- Giovanni Pacini's Margherita Pusterla (1856)
- Saverio Mercadante's Pelagio (Asan, 1857)
- Salvatore Pappalardo's Mirinda (1860)
- Errico Petrella's Virginia (Virginio, 1861)
- Vincenzo Moscuzza's Don Carlos infante di Spagna (Filippo II, 1862)
- Enrico Bevignani's Caterina Blum (1862)
- Vincenzo Maria Battista's Giovanna di Castiglia (1863)
- Nicola De Giosa's Il bosco di Dafne (1864)
- Paolo Serrao's La duchessa di Guisa (1865)
- Saverio Mercadante's Virginia (Virginio, 1866)
- Giovanni Pacini's Berta di Varnol (1867)
- Paolo Serrao's Il figliuol prodigo (Ruben, 1868)
- Vincenzo Maria Battista's L'Alba d'Oro (1869)
- Gaetano Donizetti's Gabriella di Vergy (Filippo Augusto, 1869)
- Errico Petrella's Manfredo (1872)
- Ernesto Viceconte's Selvaggia (1872)
