= Gaetano Fraschini =

Italian tenor

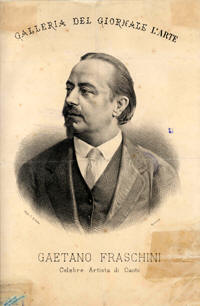
Portrait of Gaetano Fraschini

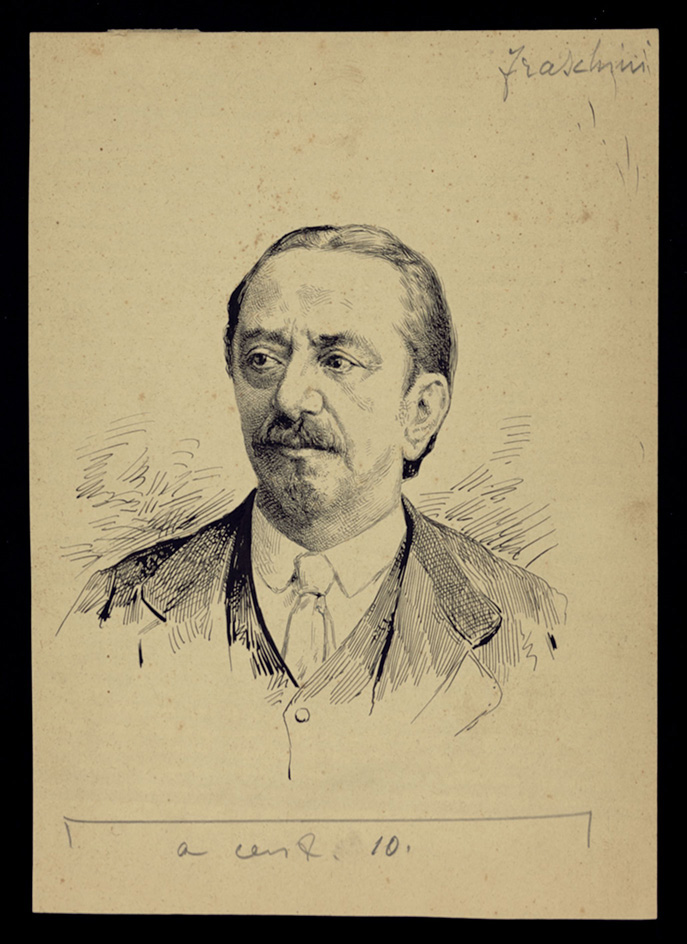
Portrait of Gaetano Fraschini

Gaetano Fraschini (16 February 1816 – 23 May 1887) was an Italian tenor. He created many roles in 19th century operas, including five composed by Giuseppe Verdi. His voice was "heroic ... with a baritonal quality, ... yet Verdi and Donizetti appreciated his ability to sing softly and with subtlety." An Italian biographer has pointed out Fraschini's role in extending the longevity of Donizetti's operas, while at the same time accelerating the ascent of Verdi's repertory. He was indeed the most prominent singer who facilitated the transition from Donizetti to Verdi. Fraschini sang over one hundred roles and Verdi placed him at the top of his favorite tenors' list and described him as a "natural Manrico" for his Il trovatore. Fraschini also played a pivotal role in the success of many operas by Pacini and Mercadante.

== Biography ==
Born in Pavia on 16 February 1816, the second son of Domenico Fraschini and Grazia Cremaschi, Fraschini studied with Felice Moretti before debuting in his home town on 4 April 1837, at the Teatro dei Nobili Cavalieri, now known as Teatro Fraschini, singing the role of Lord Arturo in Gaetano Donizetti's Lucia di Lammermoor. A month later, as a comprimario, he sang the role of Hervey in Donizetti's Anna Bolena in the same theatre. In the same house he sang Iago in Rossini's Otello next to the legendary Giovanni David in the title role, in April 1838. The following month, on the same stage he sang in Donizetti's L'Esule di Roma. Bergamo's Teatro della Società secured him for the same role. He continued singing Donizetti, performing in Torquato Tasso in Bergamo in January 1839.

He returned to his home-town to sing in Mercadante's Gabriella di Vergy, also in Donizetti's Gemma di Vergy and Fausta. From July to September he was in Vicenza, where he sang in Mercadante's Elena da Feltre, Donizetti's Torquato Tasso and Roberto Devereux. To crown it all he sang Pollione in Bellini's Norma with Giuseppina Ronzi de Begnis (his future mother-in-law) in the title role. In October he made his Venetian debut at the Teatro San Benedetto as Pollione and Roberto Devereux; the primadonna assoluta was Ronzi de Begnis.

On 28 March 1840 he made his debut at La Scala in Marino Faliero. Although his voice was excellent, his acting abilities left something to be desired and generated a few isolated boos. These were magnified by a review and hurt Fraschini so much that he vowed never to sing again at La Scala.

Beginning in that year he was engaged at the Teatro San Carlo in Naples, where he remained continually until 1853. There he created roles in numerous operas by Giovanni Pacini, including La fidanzata corsa, La stella di Napoli, La regina di Cipro, Merope and Romilda di Provenza, and Faone in Saffo; he also created Gerardo in Caterina Cornaro for Donizetti in 1844. He sang in other Donizetti operas, too, including Linda di Chamounix, Maria di Rohan, La favorite, Poliuto, and Lucia di Lammermoor. The force with which he delivered Edgardo's curse in the latter led to his nickname, "tenore della maledizione". This role became a true war-horse for Fraschini. Apart from the already mentioned Norma, other Bellinian operas sung by him included Il Pirata, and Beatrice di Tenda.

An early tenore di forza, he created several Verdian roles, beginning with Zamoro in Alzira in 1845. He was also the first Corrado in Il corsaro (1848), Arrigo in La battaglia di Legnano (1849), the title role in Stiffelio (1850), and Riccardo in Un ballo in maschera (1859). He also sang in Oberto, Ernani, I Lombardi, I masnadieri, Luisa Miller, and Il trovatore. 1856 saw him singing Henri in Les vêpres siciliennes in Rome, and in 1858 he was Gabriele Adorno in Simon Boccanegra for Naples.

In 1846 he made his international debut at the Kärtnerthortheater in Vienna, where he sang Chalais in Donizetti's Maria di Rohan, followed by Verdi's Ernani and Donizetti's Lucia di Lammermoor and Don Pasquale. Internationally, too, he sang a good deal of Verdi: at Her Majesty's Theatre in 1847 where he took part in the first London performance of I due Foscari; in 1863 at Madrid, where he sang in La forza del destino; and the following autumn at the Théâtre Italien in Paris, where he appeared in Un Ballo in Maschera, Ernani, and Il Trovatore, as well as in Lucia di Lammermoor and Poliuto.

Monaldi described Fraschini's voice as like "a silver gong struck with a silver hammer". He probably was echoing the famous voice teacher Henry Panofka who — in his treatise on "Singers and Voices" — exhorted young tenors to emulate Fraschini and pointed out the "silvery" quality of his voice.

Fraschini retired in 1873, bidding his farewell in Rome as Gennaro in Lucrezia Borgia and in Florence as Don Alvaro in La forza del destino. His last role was Lyonel in Flotow's Martha, which he sang at Teatro della Pergola in Florence in January 1874. At the time "his voice and technique were still intact". Fraschini died in Naples in 1887. The opera house in Pavia is named for him.

== Sources ==
- Casaglia, Gherardo (2005)."Gaetano Fraschini". L'Almanacco di Gherardo Casaglia (in Italian).
- "Gaetano Fraschini". Grove Music Online (8th ed.). Oxford University Press. 2001. doi:10.1093/gmo/9781561592630.article.10168. ISBN 978-1-56159-263-0.
- Warrack, John; West, Ewan (1992). The Oxford Dictionary of Opera. Oxford: Oxford University Press. ISBN 978-0-19-869164-8.
- Migliavacca, Giorgio. "Gaetano Fraschini: il tenore della transizione da Donizetti a Verdi" in Moderne Sprachen 44, Vienna 2000, pp. 207–232. ISSN 0026-8666
