= Orazi e Curiazi =

Opera by Saverio Mercadante

Saverio Mercadante

Orazi e Curiazi (The Horatii and the Curiatii) is an opera by the Italian composer Saverio Mercadante. It takes the form of a tragedia lirica in three acts. The libretto, by Salvadore Cammarano, is based on the Roman legend of the fight between Horatii and Curiatii. It was first performed at the Teatro San Carlo, Naples, on 10 November 1846.

== Roles ==
Roles, voice types, premiere cast
Role	Voice type	Premiere cast, 10 November 1846 Conductor: Antonio Farelli
Orazio	baritone	Pietro Balzar
Curiazio	tenor	Gaetano Fraschini
Old Orazio	bass	Marco Arati
Old Curiazio	tenor	Capranica Jr.
Camilla	soprano	Erminia Frezzolini
Sabina	mezzo-soprano	Anna Salvetti
High Priest	tenor	Teofilo Rossi

== Recordings ==
Year	Cast: Orazio, Camilla, Curiazio, Old Orazio	Conductor, opera house and orchestra	Label
1975	Christian du Plessis, Janet Price, Richard Greager, Malcolm King	Kenneth Montgomery, Bournemouth Sinfonietta Orchestra and Choir (Recording of a concert performance given by Opera Rara in the Queen Elizabeth Hall, 27 April)	3 LPs: Unique Opera Records Corporation; Cat: UORC 250
1993	Nelly Miricioiu, Anthony Michaels-Moore, Marcus Haddock, Alastair Miles	David Parry, Philharmonia Orchestra and the Mitchell Choir	CD: Opera Rara; ORC 12
