= Kenneth Montgomery =

British conductor (1943–2023)

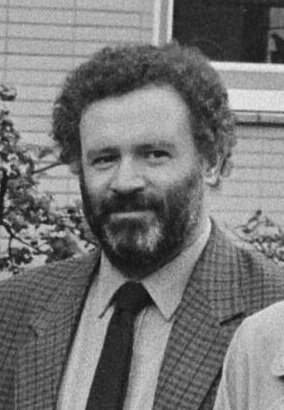
Kenneth Montgomery (1984)

Kenneth Montgomery OBE (28 October 1943 – 5 March 2023) was a British conductor active in the concert hall and opera house. He held music director positions in the UK, the Netherlands and the US.

== Life and career ==
The only child of Lily and Tom Montgomery, his upbringing was in Wandsworth Parade, Belfast, and he attended the Royal Belfast Academical Institution. His musical studies were at the Royal College of Music. He studied with Sir Adrian Boult, and later continued to study conducting with Hans Schmidt-Isserstedt in Hamburg, Sergiu Celibidache in Siena (1965–67), and Sir John Pritchard. His professional debut was conducting L'Elisir d'Amore for Glyndebourne Festival Opera, where he was staff conductor, assistant choral conductor and rehearsal pianist. He later served on the conducting staff at Sadler's Wells Opera, making his debut there in 1967 with Così fan tutte; he conducted the new production of Patience in 1969, eliciting “exemplary orchestral playing”. His debut with Netherlands Opera was for L'Ormindo in 1970. At Wexford he conducted Il re pastore in 1971, Oberon in 1972 and a rare revival of Donizetti's L'ajo nell'imbarazzo in 1973. He conducted the UK premieres by Opera Rara of Donizetti's Maria Padilla in April 1973, and of Mercadante's Orazi e Curiazi in April 1975 conducting the Bournemouth Sinfonietta, as well as Torquato Tasso at the Camden Festival in 1974.

From 1970 to 1973 Montgomery was assistant conductor for the Bournemouth Symphony Orchestra and Bournemouth Sinfonietta, becoming music director of the latter in 1973. He was music director of Glyndebourne Touring Opera from 1975 to 1976, and continued with the ensemble as a guest conductor. In 1985, he became both artistic and musical director of Opera Northern Ireland, where his repertoire included Die Entführung aus dem Serail, The Marriage of Figaro, Così fan tutte, The Magic Flute, Faust and La bohème. With the Ulster Orchestra, Montgomery served as its principal guest conductor, and became principal conductor in September 2007, the first Belfast-born musician to be named in this role, continuing until 2010.

Outside of the UK, in 1975, Montgomery was named principal conductor of the Dutch Radio Symphony Orchestra, and from 1985 to 1989 held the same post with the orchestra under its newer name of the Netherlands Radio Symphony. Later, he was appointed the director of the Dutch Radio Choir (Groot Omroepkoor). In 1991, he became director of opera studies at the Royal Conservatory in The Hague. He continued to make his home in the Netherlands, where he died in 2023. His debut at the Paris opera was Iphigénie en Tauride in 1985.

From 1982, Montgomery was a regular guest conductor at Santa Fe Opera (SFO), and in May 2007, he was named its interim music director, succeeding Alan Gilbert. Montgomery's tenure as interim music director concluded after the 2007 season, and in April 2013, he was named SFO conductor laureate for the 2013 season. For San Diego Opera he led performances of The Passion of Jonathan Wade in 1991, his debut there, and among other operas, Cendrillon in 2006 and Alceste (Paris version) in 2009.

His conducting of Orfeo ed Euridice for Scottish Opera in 2015 with a production by dancer and choreographer Ashley Page was praised for their "sophisticated simplicity", the reviewer continuing "Montgomery’s experience told: he got the best out of the orchestra — and out of the music, too, partly by letting the textures breathe but also by refusing to hurry it". He conducted Idomeneo in the Netherlands, projecting "the throb and thrust of this impulsive score, but also its tragic timelessness, with total mastery" and in the UK, where the reviewer praised his "vitally theatrical conducting [which] recalled Glyndebourne in the Pritchard years", and mused why Montgomery "this deeply musical British conductor" was so little heard in the UK.

Montgomery was appointed Officer of the Order of the British Empire (OBE) in the 2010 New Year Honours. He died in Amsterdam on 5 March 2023, at the age of 79.

== Discography ==
Montgomery's discography includes Arne symphonies (Bournemouth Sinfonietta), J.C. Bach symphonies (Bournemouth Sinfonietta), Ed de Boer's Symphony No. 1 (Radio Filharmonisch Orkest Hilversum), Grainger Folk-Settings (Moray Welsh, Bournemouth Sinfonietta), Keiser's Brockes Passion (Netherlands Radio Chamber Orchestra and Choir), Hans Kox's War Tryptich (Netherlands Radio Philharmonic and Choir), Martin's Cello Concerto, Trois Dances for Oboe and Harp, Ballade for Cello and Chamber Orchestra and Passacaille for Strings (Netherlands Radio Chamber Orchestra), Stanford's Piano Concerto No. 2 and Variations on 'Down among the Dead Men' (Finghin Collins and the RTÉ National Symphony Orchestra), a Mozart aria recital with Sumi Jo (English Chamber Orchestra), a French opera airs recital with Laurence Dale (Orchestre symphonique et lyrique de Nancy), popular works by Handel (Bournemouth Sinfonietta), and Nordic and Slav music for string orchestra (Bournemouth Sinfonietta).

Cultural offices
Preceded by Myer Fredman	Music Director, Glyndebourne Touring Opera; 1975–1976	Succeeded by Nicholas Braithwaite
Preceded by (no predecessor)	Chief Conductor, Netherlands Radio Symphony; 1985–1989	Succeeded by Henry Lewis
Preceded by Alan Gilbert	Interim Music Director, Santa Fe Opera; 2007	Succeeded by Edo de Waart (chief conductor)
Preceded by Thierry Fischer	Principal Conductor, Ulster Orchestra; 2007–2010	Succeeded by JoAnn Falletta
