= Caterina Cornaro (opera) =

Opera by Gaetano Donizetti

- Opera by Gaetano Donizetti
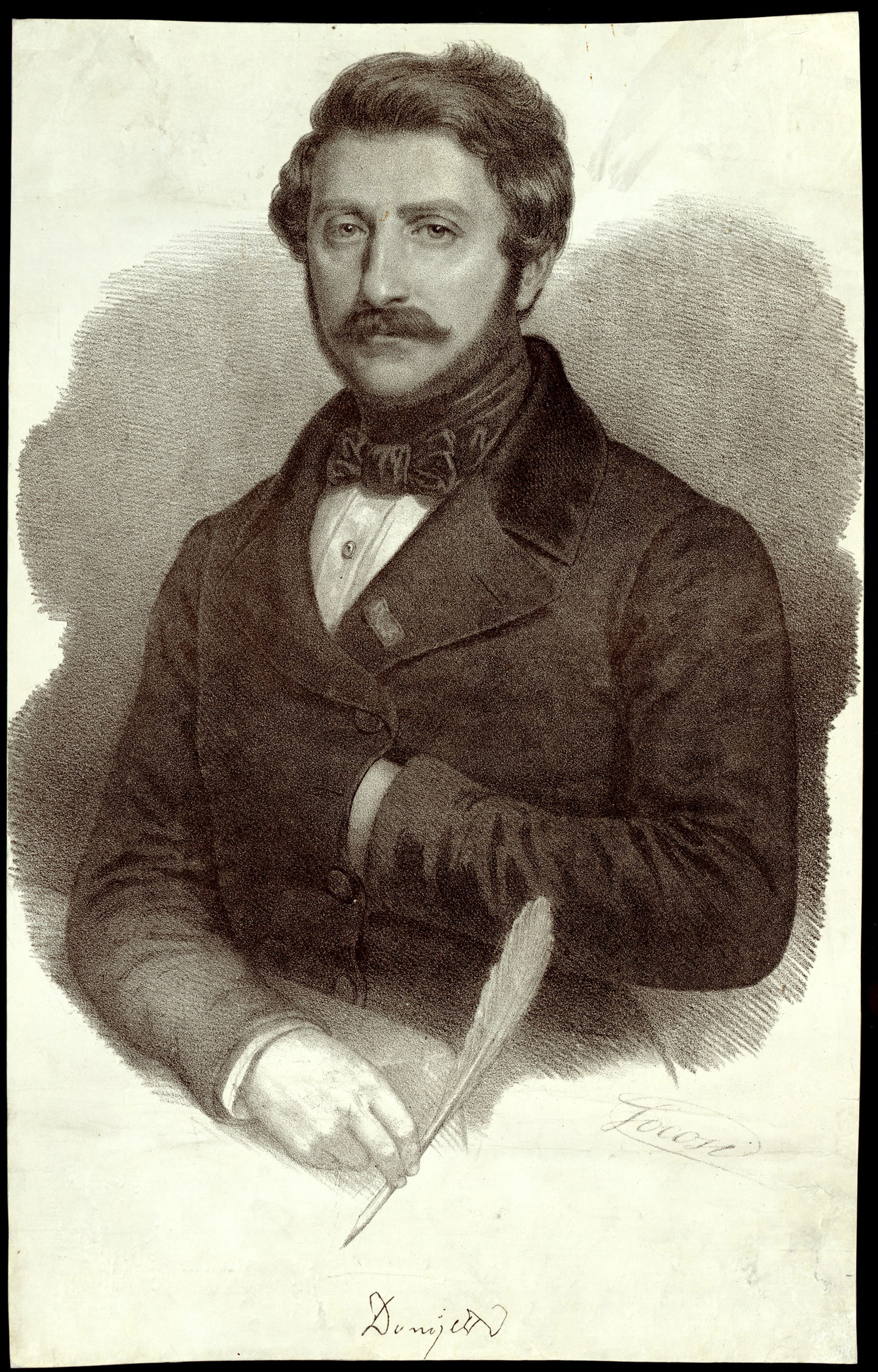
- Gaetano Donizetti, lithography by Roberto Focosi
- Librettist: Giacomo Sacchero
- Language: Italian
- Based on: Life of Caterina Cornaro
- Premiere: 12 January 1844; Teatro San Carlo, Naples

Caterina Cornaro ossia La Regina di Cipro (Caterina Cornaro or The Queen of Cyprus) is a tragedia lirica, or opera, in a prologue and two acts by Gaetano Donizetti. Giacomo Sacchero wrote the Italian libretto after Jules-Henri Vernoy de Saint-Georges' libretto for Halévy's La reine de Chypre (1841). It is based on the life of Caterina Cornaro (1454 - 1510), Queen of Cyprus from 1474 to 1489. It premiered at the Teatro San Carlo, Naples on 12 January 1844.

== Composition history ==
Following the success of Linda di Chamounix, Caterina Cornaro was commissioned by Bartolomeo Merelli, impresario of the Kaertnerthortheater in Vienna, and was partly composed in 1842, just before Don Pasquale, and completed during the following summer. The Viennese realised that the same subject had been set to music the preceding year by Franz Lachner and the debut was cancelled. Donizetti dedicated himself instead to Maria di Rohan, presented at the Theater am Kärntnertor in June 1843, and searched for a suitable theatre for Caterina. Two months after the triumph of Dom Sébastien in Paris, Caterina was booed at the San Carlo in Naples. The composer, who had been unable to be present at rehearsals or to oversee the orchestration, had clearly predicted the opera's failure, in a January 1844 communication to his brother-in-law:

I am anxiously awaiting news of the fiasco of Caterina Cornaro in Naples. La Goldberg as a primadonna is my first disaster without knowing it. I wrote for a soprano, they give me a mezzo! God knows if Coletti, if Fraschini intend their roles as I intend them. God knows what a catastrophe censorship has brought.

In the winter of 1844–45, Donizetti devoted himself to a revision which provided a different ending. The new version was presented in Parma in February 1845, with Marianna Barbieri-Nini in the title role. It was the last of Donizetti's operas to have its première during his lifetime.

== Performance history ==
A contemporary revival took place at the Teatro San Carlo, Naples in 1972, with Leyla Gencer, Renato Bruson and Giacomo Aragall. Gencer sang a concert version the following year at Carnegie Hall, New York. In the same year, Montserrat Caballé sang Caterina in Paris at the Salle Pleyel and followed it with concert performances in London, Barcelona and Nice, some of which have been preserved on record.

Winton Dean has noted how the tenor role in Caterina Cornaro is marginalized compared to the conventions of Italian opera of the day. Dean also commented on the particularly menacing quality of the assassins' chorus in the opera.

== Roles ==
Role	Voice type	Premiere Cast, 12 January 1844 (Conductor: Antonio Farelli)
Caterina Cornaro	soprano	Fanny Goldberg
Matilde, Caterina's friend	mezzo-soprano	Anna Salvetti
Gerardo	tenor	Gaetano Fraschini
Lusignano, King of Cyprus	baritone	Filippo Coletti
Mocenigo, ambassador of Venice	bass	Nicola Benevento
Andrea Cornaro, Caterina's father	bass	Marco Arati
Strozzi, head of the Sgherri	tenor	Anafesto Rossi
A knight of the King	tenor	Domenico Ceci

== Synopsis ==
Place: Venice and Cyprus
Time: 1472

The wedding of Caterina, daughter of Andrea Cornaro, to a young Frenchman, Gerardo, is postponed when Mocenigo brings word that Lusignano, King of Cyprus, wishes to marry her. After much intrigue, involving Lusignano being slowly poisoned by Mocenigo, Gerardo joins the Knights of the Cross to help Lusignano defend Cyprus against the Venetians. Lusignano is mortally wounded; as he dies he entrusts his people to Caterina's care. Gerardo then returns to Rhodes. (In the revised finale for the Parma production, Lusignano informs Caterina that Gerardo has been killed in battle.)

== Recordings ==
Year	Cast (Caterina Cornaro, Gerardo, Lusignano, Andrea Cornaro)	Conductor, Opera House and Orchestra	Label
1972	Leyla Gencer, Giacomo Aragall, Renato Bruson, Luigi Risani	Carlo Felice Cillario, Orchestra and Chorus of the Teatro San Carlo (Recording of a performance at The Teatro San Carlo, Naples, 28 May)	Audio CD: Myto; Cat: MCD 921.53
1972	Montserrat Caballé, José Carreras, Lorenzo Saccomani, Enrique Serra	Carlo Felice Cillario, London Symphony Orchestra and Chorus (Recording of a concert performance at The Royal Festival Hall, 10 July)	Audio CD: Opera d'Oro; Cat: OPD-1266
1973	Leyla Gencer, Giuseppe Campora, Giuseppe Taddei, Samuel Ramey	Alfredo Silipigni, Orchestra and Chorus of the New Jersey Opera (Recording of a concert performance at Carnegie Hall, New York, 15 April)	Audio CD: On Stage; Cat: 4701
1973	Margherita Rinaldi, Ottavio Garaventa, Licinio Montefusco, Guido Mazzini	Elio Boncompagni, Orchestra and Chorus of RAI Turin (Recorded RAI studios, Turin, 30 August)	Audio CD: Bongiovanni; Cat: BG 2410/11-2
1973	Montserrat Caballé, Giacomo Aragall, Ryan Edwards, Claude Méloni	Gian-Franco Masini, Orchestre Lyrique & Chorale Lyrique de l'O.R.T.F. (Recording of a concert performance, Paris, Salle Pleyel, 25 November)	Audio CD: Rodophe, Cat: RPC 32474–32475; Phoenix, Cat: PX 505.2
1995	Denia Mazzola, Pietro Ballo, Stefano Antonucci, Marzio Giossi	Gianandrea Gavazzeni, "I Pomeriggi Musicali" di Milano and Teatro Donizetti di Bergamo Chorus (Recording of a performance in the Teatro Donizetti di Bergamo, 21 Sept)	Audio CD: Agora Musica; Cat: AG 046.2
1998	Julia Migenes, Alan Oke, Jeffrey Carl, Glenville Hargreaves	Richard Bonynge, British Youth Opera Orchestra and the Vasari Singers (Recording of a concert performance, Queen Elizabeth Hall, London, 28 June)	Audio CD: Hellenic Centre; Cat: 001/002
2013	Carmen Giannattasio, Colin Lee, Troy Cook, Graeme Broadbent	David Parry, BBC Singers and the BBC Symphony Orchestra (studio recording, BBC Maida Vale studios, London. Recorded 2011. Released 2013)	Audio CD: Opera Rara; Cat: ORC 48
