= Maria Padilla =

Opera by Gaetano Donizetti

- Opera by Gaetano Donizetti
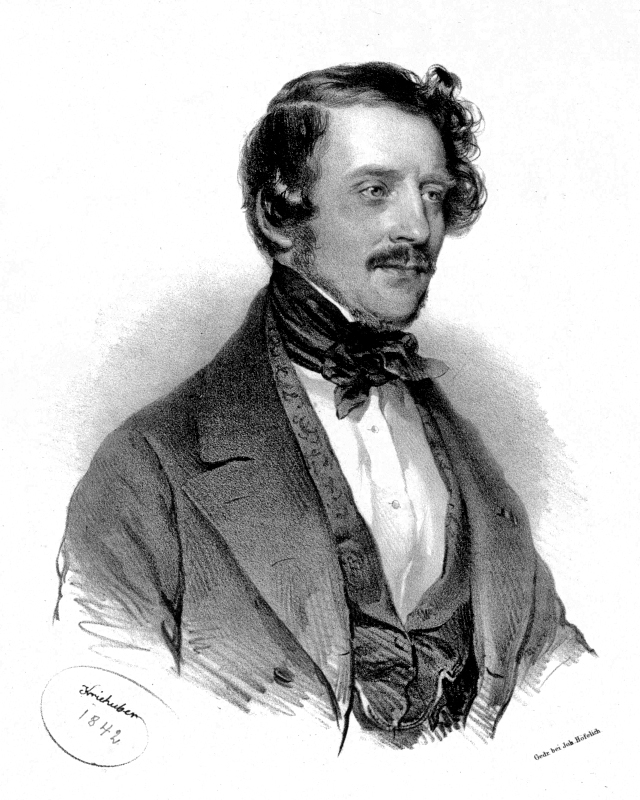
- Gaetano Donizetti, portrayed by Joseph Kriehuber in 1842
- Librettist: Gaetano Rossi; Donizetti
- Language: Italian
- Based on: François Ancelot's play Maria Padilla
- Premiere: 26 December 1841; La Scala, Milan

Maria Padilla is a melodramma, or opera, in three acts by Gaetano Donizetti. Gaetano Rossi and the composer wrote the Italian libretto after François Ancelot's play. It premiered on 26 December 1841 at La Scala, Milan. The plot is loosely based on the historical figure María de Padilla, the mistress of Pedro the Cruel, King of Castile.

== Performance history ==
The first 20th century performance, and UK premiere, took place at the Queen Elizabeth Hall on 8 April 1973 by Opera Rara with Janet Price in the lead role, Margreta Elkins, Christian du Plessis and Gunnar Drago, with the Bournemouth Sinfonietta conducted by Kenneth Montgomery. The American premiere took place in Stony Brook on 23 April 1983 by the Long Island Opera Society (an uncut concert performance of the Naples version) with Marilyn Brustadt in the title role, conducted by David Lawton. In 1990 Renée Fleming made her major debut in the opera with Opera Omaha. Among other performances, the opera was presented at Dorset Opera in Sherborne in 1988, by the Buxton Festival in 2003 and by the Minnesota Opera in 2005.

== Roles ==
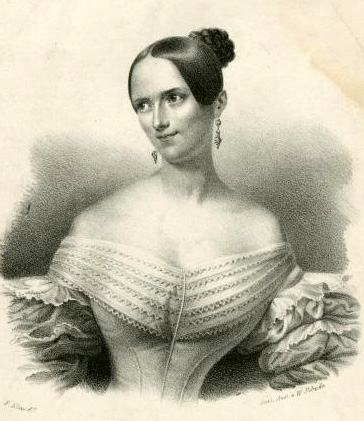
Sophie Löwe, who created the role of Maria Padilla

Roles, voice types, premiere cast
Role	Voice type	Premiere cast, 26 December 1841 Conductor: Eugenio Cavallini
Donna Maria Padilla, Ruiz' daughter	soprano	Sophie Löwe
Donna Ines Padilla, Ruiz' daughter	mezzo-soprano	Luigia Abbadia
Don Pedro, prince of Castile	baritone	Giorgio Ronconi
Don Ruiz di Padilla	tenor	Domenico Donzelli
Don Ramiro, duke of Albuquerque	bass	Gaetano Rossi
Francisca	mezzo-soprano	Teresa Ruggeri
Don Luigi, count of Aguillar	tenor	Ranieri Pochini
Don Alfonso di Pardo	bass	Agostino Berini
Bianca di Francia	silent	
Gentlemen, Castilian and French dignitaries, hunters, vassals of Padilla, guards, Castilian and French pages

== Synopsis ==
Place: Castile
Time: 14th century

Maria tells her sister Ines that she hopes to marry Don Pedro, the ruler of Castile. When he sneaks into her room disguised as Mendez, Maria tells him that she knows his true identity and demands marriage to save her honour. Don Pedro acquiesces, although the marriage must be kept secret. After their elopement, a faction of the Don Pedro's court wants him marry Bianca, a Bourbon princess, in order to avoid a civil war. He appears to be negotiating this, despite his secret marriage to Maria.

Meanwhile, Maria's father, Don Ruiz di Padilla, appears at the court. Believing that she is merely Don Pedro's mistress, he challenges the prince to a duel, but is led away in disgrace. Maria visits her father and tries to explain that she is the secret wife of Don Pedro, but her father refuses to listen.

Much to Maria's horror, Bianca arrives at the court, and is welcomed by Maria's enemies there as Don Pedro's bride and their queen. Instead, Don Pedro proclaims Maria as his queen and she dies of joy. (In the original ending which was changed by the censors, Maria grabbed the crown from Bianca's head and then committed suicide.)

== Recordings ==
Year	Cast: Maria, Ines, Ruiz, Pedro	Conductor, Company, orchestra, chorus	Label
1980	Lois McDonall, Della Jones, Graham Clark, Christian du Plessis	Alun Francis; London Symphony Orchestra and Geoffrey Mitchell Choir (recorded June 1980, Henry Wood Hall)	CD: Opera Rara; Cat: ORC6
1990	Renée Fleming, Stella Zambalis, Hans Gregory Ashbaker, Motti Kaston	John DeMain; Opera Omaha Orchestra and Chorus (Recording of a performance in the auditorium of the Joslyn Art Museum, Omaha, Nebraska, September)	CD: Premiere Opera; Cat: CDNO 8932
