= Andrew Foster-Williams =

English singer

Andrew Foster-Williams (born in Wigan, Greater Manchester) is an English operatic bass-baritone, concert singer and recitalist.

Andrew Foster-Williams read music at the Royal Academy of Music in London, graduating with a first-class honours degree. He has since been made a Fellow of the Royal Academy. He won many prizes whilst at the Royal Academy; including, amongst others, The Opera Prize, The Flora Nielsen Recital Prize and The Elena Gerhardt Lieder Prize.

Opera appearances include Friedrich von Telramund in Lohengrin and Kurwenal in Tristan und Isolde at la Monnaie in Brussels, the Four Villains in Les Contes d'Hoffmann in Moscow, Gunther in Götterdämmerung, Lysiart in Weber's Euryanthe for Theater an der Wien, Golaud in Pelléas et Mélisande at the Bolshoi Theatre in Moscow and in Basel, Escamillo in Carmen for the Bregenz Festival, Albert in Werther for Washington National Opera, Hidarot in a Barrie Kosky production of Gluck's opera Armide for Netherlands Opera, and Don Pizarro in Fidelio for Theater an der Wien.

Concert appearances have included Beethoven's Cantata on the Death of Emperor Joseph II with the San Francisco Symphony Orchestra conducted by Michael Tilson Thomas, Verdi Requiem with Yannick Nézet-Séguin in Montreal, Mozart Requiem with the New York Philharmonic, Spohr's Die letzten Dinge and J. C. Bach's Lucia Silla in Salzburg with the Mozarteum Orchestra conducted by Ivor Bolton, Haydn's The Seasons with the London Symphony Orchestra conducted by Sir Colin Davis. He also performed song recitals in Venice and at the Wigmore Hall in London.

He has worked with some other of the world's greatest orchestras including The London Symphony Orchestra, The Cleveland Orchestra, The New York Philharmonic, The San Francisco Symphony Orchestra, The London Philharmonic Orchestra, The Deutsche Symphony Orchestra Berlin, and The Netherlands Philharmonic

The Daily Telegraph in London named him their "Newcomer of the Year" and said "Andrew Foster-Williams is an impressively intelligent artist... we should be hearing more of him." In 2009 he sang the role of Marco in the world premiere recording of Saverio Mercadante's Virginia with the London Philharmonic Orchestra for the Opera Rara label.
