= Teresa Ruggeri =

Italian operatic soprano

Teresa Ruggeri Ruggieri
- Occupation: Italian operatic soprano
- Years active: 1820s–1840s

Teresa Ruggeri (sometimes spelled Ruggieri) was an Italian operatic soprano who had an active career from the 1820s through the 1840s. In 1827 she portrayed the role of Zarele in the world premiere of Giovanni Pacini's Gli arabi nelle Gallie at La Scala in Milan. She performed in several more world premieres at that house, including Francisca in Gaetano Donizetti's Maria Padilla (1841), Anna in Giuseppe Verdi's Nabucco (1842), and Viclinda in Verdi's I Lombardi alla prima crociata (1843). Other roles she performed at La Scala included Baroness Aspasia in Gioachino Rossini's La pietra del paragone (1829), Giannetta in Donizetti's L'elisir d'amore (1835), Alisa in Donizetti's Lucia di Lammermoor (1839), The Marquise of Birkenfeld in La fille du régiment (1840), and Giovanna in Verdi's Ernani (1844) among others.

From 1830–1832 Ruggeri was committed to the Teatro Regio di Torino. While there she performed roles in the world premieres of Luigi Ricci's Annibale in Torino (1830, Adrane) and Saverio Mercadante's I normanni a Parigi (1832, Berta). Other roles she sang in Turin included Alaide in Vincenzo Bellini's La straniera (1831) and the title role in Mercadante's Gabriella di Vergy (1832). In 1835 she sang the role of Isabella in Giacomo Meyerbeer's Robert le diable at the Teatro della Canobbiana.
