= Pelagio (opera) =

1857 Italian-language opera by Saverio Mercadante

Saverio Mercadante

Pelagio is an opera (tragedia lirica) in four acts by Saverio Mercadante. The Italian-language libretto was by Marco D'Arienzo. It premiered on 12 February 1857 at the Teatro San Carlo, Naples, to great success.

The opera had further successful performances in Milan and Lisbon.

In modern times, Pelagio was performed in 2005 in Gijón, Spain, and in 2008 at the Festival della Valle d'Itria.

Pelagio is an opera with "roots in the bel canto tradition that shows the influence of Verdi", and the work has been described as rich in "excellent music", with "at least one aria (for Bianca in act 4) of an almost Verdian intensity and pathos".

== Roles ==
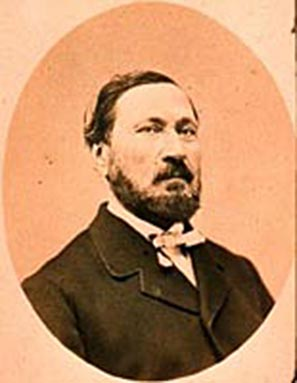
Filippo Coletti sang the role of Pelagio

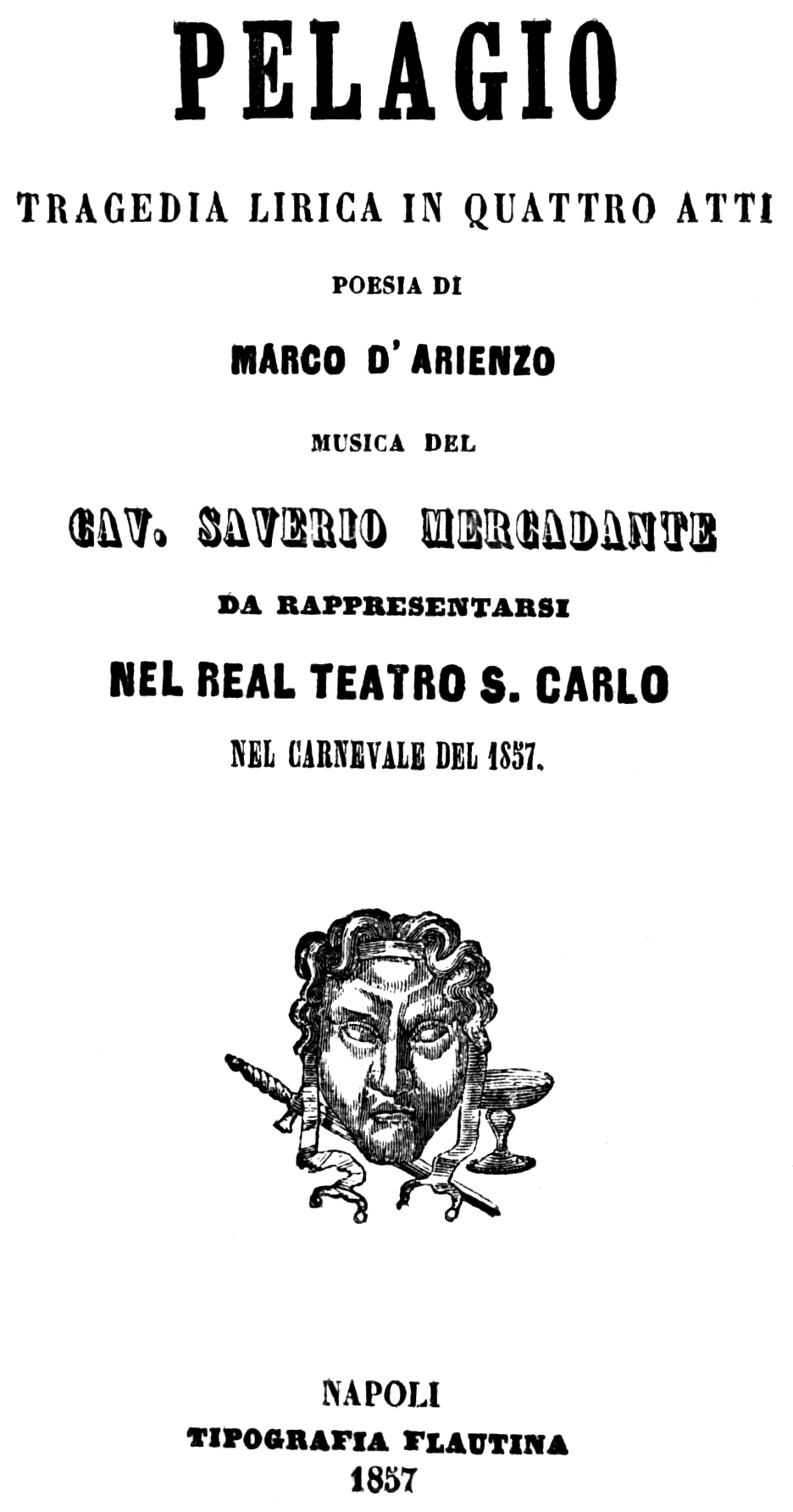
Cover page of the libretto for Pelagio

Roles, voice types, premiere cast
Role	Voice type	Premiere cast, 12 February 1857 Conductor: Antonio Farelli
Pelagius (Italian: Pelagio)	baritone	Filippo Coletti
Abdel-Aor, governor of Gijón	tenor	Lodovico Graziani
Bianca, daughter of Pelagius	soprano	Fortunata Tedesco
Giralda, Bianca's confidante	contralto	Schiavi
Asan, captain of the Moors	bass	Marco Arati
Aliatar, a guard in Abdel-Aor's apartments	bass	Nicola Monti
Mendo de Quexada, Spanish nobleman	bass	Michele Benedetti
An inhabitant of Gijón	tenor	A. Lauri
Arabian soldiers, Arabian men and maidens, Spanish warriors, Spanish men and maidens

== Synopsis ==
Place: Gijón and Asturias
Time: 8th century

The main character is the Asturian king who founded the Kingdom of Asturias and fought against the Moors. It is supposed that his daughter Bianca, brought up by Giralda because Pelagio was believed to be dead, falls in love with the Moor Abdel-Aor, governor of the city of Gijón. Bianca is thus cursed by Pelagius. The opera ends with the death of Bianca, killed by the same Abdel-Aor because he realizes that the love with Bianca has become impossible and is convinced that Bianca is betraying him to help her father.

== Recordings ==
2008: Mariano Rivas; Orchestra Internazionale d'Italia, Bratislava Chamber Choir
(Live recording at the Festival della Valle d'Itria); CD: Dynamic CDS 636/1-2

Pelagio: Costantino Finucci
Abdel-Aor: Danilo Formaggia
Bianca: Clara Polito
Giralda: Paola Francesca Natale

Asan: Vladimir Mebonia
Aliatar: Giovanni Coletta
Mendo de Quexada: Cristian Camilo Navarro Díaz
Inhabitant of Gijón: Vincenzo Maria Sarinelli
