= Janet Price =

Welsh soprano

Janet Price (born 5 February 1938) is a Welsh soprano particularly associated with the 19th-century Italian bel canto repertory.

Born in Pontypool, Wales, she studied piano and singing at Cardiff University with Olive Groves, Isobel Baillie and Hervey Alan. She also studied in Paris with Nadia Boulanger. She made her debut in 1964 with BBC Wales. In 1971, she appeared at London Town Hall in a concert performance of Haydn's La fedeltà premiata.

She then specialized in 19th-century Italian bel canto and French repertoire and began an association with Opera Rara, appearing in concert and staged performances of long neglected works by composers such as Meyerbeer, Mercadante, Donizetti, Auber, etc. She also appeared with the Handel Opera Society, Welsh National Opera, the Glyndebourne Festival, and Kent Opera.

She sang Fiordiligi in Così fan tutte at the Opéra-Comique in 1974, and also appeared at the Festival of Flanders and the San Antonio Grand Opera Festival, Texas.

She recorded Ugo, conte di Parigi with Opera Rara in 1977. She can also be heard on a few live recordings in operas like L'étoile du nord, Orazi e Curiazi, Virginia, La muette de Portici, Maria Padilla, and Torquato Tasso.

She has been married to composer Adrian Beaumont since 1963, and lives in Bristol.
