= Anafesto Rossi =

Opera singer

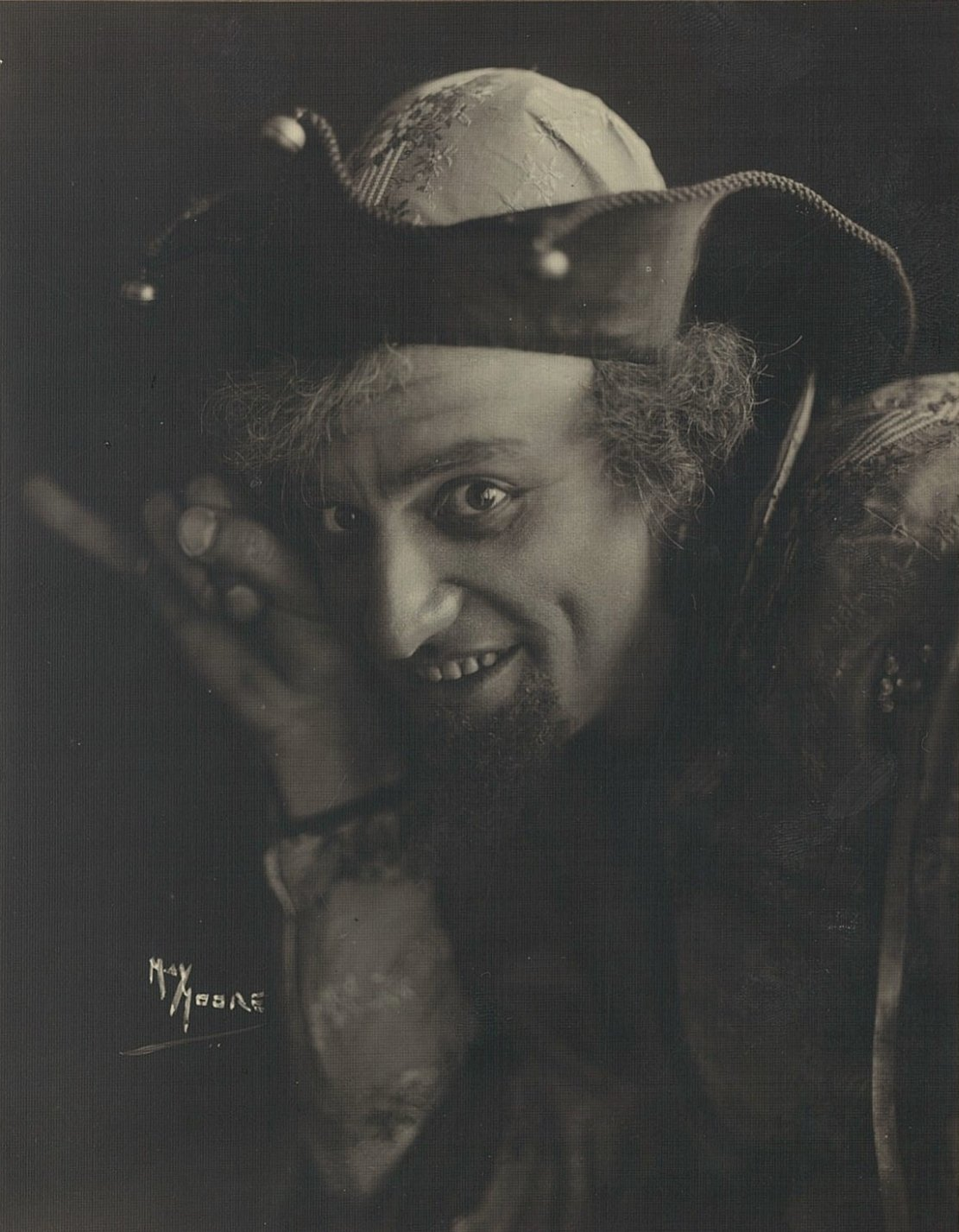
Anafesto Rossi as Rigoletto, photographed by May Moore, 1911

Anafesto Rossi (1883 – 1933) was an Italian operatic baritone.

He studied at the Liceo Musicale Benedetto Marcello of Venice and originally trained to be a cellist. He graduated in 1902 as a bass. He did additional training at Saffo Bellincioni school under Lelio Casini and Schneider.

Rossi made his debut in 1906 at the Sociale Broni in ‘’Traviata’’. He was nominated to the position of first baritone at the Imperial Theatre in Vienna. He performed with the Melba Grand Opera Company in 1911 and debuted at the Metropolitan Opera for a single performance of Count Di Luna in Il Trovatore in 1913. In 1912 he performed with the Chicago-Philadelphia and Boston Opera Companies.

He was said to have performed in Peru, Ecuador, Russia, France, Italy, Germany, Austria, England and the United States. After he traveled to the US, he said he had traveled to "every continent where opera is liked and known." The Boston Globe called him "something of a cartoonist" in the style of Caruso and was known for wearing a diamond ring that was given to him by the Kaiser. He retired from the stage in 1926 and died at a mental health facility in 1933.
