= Heinrich Panofka =

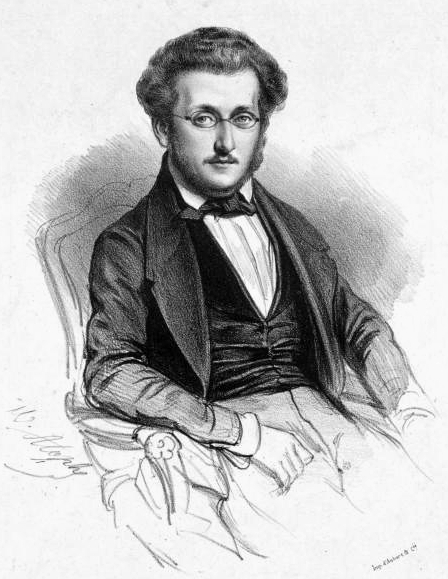
- Panofka, by Marie-Alexandre Alophe

Background information
- Born: 3 October 1807; Breslau, Germany
- Died: 18 November 1887 (aged 80) Florence, Italy
- Genre: Classical
- Occupations: Violinist, voice teacher, composer, writer
- Instrument: Violin

Heinrich Panofka (3 October 1807 – 18 November 1887) was a German violinist, voice teacher, writer on music and composer.

== Life ==
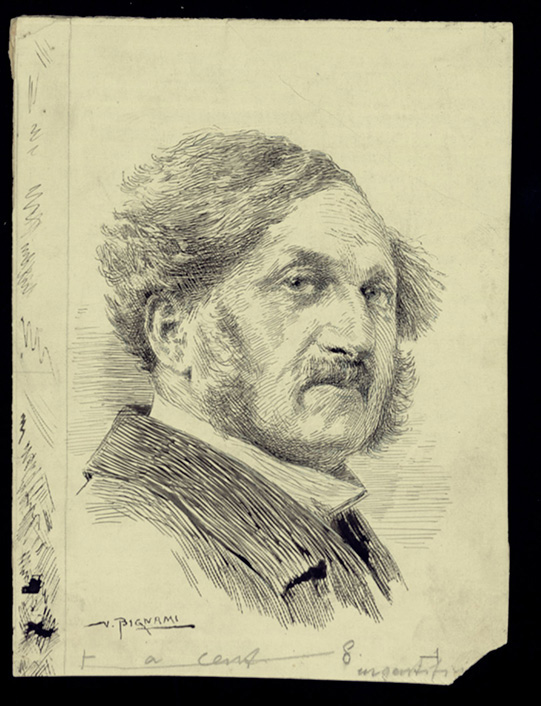
Heinrich Panofka portrayed by Vespasiano Bignami

Panofka was born in Breslau (present-day Wrocław) in 1807. As a child, he made rapid progress on the violin, and first performed in public aged ten. In 1824 he went to Breslau University to study law, according to the wishes of his father; afterward, following his own wishes, he went to Vienna where he was a student of the violinist Joseph Mayseder.

In 1827 he performed successfully in Vienna and tried to follow up his success by traveling to Munich and Berlin. On the death of his father in 1831 he received his inheritance. Although in the following year he was persuaded by pianist Wenzeslaus Hauck to go on a concert tour through Germany, he gave up touring in 1833.

In 1834 Panofka settled in Paris; here he met the singing teacher Marco Bordogni, and other singers including Giovanni Battista Rubini, Luigi Lablache and Domenico Donzelli. He became interested in the training of the voice, and with Bordogni he founded in 1842 an Académie de chant.

He moved to London in 1844, and in 1847 was engaged by Benjamin Lumley as one of his assistants at Her Majesty's Theatre. He became known as a teacher and published A Practical Singing Tutor and other vocal studies. He returned to Paris in 1852; about 1855 he published L'art de chanter. It was translated into Italian and German, and was much discussed before it gained acceptance from musical institutes.

From 1866 Panofka lived in Florence; he died in 1887.

== Works ==
Other works by Panofka include compositions for violin and piano, and for violin and orchestra. He translated Pierre Baillot's L'art du violon into German. Interested in the musical issues of the day, he contributed to Robert Schumann's magazine Neue Zeitschrift für Musik.
