= Christian du Plessis =

South African singer

Christian du Plessis (born 2 July 1944) is a South African baritone, largely based in England, and particularly associated with the bel canto repertory.

Born in Vryheid, South Africa, he studied in Johannesburg with Teasdale Griffiths and Esme Webb, and made his stage debut there, with the Transvaal Opera, as Yamadori in Madama Butterfly, in 1967. Further studies followed in London with Otokar Kraus, making his debut there in 1970, as Mathieu in Andrea Chénier.

He became a member of the English National Opera, where he sang the standard baritone repertory: Valentin, Luna, Posa, Marcello, Cecil, also Germont in a recording of La traviata, etc.

In the mid-1970s, he began concentrating in the bel canto repertory, making a specialty of lesser-known works by Donizetti and Bellini, appearing in concert performances for the London Opera Society and stage productions by Opera Rara, notably the title role in Torquato Tasso, Corrado in Maria de Rudenz, Ernesto in Il Pirata and Orazio in Orazi e Curiazi.

A warm-voiced and stylish singer, he can be heard on several Opera Rara recordings; Ugo, conte di Parigi, Gabriella di Vergy, L'assedio di Calais and Maria Padilla. He is also featured in a major recording of the opera Rigoletto featuring Luciano Pavarotti and Dame Joan Sutherland.

He formally retired from the stage in 1988.

== Sources ==
- Grove Music Online, Noël Goodwin, Oxford University Press, 2008.
