= Giuseppe Puzone =

Italian composer (1820–1914)

- Born: 12 February 1820; Naples, Kingdom of the Two Sicilies
- Died: 17 October 1914 (aged 94); Naples, Italy
- Occupations: composer; conductor

Giuseppe Puzone (12 February 1820 – 17 October 1914) was an Italian opera composer and conductor active in Naples, the city of his birth. He was for many years the principal conductor of the Teatro San Carlo where his opera Elfrida di Salerno had premiered in 1849. He composed three other operas, all of which premiered in Naples, as well as sacred and symphonic music.

== Life and career ==
Puzone was born in Naples, the son of Raffaele and Maria (née Aveta) Puzone. He began his music studies at the age of 11 as an external student at the Conservatory of San Pietro a Majella where he initially studied singing under Niccolò Zingarelli. However, in order to be admitted to the conservatory as a scholarship student, he was required to master an instrument as well. He took up the oboe and became sufficiently proficient within 18 months to win a scholarship for full-time study. After further study under Ferrazzano and Rossi, he was admitted to the conservatory's orchestra as second oboe, rapidly progressed to first oboe, and was then made a junior conductor. He went on to study piano under Francesco Lanza and composition and orchestration under Zingarelli, Donizetti, and Mercadante.

Puzone made his debut as an opera composer in 1839 while still a student at the conservatory with the premiere of Albergati at the Teatro Nuovo. He was appointed maestro concertatore of the Teatro San Carlo in 1844, a position he held for nearly 20 years during which time he also produced three more operas. In 1851 he was also appointed principal conductor at the theatre, sharing the post over the ensuing years with Nicola De Giosa and Paolo Serrao. It was Puzone and Serrao who arranged the score for the posthumous premiere of Donizetti's Gabriella di Vergy at the Teatro San Carlo in 1869. Described as a rifacimento (re-doing), their score combined elements from both the 1826 and 1838 versions by Donizetti with the addition of music from some of Donizetti's cantatas and lesser-known operas.

From 1875 until his retirement 30 years later Puzone was a professor of harmony and counterpoint at San Pietro a Majella. He died in Naples at the age of 94.

== Operas ==
- Albergati (melodramma in 2 acts); libretto by Pietro di Giannone; premiered Teatro Nuovo, Naples, 1839
- Il figlio dello schiavo (melodramma in 3 acts); libretto by Marco D'Arienzo; premiered Teatro del Fondo, Naples, 1845
- Elfrida di Salerno (tragedia lirica in 3 acts); libretto by Giuseppe Sesto-Giannini; premiered Teatro San Carlo, Naples, 1849
- Il dottor Sabato (commedia lirica in 3 acts); libretto by Almerindo Spadetta; premiered Teatro del Fondo, Naples, 1852
