= Bournemouth Sinfonietta =

The Bournemouth Sinfonietta was a chamber orchestra founded in 1968 as an offshoot of the Bournemouth Symphony Orchestra. It was disbanded in November 1999 after increasing difficulties in obtaining funding from local councils led to the decision to concentrate government funding on its larger parent.

== Formation ==
The orchestra was initially conducted by George Hurst, who acted as artistic adviser, and Nicholas Braithwaite, to perform the classical repertoire in the smaller venues of the south and west of England. In the first months of its existence, players interchanged between the Symphony Orchestra and the Sinfonietta, with some having to consult a chart to find out which orchestra they would play with the following week (leading occasionally to players going for the wrong rehearsal). The 'pool of players' idea was scrapped and the Sinfonietta became independent of the BSO, with more players moving across from the BSO in 1969.

== Concert repertoire ==
The Sinfonietta made its London debut on 9 January 1969 at the Queen Elizabeth Hall in a concert of Seiber, Milhaud, Webern and Varèse conducted by Edgar Cosma.

Among the premières given by the orchestra were:

Work	Year	Notes
Shanai-Awaz	1982	by John Mayer 1986 Cántico de San Francisco de Asís Joaquín Rodrigo
Cantiga (op. 45)	1988	by David Matthews
The Green Ray	1991	by Gavin Bryars
Percussion Concerto	1991	by Dominic Muldowney
Where The Bee Dances	1991	by Michael Nyman
Bean Rows and Blues Shots (saxophone concerto)	1991	by Mike Westbrook
The Song of the Tortoise, a cautionary tale for narrator, voices and orchestra	1992	by Giles Swayne
So in Darkness	1993	by Sadie Harrison
Concerto Antico for guitar and orchestra	1994	by Richard Harvey
Concerto for hurdy-gurdy and percussion	1994	by Howard Skempton
Concerto for String Orchestra	1997	by Rutland Boughton (composed 1937)
The song should never be silent, Side by side, The sleep of reason	1997	by Colin Riley

During its existence, the Bournemouth Sinfonietta gained a national reputation, appearing at The Proms in 1977, 1988 and 1992 and also undertook short overseas tours, including Germany in 1987; Italy and Turkey in 1992; Romania in 1994; Spain in 1991 and 1995; Brazil in 1996; and France in 1997. Venues in the south and west of England varied from small church halls, often in places which would otherwise hear no live professional orchestral music, to larger concert halls. From 1974 until 1986, the Sinfonietta was the orchestra for Glyndebourne on Tour.

The educational and outreach work of the Sinfonietta was recognised by a Prudential Award and a Sainsbury's "Arts for All" award. In Romania, in collaboration with the charity, 'Musika in Romania', the orchestra gave concerts, visited schools, an orphanage and an assessment centre for street children.

=== Bournemouth Sinfonietta Choir ===
The Bournemouth Sinfonietta Choir was founded in 1972 and continues to give concerts in Dorset and beyond. The Choir's director in 2008 was David Gostick, organist at Wimborne Minster.

== Principal conductors ==
Conductor	Years	Notes
Maurice Gendron	1971–73	Conductor/Director
Kenneth Montgomery	1973–77	
Volker Wangenheim	1977–80	
Ronald Thomas	1980–85	Musical Director; Leader from 1976
Roger Norrington	1985–89	
Tamás Vásáry	1989–97	also Artistic Director; Conductor Laureate 1997–99
Alexander Polianichko	1997–99	

== Recordings ==
Among the many recordings made by the Orchestra, ranging from the Baroque to the contemporary, are:

- Eduardo Angulo: Guitar Concerto No 2 (Rafael Jiménez/ Terence Frazor)
- Thomas Arne: Symphonies 1, 2, 3, 4 (Kenneth Montgomery)
- Malcolm Arnold: Concertos for flute, horn, clarinet, oboe and trumpet (Norman Del Mar)
- J C Bach: Sinfonias Op 6.3, Op 9.2, Op 18.2&4 (Kenneth Montgomery)
- C P E Bach: Cello Concertos (Tim Hugh/ Richard Studt)
- Granville Bantock: Pierrot of the Minute (Norman Del Mar)
- Béla Bartók: Divertimento for Strings (Richard Studt)
- Richard Blackford: Mirror of Perfection (Ying Huang, Bo Skovhus/ Richard Blackford)
- Frank Bridge: Suite for Strings, Summer (Norman del Mar)
- George Butterworth: The Banks of Green Willow (Norman del Mar)
- Ludwig van Beethoven: Violin Concerto & Romances 1 & 2 (Ronald Thomas)
- Luigi Boccherini: Cello Concertos (Frédéric Lodéon/ Theodor Guschlbauer)
- William Boyce: The Eight Symphonies (Ronald Thomas)
- Benjamin Britten: Variations on a Theme of Frank Bridge, Simple Symphony (Ronald Thomas)
- Gavin Bryars: The Green Ray (John Harle/ Ivor Bolton)
- Frederick Delius: On Hearing the First Cuckoo in Spring, A Song before Sunrise, Late Swallows (Norman del Mar)
- Georg Druschetzky: Partita for 6 Timpani and Orchestra, Concerto for Oboe, 8 Timpani & Orchestra (Jonathan Haas, Gordon Hunt/ Harold Farberman)
- Edward Elgar: Chanson de Matin & Chanson de Nuit, Dream Children, Contrasts, Soliloquy, Three Bavarian Dances (Leon Goossens/Norman Del Mar), Serenade in E minor, King Arthur Suite, Starlight Express Suite (George Hurst)
- Johann Christian Fischer: Symphony for 8 timpani & orchestra (Jonathan Haas/ Harold Farberman)
- Percy Grainger: Youthful Suite, Blithe Bells, Green Bushes, Country Gardens, Youthful Rapture, Shepherd's Hey, Molly on the Shore, Handel in the Strand (Moray Welsh, Philip Martin/ Kenneth Montgomery)
- Edvard Grieg: Holberg Suite (Richard Studt)
- George Handel: Opera overtures (Kenneth Montgomery)
- Joseph Haydn: Symphonies Nos. 87, 88, 103 and 104 (Ronald Thomas), Cello Concertos (Frédéric Lodéon/ Theodor Guschlbauer)
- Joseph Haydn: Organ concertos 1–3 (Marie-Claire Alain/Theodor Guschlbauer)
- Michael Haydn: Symphonies, Nos. 19, 21, 23, 26, 29, 37, 39, 41 (Harold Farberman)
- Gustav Holst: St Paul's Suite (George Hurst)
- Arthur Honegger: Symphony No.4, Pastorale d'été (Tamás Vasary)
- John Ireland: Concertino Pastorale (George Hurst)
- Bohuslav Martinu: Sinfonietta Giocosa, Toccata e Due Canzoni, Sinfonietta La Jolla (Tamás Vasary)
- David Matthews: Cantiga, September Music, Introit (Jill Gomez/ John Carewe)
- E J Moeran: Sinfonietta, Cello Concerto (Raphael Wallfisch/ Norman del Mar)
- WA Mozart: Symphonies Nos. 36 & 39 (Terence Fragor), Four Horn Concertos (Michael Thompson), Piano Concerto No 21 (Tamás Vasary), Serenade in C minor K388 (Howard Nelson), Violin Concertos 3 & 4 (Jean-Jacques Kantorow, Theodor Guschlbauer), Sinfonia Concertante (Richard Studt, Nodar Jvania), Clarinet Concerto (Joan Enric Lluna), Oboe Concerto (Andrew Knights / Richard Studt)
- Carl Nielsen: Little Suite for Strings (Montgomery) (Studt)
- Michael Nyman: Where the Bee Dances (John Harle/ Ivor Bolton)
- Arvo Pärt: Tabula rasa, Summa, Festina lente, Cantus in memory of Britten (Tasmin Little/ Richard Studt)
- Henry Purcell: Overtures (Ronald Thomas)
- Respighi: The Birds, Il tramonto, Trittico Botticelliano (Tamás Vasary)
- Joaquin Rodrigo: Concierto de Aranjüez (Rafael Jiménez/ Terence Frazor)
- Edmund Rubbra : Improvisations, Symphony No 10 (Hans-Hubert Schönzeler)
- John Rutter: Requiem, Works for Choir and Orchestra (Stephen Layton)
- Camille Saint-Saëns : Cello Concertos 1 & 2, Suite Op 16 (Maria Kliegel, Jean-Francois Monnard)
- Charles Villiers Stanford : Symphony No 3 'Irish' (Norman del Mar)
- Igor Stravinsky: Pulcinella (Ian Bostridge, Henry Herford/ Stefan Sanderling), Concerto in D for string orchestra (Richard Studt)
- Arthur Sullivan : Excerpts from operettas (Valerie Masterson, Robert Tear/ Kenneth Alwyn)
- Johan Svendsen: Icelandic Melodies, Norwegian and Swedish Folksongs (Richard Studt)
- Ralph Vaughan Williams: Overture 'The Poisoned Kiss', Two Hymn-tune Preludes, The Running Set, Sea Songs (George Hurst), Flos campi, Suite for viola and orchestra (Frederick Riddle/ Norman Del Mar)
- Heitor Villa-Lobos: Guitar Concerto (Rafael Jiménez/ Terence Frazor)
- Antonio Vivaldi: 12 Concertos Op 8 (Ronald Thomas)
- Peter Warlock: Capriol Suite (George Hurst)
- Samuel Wesley: Symphony in D (Kenneth Montgomery)
- Mike Westbrook: Bean Rows and Blues Shots (John Harle/ Ivor Bolton)
- Dag Wiren: Serenade for Strings (Kenneth Montgomery) (Richard Studt)

Recording venues included Southampton Guildhall, Christchurch Priory, Poole Arts Centre (The Lighthouse) and the Bournemouth Winter Gardens.
