= Torquato Tasso (opera) =

Opera by Gaetano Donizetti

- Opera by Gaetano Donizetti
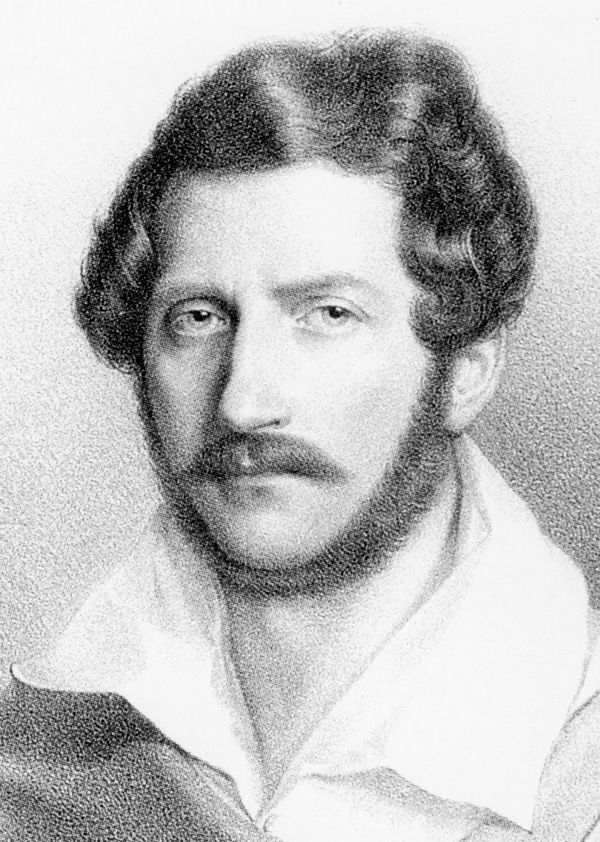
- Gaetano Donizetti c. 1835
- Librettist: Jacopo Ferretti
- Language: Italian
- Based on: Life of Torquato Tasso
- Premiere: 9 September 1833; Teatro Valle, Rome

Torquato Tasso is a melodramma semiserio, or "semi-serious" opera, in three acts by Gaetano Donizetti and based on the life of the great poet Torquato Tasso. The Italian libretto was written by Jacopo Ferretti, who used a number of sources for his text, including works by Giovanni Rosini, Goethe, Goldoni and Lord Byron, as well as Tasso's actual poetry. It premiered on 9 September 1833 at the Teatro Valle, Rome.

The work has been criticized for "its odd deployment of vocal types" characteristic of the semiseria genre.

== Roles ==
Role	Voice type	Premiere Cast, 9 September 1833 (Conductor: - )
Eleonora, Duke Alfonso's sister	soprano	Adelina Spech-Salvi
Eleonora, Countess of Scandiano	mezzo-soprano	Angiolina Carocci
Torquato Tasso	baritone	Giorgio Ronconi
Roberto Geraldini, the duke's secretary	tenor	Antonio Poggi
Don Gherardo	bass	Ferdinando Lauretti
Ambrogio, Torquato's servant	tenor	Luigi Garofalo
Alfonso II, Duke of Ferrara	bass	Antonio Rinaldi
Pages, knights

== Synopsis ==
Time: 16th century
Place: Ferrara, Northern Italy

== Recordings ==
Year	Cast (Torquato Tasso, Eleanore d'Este, Roberto, Don Gherhardo)	Conductor, Opera House and Orchestra	Label
1974	Christian du Plessis, Janet Price, Bruce Brewer, Andrea Snarski	Kenneth Montgomery, Opera Rara Orchestra and Chorus (Recording of a performance in the Collegiate Theatre, London as part of the Camden Festival on 27 February and 1 and 2 March)	Audio CD: Celestial Audio; Cat: CA 247
1985	Simone Alaimo, Luciana Serra, Ernesto Palacio, Roberto Coviello	Massimo De Bernart; Orchestra and chorus of Teatro Comunale, Genova	Audio CD: Bongiovanni; Cat: GB 2028/0-2
