= Vincenzo Moscuzza =

Italian composer

Vincenzo Moscuzza (1827–1896) was an Italian composer. Born in Syracuse, Sicily, he was the son of composer Luigi Moscuzza, and his initial musical training was from his father. He later studied at the Naples Conservatory with Saverio Mercadante. He is chiefly known for his many operas, of which his most successful were Stradella il trovatore (1850), Don Carlo (1862), and Gonzales Davila (1869). He died in Naples.
