= Gabriella di Vergy =

Opera by Gaetano Donizetti

- Opera seria by Gaetano Donizetti
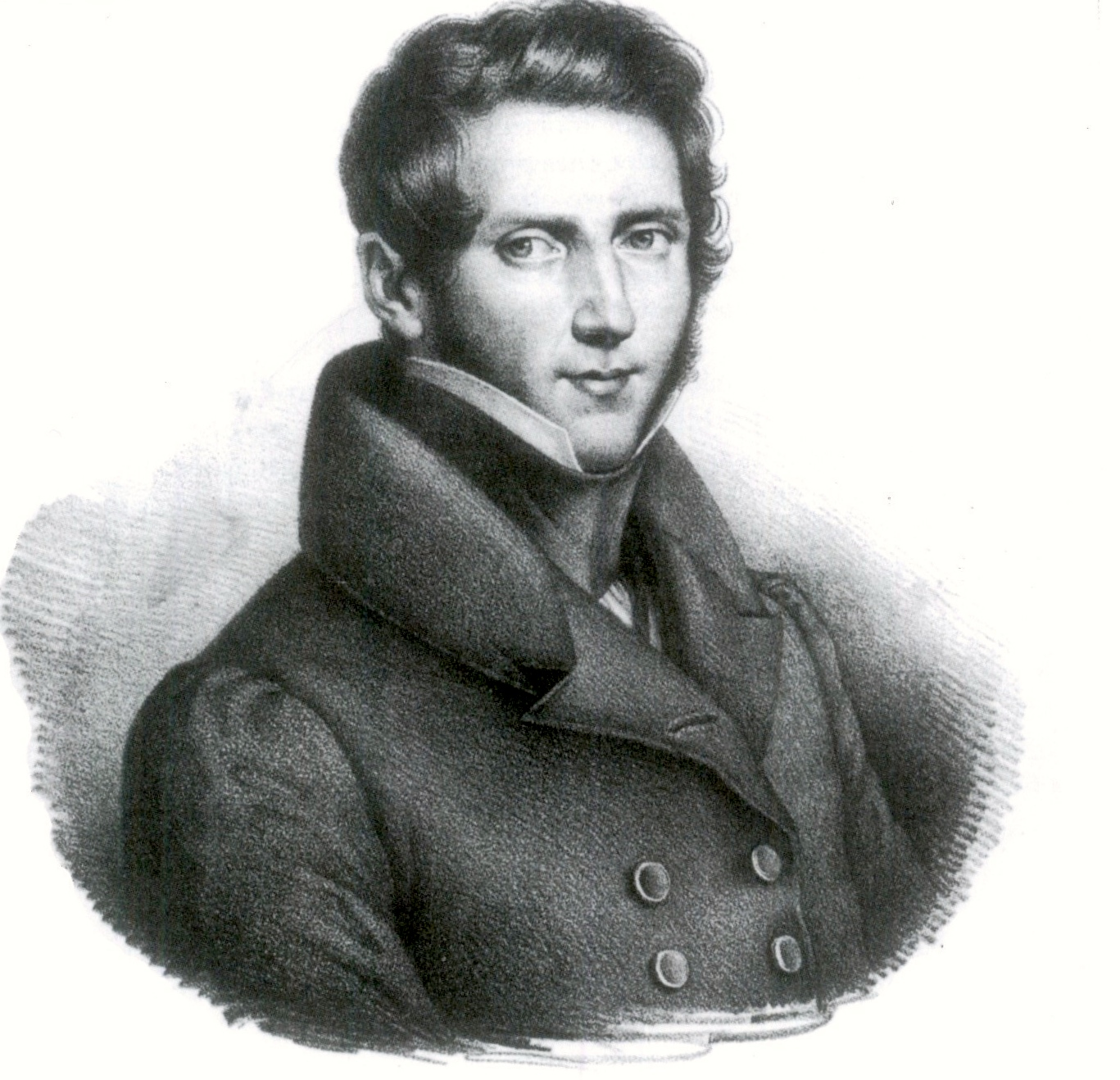
- The young composer, who wrote the opera in 1826
- Librettist: Andrea Leone Tottola
- Language: Italian
- Based on: Dormont De Belloy's Gabrielle de Vergy
- Premiere: 29 November 1869; Teatro San Carlo, Naples

Gabriella di Vergy is an opera seria in two acts by Gaetano Donizetti written in 1826 and revised in 1838, from a libretto by Andrea Leone Tottola, which was based on the tragedy Gabrielle de Vergy (1777) by Dormont De Belloy. Prior to that, the play was itself inspired by two French medieval legends, Le châtelain de Coucy et la dame de Fayel and Le Roman de la chastelaine de Vergy.

The story had already been the subject of an opera by Michele Carafa (1816) and had previously been used by Johann Simon Mayr (Raul di Créqui, Milan, 1809), Francesco Morlacchi (Raoul de Créqui, Dresden, 1811), and Carlo Coccia (Fayel, Florence, 1817). It was also subsequently used as Gabriella di Vergy by Saverio Mercadante in 1828.

"In its original form the opera was never performed", but parts of the original version were re-used by Donizetti in his other operas Otto mesi in due ore (Naples, 1827), L’esule di Roma (Naples 1828), Il paria (Naples 1829) and Anna Bolena. For the revised version, Donizetti revisited Gabriella di Vergy and incorporated into the opera parts of Ugo, conte di Parigi (Milan 1832), Rosmonda d'Inghilterra (Florence 1834) and Maria de Rudenz (Venice 1838).

== Performance history ==
After Donizetti's death, his Gabriella di Vergy finally received its first performance on 29 November 1869 at the Teatro San Carlo in Naples with the title of Gabriella. However, the score was a rifacimento (re-doing), compiled by Giuseppe Puzone (who had been Donizetti's student) and Paolo Serrao. They combined elements from both the 1826 and 1838 versions as well as music from some of Donizetti's cantatas and his lesser-known operas.

The 1838 version of the opera was rediscovered in 1978 by Don White and Patric Schmid of Opera Rara. Subsequently, it was given its first performance in the UK on 9 September 1978 in Belfast and recorded. The first fully-staged UK performance was given by the Dorset Opera Festival on 31 August 1985.

== Roles ==
Role	Voice type	Premiere Cast, 29 November 1869 (Conductor: - Nicola De Giosa)
Gabriella di Vergy	soprano	Marcella Lotti della Santa
Almeide, Fayel's sister	soprano	Carolina Certoné
Fayel, earl of Vermand	baritone	Giuseppe Villani
Raoul	tenor	Gottardo Aldighieri
Filippo Augusto	bass	Marco Arati
Armando, Fayel's friend	bass	Memmi
Fayel's relatives, Gabriella's bridesmaids', followers of Filippo, people

== Synopsis ==
Place: Burgundy
Time: Middle Ages

Gabriella has married Fayel under pressure from her father and the reported death of Raoul, the man she really loves on his return from the Crusades. She discovers too late that she had been deceived and that Raoul is alive. Raoul returns and accuses her of perfidy. Meanwhile, he is under pressure from the Emperor to marry Fayel's sister, Almeide. The story has a tragic and macabre end. Raoul is killed by Fayel in a duel. Fayel cuts out his heart and brings it to Gabriella in an urn. She goes mad and dies of a broken heart. Her final words to Fayel, and the final words of the opera are her wish for the foaming blood in the urn to rise up and cover Fayel's face and for Raoul's ghost to rise from its tomb to embed in Fayel's heart the knife he had used to cut out Raoul's.

== Recordings ==
Year	Cast (Gabriella, Fayel, Raoul, King)	Conductor, Opera House and Orchestra	Label
1979	Ludmilla Andrew, Christian Duplessis, Maurice Arthur, John Tomlinson	Alun Francis, Royal Philharmonic Orchestra and Geoffrey Mitchell Choir	Audio CD: Opera Rara; Cat: OR 3
