= List of operas by Gaetano Donizetti =

The Italian composer Gaetano Donizetti (1797–1848) is best known for his operas, of which he wrote about 75 from 1816 to 1845.

== List of operas ==
Operas by Gaetano Donizetti
Title	Genre	Acts	Libretto	Premiere	
Title	Genre	Acts	Libretto	Date	Venue
Il Pigmalione	scena drammatica	1 act		13 October 1960, completed 1816	Bergamo, Teatro Donizetti
L’Olimpiade	Opera seria	3 act	Metastasio's L'Olimpiade	incomplete, composed 1817	
L'ira di Achille		1 act		incomplete, composed 1817	
Enrico di Borgogna	melodramma	2 acts	Bartolomeo Merelli	14 November 1818	Venice, Teatro San Luca
Una follia	farsa	1 act	Bartolomeo Merelli	17 December 1818, lost	Venice, Teatro San Luca
I piccioli virtuosi ambulanti (Note: Pasticcio performed by Mayr's students)	opera buffa	1 act		1819	
Il falegname di Livonia, o Pietro il grande, czar delle Russie	opera buffa	2 acts	Gherardo Bevilacqua-Aldobrandini	26 December 1819	Venice, Teatro San Samuele
Le nozze in villa	opera buffa	2 acts	Bartolomeo Merelli	carnival 1820–1821, completed 1819	Mantua, Teatro Vecchio
Zoraida di Granata	melodramma eroico	2 acts	Bartolomeo Merelli; revised for Rome 1824 by Jacopo Ferretti	28 January 1822	Rome, Teatro Argentina, rev. 7 January 1824 at the same theatre
La zingara	dramma	2 acts	Andrea Leone Tottola	12 May 1822	Naples, Teatro Nuovo
La lettera anonima	farsa	1 act	Giulio Genoino	29 June 1822	Naples, Teatro del Fondo
Chiara e Serafina, o Il pirata	melodramma semiserio	2 acts	Felice Romani, after Pixérécourt's La cisterne	26 October 1822	Milan, La Scala
Alfredo il grande	dramma per musica	2 acts	Andrea Leone Tottola	2 July 1823	Naples, Teatro di San Carlo
Il fortunato inganno	dramma giocoso	2 acts	Andrea Leone Tottola	3 September 1823	Naples, Teatro Nuovo
L'ajo nell'imbarazzo [see also Don Gregorio]	melodramma giocoso	2 acts	Jacopo Ferretti, after Giovanni Giraud's comedy	4 February 1824	Rome, Teatro Valle
Emilia di Liverpool [see also L'eremitaggio di Liverpool]	dramma semiserio	2 acts	anonymous, after S. Scatizzi's Emilia de Laverpaut	28 July 1824	Naples, Teatro Nuovo
Alahor in Granata	dramma	2 acts	M. A.	7 January 1826	Palermo, Teatro Carolino
Don Gregorio [rev of L'ajo nell'imbarazzo]	melodramma giocoso	2 acts	Jacopo Ferretti	11 June 1826	Naples, Teatro Nuovo
Elvida	dramma	1 act	Giovanni F. Schmidt	6 July 1826	Naples, Teatro di San Carlo
Gabriella di Vergy	tragedia lirica	3 acts	Andrea Leone Tottola, after Dormont de Belloy	29 November 1869, completed 1826	Naples, Teatro di San Carlo
Olivo e Pasquale	melodramma giocoso	2 acts	Jacopo Ferretti, after Simeone Antonio Sografi	7 January 1827	Rome, Teatro Valle
Otto mesi in due ore, ossia Gli esiliati in Siberia	opera romantica	3 acts	Domenico Gilardoni, after Pixérécourt's La fille de l'exilé	13 May 1827	Naples, Teatro Nuovo
Il borgomastro di Saardam	melodramma giocoso	2 acts	Domenico Gilardoni, after Mélesville, Jean-Toussaint Merle and Eugène Cantiran de Boirie	19 August 1827	Naples, Teatro del Fondo
Le convenienze teatrali [see also Le convenienze ed inconvenienze teatrali]	farsa	1 act	Gaetano Donizetti, after Simeone Antonio Sografi	21 November 1827	Naples, Teatro Nuovo
L'esule di Roma, ossia Il proscritto	melodramma eroico	2 acts	Domenico Gilardoni, after Luigi Marchionni's Il proscritto romano	1 January 1828	Naples, Teatro di San Carlo
L'eremitaggio di Liverpool [rev of Emilia di Liverpool]	melodramma semiserio	2 acts	Giuseppe Checcherini, after Scatizzi	8 March 1828	Naples, Teatro Nuovo
Alina, regina di Golconda	melodramma	2 acts	Felice Romani, after Sedaine's libretto for Monsigny's opera-ballet Aline, reine de Golconde	12 May 1828	Genoa, Teatro Carlo Felice
Gianni di Calais	melodramma semiserio	3 acts	Domenico Gilardoni, after a novel by Arlincourt	2 August 1828	Naples, Teatro del Fondo
Il paria	melodramma	2 acts	Domenico Gilardoni, after Delavigne	12 January 1829	Naples, Teatro di San Carlo
Il giovedì grasso, o Il nuovo Pourceaugnac	farsa	1 act	Domenico Gilardoni	26 February 1829	Naples, Teatro del Fondo
Elisabetta al castello di Kenilworth	melodramma	3 acts	Andrea Leone Tottola, after Scribe's Leicester and Hugo's Amy Robsart	6 July 1829	Naples, Teatro di San Carlo
Alina, regina di Golconda [rev]	melodramma	2 acts	Felice Romani, after Sedaine	10 October 1829	Rome, Teatro Valle
I pazzi per progetto	farsa	1 act	Domenico Gilardoni	6 February 1830	Naples, Teatro di San Carlo
Il diluvio universale	azione tragica-sacra	3 acts	Domenico Gilardoni, after Byron's Heaven and Earth and Francesco Ringhieri's tragedy Il diluvio	6 March 1830	Naples, Teatro di San Carlo
Imelda de' Lambertazzi	melodramma tragico	2 acts	Andrea Leone Tottola	5 September 1830	Naples, Teatro di San Carlo
Anna Bolena	tragedia lirica	2 acts	Felice Romani, after Pindemonte's tragedy Enrico VIII, ossia Anna Bolena and Alessandro Pepoli's Anna Bolena	26 December 1830	Milan, Teatro Carcano
Gianni di Parigi	melodramma comico	2 acts	Felice Romani, after Saint-Just's libretto for Boieldieu's opéra-comique Jean de Paris	10 September 1839, composed c. 1828–1831	Milan, La Scala
Le convenienze ed inconvenienze teatrali [rev of Le convenienze teatrali]	dramma giocoso	2 acts	Donizetti, after Sografi	20 April 1831	Milan, Teatro alla Canobbiana
Francesca di Foix	melodramma	1 act	Domenico Gilardoni, after a libretto by Jean-Nicolas Bouilly and Emmanuel Mercier-Dupaty for Henri-Montan Berton's 3-act opéra-comique Françoise de Foix.	30 May 1831	Naples, Teatro di San Carlo
La romanziera e l'uomo nero (or La romanzesca e l'uomo nero)	farsa	1 act	Domenico Gilardoni	18 June 1831	Naples, Teatro del Fondo (arias and ensembles survive but spoken dialogue is lost)
Fausta	melodramma	2 acts	Domenico Gilardoni and Donizetti	12 January 1832	Naples, Teatro di San Carlo
Ugo, conte di Parigi	tragedia lirica	2 acts	Felice Romani, after Hippolyte-Louis-Florent Bis: Blanche d'Aquitaine	13 March 1832	Milan, La Scala
L'elisir d'amore	melodramma giocoso	2 acts	Felice Romani, after Scribe's libretto for Auber's Le philtre	12 May 1832	Milan, Teatro alla Canobbiana
Sancia di Castiglia	tragedia lirica	2 acts	Pietro Salatino	4 November 1832	Naples, Teatro di San Carlo
Il furioso all'isola di San Domingo	melodramma	2 acts	Jacopo Ferretti, after an anonymous play on Cervantes' Don Quixote	2 January 1833	Rome, Teatro Valle
Otto mesi in due ore [rev]	opera romantica	3 acts	Antonio Alcozer after Domenico Gilardoni	1833	Livorno
Parisina	melodramma	3 acts	Felice Romani, after Byron	17 March 1833	Florence, Teatro della Pergola
Torquato Tasso	melodramma	3 acts	Jacopo Ferretti	9 September 1833	Rome, Teatro Valle
Lucrezia Borgia	melodramma	prologue & 2 acts	Felice Romani, after Victor Hugo	26 December 1833	Milan, La Scala
Il diluvio universale [rev]	azione tragico-sacra	3 acts	anonymous, after Domenico Gilardoni	17 January 1834	Genoa, Teatro Carlo Felice
Rosmonda d'Inghilterra	melodramma serio	2 acts	Felice Romani	27 February 1834	Florence, Teatro della Pergola
Maria Stuarda	tragedia lirica	2 acts (or 3)	Giuseppe Bardari, after Andrea Maffei's translation of Schiller	30 December 1835 (in 3 acts), completed August 1834	Milan, La Scala
Buondelmonte [rev of Maria Stuarda]	tragedia lirica	2 acts	Pietro Salatino	18 October 1834	Naples, Teatro di San Carlo
Gemma di Vergy	tragedia lirica	2 acts	Giovanni Emanuele Bidera, after the play Charles VII by Dumas	26 December 1834	Milan, La Scala
Marino Faliero	tragedia lirica	3 acts	Giovanni Emanuele Bidera with revisions by Agostino Ruffini, after Casimir Delavigne's adaptation of Byron's play Marino Faliero, Doge of Venice	12 March 1835	Paris, Théâtre-Italien
Lucia di Lammermoor [see also Lucie de Lammermoor]	dramma tragico	3 acts	Salvadore Cammarano, after Walter Scott's The Bride of Lammermoor	26 September 1835	Naples, Teatro di San Carlo
Belisario	tragedia lirica	3 acts	Salvadore Cammarano, after Eduard von Schenk as translated by Luigi Marchionni	4 February 1836	Venice, La Fenice
Il campanello di notte	melodramma giocoso	1 act	Donizetti, after the vaudeville La sonnette de nuit by Léon Lévy Brunswick (Léon Lhérie), Mathieu-Barthélemy Troin, and Victor Lhérie	1 June 1836	Naples, Teatro Nuovo
Betly, o La capanna svizzera	dramma giocoso	1 act	Donizetti, after Scribe's and Mélesville's libretto for Adam's Le chalet	21 August 1836	Naples, Teatro Nuovo
L'assedio di Calais	dramma lirico	3 acts	Salvadore Cammarano, after Dormont de Belloy	19 November 1836	Naples, Teatro di San Carlo
Pia de' Tolomei	tragedia lirica	2 acts	Salvadore Cammarano, after Bartolomeo Sestini, and Dante's La commedia	18 February 1837	Venice, Teatro Apollo
Pia de' Tolomei [rev]	tragedia lirica	2 acts	Salvadore Cammarano, after Bartolomeo Sestini, and Dante's La commedia	31 July 1837	Sinigaglia
Betly [rev]	dramma giocoso	2 acts	Donizetti	29 September 1837	Naples, Teatro del Fondo
Roberto Devereux	tragedia lirica	3 acts	Salvadore Cammarano, after Jacques-François Ancelot's tragedy Elisabeth d'Angleterre	28 October 1837	Naples, Teatro di San Carlo
Maria de Rudenz	dramma tragico	3 acts	Salvadore Cammarano, after the play La nonne sanglante by Auguste Anicet-Bourgeois, Cuvelier and Maillan	30 January 1838	Venice, La Fenice
Gabriella di Vergy [rev]	tragedia lirica	3 acts	Andrea Leone Tottola, after Dormont de Belloy	August 1978 recording, composed 1838	London
Poliuto [see also Les martyrs]	tragedia lirica	3 acts	Salvadore Cammarano, after Pierre Corneille	30 November 1848, completed July 1838	Naples, Teatro di San Carlo
Pia de' Tolomei [rev 2]	tragedia lirica	2 acts	anonymous revision of Cammarano's libretto	May 1838	Rome, Teatro Argentina
Lucie de Lammermoor [rev of Lucia di Lammermoor, in French]	grand opéra	3 acts (or 4)	Alphonse Royer and Gustave Vaëz, after the Italian libretto	6 August 1839	Paris, Théâtre de la Renaissance
Le duc d'Albe [see also Il duca d'Alba]	grand opéra	4 acts	Charles Duveyrier and Eugène Scribe	incomplete, composed 1839	
L'Ange de Nisida [see also La favorite]	opera semiseria	4 parts	Alphonse Royer and Gustave Vaëz	18 July 2018 Completed 27 December 1839	Royal Opera House, London
Lucrezia Borgia [rev]	dramma per musica	prologue & 2 acts	Felice Romani, after Victor Hugo	11 January 1840	Milan, La Scala
Les martyrs [rev of Poliuto, in French]	grand opéra	4 acts	Eugène Scribe's revision and expansion of Cammarano's original libretto	10 April 1840	Paris Opera, Salle Le Peletier
La fille du régiment	opéra comique	2 acts	Jean-François-Alfred Bayard and Jules-Henri Vernoy de Saint Georges	11 February 1840	Paris, Opéra-Comique
Lucrezia Borgia [rev 2]	dramma per musica	prologue & 2 acts	Felice Romani, after Victor Hugo	31 October 1840	Paris, Théâtre-Italien
La favorite [rev of L'ange de Nisida]	grand opéra	4 acts	Alphonse Royer, Gustave Vaëz and Eugène Scribe	2 December 1840	Paris Opera, Salle Le Peletier
Adelia	melodramma serio	3 acts	Felice Romani (Acts 1 & 2) and Girolamo Marini (Act 3), after an anonymous French play	11 February 1841	Rome, Teatro Apollo
Rita (subtitled ou Le Mari battu)	opéra comique	1 act	Gustave Vaëz	7 May 1860, completed 1841	Paris, Opéra-Comique
Maria Padilla	melodramma	3 acts	Gaetano Rossi and Donizetti, after Jacques-François Ancelot	26 December 1841	Milan, La Scala
Linda di Chamounix	melodramma semiserio	3 acts	Gaetano Rossi	19 May 1842	Vienna, Kärntnertortheater
Linda di Chamounix [rev]	melodramma semiserio	3 acts	Gaetano Rossi	17 November 1842	Paris, Théâtre-Italien
Caterina Cornaro	tragedia lirica	prologue & 2 acts	Giacomo Sacchèro, after Jules-Henri Vernoy de Saint-Georges' libretto for Halévy's La reine de Chypre	18 January 1844	Naples, Teatro di San Carlo
Don Pasquale	dramma buffo	3 acts	Giovanni Ruffini and Donizetti, after Angelo Anelli's Ser Marcantonio; published with credit to "M.A."	3 January 1843	Paris, Théâtre-Italien
Maria di Rohan	melodramma tragico	3 acts	Salvadore Cammarano, after Lockroy (J. P. Simon) and Badon's Un duel sous le Cardinal de Richelieu	5 June 1843	Vienna, Kärntnertortheater
Dom Sébastien, roi de Portugal	grand opéra	5 acts	Eugène Scribe, after the play by Paul Foucher	13 November 1843	Paris Opera, Salle Le Peletier
Dom Sebastian von Portugal [rev of Dom Sébastien]	große Oper	5 acts	Leo Herz's translation of Scribe's libretto	6 February 1845	Vienna, Kärntnertortheater
Il duca d'Alba [completion by Matteo Salvi of original Le duc d'Albe]	opera	4 acts	Angelo Zanardini's revision of the original libretto by Duveyrier and Scribe	22 March 1882	Rome, Teatro Apollo
Dalinda [3rd and substantial revision of Lucrezia Borgia, intended for Naples, but rejected by the censors; then lost; rediscovered in 2019]	opera seria	3 acts	Felice Romani	14 May 2023 (concert); 4 September 2024 (stage)	Konzerthaus Berlin; Baxter Theatre, Opera UCT
