= Il paria =

Opera by Gaetano Donizetti

- Opera by Gaetano Donizetti
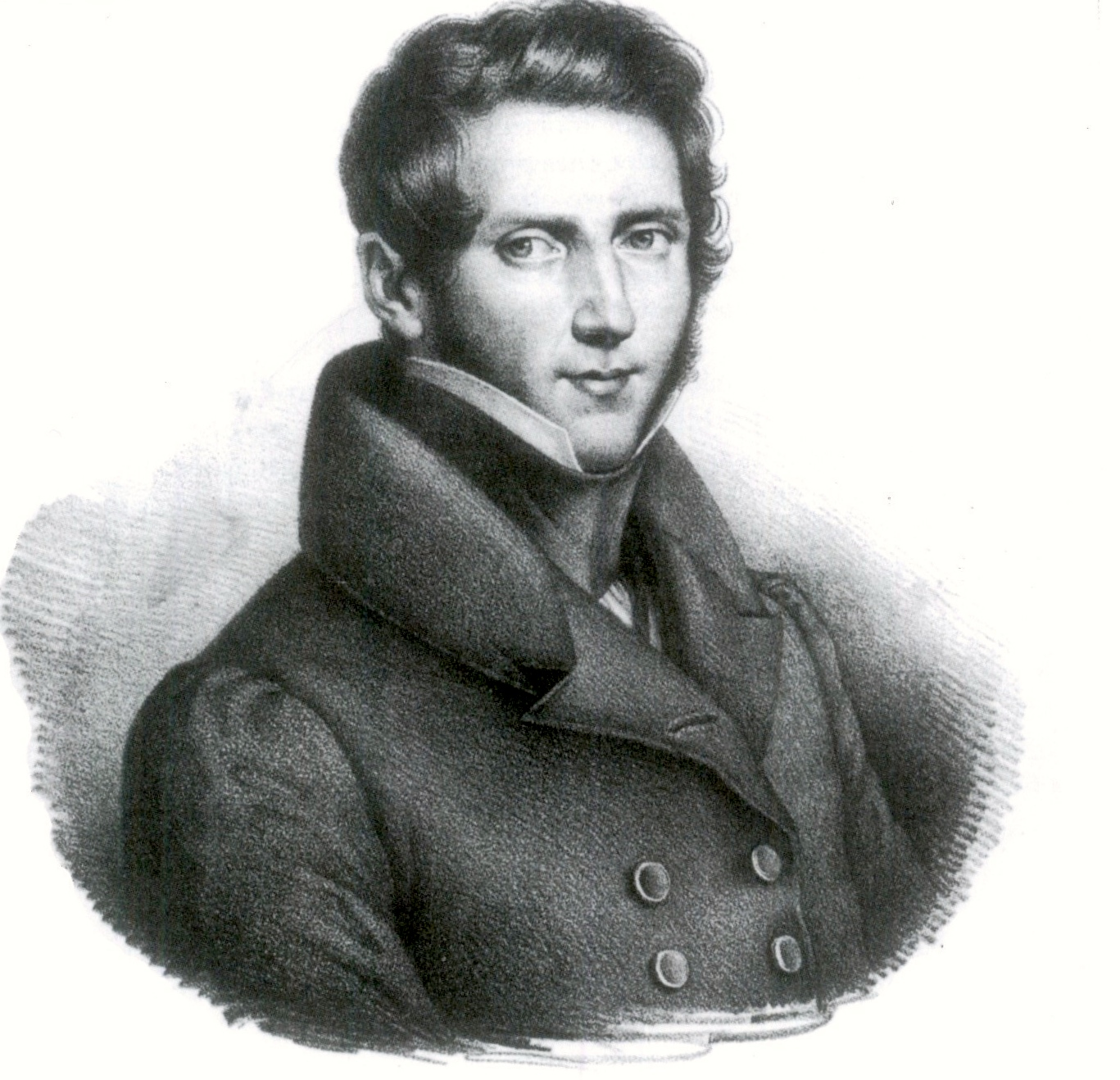
- Donizetti as a young man
- Librettist: Domenico Gilardoni
- Language: Italian
- Based on: La Paria by Casimir Delavigne
- Premiere: 12 January 1829; Teatro San Carlo, Naples

Il paria (The Outcast) is an opera in two acts by Gaetano Donizetti from a libretto by Domenico Gilardoni, based on Le Paria by Casimir Delavigne and Michele Carafa's Il paria with a libretto by Gaetano Rossi.

Completed in the winter of 1828, it was first performed on 12 January 1829 at the Teatro San Carlo, Naples. The opera had modest success, with six performances and Donizetti was not satisfied. In a letter to his father he announced his intentions to revise it, but the idea was abandoned.

The scholar William Ashbrook, has called this work "Donizetti's finest achievement up to this point", praising the adhesion of the vocal writing to the dramatic situations and the sense of proportions, stressing in particular the use of a quartet instead of the classic final. According to Ashbrook, the limited luck of Paria is due in large part to the libretto, with its numerous dramatic flaws, and lack of a final decisive dramaturgy.

Some portions were re-used in other works by Donizetti, including Lucrezia Borgia, Anna Bolena, La romanziera e l'uomo nero, Torquato Tasso, and Le duc d'Albe, as well as in Il diluvio universale.

== Roles ==
Role	Voice type	Premiere Cast, 12 January 1829 (Conductor: - )
Neala, Daughter of Akebare	soprano	Adelaide Tosi
Idamore Warrior leader, a Pariah	tenor	Giovanni Battista Rubini
Zarete, Idamore's father	baritone	Luigi Lablache
Akebare, Neala's father, Brahmin high priest	bass	Giovanni Campagnoli
Zaide, Priestess	contralto	Edvige Ricci
Empsaele, Brahmin, Akebare's confidant	tenor	Domenico Chizzola
Chorus of priests, priestesses, bayaderes, trumpeters, warriors, people, guardians of the temple, fakirs

== Synopsis ==
Time: "The distant past"
Place: Benares

=== Act 1 ===
Akebare, high priest of the Brahmins, plans to give his daughter, Neala, in marriage to a valiant warrior. He has already chosen Idamore, the leader of the warriors, who is to return victorious after defeating the Portuguese enemies, even though he hates him for the glory he receives. Neala is in love with Idamore but is unaware of her father's choice, hence she fears for their destiny.

Idamore, who returns the affection of Neala, has a secret: he is a Pariah, a member of a caste mortally hated by the Brahmins because it is considered cursed by the god Brahma, but he succeeded in becoming a warrior concealing his origin.

The father of Idamore, Zarete, has for a long time heard no news from his son, and now arrives incognito, searching. When he gets to talk to his son and learns that Idamore is about to marry the daughter of their mortal enemy, the Brahmins, a fight between the two breaks out. But ultimately Idamore promises his father he will flee with him, asking his permission to say goodbye to Neala first.

=== Act 2 ===
Idamore, having learned from Akebare that he's the groom chosen for Neala, reveals his origins to Neala. Neala agrees to elope with him after they have celebrated their wedding.

Zarete, upon learning the wedding is taking place, breaks into the temple, demanding equality between Pariahs and Brahmins. He is sentenced to death by Akebare, and Idamore is forced to reveal to everyone that he is the son of a Pariah. Akebare in his fury sentences Idamore to death as well, and Neala begs her father for mercy to no avail. She opts to join them in "a horrible, atrocious death", while Akebare rejoices "Mine is the kingdom! Mine is the empire! I couldn’t yearn for more!", as he can take possession of the empire when Idamore is dead.

== Recordings ==
Year	Cast (Neala, Idamore, Akebare, Zarete, Zaide, Empsaele)	Conductor, Opera House and Orchestra	Label
2001	Patrizia Cigna, Filippo Pina Castiglioni, Alessandro Verducci, Marcin Bronikowski, Nara Montefusco, Andrea Bragiotto	Marco Berdondini, Orchestra "Pro Arte" Marche and the Coro Lirico Mezio Agostini (Recorded live 6–8 April 2001 at Teatro Masini in Faenza, Italy)	Audio CD: Bongiovanni; Cat: GB 2300/1-2
2021	Marco Mimica, Albina Shagimuratova, Misha Kiria, René Barbera, Thomas Atkins, Kathryn Rudge	Sir Mark Elder, Britten Sinfonia	Audio CD: Opera Rara ORC60
