= Il giovedì grasso =

Opera by Gaetano Donizetti

- Farsa by Gaetano Donizetti
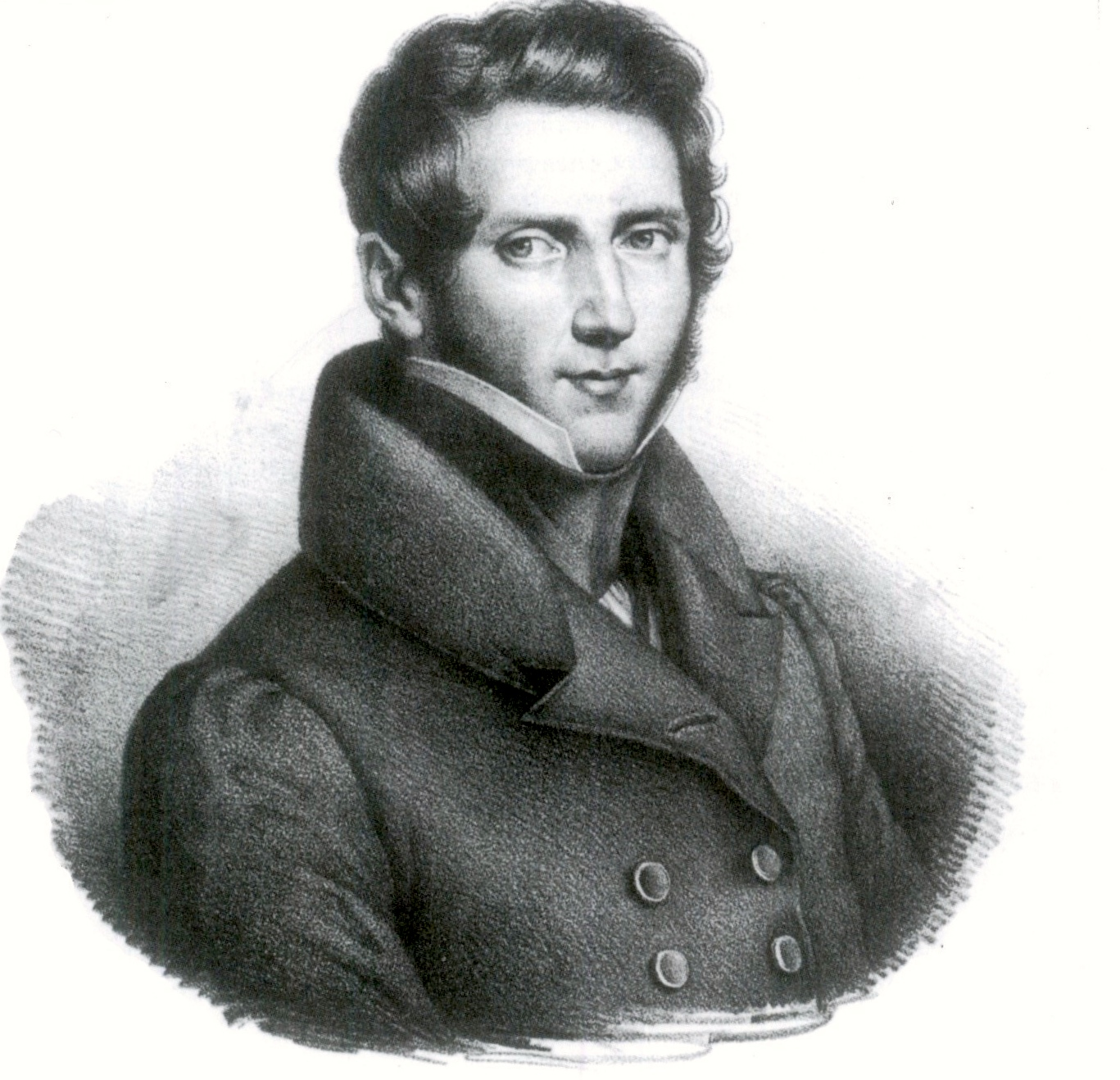
- The young composer
- Librettist: Domenico Gilardoni
- Language: Italian
- Based on: Monsieur de Pourceaugnac by Molière and Le nouveau Pourceaugnac by Charles-Gaspard Delestre-Poirson and Eugène Scribe
- Premiere: 26 February 1829; Teatro del Fondo, Naples

Il giovedì grasso is a farsa in one act by Gaetano Donizetti, from a libretto by Domenico Gilardoni. The literal translation of the title is "Fat Thursday", a reference to Carnival celebration. The libretto was adapted from the French comedies Monsieur de Pourceaugnac by Molière and Le nouveau Pourceaugnac by Charles-Gaspard Delestre-Poirson and Eugène Scribe. The opera uses spoken dialogue rather than recitatives, and the buffo role is given in the Neapolitan language. The work premiered at the Teatro del Fondo in Naples on 26 February 1829.

== Roles ==
Role	Voice type	Premiere Cast, 26 February 1829 (Conductor: )
Ernesto Rousignac	tenor	Giovanni Battista Rubini
Stefanina	soprano	Rosalinda Grossi
Nina	contralto	Adelaide Comelli-Rubini
Sigismondo	bass	Luigi Lablache
The Colonel	baritone	Giovanni Battista Campagnoli
Teodoro	tenor	Giovanni Arrigotti
Camilla	mezzo-soprano	Maria Carraro
Cola	bass	Giovanni Pace

== Synopsis ==
Time: 17th century
Place: "A house in the country, outside Paris"

The lovers Nina and Teodoro are in despair since Nina is promised to another man, Ernesto. Their friend Sigismondo (who is mistakenly jealous of his wife Camilla) concocts a scheme to help the lovers. Inspired by Molière's Monsieur de Pourceaugnac, Sigismondo proposes that he and his wife will dress up as on "Fat Thursday". Then they will play tricks on Ernesto, whom they believe to be a mere simpleton, so that he will flee in confusion. Sigismondo will pose as a friend from Ernesto's past, and Camilla, as a former lover betrayed by Ernesto. When Ernesto arrives, he happens to learn of the scheme, and decides to turn the tables on the others. Pretending to be deceived, he treats Sigismondo as an old friend and treats Camilla as his former lover, which confirms Sigismondo in his misplaced suspicions. Only when Nina's father the Colonel is back does Ernesto confess to everyone that he, the supposed simpleton, has outwitted them. Ernesto consents to the wedding of Nina and Teodoro, Sigismondo promises never to be jealous again, and all praise the carnival season.

== Recordings ==
Year	Cast (The Colonel, Nina, Teodoro, Sigismondo)	Conductor, Opera House and Orchestra	Label
1970	Federico Davià, Jill Gomez, Malcolm Williams, Elfego Esparza	David Atherton, Radio Teflis Éireann Symphony Orchestra (A recording of a performance at the Wexford Festival)	Audio CD: Foyer; Cat: 1-CF 2036, Memories; Cat: HR 4482
1971	Saturno Meletti, Mariella Devia, Antonio Bevacqua, Giorgio Gatti	Ottavio Ziino, Orchestra Aidem di Firenze	33rpm LP: Voce; Cat: 110

1961 James Loomis (bass), Bruna Rizzoli (sop), Rodolfo Malacarne (ten), Nestore Catalani (bar), Orchestra della Radiotelevisione della Svizzera Italiana (Edwin Loehrer) Audio CD Nuovo Era (Membran) 232585 (released 2009)
