= L'esule di Roma =

Opera by Gaetano Donizetti

- Opera by Gaetano Donizetti
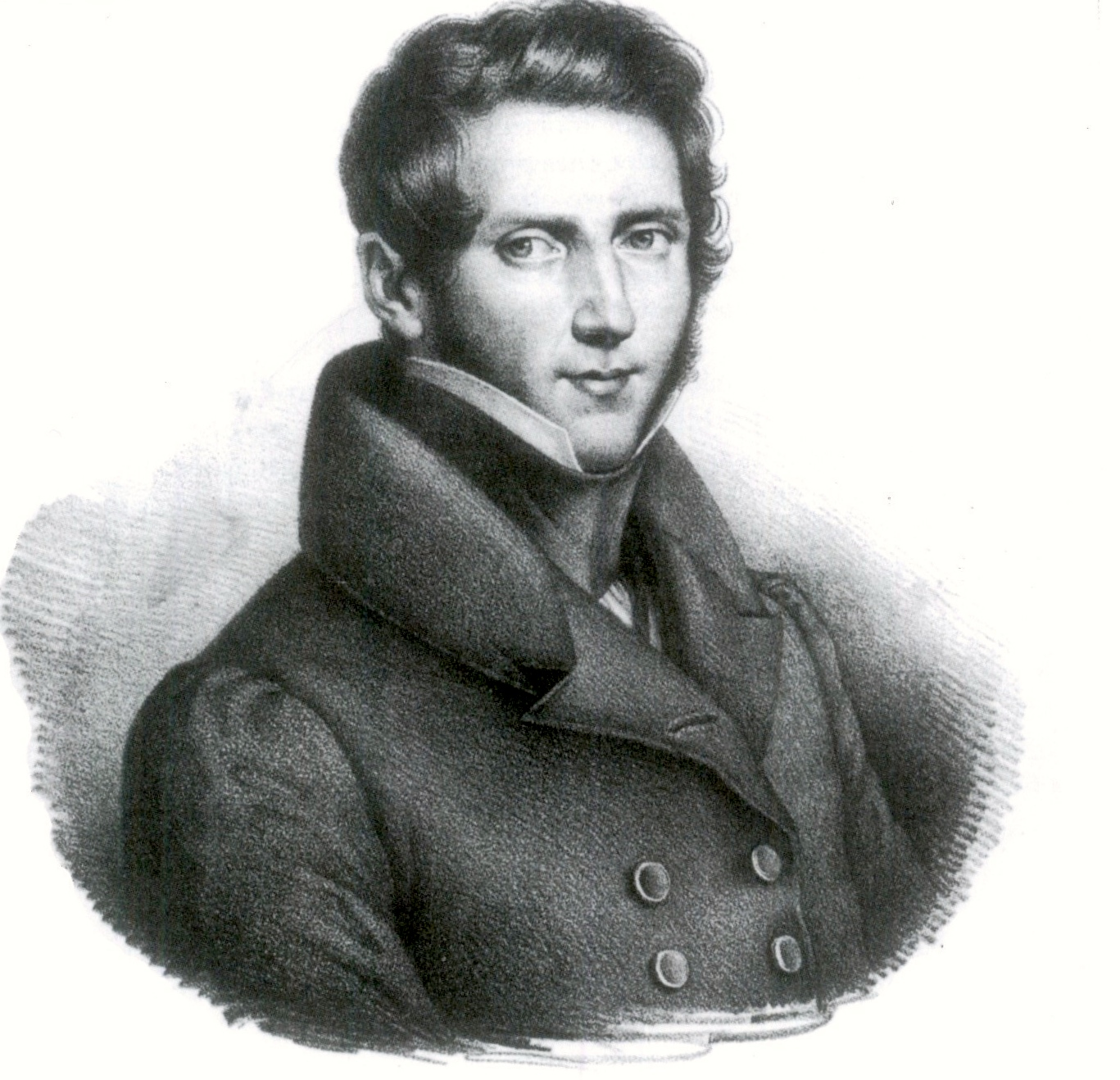
- The young composer
- Librettist: Domenico Gilardoni
- Language: Italian
- Based on: Luigi Marchionni's Il proscritto romano
- Premiere: 1 January 1828; Teatro San Carlo, Naples

L'esule di Roma, ossia Il proscritto (The Exile from Rome, or the Proscribed Man) is a melodramma eroico, or heroic opera, in two acts by Gaetano Donizetti. Domenico Gilardoni wrote the Italian libretto after Luigi Marchionni's Il proscritto romano, in its turn based on Louis-Charles Caigniez and Debotière's Androclès ou Le lion reconnaissant. It premiered on 1 January 1828 at the Teatro San Carlo, Naples.

== Composition history ==
In 1827, Donizetti was hired by the Neapolitan theatrical impresario Domenico Barbaja to compose four operas in three years. Fulfilling his obligations on time and shortly after giving the New Theatre the theatrical farce Le convenienze ed inconvenienze teatrali on 21 November 1827, he presented a new work to the Teatro San Carlo for the New Year of 1828, this time in the genre of opera seria as L'esule di Roma.

The libretto by Domenico Gilardoni was inspired by the drama of the prosecutor Luigi Marchionni, The Exiled Roman, or The Lion of the Caucasus (Naples, 1820), which in its turn was based on an opera in three acts by Louis-Charles Caigniez, Androclès reconnaissant ou le Lion (Paris, 1804), which later provided the inspiration for George Bernard Shaw's Androcles and the Lion (1912).

The premiere united an impressive cast such as the tenor Calvari Berardo Winter, the soprano Adelaide Torsi and the bass Luigi Lablache, and it was a triumph.

== Performance history ==
19th century

The opera was immediately taken to other Italian opera houses: La Scala in Milan with the soprano Henriette Meric-Lalande in July 1828 and again in Naples with the tenor Giovanni Battista Rubini in the winter of 1828.

After the first performances in the nineteenth century, the work was subjected to several changes: among the cuts was the scene in which Septimus was spared by a lion whose wound he had healed and who recognized him in the Circus Maximus. This was an episode from an anecdote about Androcles reported by Aulus Gellius, who had attributed it to Apion: it was replaced by a much more conventional device, Tiberius's clemency. The final scene in which Argelia rejoices in the happy outcome had also been added to respect the conventions of the time and to help Donizetti who, in accordance with the tradition of the day, wanted the work to end with an aria for the prima donna.

L'esule di Roma was the work chosen by Donizetti's birthplace of Bergamo to honor the composer in 1840: it was directed by Donizetti's childhood friend, Marco Bones, with a cast that included first class singers such as Eugenia Tadolini, Domenico Donzelli and Ignazio Marini. The work was brought to the stage in Madrid, Vienna and London and remained in the repertoire in Italy and abroad until 1869, the year when it was given last performance in the nineteenth century in Naples.

20th century and beyond

L'esule di Roma was staged for the first time in the twentieth century on 18 July 1982 at the Queen Elizabeth Hall in London, in a concert performance with Katia Ricciarelli, Bruce Brewer and John-Paul Bogart, on the initiative of the Donizetti Society. The first performance in modern Italy was at the Teatro Gabriel Chiabrera in Savona in October 1986 and it was recorded live.

== Roles ==
| Role | Voice type | Premiere Cast, 1 January 1828 (Conductor: - ) |
|---|---|---|
| Murena, a senator | Baritone | Luigi Lablache |
| Argelia, his daughter | soprano | Adelaide Tosi |
| Emilia, Argelia's younger sister | silent | |
| Settimio, a tribune | tenor | Berardo Winter |
| Leontina, Argelia's friend | mezzo-soprano | Edvige Ricci |
| Publio, a general | baritone | Giovanni Campagnoli |
| Lucio | tenor | Gaetano Chizzola |
| Fulvio | tenor | Capranica |
Murena's kinsmen, friends of Publio, Argelia's slaves, soldiers, clergymen, prisoners, people

== Synopsis ==
Place: Rome
Time: The reign of Tiberius, (14-37 AD)

=== Act 1 ===
==== First scene ====
A public square surrounded by palaces, temples and monuments. The Arch of Triumph. On the right, the vestibulum of Murena's house

Scene 1

The people of Rome hails General Publius, who defeated the enemies of the Emperor Tiberius, but the senator Murena did not appear to participate the general exultation. In fact, he has promised his daughter to Publius Argelia, but when he arrives to claim her, he is forced to admit that the young girl can not be found and he can not fully conceal his concern.

Scene 2

The reason for Argelia's disappearance is revealed: The young tribune Septimus, son of one of Murena's benefactor's, that Murena condemned and exiled for political reasons, has returned secretly, risking certain death, to find Argelia, with whom he is in love (cabaletta Se ad altri il core).

Scene 3

Argelia returns love to him too, and has remained faithful (duet Al fianco mio!).

Scene 4

The two lovers' happiness is short-lived: Lucius comes with his soldiers and arrests Septimius immediately.

Scene 5

Argelia confesses that she loves Publius Septimius: Publius, nobly, promises to help him.

Scene 6

Lucio Murena announces that Septimus is back and that is expected to be judged by the Senate.

==== Second scene ====
Inside Murena's house.

Scene 7

Septimus makes one last visit to Argelia and provides written evidence of the conspiracy of which he is victim and of which his own father is the main inspiration. Argelia is terrified by the news. Murena comes in full of pain because he has just condemned Septimus to death. He implores the latter, however, not to tell his daughter about it and in return suggests that to save his honor he's ready to make him escape from Rome along with Argelia. But Septimus refuses and is ready to meet his death. Unusually, Donizetti concludes Act 1 with a remarkable trio (Ei stesso!), Instead of the usual custom; this solution will be taken up by Bellini's Norma at end of Act 1 (1831) and Verdi's Ernani of 1844.

=== Act 2 ===
==== First scene ====
Inside Murena's house.

Scenes 1 and 2:

Murena sinks into madness in a very beautiful scene (aria Entra nel cirfo!, Cabaletta De Stige il flutto), which, on one hand oddly foreshadows his famous "mad scenes" - all for women - the works of the mature Donizetti, and on the other hand is echoed particularly in scenes from the masterpieces of the neoclassical theater, where a male character becomes insane by remorse, among them can mentioned the tragedies Saul (1782) by Vittorio Alfieri and Aristodemo (1786) by Vincenzo Monti. Giovanni Pacini will mention this scene in his Sappho (1840).

==== Second scene ====
In prison

Scene 3

In his cell, Septimius awaits his execution. The aria in A major S'io finora, Bell'idol mio is preceded by an instrumental passage for Oboe solo and followed by a cabaletta in the same key, goes down to the trumpet. This scene was added during the performances at La Scala, Milan on 12 July 12, 1828 for the tenor, Winter, but the original music was lost. There are two versions: one written for Rubini, who sang the role at the Teatro San Carlo in the winter of 1828 and the other for Ignazio Pasini on its revival in Bergamo, 1840.

==== Third scene ====
The garden of Murena's house.

Scenes 4 and 5

Murena has decided to denounce himself for the sake of saving Septimus. He asks from Argelia the documents that the young man has given her that proves his guilt, but she doesn't want her father to sacrifice his good name, and refuses him with tears. However, Murena's decision is irrevocable, and he goes to the emperor.

Scene 6

Outside, Argelia hears the cries of the crowd that wants to see Septimus taken to his execution. The cantabile of his cavatina Tardi, tardi il piè la volgi is introduced and emphasized quite unusually with an English horn.

Scene 7

The tempo in the middle is introduced by Publius, who announces the good news: Septimus and Murena were both pardoned. Argelia expresses her joy in the final cabaletta Ogni tormento.

== Music ==
The main numbers of the score are Murena's first aria Ahi! Che di calma un'ombra and his duet with Publius (Act 1, scene 1), the Septimus and Argelia's duet (Act 1, scene 3), the final trio of the act 1, for which the work owes much of its popularity in the nineteenth century, the Murena's mad scene in Act 2 and the duet between Argelia and Murena, also in act 2. The music is still much affected by the opera seria influence, the classic example of which is Rossini's Semiramide of 1823, although the instrumental passages with the accompaniment of English horn or bassoon obbligato and extensive scenes altogether often make us think about Donizetti's old master, Simon Mayr, or even of Gaspare Spontini's The Vestal (1803). However, the dramatic intensity of the situations, as well as Donizetti's typical use of the flute and the attempt to remove the final prima donna's aria already announced the composer's mature works.

== Recordings ==
| Year | Cast (Argelia, Settimio, Murena, Publio) | Conductor, Opera House and Orchestra | Label |
|---|---|---|---|
| 1982 | Katia Ricciarelli, Bruce Brewer, John-Paul Bogart, John Gibbs | Leslie Head, Pro Opera Orchestra and Chelsea Opera Group Chorus (Recording of a performance at Queen Elizabeth Hall in London) | Cassette: Charles Handelman, Live Opera; Cat: 03309 |
| 1986 | Cecilia Gasdia, Ernesto Palacio, Simone Alaimo, Armando Ariostini | Massimo de Bernart, Orchestra Sinfonica di Piacenza and the chorus of the Opera Giocosa (Recording of a performance in the Teatro Chiabrera, Savona, 14 October) | Audio CD: Bongiovanni; Cat: GB 2045/46-2 |
