= Dalinda =

Dalinda may refer to:

- Dalinda, an opera by Gaetano Donizetti
- Dalinda, a major role in Handel's Ariodante
- Dalinda, a major role in John Dryden's Love Triumphant 1694
- Dalinda, a minor role in Cavalli's opera La virtù de' strali d'Amore
- Dalinda, singer in Mandragora
- Dalinda, a 1749 novel by Eliza Haywood
- "Dalinda", a song by Alex Mica
