= Bianca e Fernando =

1828 opera by Vincenzo Bellini

- Opera by Vincenzo Bellini (Revised version of Bianca e Gernando)
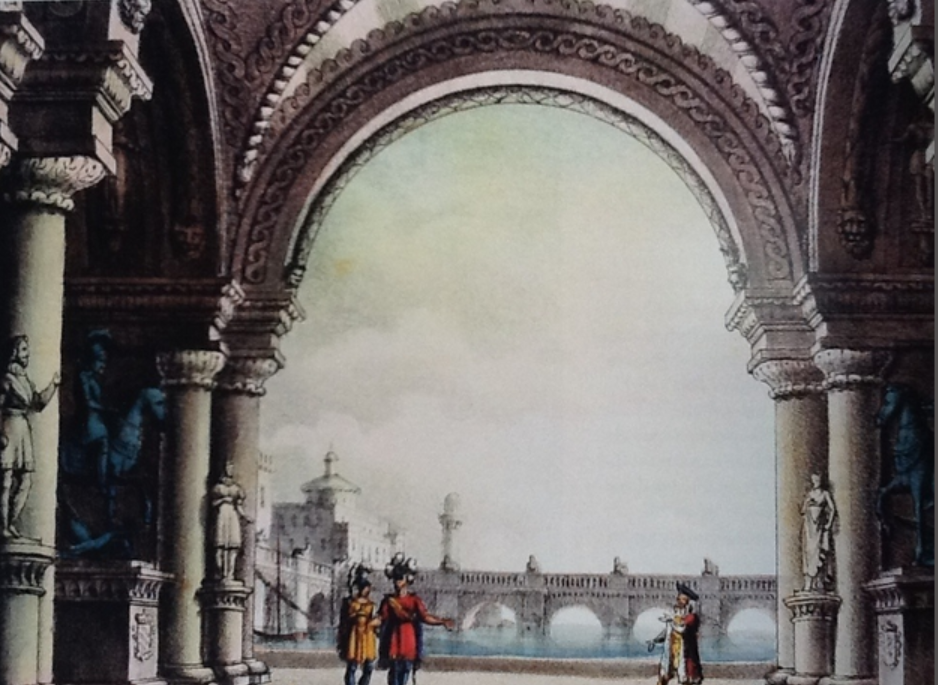
- Set design for act 1, scene 1 (Alessandro Sanquirico, 1828)
- Librettist: Felice Romani, providing revisions from the original by Domenico Gilardoni
- Language: Italian
- Based on: Carlo Roti's play Bianca e Fernando alla tomba di Carlo IV, duca di Agrigento
- Premiere: 7 April 1828; Teatro Carlo Felice, Genoa

Bianca e Fernando (Bianca and Fernando) is an opera in two acts by Vincenzo Bellini.

The original version of this opera was presented as Bianca e Gernando and was set to a libretto by Domenico Gilardoni, based on Bianca e Fernando alla tomba di Carlo IV, duca di Agrigento (Bianca and Ferdinand at the Tomb of Charles IV, Duke of Agrigento), a play by Carlo Roti which is set in Sicily. In 1826, use of the name Fernando in the title was forbidden because Ferdinando was the name of the heir to the throne, and no form of it could be used on a royal stage.

The 1826 work—Bellini's first professionally staged opera—had its first performance at the Teatro di San Carlo in Naples on 30 May 1826. Its success resulted in the offer to the young composer from Domenico Barbaia, the intendente at the San Carlo and also part of the management of La Scala opera house in Milan, of a commission to write a new opera for La Scala.

The revival of Bianca e Gernando, with the title reverting to the original one proposed for the opera, came about after the success of Il pirata in Milan in October 1827. A commission came from Genoa in early 1828, too late for Bellini to write anything new. However, he did re-arrange the music to suit the singers' voices and in addition (as Galatopoulos states), Romani took on the re-construction of the libretto with the result that "out of the whole of Bianca, the only pieces entirely unchanged are the big duet and the romanza; everything else is altered, and about half of it is new". For this later production, Bellini specifically rejected a request by Gilardoni to revise the libretto, preferring instead Felice Romani, whom he regarded as the superior poet.

== Performance history ==
The first version, given as Bianca e Gernando, premiered at the Teatro di San Carlo in Naples on 30 May 1826 with Henriette Méric-Lalande and Giovanni Battista Rubini in the title roles. The revised version, given under its original title, Bianca e Fernando, took place on the occasion of the opening of the new Teatro Carlo Felice in Genoa on 7 April 1828. It was performed again in the 1829 Autumn season at La Scala in a production designed by Alessandro Sanquirico with Méric-Lalande and Rubini reprising the title roles.

Two years after Bellini's death, the opera was revived at Rome's Teatro Valle on 31 July 1837 with Leonilde Franceschini-Rossi and Cirillo Antognini in the title roles. The reception was mixed with the critic for Il pirata wondering why it had even been resurrected. Antonio Tosi writing in Rivista Teatrale di Roma had praise for the leading singers, but contrasted Bianca e Fernando with Bellini's mature works, writing that in this early opera Bellini had

followed the method of those numerous servile imitators of the Rossinian style who, lacking that master's genius and distinction, remained unaware that in the fine arts, not copies, but creations are wanted, not imitations, but originality.

The opera has been rarely performed in modern times. It was revived in a staged performance in Genoa in 1978 with Cristina Deutekom and Werner Hollweg in the title roles and given a concert performance in London in 1981. The first version of the opera, Bianca e Gernando, was given in concert form by the Rossini in Wildbad festival in the summer of 2016. A live recording exists of the latter production, as well as of two previous performances of the second version.

== Roles ==
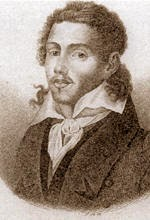
Tenor Giovanni David

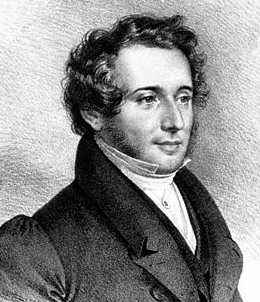
Baritone Antonio Tamburini

Roles, voice types, premiere cast
| Role | Voice type | Premiere cast, Bianca e Gernando, 30 May 1826 | Premiere cast, Bianca e Fernando, 7 April 1828 |
|---|---|---|---|
| Bianca | soprano | Henriette Méric-Lalande | Adelaide Tosi |
| Fernando | tenor | Giovanni Battista Rubini | Giovanni David |
| Carlo, Duke d'Agrigento, father of Bianco and Fernando | bass | Arcangelo Berrettoni | Giuseppe Rossi |
| Filippo | bass (modern-day baritone) | Luigi Lablache | Antonio Tamburini |
| Clemente | bass | Michele Benedetti | Agostino Rovere |
| Viscardo | mezzo-soprano | Almerinda Manzocchi | Elisabetta Coda |
| Uggero | tenor | Gaetano Chizzola | Antonio Crippa |
| Eloisa | mezzo-soprano | Elisa Manzocchi | Marietta Riva |

== Synopsis ==
Place: Agrigento
Late 14th/15th century

Background The ambitious Filippo has secretly imprisoned Carlo, Duke of Agrigento and usurped his throne. Carlo's son Fernando was accordingly forced into exile although he was still only a child. Carlo's daughter, Bianca, the widow of the Duke of Messina, unaware of Filippo's plots agrees to become his wife. Fernando, now an adult, returns home with a desire to avenge his father, who he thinks is dead.

=== Act 1 ===
Using a false name and pretending to be a soldier of fortune, Fernando comes to the palace of Agrigento and offers his services to the new Duke. He convinces Viscardo, a follower of Filippo, that he saw Fernando die and Filippo receives this news with joy. He hires Fernando without hesitation, thinking of entrusting the task of killing Carlo to him.

Bianca comes to the palace to meet her prospective bridegroom. Here she meets Fernando, but after so many years, she does not recognize him. Indeed, she suspects him. Fernando, for his part, is convinced that his sister is an accomplice of the usurper.

=== Act 2 ===
Filippo orders Fernando go to the prison to kill Carlo. At the same time, he announces his approaching wedding to Bianca. The old and trusted henchman of Fernando, Clemente, informs Bianca that Fernando wants to see her and brother and sister finally meet face to face. But when they recognize each other, Fernando tells Bianca of Filippo's plots. Together, they go to the prison to free Carlo, followed by Fernando's companions in arms. Filippo also arrives at the palace, bringing with him Bianca's infant son whom he threatens to kill if Fernando will not give himself up. But the trusty Clemente disarms him, and the tyrant is finally ousted.

== Recordings ==
| Year | Cast: (Bianca, Fernando, Filippo, Carlo) | Conductor, opera house and orchestra | Label |
|---|---|---|---|
| 1976 | Yasuko Hayashi, Antonio Savastano, Enrico Fissore, Mario Macchi | Gabriele Ferro, RAI Turin Orchestra and Chorus | CD: Opera d'Oro; Cat: OPD 1419 |
| 1991 | Young Ok Shin, Gregory Kunde, Haijing Fu, Aurio Tomicich | Andrea Licata, Teatro Massimo Bellini, Orchestra and Chorus, Catania, (Audio and video recordings of a performance (or of performances) at Catania Bellini Festival) | CD: Live Opera; Unnumbered; DVD: House of Opera, Cat: DVDCC 247 |
| 2017 | Silvia Dalla Benetta, Maxim Mironov, Vittorio Prato, Luca Dall'Amico | Antonino Fogliani, Camerata Bach Choir Poznan, Virtuosi Brunensis | CD: Naxos Opera; Cat: 8.660417-18 |
| 2021 | Salome Jicia, Giorgio Missero, Nicola Ulivieri, Alessio Cacciamani, Giovanni Battista Parodi, Elena Belfiore, Carlotta Vichi, Antonio Mannarino | Donato Renzetti, Orchestra e Coro dell'Opera Carlo Felice, Genova | CD: Dynamic; Cat: CDS7954.02 |
