= Il borgomastro di Saardam =

Opera by Gaetano Donizetti

- Opera buffa by Gaetano Donizetti
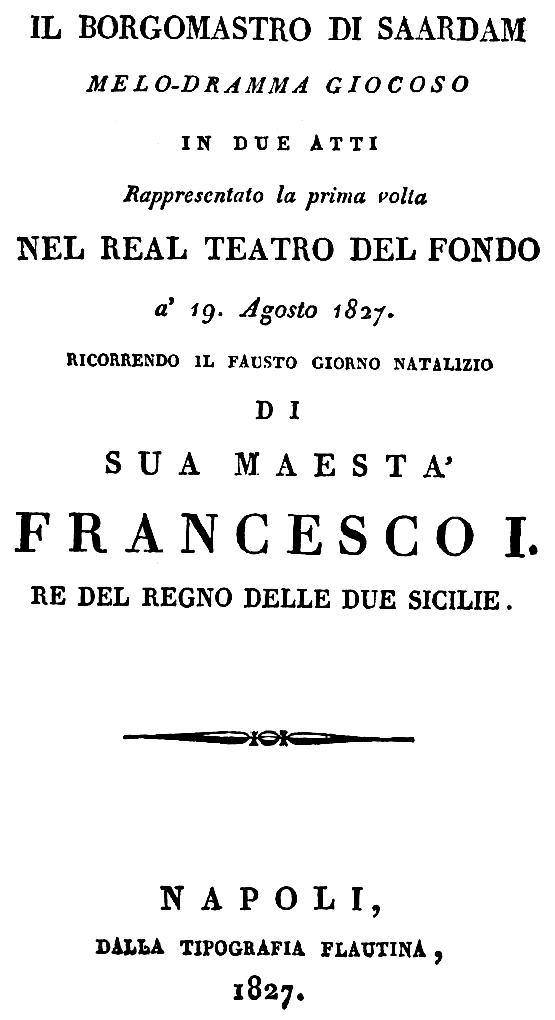
- Cover of the libretto
- Librettist: Domenico Gilardoni
- Language: Italian
- Based on: Le bourgmestre de Sardam by Mélesville and others
- Premiere: 19 August 1827; Teatro del Fondo, Naples

Il borgomastro di Saardam (The mayor of Saardam) is an 1827 melodramma giocoso (opera buffa) in two acts by Gaetano Donizetti. The libretto, by Domenico Gilardoni, was based on the 1818 play Le bourgmestre de Sardam, ou Les deux Pierres by Mélesville, Jean-Toussaint Merle and Eugène Cantiran de Boirie. Albert Lortzing's 1837 opera Zar und Zimmermann is ultimately based, via a German translation, on the same French play. The plot concerns a famous episode in the life of Peter the Great, in which he disguised himself under an assumed name as a worker in the shipyards of Saardam, and has certain similarities to Donizetti's earlier 1-act farce Il falegname di Livonia.

== Performance history ==
19th century

The opera premiered at the Teatro del Fondo in Naples on 19 August 1827. The lead soprano role of Marietta was composed for prima donna Caroline Unger, who received high praise. The opera itself had a slow start, but soon the Neapolitans loved it, for Donizetti was very popular in that city; it was still in the repertoire the following year and achieved more than thirty-five performances. However, when the opera was staged at the Teatro alla Scala in Milan on 2 January 1828, and in Rome in June, it completely failed, receiving but a single performance in each city. Its Milan failure pleased Donizetti's younger competitor, Vincenzo Bellini, whose Il pirata had won great critical and popular acclaim in Milan in October of the previous year.

20th century and beyond

The opera was also produced in Barcelona (1829), Vienna (1836), Berlin (1837), and Budapest (1839), but was then ignored until 1973, when it was staged in the town of its setting, now called Zaandam, where it received nine performances and was recorded.

== Roles ==
Roles, voice types, premiere cast
Role	Voice type	Premiere cast, (Note: The cast list and role names are based on Gilardoni 1827 with full names from Ashbrook 1982, pp. 542–543, and Casaglia 2005. Ashbrook and Casaglia both say that Carlo Casaccia sang the borgomastro (mayor) and his son Raffaele Casaccia (also a bass-baritone) sang the role of Timoteo. These roles are one and the same in Gilardoni's libretto. According to Timms 1992, p. 750, Carlo Casaccia made his last appearance at the Teatro del Fondo in 1826.) 19 August 1827 Conductor: Nicola Festa
The Tsar (Peter the Great), disguised as Pietro Mikailoff	baritone	Celestino Salvatori
Pietro Flimann, a carpenter from Russia	tenor	Berardo Calvari Winter
Timoteo Spaccafronna, the mayor (Note: The mayor's name is Vambett in the 1833 libretto from Turin: Gilardoni 1833, p. 3; and in the 1973 recording, OCLC 313616322.)	bass	Raffaele Casaccia
Marietta, daughter of the mayor	soprano	Carolina Ungher
Carlotta, foster girl in the mayor's house	mezzo-soprano	Almerinda Manzocchi
Leforte, disguised as Filiberto, confidant of the Tsar	bass	Giovanni Pace
Ali' Mahmed, gatekeeper	bass	Gaetano Chizzola
An official	bass	Capranica
Chorus: Carpenters and farmers, mayoral guard, Dutch and Turkish soldiers

== Historical background ==
Peter the Great was the tsar of Russia between 1672 and 1725. After his mother's death in 1694, he made a series of crucial reforms for Russia that in consequence became a great power. As part of this endeavor in 1697 he went on a diplomatic mission to Western Europe. In August he was incognito in Zaandam (Saardam) in order to study the Dutch shipbuilding and wind powered industries. Here he rented a small house near the shipyards from a Dutch smith who had worked in Moscow. His anonymity only lasted a few days, and he left for Amsterdam, leaving a number of his party behind to learn the trades. During the five months in Holland he interacted most extensively with Nicolaes Witsen, the mayor of Amsterdam, who was an expert on both Russian affairs and on shipbuilding.

In 1703, Peter the Great founded Saint Petersburg and in 1712 he married his second wife, a peasant of Livonia who succeeded the throne under the name of Catherine I. In 1717 he revisited Holland, and in March and August visited Zaandam again, this time accompanied by Catherine.

== Synopsis ==
Place: Saardam, Holland
Time: end of the 17th century

Peter the Great pretends to be a carpenter in shipyards in Saardam and works with the Russian defector Flimann. Flimann is in humble condition and is desperate to marry Marietta, the daughter of the mayor. The mayor, knowing that the Tsar has come to town in disguise, becomes convinced that Flimann is Peter the Great. Meanwhile, the true tsar is called home to quell a revolt and has to reveal his true identity. Before leaving, he gives Flimann a high title, which will enable him to marry his Marietta.

== Recordings ==
Year	Cast: Marietta, Tsar Pietro, Pietro Flimann, Il Borgomastro	Conductor, opera house and orchestra	Label
1973	Ans Philippo, Pieter van den Berg, Philip Langridge, Renato Capecchi	Jan Schaap, Orchestra and chorus of the Zaanstad Opera (Recording of a performance at Zaanstad)	CD: Living Stage; Cat: LS 1104; Myto Records, Cat: 2MCD 991.202
2018	Irina Dubrovskaya, Giorgio Caoduro, Juan Francisco Gatell, Andrea Concetti	Roberto Rizzi Brignoli, Donizetti Opera orchestra and chorus	CD:Dynamic; Cat:CDS7812
