= Luigia Boccabadati =

Italian operatic soprano

Luigia Boccabadati (1800 – 12 October 1850) was an Italian operatic soprano.

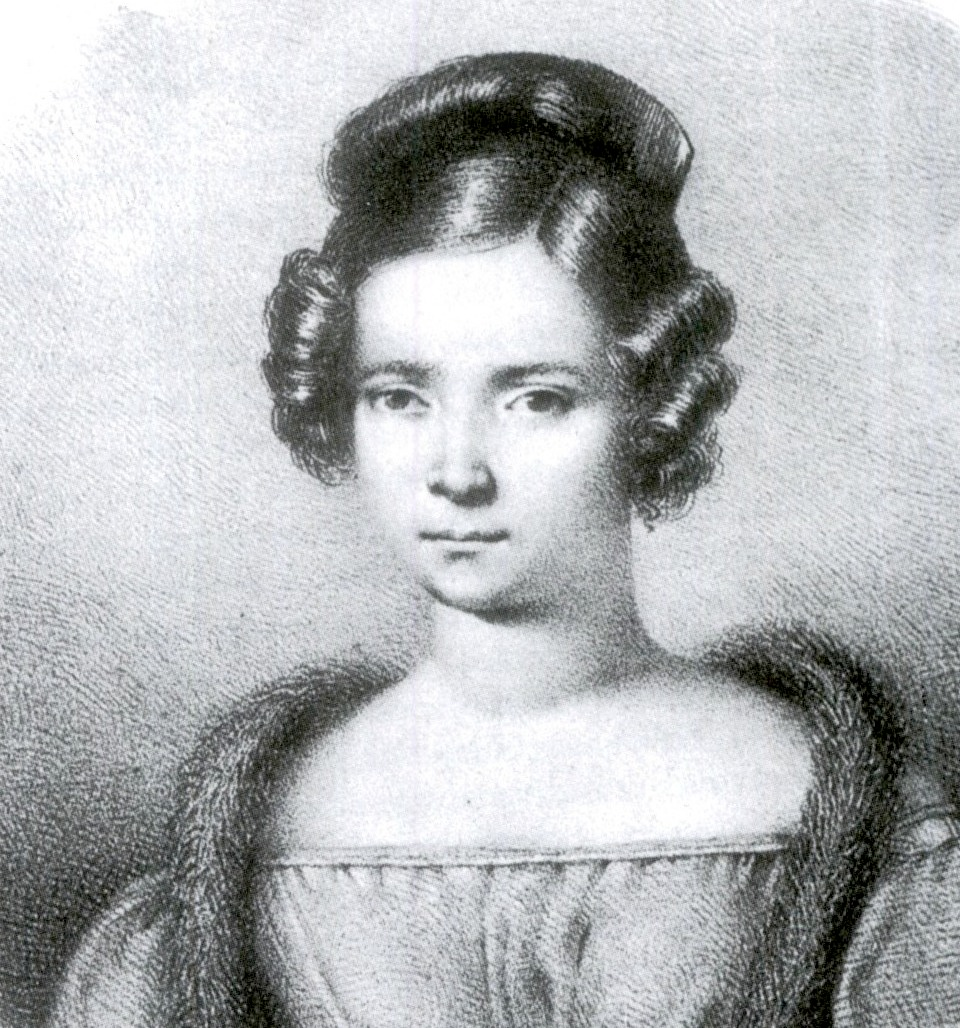
Luigia Boccabadati

Born in Modena, Boccabadati made her professional opera debut at the Teatro Regio in Parma in 1817. She then appeared in opera houses in Venice and Rome. She performed the roles of Giulietta in Nicola Vaccai's Giulietta e Romeo and the title heroine in Giacomo Meyerbeer's Margherita d'Anjou at La Scala in 1826. She went on to appear in five world premiere in operas by Gaetano Donizetti in Naples, singing Amelia in Il castello di Kenilworth (1829), Sela in Il diluvio universale (1830), Cristina in I pazzi per progetto (1830), the title role in Francesca di Foix (1831), and Chiarina in La romanziera e l'uomo nero (1831). She retired from the stage in 1844 and died in Turin six years later at the age of 50.

Her daughters Augusta (1821?–1875) and Virginia (1828–1922) were also well-known sopranos.
