= Antonio Tamburini =

Italian opera singer (1800–1876)

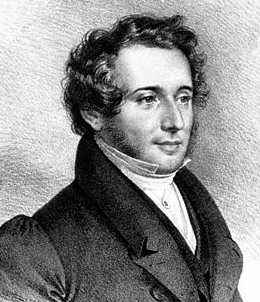
Antonio Tamburini

Antonio Tamburini (28 March 1800 – 8 November 1876) was an Italian operatic baritone.

== Biography ==
Born in Faenza, then part of the Papal States, Tamburini studied the orchestral horn with his father and voice with Aldobrando Rossi, before making his debut as a singer, aged 18, in La contessa di colle erbose (Pietro Generali). He went on to become one of the finest baritones of his age. He had a beautiful, smooth and flexible voice the quality of which is indicated by the bel canto music written for him. Castil-Blaze described his voice in The Harmonicon of May 1833:

His voice is a fine baritone, well defined, extending from A to F, occasionally reaching G#, and sometimes descending to Gb. I might have allotted to him the two full octaves without reserve, but I prefer to retrench the semitone, above and below, that I may give to his voice and tone the full praise it merits. It is round, rich, and clear, of wonderful flexibility, and such astonishing firmness, that it is impossible to suspect any note is passed over unperceived. He has the neatness and precision of execution that Ber and Barizel have acquired on the clarionet or bassoon. The tone is equal in its whole extent, taking and holding F# with as much ease as a tenor voice would do, or running over the notes with a vivacity unheard of till now.

However, it is apparent from several comments in the English and Irish press that, certainly by 1847, he had acquired a more persistent vibrato. For example, the Hampshire Telegraph noted in April 1847 that "Tamburini’s voice exhibits some of the effects of time for his upper notes have lost power, and the tremulousness, which was always his defect, has increased".

He was renowned also for his good looks and impressive stage presence, often working with the tenor Giovanni Battista Rubini and soprano Giulia Grisi. All three were mentioned in Gustave Flaubert's Madame Bovary.

Tamburini is famous for his association with the operas of Bellini such as I Puritani. Indeed, he was one of the so-called "Puritani Quartet" of leading international singers, along with Grisi, Rubini and the bass Luigi Lablache. The quartet was reunited on stage, albeit with Giovanni Mario replacing Rubini, in 1843 at the premiere of Donizetti's Don Pasquale.

A particular favourite with London and Paris audiences, Tamburini was married to the contralto Marietta Gioia-Tamburini. They often sang together.

He died in Nice in 1876, aged 76.

== Roles created by Antonio Tamburini ==
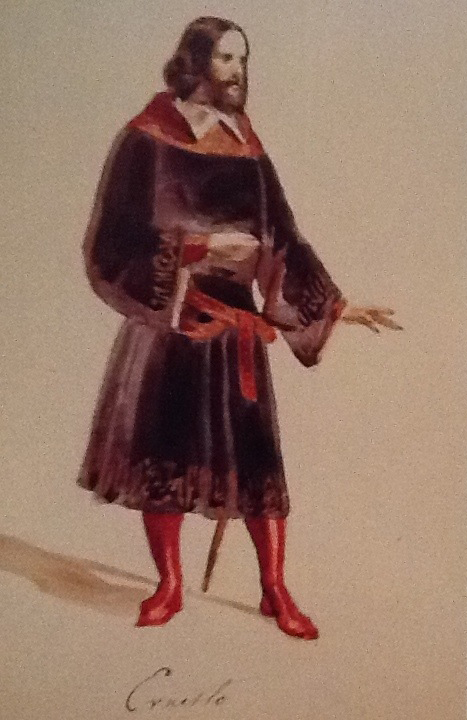
Antonio Tamburini as Ernesto in Il Pirata 1827

- 1820 Mercadante: Violenza e Costanza (Atlante)
- 1822 Mercadante: Adele ed Emerico (Generale Banner)
- 1822 Donizetti: Chiara e Serafina (Picaro)
- 1824 Donizetti: L'ajo nell'imbarazzo (Don Giulio)
- 1826 Donizetti: Alahor in Granata (title role)
- 1827 Bellini: Il pirata (Ernesto)
- 1828 Donizetti: Alina, regina di Golconda (Volmar)
- 1828 Donizetti: Gianni di Calais (Rustano)
- 1828 Bellini: Bianca e Fernando (Filippo)
- 1829 Pacini: Il talismano (Riccardo Cuor di Leone)
- 1829 Bellini: La straniera (Valdeburgo)
- 1830 Donizetti: Imelda de' Lambertazzi (Bonifacio)
- 1831 Mercadante: Zaira (Orosmane)
- 1831 Donizetti: Francesca di Foix (il Re)
- 1831 Donizetti: La romanzesca e l'uomo nero (Filidoro)
- 1831 Coccia: Edoardo Stuart in Scozia (title role)
- 1832 Donizetti: Fausta (Costantino)
- 1835 Donizetti: Marin Faliero (Israele Bertucci)
- 1835 Bellini: I Puritani (Riccardo)
- 1836 Mercadante: I briganti (Hermann)
- 1843 Donizetti: Don Pasquale (Malatesta)
