= Domenico Gilardoni =

Italian opera librettist

Domenico Gilardoni (1798–1831) was an Italian opera librettist, most well known for his collaborations with the composers Vincenzo Bellini (his first work) and Gaetano Donizetti.

== Biography ==
Gilardoni was born in Naples, but little is known about his early life and training. He died early, and thus had a short career, but wrote more than 20 librettos in five years, all for Naples.

Most of his early work was for the Teatro Nuovo, where his librettos contained much prose and often included comic roles in Neapolitan dialect. His first published libretto was Bianca e Gernando for Bellini. It was based on a play, which was probably selected by Bellini, Carlo Roti's Bianca e Fernando alla tomba di Carlo IV, Duca d'Agrigento, which had been staged at the Teatro dei Fiorentini in 1820. The title Bianca e Fernando had to be changed, because Ferdinando was the name of the heir to the throne, and no form of it could be used on a royal stage. After some delays the opera premiered at the Teatro di San Carlo in Naples on 30 May 1826 and was successful. Bellini's music was highly regarded, but there were significant reservations about Gilardoni's contribution.

For a later production, which was planned to open the new Teatro Carlo Felice in Genoa on 7 April 1828, Bellini substantially altered the music and specifically rejected a request by Gilardoni to revise the libretto himself, preferring instead Felice Romani, whom he regarded as the superior poet.

Gilardoni first worked with Donizetti at the Teatro Nuovo, writing the libretto for Otto mesi in due ore ("Eight Months in Two Hours") which premiered on 13 May 1827. He went on to collaborate with Donizetti on ten more operas. According to John Black, writing in The New Grove Dictionary of Opera: "When working with Donizetti he achieved a high level not matched when writing for others, probably due to the influence of the composer…." Black ranks Il paria, written for Donizetti c. 1829, as Gilardoni's best libretto, and Il ventaglio, written for Pietro Raimondi c. 1830, as the most often performed, but the latter shows "all too clearly the slack versification that often marred his work."

Gilardoni died in Naples.

== Librettos ==
The title, genre, composer, theatre (all in Naples), and the date of the premiere are listed.

- Bianca e Gernando, melodramma in 2 acts, Bellini, Teatro di San Carlo, 30 May 1826
- Ildegonda, melodramma, Costa, Teatro Nuovo, 1827
- Gustavo d'Orxa, melodramma, Alessandro Curmi, Teatro Nuovo, 1827
- Otto mesi in due ore, opera romantica in 3 acts, Donizetti, Teatro Nuovo, 13 May 1827
- Il borgomastro di Saardam, melodramma giocoso in 2 acts, Donizetti, Teatro del Fondo, 19 August 1827
- L'esule di Roma, melodramma eroico in 2 acts, Donizetti, Teatro di San Carlo, 1 January 1828
- Gianni di Calais, melodramma semiserio in 3 acts, Donizetti, Teatro del Fondo, 2 August 1828
- Ulisse in Itaca, opera seria in 2 acts, Ricci, Teatro di San Carlo, 12 January 1828
- Il paria, melodramma in 2 acts, Donizetti, Teatro di San Carlo, 12 January 1829
- Il giovedì grasso, farsa in 1 act, Donizetti, Teatro del Fondo, 26 February 1829
- Bannier, melodramma in 2 acts, Mario Aspa, Teatro del Fondo, 6 June 1829
- I fidanzati, ossia Il connestabile di Chester, melodramma in 3 acts, Pacini, Teatro di San Carlo, 19 November 1829
- I pazzi per progetto, farsa in 1 act, Donizetti, Teatro di San Carlo, 6 February 1830
- Il diluvio universale, azione tragico-sacra in 3 acts, Donizetti, Teatro di San Carlo, 6 March 1830
- Il carcere d'Ildegonda, melodramma in 2 acts, Mario Aspa, Teatro Nuovo, October 1830
- Il ventaglio, commedia per musica, Pietro Raimondi, Teatro Nuovo, 22 January 1831
- Edoardo in Iscozia, dramma per musica in 2 acts, Carlo Coccia, Teatro di San Carlo, 8 May 1831
- Francesca di Foix, melodramma in 1 act, Donizetti, Teatro di San Carlo, 30 May 1831
- La romanziera e l'uomo nero, farsa in 1 act, Donizetti, Teatro del Fondo, 18 June 1831
- Fausta, melodramma in 2 acts, Donizetti (libretto completed by Donizetti), Teatro di San Carlo, 12 January 1832
- Ugo d’Erinduro, melodramma in 2 acts, Giovanni Moretti, Teatro Nuovo, autumn of 1833
