= I pazzi per progetto =

Opera by Gaetano Donizetti

- Farsa by Gaetano Donizetti
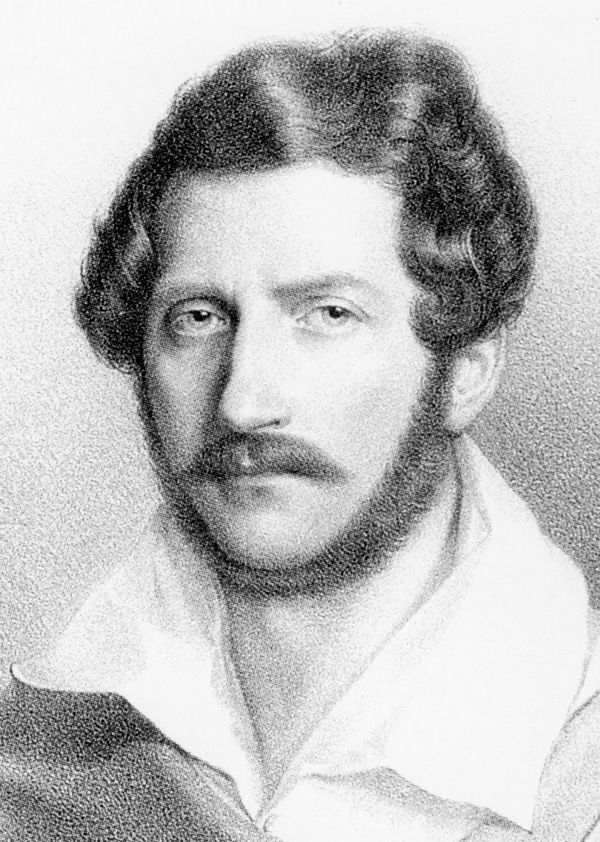
- Donizetti c. 1835
- Librettist: Domenico Gilardoni
- Language: Italian
- Premiere: 6 February 1830; Teatro San Carlo, Naples

I pazzi per progetto (Madmen by Design) is a farsa in one act by Gaetano Donizetti to a libretto by Domenico Gilardoni. The first performance took place at the Teatro di San Carlo on 6 February 1830 and was followed by its second presentation on 7 February at the Teatro del Fondo.

At the 1830 performance in Naples, some great singers of the time such as Boccabadati and Luigi Lablache performed it in a charity event, but despite the exceptional cast, the audience was really very meager. The work, carried by two women surrounded by five heavy voices, was divided into seven numbers linked by dry ("secco") or accompanied recitatives. It revealed the purest farcical style of the composer, containing the characters and forms typical of that style.

It was performed a few more times in Naples and Palermo up until 1845, and then forgotten until 1977.

== Performance history ==
In 1977 a new revision, edited by Maestro Bruno Rigacci of Florence and using the original score which had been preserved at the Conservatorio S. Pietro a Majella in Naples, was presented as part of the Opera Barga Festival. It was a resounding success with the public and the critics.

== Roles ==
- Darlemont, directore of a mental hospital, uncle of Norina - bass
- Norina, wife of Blinval - soprano
- Blinval, colonel - bass-baritone
- Cristina, a young girl, in love with Blinval - mezzo-soprano
- Venanzio, stingy old man, guardian of Cristina - bass
- Eustachio, trumpeter of Blinval's regiment - baritone
- Frank, servant of Darlemont - bass-baritone

== Synopsis ==
Place: A hospital for the insane in Paris
Time: Early 19th Century

The hospital's director, Darlemont, has a niece, Norina, married to Blinval, a colonel of dragoons. The remoteness of the man from his beloved wife due to military reasons and mutual jealousy are the causes of series of actions when the two meet again. Since the meeting takes place in the hospital which is managed by Norina's uncle, the two alternately pose themselves as crazy to find out the true feelings of each other, causing frantic carousel of deceptions and misunderstandings.

Added to all this is a very babbler and an all-too-sincere servant, (Frank), a deserter trumpeter who pretends to be a doctor (Eustace), a beautiful young girl (Christina), former lover of the colonel, who tries to escape from her old guardian (Venanzio). He in turn tries to make her go mad so that he can take her dowry.

These very well-matched ingredients result in a farce with all its rules. At the well-designed end, peace and moral obligation are restored.

== Recordings ==
Year	Cast: Darlemont, Norina, Blinval, Cristina	Conductor, Opera House and Orchestra	Label
1977	Giovanni Fancella, Anna Baldasserini, Giovanni Savoiardo, Vera Pastore	Amy Kaiser, Orchestra and Chorus of Opera di Barga, (Recording of a performance in the Teatro di Differenti, Barga, 8 September)	Audio CD: Unique Opera Records; Cat: UORC 357
1988	Leonardo Monreale, Susanna Rigacci, Graziano Polidori, Adriana Cicogna	Bruno Rigacci, Orchestra Sinfonica dell'Emilia Romagna "Arturo Toscanini", (Recorded at performances in the Teatro Rossini, Lugo, December)	Audio CD: Bongiovanni, Cat: GB 2070-2
2000	Andrea Porta, Cinzia Rizzone, Alessandro Battiato, Annarita Gemmabella	Fabrizio Maria Carminati, Orchestra Sinfonica "Gaetano Donizetti" di Bergamo, (Recorded at performances in the Piazza Cittadella, Bergamo Alta, 22 & 24 August)	Audio CD: Music Media, Cat: CD 2002
