= La romanziera e l'uomo nero =

Opera by Gaetano Donizetti

- Farsa by Gaetano Donizetti
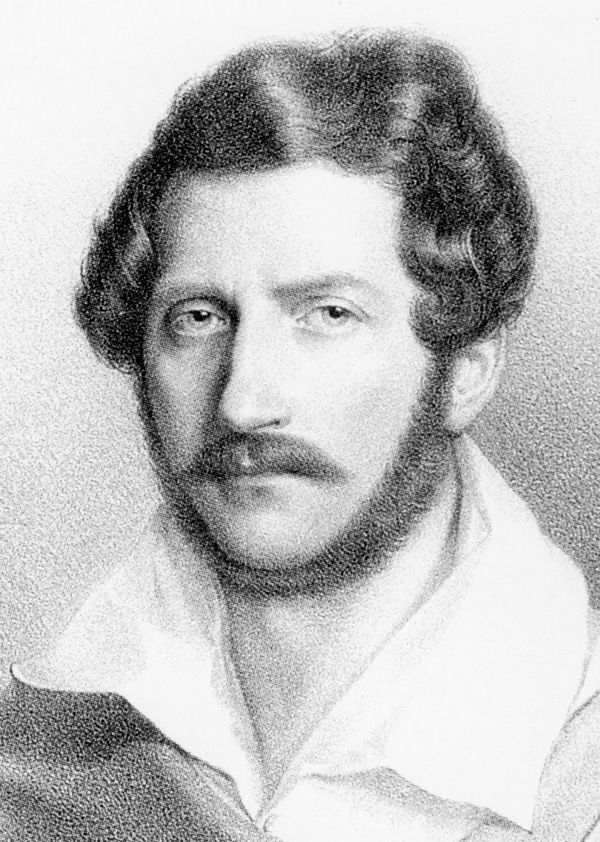
- Gaetano Donizetti c. 1835
- Librettist: Domenico Gilardoni
- Language: Italian
- Premiere: 18 June 1831; Teatro del Fondo, Naples

La romanziera e l'uomo nero (also known as La romanzesca e l'uomo nero) is an 1831 one-act farsa with music by Gaetano Donizetti and an Italian libretto by Domenico Gilardoni, possibly based on the 1819 play La donna dei romanzi by Augusto Bon. Other suggested sources include L'homme noir (1820) by Eugene Scribe and Jean-Henri Dupin and Le coiffeur et le perruquier (1824) by Scribe, Édouard-Joseph-Ennemond Mazères and Charles Nombret Saint-Laurent.

== Performance history ==
The opera was premiered on 18 June 1831 at the Teatro del Fondo, Naples, and there was only one further performance. The words and music of the arias and ensembles have survived, but the spoken dialogue has been lost. The opera's music was performed in 1982 at the Camden Festival, and in Fermo in 1988. In November 2000, staged performances took place in Rovigo with dialogue re-created by Michelangelo Zurletti from the Scribe plays on which the opera may have been based.

Of this work Ashbrook writes:

The plot is a satire on Romanticism: in the rondo-finale Antonina assures her father that she will give up willows, cypresses, urns and ashes, and take up more appropriate pursuits like singing and dancing and going to the opera.

He also points out that Filidoro's canzonetta is a parody of the Gondolier's song from Rossini's Otello.

== Roles ==
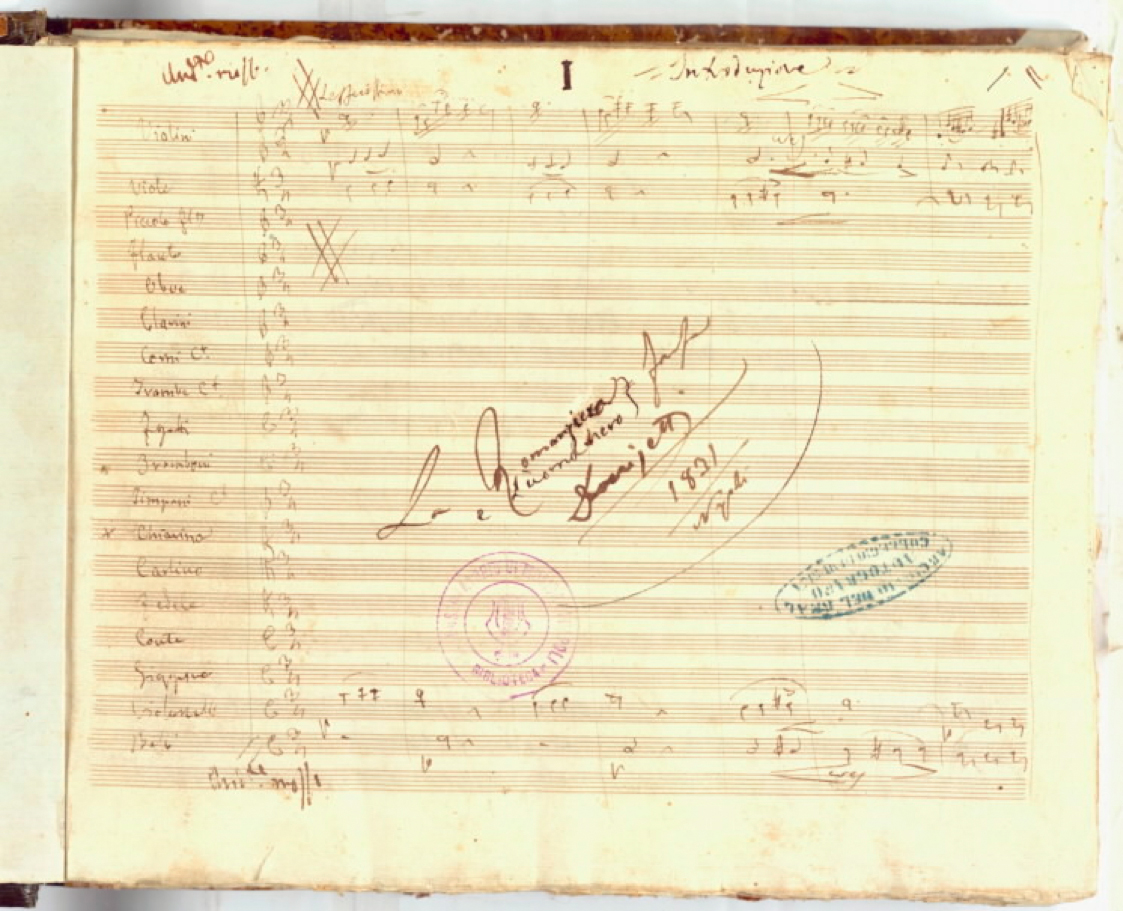
Autograph title, 1831

Role	Voice type	Premiere Cast, 18 June 1831
The Count (il Conte)	bass	Gennaro Ambrosini
Antonina, his daughter	soprano	Luigia Boccabadati
Chiarina, his niece	mezzo-soprano	Marietta Gioia-Tamburini
Fedele, hoping to marry Chiarina	tenor	Francesco Salvetti
Carlino, the son of a friend of the Count	tenor	Lorenzo Lombardi
Filidoro, the man in black (l'uomo nero)	baritone	Antonio Tamburini
Tommaso, his uncle	bass	Gennarino Luzio
Trappolina, Antonia's governess	soprano	Anna Manzi-Salvetti
Giappone, the Count's majordomo	bass	Tauro
Nicola, a servant	bass	

== List of musical numbers ==
Scene	Description	Performed by	First lines of sections
1	Introduction	Giappone, Carlino, Il Conte, Fedele, Chiarina, Trappolina, Tommaso	"Vi prego, avanti avanti" ... "M'insulta, corbella!"
2	Cavatina	Antonia, Tommaso, Trappolina	"Oh Elodia solitaria"
3	Canzonetta	Filidoro	"Non v'e maggio dolore"
3	Duet	Antonia, Filidoro	"Ciel! Fia ver? Mio Filidoro!" ... "Ahi la mia nascita" ... "Fuggir da queste mura"
4	Trio	Tommaso, Chiarina, Fedele	"Cinque sensi appena nato" ... "L'occhietto semi-chiuso"
5	Duet	Chiarina, Filidoro	"Che paura! Che paura!" ... "Ah! Ah! Ah! Ah!"
6	Trio	Nicola, Antonia, Tommaso/ Tommaso, Nicola, Trappolina	"Fuggiam, fuggiam!" ... "Ei stresso! La mia vittima" ... "Destrieri infocati"
7	Rondo finale	Antonia, Conte, Fedele, Carlino, Filidoro/ Filidoro, Antonia, All	"Si, colpevole son io" ... "Lascio l'ombre ed I fantasmi"

== Recordings ==
Year	Cast: (Antonia, Chiarina, Fedele, Carlino, Filidoro, Tommaso)	Conductor, Orchestra, Chorus	Label
2000	Elisabetta Scano, Adriana Cicogna, Bruce Ford, Paul Austin Kelly, Pietro Spagnoli, Bruno Praticò	David Parry, Academy of St Martin in the Fields	Audio CD: Opera Rara; Cat: ORC19
2000	Patrizia Cigna, Claudia Marchi, Giovanni Gregnanin, Patrizio Saudelli, Alessandro Calamai, Gian Paolo Fiocchi	Franco Piva, Orchestra Filarmonica Veneta "G. F. Malipiero", Coro del Teatro Sociale di Rovigo	Audio CD: Bongiovanni; Cat: GB 2287/88-2 (2 CDs); Recorded live on 25 and 26 November 2000
