= Francesca di Foix =

Opera by Gaetano Donizetti

- Opera by Gaetano Donizetti
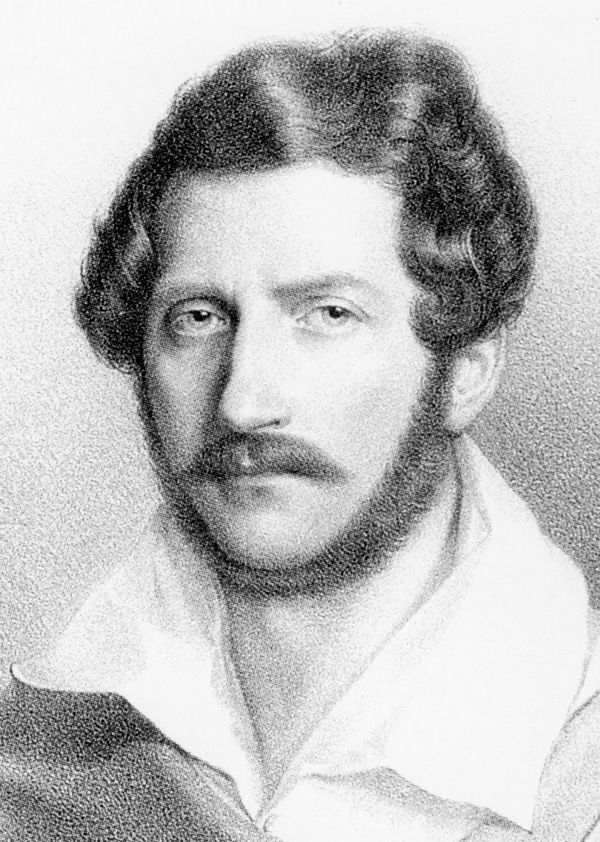
- Gaetano Donizetti c. 1835
- Librettist: Domenico Gilardoni
- Language: Italian
- Based on: Life of Françoise de Foix
- Premiere: 30 May 1831; Teatro San Carlo, Naples

Francesca di Foix is a melodramma giocoso (comic opera) in one act by Gaetano Donizetti with a libretto by Domenico Gilardoni based on one by Jean-Nicolas Bouilly and Emmanuel Mercier-Dupaty for Henri Montan Berton's 3-act opéra-comique Françoise de Foix, inspired by the life of Françoise de Foix.

It received its first performance on 30 May 1831 at the Teatro San Carlo, Naples.

== Performance history ==
The opera is chiefly known for having provided segments to other Donizetti operas, including Ugo, conte di Parigi, L'elisir d'amore and Gabriella di Vergy although a complete recording exists on the Opera Rara label.

It was given in London in November 2013, along with Debussy's L'enfant prodigue as a double bill, at the Guildhall School of Music staged by the Australian opera director Stephen Barlow.

== Roles ==
Role	Voice type	Premiere Cast, 30 May 1831 (Conductor: - )
Francesca	soprano	Luigia Boccabadati
The king	baritone	Antonio Tamburini
Edmondo	contralto	Marietta Gioia Tamburini
The count	bass	Giovanni Campagnoli
The duke	tenor	Lorenzo Bonfigli
Knights, bridesmaids, peasants

== Synopsis ==
Time: The Middle Ages
Place: France

The Count is determined to keep his beautiful wife Francesca well away from the temptations of the French court. Knowing the amorous ways of the nobility he tells them that she is unwilling to appear in public because she is extremely ugly.

Unfortunately this raises the interest of the King who despatches one of his gentlemen (the Duke) to investigate, and if he finds that the Countess is beautiful he must lure her back incognito to court.

Sure enough the Duke is able to persuade Francesca to return to Paris with him. Rather than admit his deceit her husband at first refuses to acknowledge who she is. To force his hand the King announces that a tournament is to be held and the winning knight will be given Francesca's hand in marriage.

The Count can no longer keep up his subterfuge and admits that, driven by jealousy, he lied to the King and his courtiers. After due admonishment by the King all is forgiven and the Count and Countess live happily ever after.

== Recordings ==
Year	Cast: (Francesca, King, Edmondo, Count, Duke)	Conductor, Opera House and Orchestra	Label
1982	Gillian Sullivan, Lynne Smythe, Della Jones, Donald Maxwell, Gordon Christie	David Parry (conductor) David Parry, Opera Rara Orchestra and Chorus (Recording of performance at Camden Festival in the Collegiate Theatre, March)	Cassette: Live Opera; Cat: 03460
2004	Annick Massis, Pietro Spagnoli, Jennifer Larmore, Alfonso Antoniozzi, Bruce Ford	Antonello Allemandi, London Philharmonic Orchestra and the Geoffrey Mitchell Choir	Audio CD: Opera Rara; Cat: ORC 28
