= Giuliano Carella =

Italian conductor (born 1961)

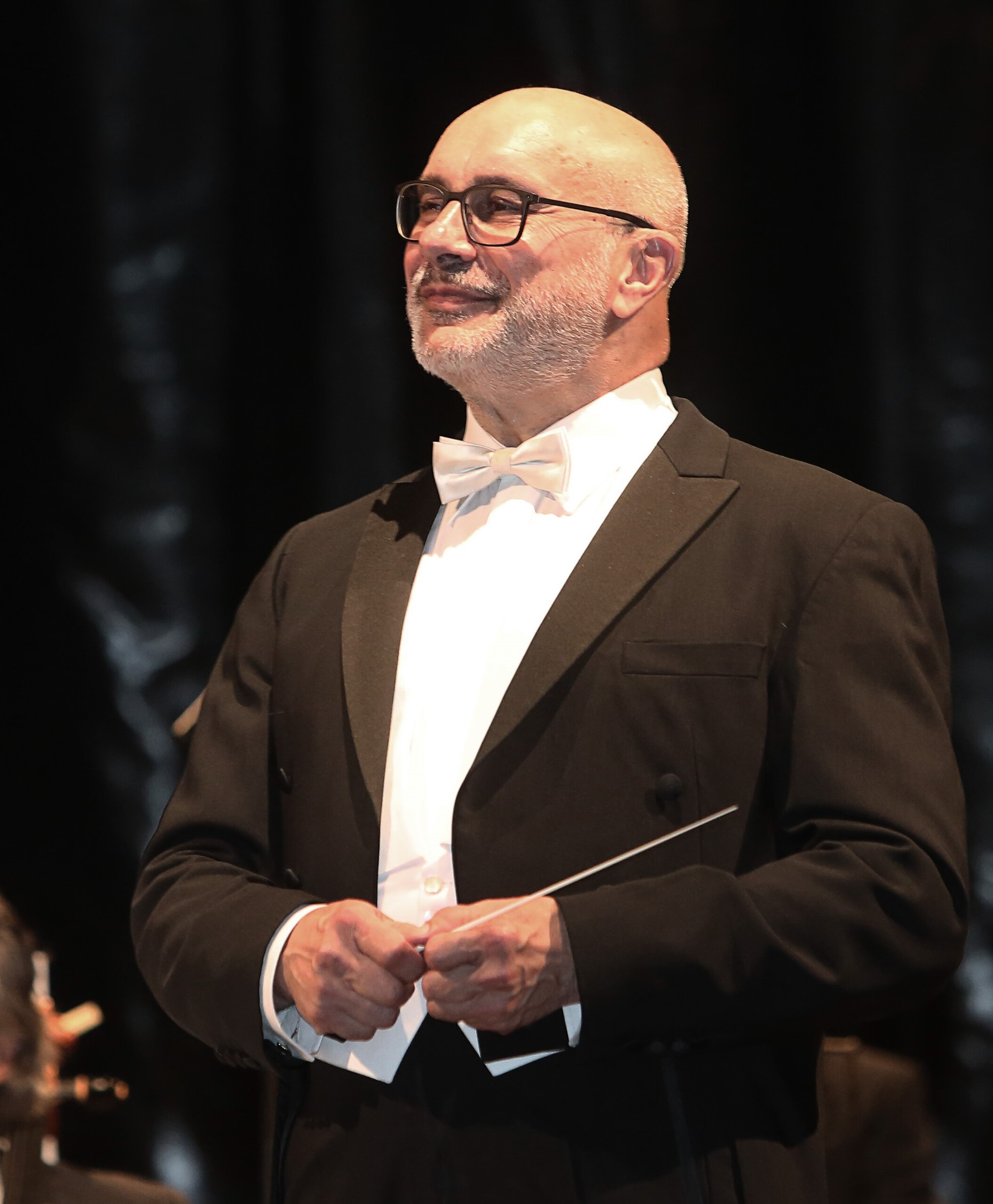
- Carella in 2019
- Born: 1956 (age 69–70); Milan, Italy
- Occupations: Conductor; Artistic director
- Organizations: I Solisti Veneti

Giuliano Carella (born 1956) is an Italian conductor, especially of Italian opera, who made an international career.

== Life and career ==
Carella was born in Milan in 1956. He studied conducting at the Milan Conservatory and composition at the Padua Conservatory "Cesare Pollini". He studied conducting further with Franco Ferrara at the Accademia Musicale Chigiana in Siena. He made his debut in 1987 and has conducted a wide repertoire of Italian music, with a focus on operas by Rossini and belcanto operas. He conducted Puccini's Turandot and Bellini's Norma at the Liceu in Barcelona, Rossini's La Cenerentola in Geneva.

He was music director of the I Solisti Veneti chamber orchestra from 2019 and became been artistic director a year later.

Carella recorded Pacini's L'ultimo giorno di Pompei, Verdi's Ernani and recitals of Jennifer Larmore and Sumi Jo, among others. For Opera Rara, he recorded Rossini's Elisabetta, regina d'Inghilterra and Adelaide di Borgogna, Donizetti's Il diluvio universale and excerpts from Meyerbeers L'esule di Granata.
