= Frederick Lablache =

English singer

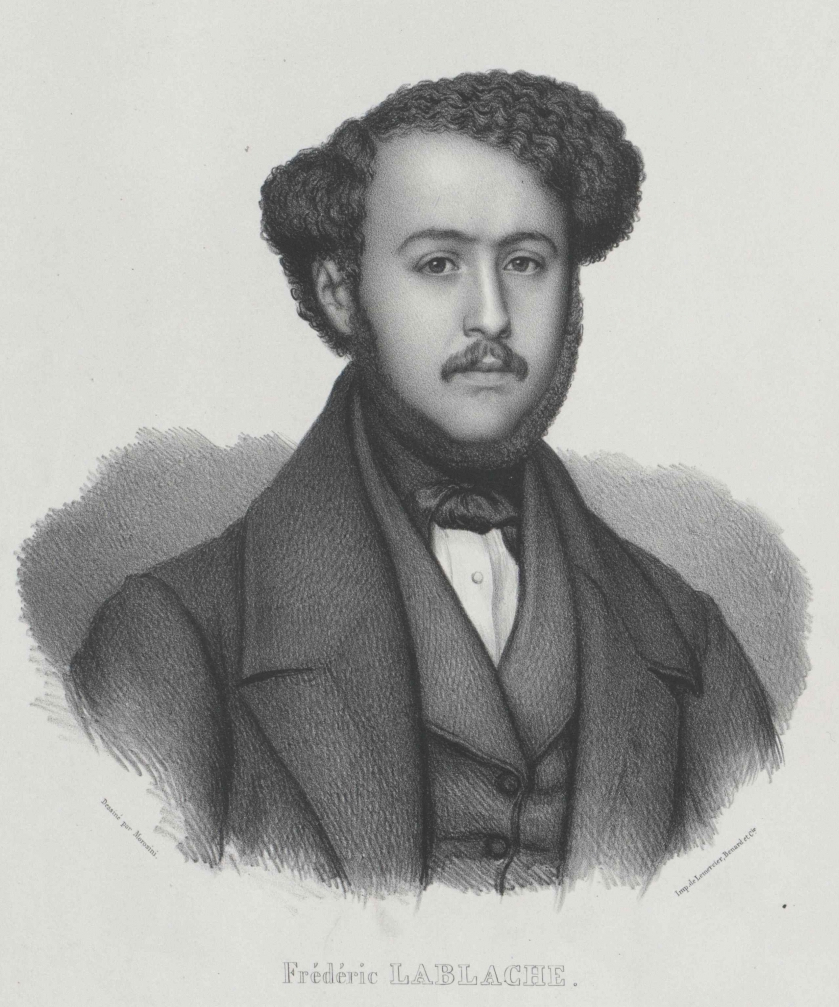

Frederick Lablache (29 August 1815 – 30 January 1887) was an English singer. The eldest son of Luigi Lablache, vocalist, was educated by his father. He married and worked with the singer Fanny Wyndham. They both taught at the Academy of Music

== Life ==
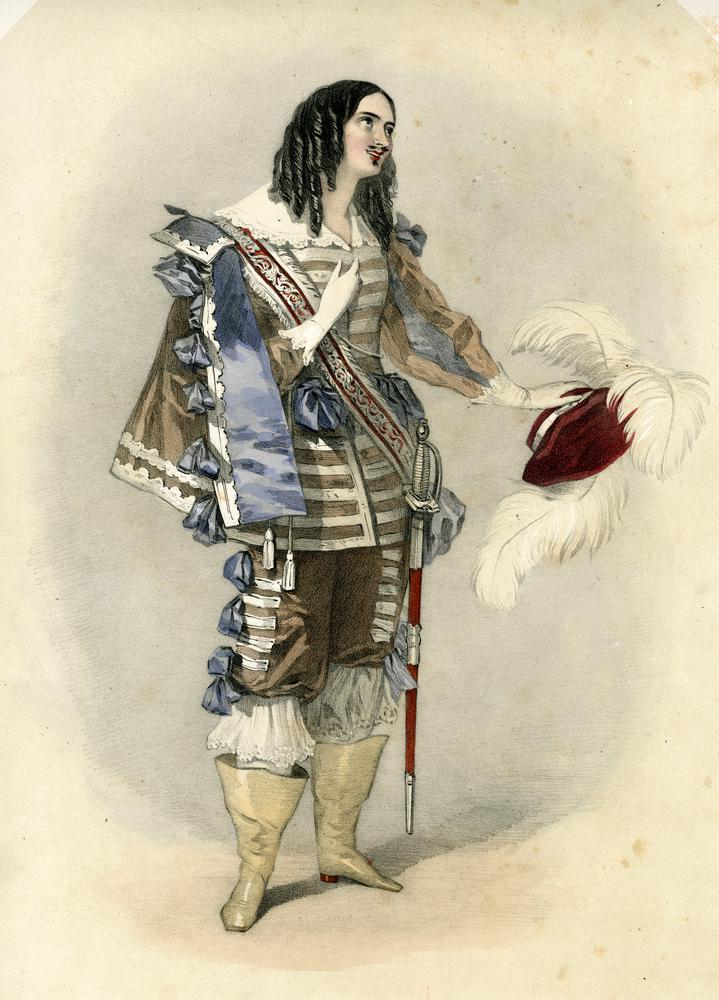
Fanny Wyndham in costume

About 1837 he appeared at the King's Theatre, London, in Italian opera, and afterwards frequently sang at Manchester with Italian singers such as Giovanni Matteo Mario, Giulia Grisi, and Favanti. In 1844 he took a part in Così fan tutte at Her Majesty's Theatre, and in 1846 in Il matrimonio segreto. He played the part of Count Rodolphe to Jenny Lind's Amina in La sonnambula on her first visit to Manchester on 28 August 1847 and he also appeared with her in other character roles under the management of Michael Balfe in 1849. About 1865 he withdrew from the stage, and taught at the Royal Academy of Music.

His wife, Fanny Wyndham Lablache, who died in 1877, was a vocalist, whose maiden name was Wilton, was born in Scotland. She studied at the Royal Academy of Music in London between 1836–37 and then made her début at the Lyceum Theatre, afterwards also appearing at Her Majesty's Theatre. She was a serviceable vocalist and a teacher of much skill. After their marriage they both taught at the Royal College of Music. They had retired from the stage and lived in London. Fanny died in Paris on 23 September 1877.

He died at their home 51 Albany Street, London on 30 January 1887. Their son, Luigi Lablache, was an actor who died in 1914. He was the grandfather of the actor Stewart Granger.
