= La lettera anonima =

Opera by Gaetano Donizetti

- Farsa by Gaetano Donizetti
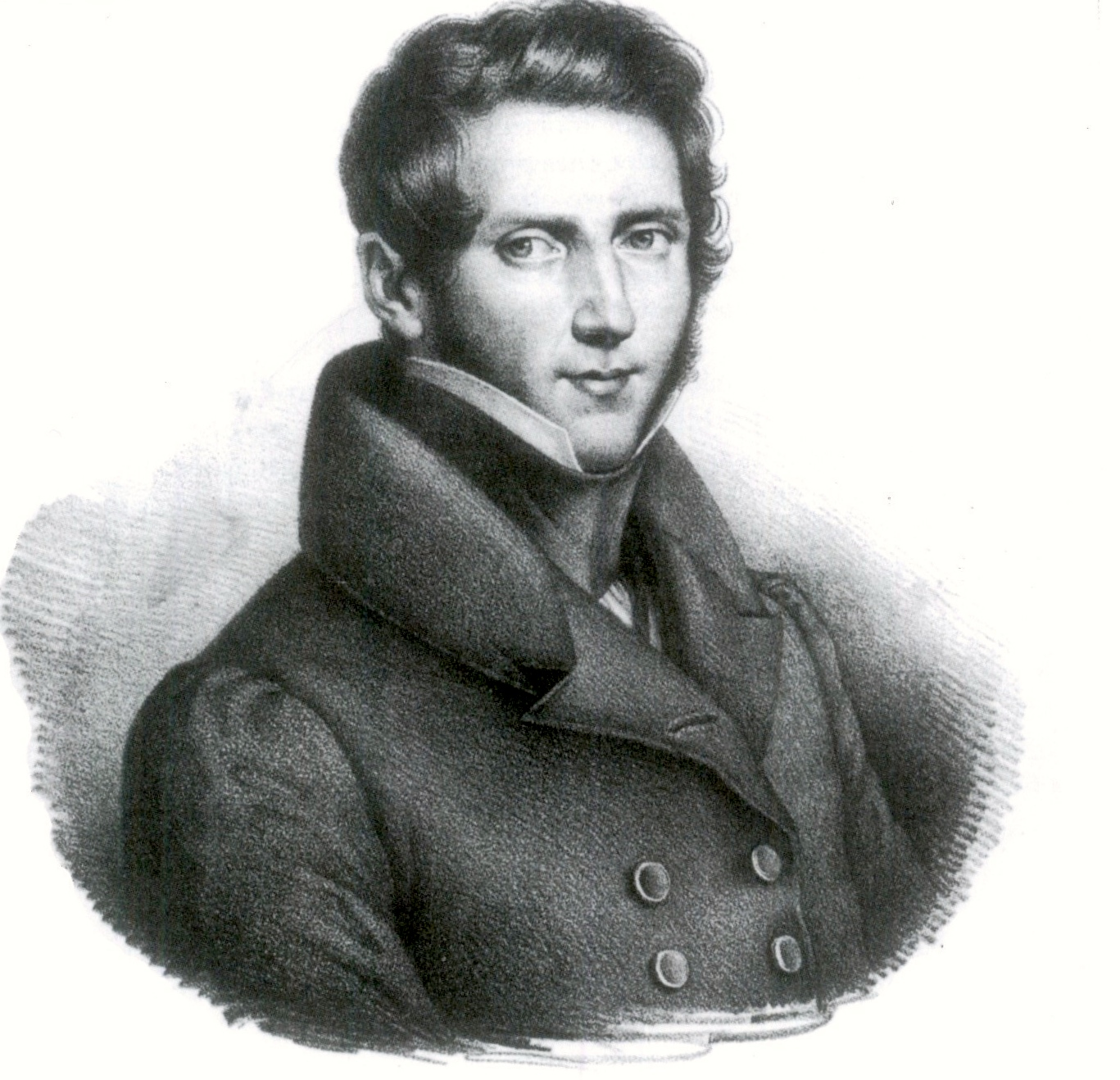
- Donizetti as a young man
- Librettist: Giulio Genoino
- Language: Italian
- Based on: Mélite, ou Les fausses lettres by Pierre Corneille
- Premiere: 29 June 1822; Teatro Nuovo, Naples

La lettera anonima (The anonymous letter) is a farce in one act composed by Gaetano Donizetti in 1822 to a libretto by Giulio Genoino, a former monk and the official censor of the Kingdom of the Two Sicilies. Genoino based his libretto on his own farce which, in turn, had been based on Mélite, ou Les fausses lettres by Pierre Corneille in 1630.

With a letter of recommendation from his teacher Johann Simon Mayr, Donizetti was in Naples and, on 12 May 1822, came to an agreement to write the opera with the impresario Domenico Barbaja, for whom he had already produced La zingara (The Gypsy Girl). Six weeks later he presented the new farce to the public, the premiere taking place on 29 June 1822.

Overall, the opera appears to have been well received and given twenty performances, although according to Donizetti, "it was half-ruined by a novice singer (Cecconi)". However, as has been noted, "the score contains an attractive speciality number for the dancing master, Flageolet, and an extended quartet, 'Stelle che intesti', the one number of the work to be praised by critics after the premiere" because it avoided "those caballetas and that symmetrical repetition of motifs which obliges all the performers to repeat the same musical phrases no matter what the different emotions may agitate them".

== Roles ==
Role	Voice type	Premiere cast, 29 June 1822 (Conductor: – )
Countess Rosina	soprano	Flora Fabbri
Captain Filinto, her lover	tenor	Giovanni Battista
Melita, Rosina's tenant	soprano	Teresa Cecconi
Lauretta, Rosina's maid	soprano	Raffaela de Bernardis
Don Macario, Rosina's Uncle	baritone	De Franchi
Giliberto, Don Macario's Housekeeper	bass	Giovanni Pace
Flagiolet, A Dancing Teacher	baritone	Calvarola
Chorus: Servants and Room-attendants

== Synopsis ==
Place: France
Time: 17th century

Countess Rosina and Captain Filinto are going to get married. An anonymous letter claiming that the Captain is already married to another arrives on the wedding day. This letter is finally found to be false, and the preparations for the wedding party continue.

== Recordings ==
Year	Cast: Countess Rosina, Filinto, Melita, Lauretta, Don Macario	Conductor, Opera House and Orchestra	Label
1972	Benedetta Pecchioli, Pietro Bottazzo, Rosa Laghezza, Carla Virgili, Rolando Panerai	Franco Caracciolo, Orchestra Scarlatti di Napoli and the Amici della Polifonia Chorus	CD: On Stage; Cat: 4702
