= Monsieur de Pourceaugnac =

1669 three-act comédie-ballet by Molière

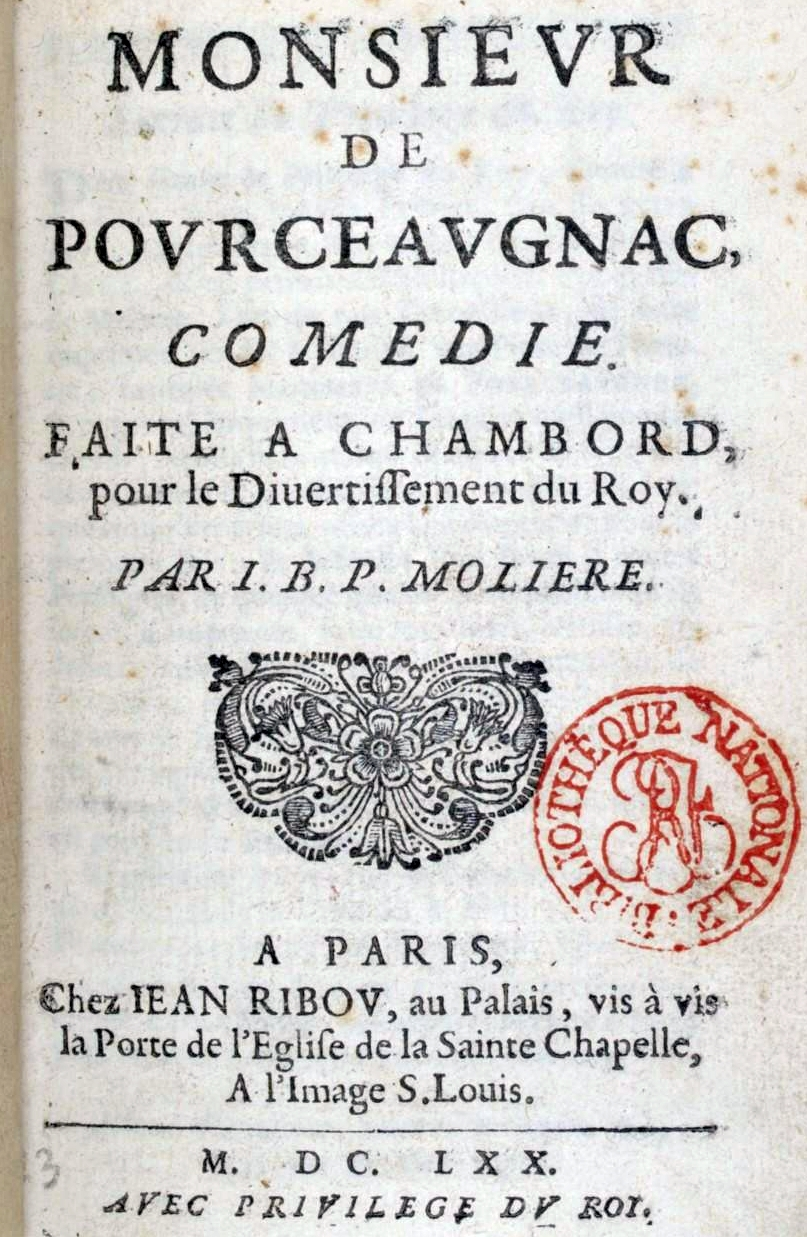
The title page of the original manuscript

Monsieur de Pourceaugnac is a three-act comédie-ballet—a ballet interrupted by spoken dialogue—by Molière, first presented on 6 October 1669 before the court of Louis XIV at the Château of Chambord by Molière's troupe of actors. Subsequent public performances were given at the theatre of the Palais-Royal beginning on 18 November 1669. The music was composed by Jean-Baptiste Lully, the choreography was by Pierre Beauchamp, the sets were by Carlo Vigarani, and the costumes were created by the chevalier d’Arvieux.

Lully notably took a role himself on stage in the work's première, portraying a physician in the dance of the enemas. (Molière regularly performed in his own stage works.)

== Overview ==
This comedy-ballet was written in September 1669 by Molière at the Chateau de Chambord, a village located in the former province of Orleans (Kingdom of France) and the current French department of Loir-et-Cher.

The piece was published in Paris by Jean Ribou in a book dating from 1670.

The ballet score by Lully is recorded in two books published between 1700 and 1710. For one of them, the exact date is unknown, probably made by the workshop of the copyist and librarian of Louis XIV, André Danican Philidor, and consists of alternating sheets of ballet and texts of the script. The other, probably made in 1706 by the copyist Henri Foucault contains only the ballet score.

Several previous works are discussed as having in part inspired Molière's Pourceaugnac: the General History of Thieves François de Calvi published in 1631; "La désolation des filous sur la défense des armes" (The desolation of pickpockets on the defence of war); and "Les malades qui se portent bien" (The sick who are well") by Jean Simonin dit Chevalier, a one-act comedy published in 1662. In 1705, Jean-Léonor Le Gallois de Grimarest, Molière's first biographer, writes about the origins of the character Pourceaugnac: "It is said that Pourceaugnac was made based on a gentleman Limousin, who during one show, had a quarrel with theatre actors, whom he ridiculed, with which he was charged. Molière to avenge this act, put it into the theater and made a fun for the people, who were delighted with this piece, which was performed at Chambord in September of 1669, and in Paris a month later."

== Synopsis ==
Monsieur de Pourceaugnac is betrothed to Julie, the daughter of Oronte. Unbeknownst to him, Julie is in love with the young and handsome Parisian Éraste and has no desire to wed Pourceaugnac. In order to avoid the impending marriage, Julie and Éraste solicit the help of Sbrigani who uses all of his guile to help the young couple through a series of clever deceits.

== Performances ==
The piece premiered at the Château de Chambord for the entertainment of the King of France, Louis XIV on 6 October 1669.

The work was a big success and was performed 49 times in the lifetime of its author; in addition to the first performance at Chateau de Chambord, it played once, 4 November 1669, at Versailles and 47 times in the theatre of the Palais Royal in Paris between 15 November 1669 and 11 September 1672.

After the death of Molière, the play was performed once the theatre of the hotel Guénégaud, Paris, in 1680, at Saint-Germain-en-Laye in 1681, twelve times in the theatre of the rue des Fosses in Saint-Germain, Paris, between 1701 and 1750, once at the Château de Bellevue in 1751, five times at the Grand Theatre de la Monnaie in Brussels between 1753 and 1785, three times in the theatre du Capitole in Toulouse between 1786 and 1789, the theatre national Caen, then twice at the Grand Theatre de la Monnaie in Brussels in 1791.

== Adaptations ==
Squire Trelooby (1704) is an English-language adaptation of the play by William Congreve, William Walsh and John Vanbrugh.

Operatic settings of the play include those by Castil-Blaze (a pasticcio using music of Rossini, Weber, and others; 1826), Alberto Franchetti (Il signore di Pourceaugnac; 1897), and Frank Martin (1962). The play is also one of the sources of the opera Der Rosenkavalier by Richard Strauss and Hugo von Hofmannsthal.

There are film versions of Molière's play from 1930 and 1985 (by Michel Mitrani).

Gaetano Donizetti's comic opera Il giovedì grasso, o il nuovo Pourceaugnac is not a setting of Molière's play, but instead depicts a scheme which the characters consciously model on Monsieur de Pourceaugnac.
