= Il diluvio universale =

Opera by Gaetano Donizetti

- Opera by Gaetano Donizetti
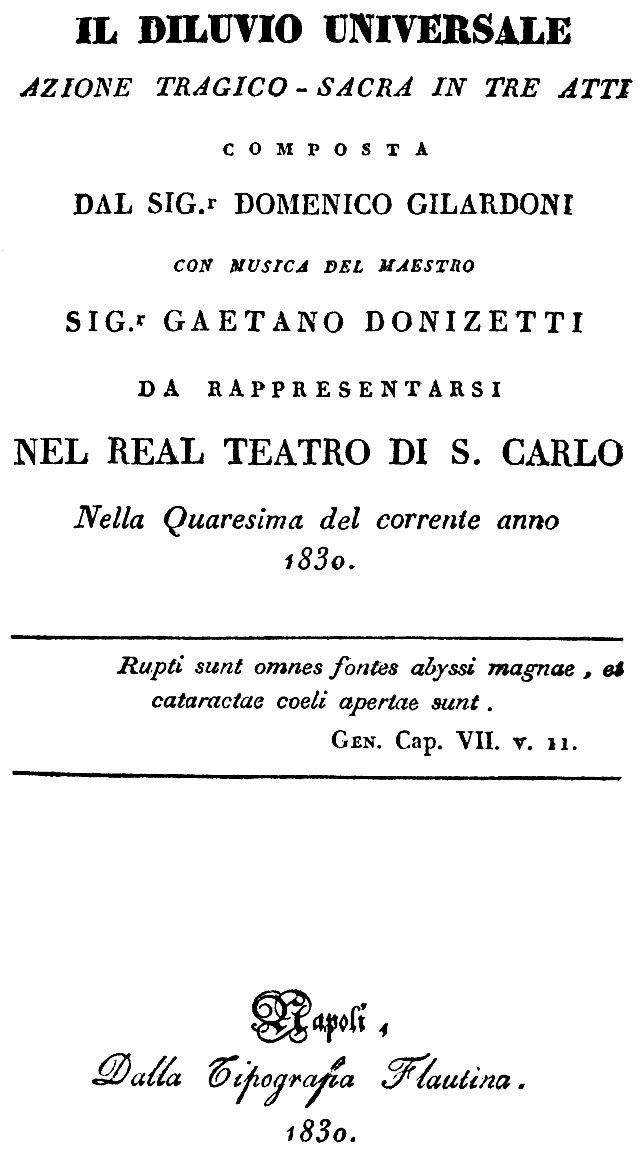
- Title page of 1830 libretto
- Librettist: Domenico Gilardoni
- Language: Italian
- Based on: Lord Byron's Heaven and Earth
- Premiere: 6 March 1830; Teatro San Carlo, Naples

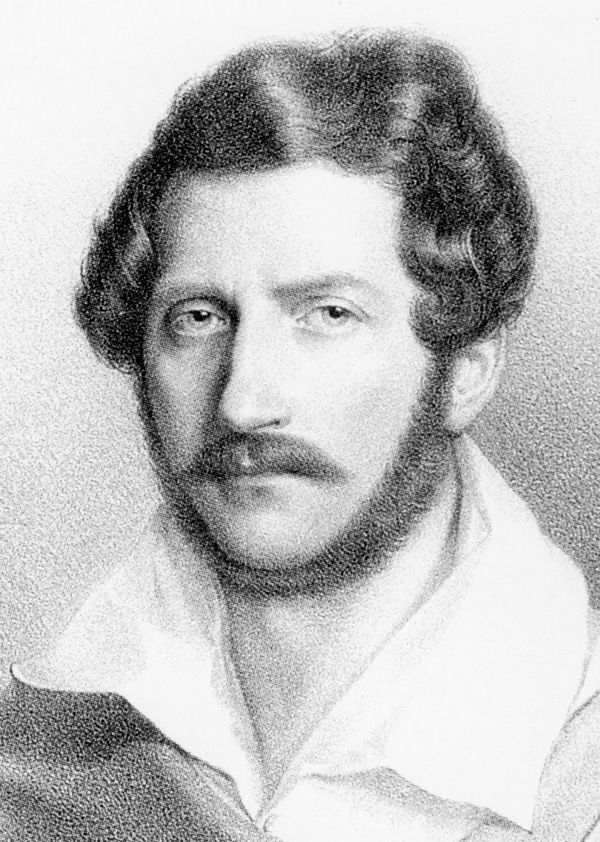
Gaetano Donizetti c. 1835

Il diluvio universale (The great flood) is an azione tragico-sacra, or opera, by Gaetano Donizetti. The Italian libretto was written by Domenico Gilardoni after Lord Byron's Heaven and Earth and Francesco Ringhieri's tragedy Il diluvio (1788).

== Performance history ==
19th century

The opera premiered at the Teatro San Carlo, Naples on 6 March 1830. It failed to become an instant success.

It is known that for the premiere production to be accepted, it had to be given to the church censors in the form of an oratorio, since its planned production date was within the period of fasting. It was only allowed due to its being a biblical story.

Donizetti revised the opera and a new production opened on 17 January 1834 at Genoa's Teatro Carlo Felice. But after another staging in 1837 in Paris, it disappeared for 147 years.

20th century and beyond

The opera was not presented again until 1985 in Genoa.

The first production in Switzerland took place at St. Gallen where, since 2006, an opera is presented in the open air in front of the Cathedral around the first weekend of July. The production of Il diluvio was also given at the St. Galler Festspiele 2010 when Mirco Palazzi, Majella Cullagh and Manuela Custer appeared.

In 2023 a new production was given at Festival Donizetti in Bergamo with Riccardo Frizza as director and Nahuel di Pierro, Susanna Gianfaldoni and Enea Scala performing in the main roles.

== Roles ==
Role	Voice type	Premiere Cast, 6 March 1830 (Conductor: - )
Noè	bass	Luigi Lablache
Jafet	baritone	Gennaro Ambrosini
Sem	tenor	Giovanni Arrigotti
Cam	bass	Lorenzo Salvi
Tesbite	soprano	Fabiani
Asfene	soprano	Cecilia Grassi
Abra	mezzo-soprano	Edvige Ricci
Cadmo	tenor	Berardo Winter
Sela, Azael's mother	soprano	Luigia Boccabadati
Ada, Sela's friend	soprano	Maria Carraro
Artoo	tenor	Gaetano Chizzola
Azael, child	silent	
Chorus

== Synopsis ==
The opera tells the biblical story of the great flood.

== Recordings ==
Year	Cast (Noè, Sela, Ada, Cadmo)	Conductor, Opera House and Orchestra	Label
2005	Mirco Palazzi, Majella Cullagh, Manuela Custer, Colin Lee	Giuliano Carella, London Philharmonic Orchestra and Geoffrey Mitchell Choir (1834 version)	Audio CD: Opera Rara; Cat: ORC 31
2023	Nahuel Di Pierro, Giuliana Gianfaldoni, Maria Elena Pepi, Enea Scala	Riccardo Frizza, Orchestra Donizetti Opera, Chorus of La Scala Academy (1830 version; producers: Nicolò Massazza & Jacopo Bedogni; recorded live, 17 November, Teatro Donizetti)	Blu-ray/DVD: Dynamic
