= Alex Mica =

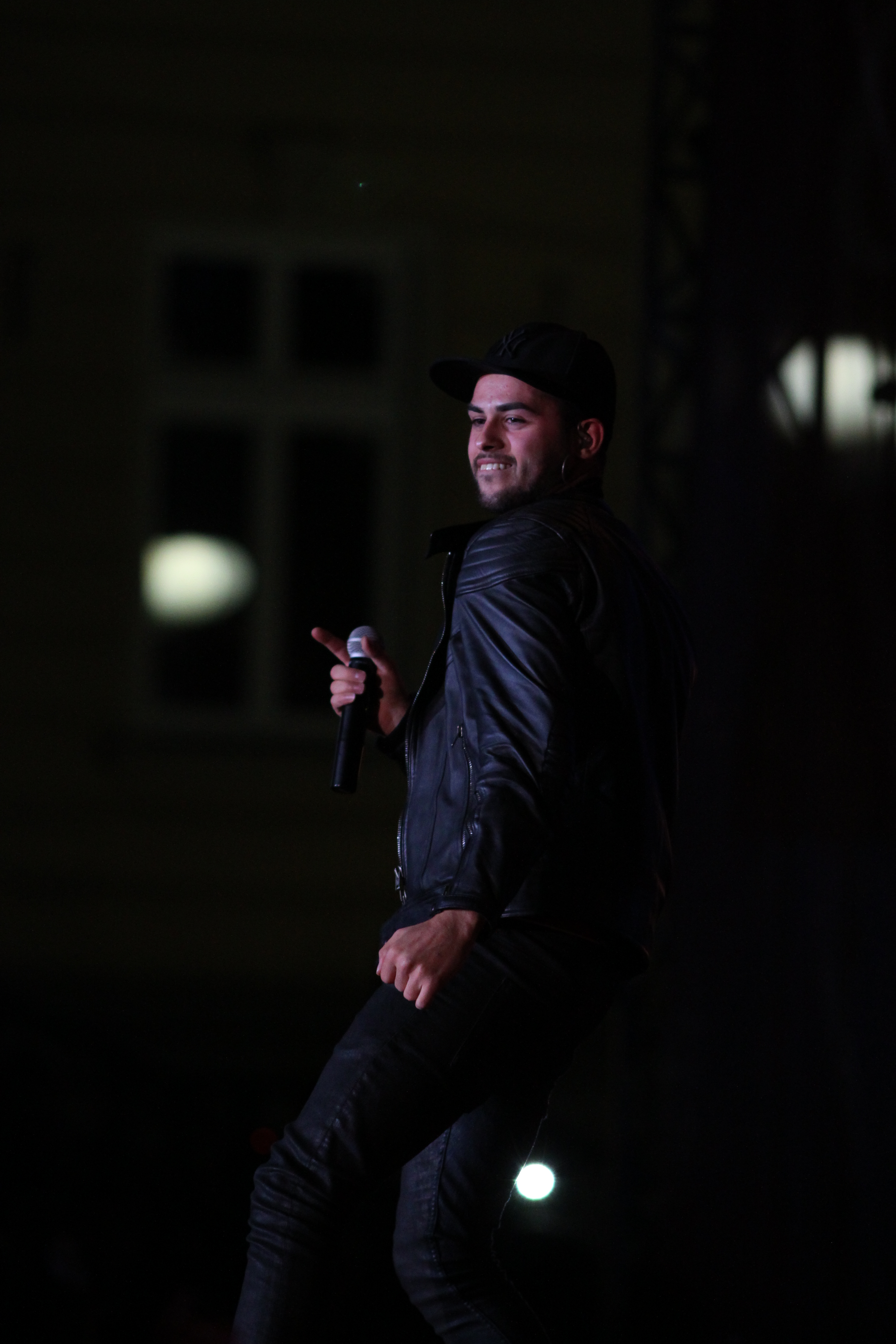

Background information
- Born: Mica Alexandru Cătălin; 25 August 1991 (age 34); Bucovăț, Timiș County, Romania
- Genres: Pop, Dance, Urban, R&B
- Occupations: Singer, songwriter
- Instruments: Piano, Vocals (Tenor)
- Years active: 2011-present
- Labels: 1Artist Music, Voices Media, Cat Music, Phonex Music
- Website: alexmica.com

Alexandru Cătălin Mica (Romanian pronunciation: [alekˈsandru kətəˈlin ˈmika]; born 25 August 1991), known as Alex Mica, is a Romanian dance/pop music singer.

Mica's song "Dalinda" placed on the Bulgaria Top 20 chart for three weeks in May–June 2012. For this song, he won Best New Act at that year's Romanian Music Awards.
