= Giovanni Battista Rubini =

Italian opera singer

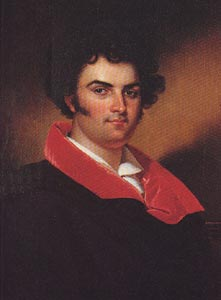
Giovanni Battista Rubini

Giovanni Battista Rubini (7 April 1794 – 3 March 1854) was an Italian tenor, as famous in his time as Enrico Caruso in a later day. His ringing and expressive coloratura dexterity in the highest register of his voice, the tenorino, inspired the writing of operatic roles which today are almost impossible to cast. As a singer Rubini was the major early exponent of the Romantic style of the bel canto era of Vincenzo Bellini and Gaetano Donizetti.

Rubini is remembered as an extraordinary bel canto singer, one of the most famous in Europe in the 1820s to 1840s. He also popularized the use of a pervasive vibrato as a means of heightening the emotional impact of his operatic performances. However, if his upper register was exceptional—he could effortlessly go up to a "ringing" high F (F5) (a note that most tenors today escape because of their "chesty" technique), he was reported as barely audible in the others parts of his voice and his tone was "slightly veiled". He also had a limited volume control, struggling to produce mezzo-forte or mezzo-piano dynamics. On the other hand, he was admired for the "infectious" joy he took to sing, his great agility and refined musicianship.

== Career ==
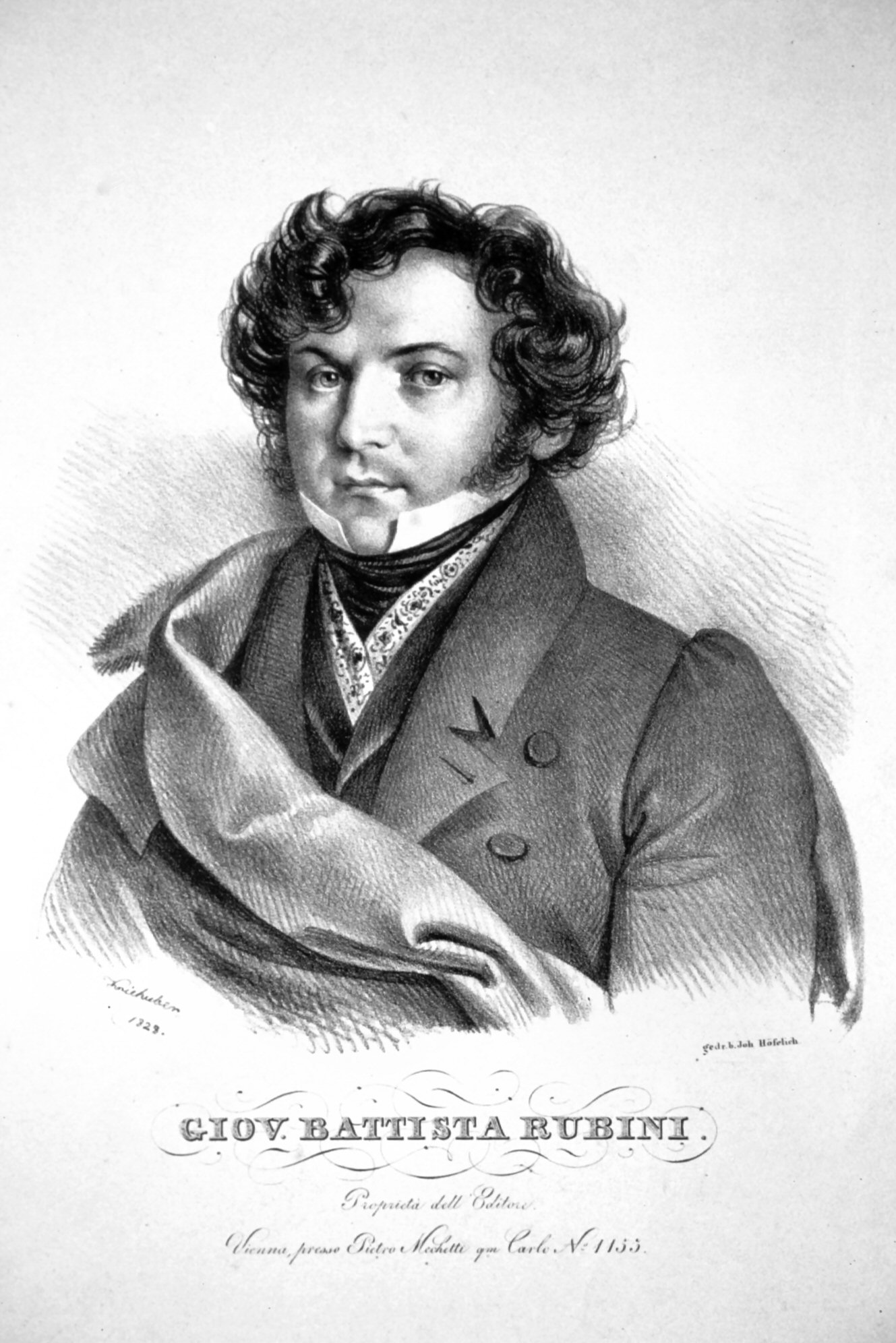
Giovanni Battista Rubini

Born in Romano di Lombardia, Rubini began as a violinist at twelve years of age at the Teatro Riccardi in Bergamo. His first appearance as singer was 1814 in Pavia in Le lagrime d'una vedova by Pietro Generali.

After ten years spent in Naples between 1815 and 1825, during which he also scored spectacular successes in France in the 1825/26 season in opera by Rossini, he moved permanently to Paris, performing in Rossini's La Cenerentola, Otello, and La donna del lago. He divided his time between Paris (in the Autumn and Winter) and London (in the Spring).

His special relation with Vincenzo Bellini began with Bianca e Fernando (1826) and continued until I puritani (1835), when he was one of the long-remembered "Puritani quartet" for whose voices the opera was written. The three other members of the illustrious quartet were Giulia Grisi, Antonio Tamburini and Luigi Lablache. The four appeared together again in Donizetti's Marino Faliero during the same season, then travelled to London with the Irish composer Michael William Balfe for a further round of operatic engagements.

Rubini was admitted as an honorary member of the Accademia Filarmonica di Bologna and retired with a great fortune in 1845. He died in his hometown of Romano in 1854, and is buried in the cemetery there, within a large marble monument.

Rubini was referred to favorably in Gustave Flaubert's Madame Bovary, alongside other notable singers of the time.
