= Melodramma =

Italian opera term

Melodramma (plural: melodrammi) is a 17th-century Italian term for a text to be set as an opera, or the opera itself. In the 19th century, it was used in a much narrower sense by English writers to discuss developments in the early Italian libretto, e.g., Rigoletto and Un ballo in maschera. Characteristic are the influence of French bourgeois drama, female instead of male protagonists, and the practice of opening the action with a chorus.

It should not be confused with melodrama (spelt with a single rather than a double m) in the sense either of Victorian stage melodrama (drama of exaggerated intensity) or of spoken declamation accompanied by background music (in Italian, melologo).
