= Farsa =

Opera genre

Farsa (Italian, literally: farce, plural: farse) is a genre of opera, associated with Venice in the late 18th and early 19th centuries. It is also sometimes called farsetta.

Farse were normally one-act operas, sometimes performed together with short ballets. Many of the recorded productions were at the Teatro San Moisè in Venice, often during Carnival. Musically they may have derived from the two-act dramma giocoso, although there were other influences, including the French comédie mêlée d'ariettes.

Few of the original 18th-century farse are now performed. The German composer Johann Simon Mayr, who lived in Northern Italy, wrote about 30 farse. Rossini wrote five examples: La cambiale di matrimonio (1810), L'inganno felice (1812), La scala di seta (1812), Il Signor Bruschino (1813), and Adina (1818). In addition, his L'occasione fa il ladro (1812), though called a Burletta per musica, is a farsa in all but name.
