= Teatro del Fondo =

Theater in Naples, Italy

Coordinates: 40.839797°N 14.254197°E

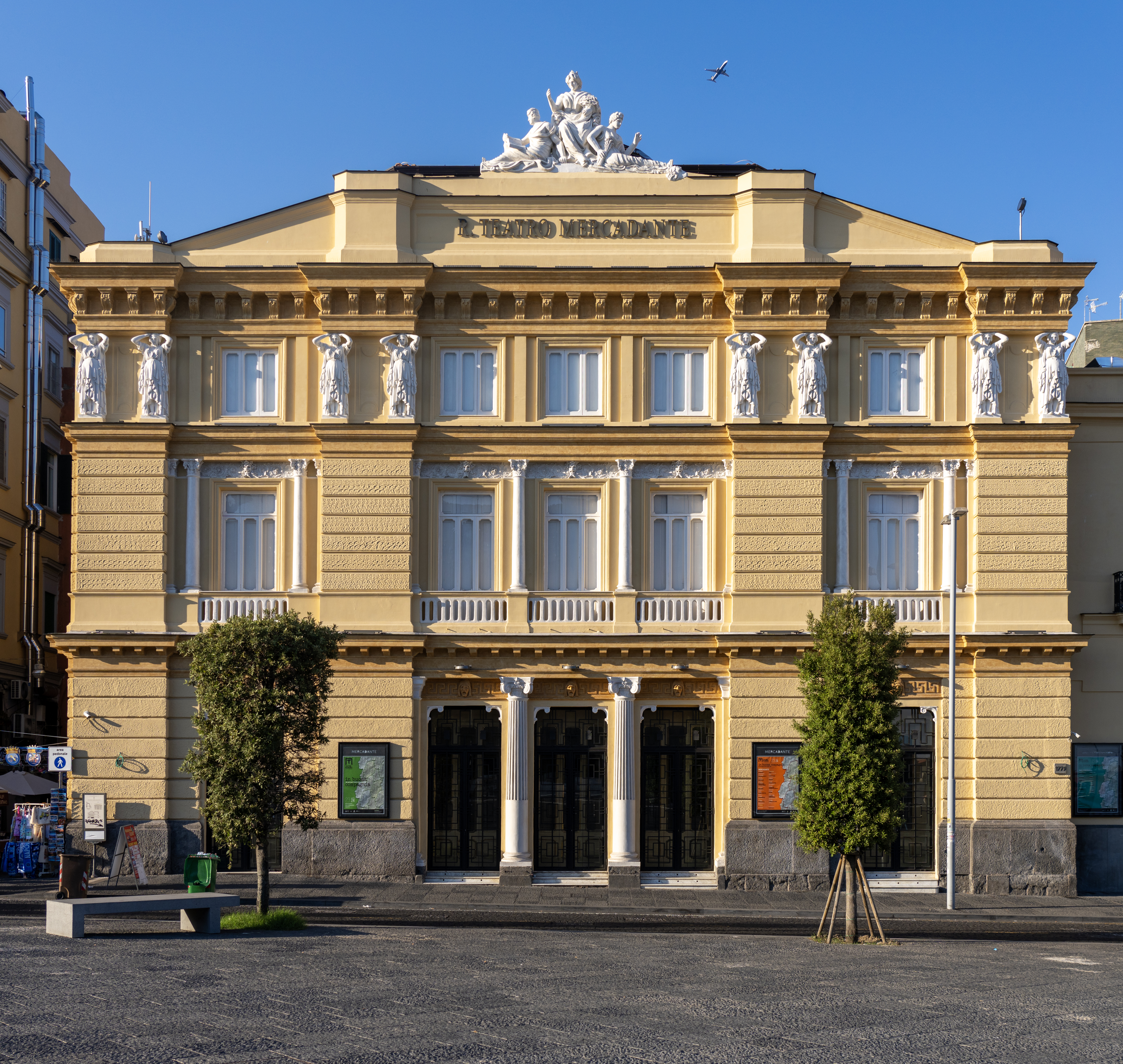
Teatro Mercadante

The Teatro Mercadante, earlier known as Teatro del Fondo, is a theatre in Naples, Italy. It is located on Piazza del Municipio #1, with the front facing the west side of Castel Nuovo and near the Maritime Station. Together with the Teatro San Carlo, it was originally one of the two royal opera houses of the 18th and 19th-century city.

It opened in 1779 as the 'Teatro del Real Fondo di Separazione', with comic operas sung mainly in Tuscan. The Mozart operas Don Giovanni, The Marriage of Figaro and Così fan tutte were performed there (1812-1815) and also a number of French operas under the patronage and influence of Joseph Bonaparte, King of Naples (1806-1808). The theatre was later used by Gioachino Rossini, who became the music director of the royal theatres, Giovanni Pacini and Gaetano Donizetti and many other leading composers.

After a period of relative inactivity, in 1871 it was renamed the Real Teatro Mercadante, after Saverio Mercadante, whereupon opera productions once again flourished at the theatre.

It is now part of the Teatro Stabile Napoli.
