= Luigi Lablache =

Italian opera singer (1794–1858)

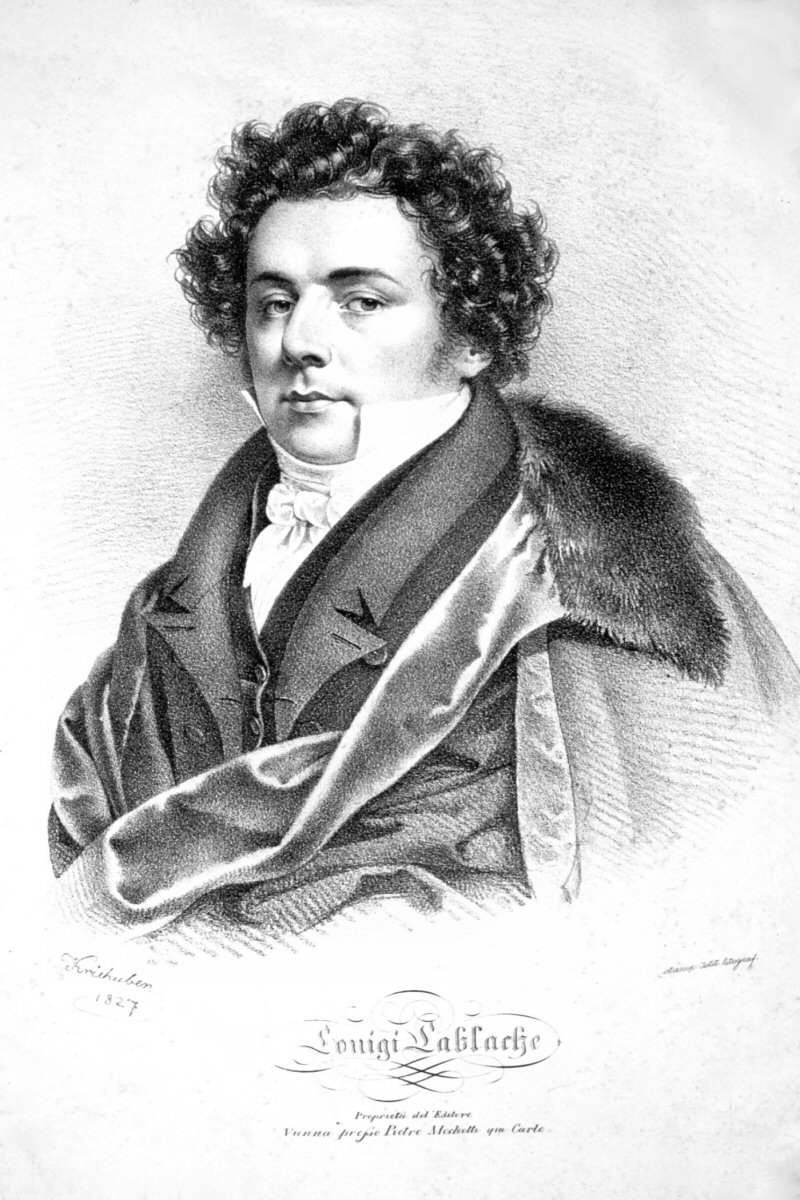
Portrait of Luigi Lablache by Josef Kriehuber (1827)

Luigi Lablache (6 December 1794 – 23 January 1858) was an Italian opera singer of French and Irish ancestry. He was most noted for his comic performances, possessing a powerful and agile bass voice, a wide range, and adroit acting skills: Leporello in Don Giovanni was one of his signature roles.

== Biography ==
Luigi Lablache was born in Naples, the son of Nicolas Lablache, a merchant from Marseille, France, to an Irish lady Rose Anne Maguire. He was educated from 1806 at the Conservatorio della Pietà de' Turchini in Naples, where Gentili taught him the elements of music, and Giovanni Valesi instructed him in singing, while at the same time he studied the violin and cello. He fled the Conservatorio five times in order to pursue an acting career, but each time he was brought back in disgrace. His voice was a beautiful contralto, and just before it broke he sang the solos in Mozart's Requiem on the death of Joseph Haydn in 1809.

Before long he became possessed of a magnificent bass, which gradually increased in volume until at the age of twenty it had attained a compass of two octaves from E-flat below to E-flat above the bass stave. In 1812, when only eighteen, he was engaged at the Teatro di San Carlo, Naples, and appeared in Valentino Fioravanti's La Molinara. From 1812 to 1817, he sang at Palermo. In 1817, at La Scala in Milan, he took the part of Dandini in Rossini's La Cenerentola. The opera Elisa e Claudio was written for him in 1821 by Saverio Mercadante and his position was assured. His reputation spread throughout Europe.

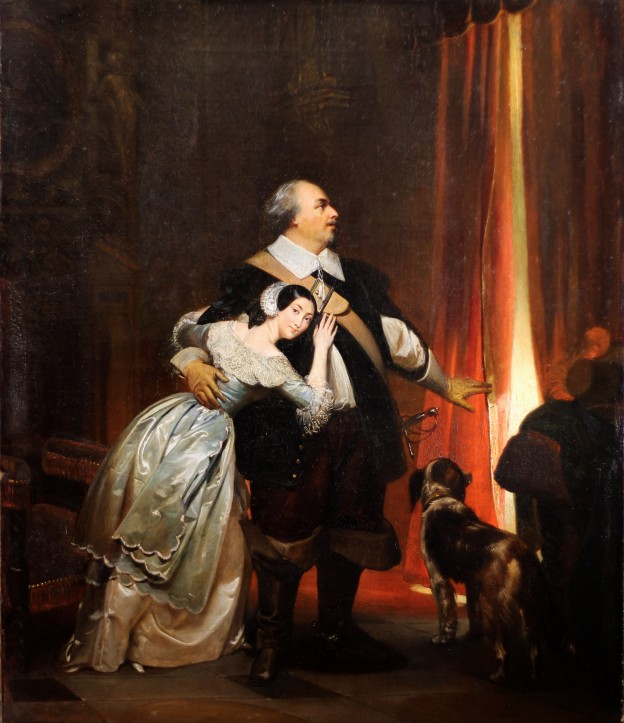
Giulia Grisi as Elvira and Luigi Lablache as Sir Giorgio in Bellini's I puritani at The King's Theatre in London, 1835

From Milan he went to Turin, returned to Milan in 1822, then appeared at Venice, and in 1824 at Vienna. Going back to Naples after an absence of twelve years, he created a great sensation as Assur in Rossini's Semiramide. On 30 March 1830, under Ebers's management, he was first heard in London as Geronimo in Cimarosa's Il matrimonio segreto and thenceforth appeared there annually, also singing in many provincial festivals. In 1827, he met Franz Schubert at the funeral of Beethoven where they were both torchbearers. Schubert wrote three songs in Italian (Op. 83, D. 902) for Lablache, marvellous exercises in Rossinian pastiche; they are among the last songs he ever wrote.

A physically imposing man, his voice was at all times extraordinarily powerful; but he could produce comic, humorous, tender, or sorrowful effects with equal ease and mastery. As an actor, he excelled equally in comic and tragic parts. His chief rôles were Leporello (his greatest part), Geronimo the Podestà in La gazza ladra, Dandini in La Prova d' un' Opera Seria, Henry VIII in Anna Bolena the Doge in Marino Faliero, and Oroveso in Norma. He created the title role in Donizetti's Don Pasquale in 1843 and Massimiliano in Verdi's I masnadieri in 1847. Towards the close of his career he played two new characters of quite different types with great success, Shakespeare's Caliban in Fromental Halévy's La Tempesta and Gritzenko, the Kalmuck, in Scribe's and Meyerbeer's L'étoile du nord.

At the funeral of Beethoven in 1827 he was one of the thirty-two torchbearers who surrounded the coffin, and he also sang in Mozart's Requiem. He sang the same Requiem at Chopin's funeral in 1849. He was the soloist, singing a Lacrimosa, at Bellini's funeral in 1835.

In 1836/37 he taught singing to Princess Victoria of the United Kingdom, the later Queen Victoria.

Luigi Lablache died at Naples on 23 January 1858, and was buried at Maisons-Laffitte, near Paris.

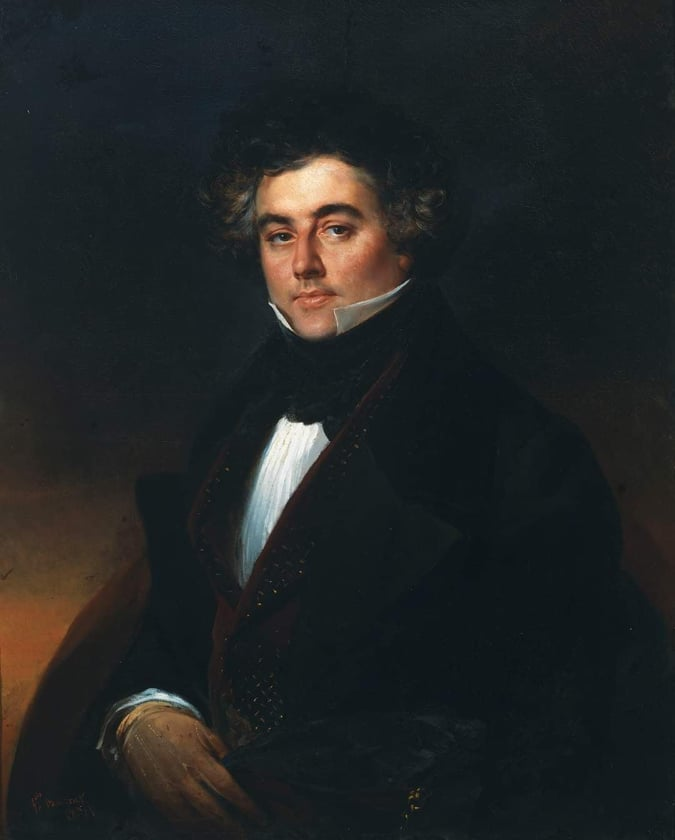
Portrait of Luigi Lablache, by François Bouchot (1831)

Lablache had married the singer Teresa Pinotti in 1813, and they had thirteen children; several of them, notably Frederick Lablache, were also singers. His eldest daughter, Francesca (Cecchina), married the pianist Sigismond Thalberg in 1843, and his younger daughter, Therese, married the opera singer Hans von Rokitansky. The actor Stewart Granger was his great-great-grandson, and the BBC TV Antiques Roadshow expert Bunny Campione is also a descendant.
