= Marco Visconti =

Marco Visconti may refer to:

- Marco Visconti (novel), an 1834 novel by Tommaso Grossi
  - Marco Visconti (opera), an 1854 opera by Errico Petrella
  - Marco Visconti (1925 film), a silent film adaptation directed by Aldo De Benedetti
  - Marco Visconti (1941 film), a sound film adaptation directed by Mario Bonnard
  - Marco Visconti (TV series), a 1975 television adaptation
