= Carlo Negrini =

Italian opera singer (1826–1865)

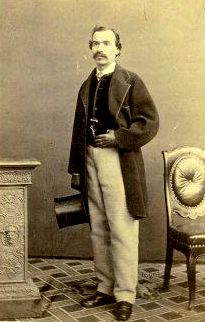
- Carlo Negrini in 1862
- Born: Carlo Villa; 26 June 1826; Piacenza, Duchy of Parma and Piacenza
- Died: 14 March 1865 (aged 38); Naples, Kingdom of Italy
- Occupation: Tenor
- Known for: Created role of Gabriele Adorno in Verdi's Simon Boccanegra

Carlo Negrini (24 June 1826 – 14 March 1865) was an Italian spinto tenor and creator of Gabriele Adorno in Verdi’s opera Simon Boccanegra.

== Early career ==
Born as Carlo Villa to a humble family in Piacenza, Negrini studied first at the Regia Scuola di Musica in Parma (now the Parma Conservatory). A sponsor made it possible for him to study in Milan with Bartolomeo Prati. The impresario Angelo Boracchi advised him to change his name to Carlo Negrini, claiming it will bring him luck. Negrini started singing in the La Scala chorus, soon making his début as a soloist in 1847 as Jacopo in Giuseppe Verdi's I due Foscari. From 1850 on, he sang major roles in Italy and Europe.

== European career and role creations ==
In 1850 Negrini sang Gastone in Gerusalemme, the Italian-language version of Giuseppe Verdi's Jérusalem, a French language remake of I Lombardi alla prima crociata, in La Scala. In 1851 he sang he sang Rodolfo in Verdi's Luisa Miller, Duca in Verdi's Rigoletto and the title role of Donizetti's Poliuto at the Teatro Riccardi in Bergamo (1851). In 1852, he appeared as Pollione in Norma and the title role of Verdi's Ernani at Covent Garden. In Bologna he sang in Balfe's La zingara and in Verdi's Luisa Miller. In Venice La Fenice he sang in Errico Petrella's Marco Visconti (1854) and Giuseppe Apolloni's L'ebreo.

In La Scala he created the roles of Don Rodrigo in Giovanni Pacini’s Il Cid, (1852), Gabriele Adorno in Verdi’s Simon Boccanegra (1857), Glauco in Errico Petrella’s Jone (1858) and Cola di Rienzi, in Achille Peri’s Rienzi, (1862).

Other roles he created were Adel-Muza in Giuseppe Apolloni’s L’ebreo in La Fenice, (1857) and Galieno in Errico Petrella’s Morosina ovvero L'ultimo de' Falieri in Naples (1860). In the spring of 1860 he created the title role of Luigi Moroni's Amleto at the teatro Apollo in Rome, singing with the aging Filippo Coletti as Cladio. A year later, again with Coletti, he created the role of Icilio in Petrella's Virginia in Naples.

== Premature death ==
Having sung most of Verdi's operas written in Negrini's short lifetime, Negrini paved the way as model for the Verdi tenor known today. Negrini was treated like a modern-day star. In Palermo he received the vast fee of 22,500 lire, unheard of at the time. In 1865, returning home from performing in Spain, he suffered a stroke. A second stroke, while in Paris, left him bedridden for nine months until he died at the age of forty.

== Verdi and Negrini ==
Negrini was a baritonal tenor. The tessitura for the role of Gabriele Adorno he created was so low that Verdi later authorised transpositions up for the tenor Emilio Pancani in 1869 and adapted the part himself for Francesco Tamagno in 1881. Verdi appreciated Negrini's talent and stipulated in a contract Negrini's participation in an opera project for Naples. Verdi also sent his friend and student Emanuele Muzio to Venice to listen to Negrini in Appoloni's Adelchi. "Negrini is always a great artist, he is a genius", Muzio reported; "When Negrini is well he is a real gem."

== Appreciation ==
The Belgian critic and musicologist François-Joseph Fétis described Negrini's voice as 'superb, powerful and well produced' (“superbe, puissante et bien timbrée”). Francesco Regli in his biographical dictionary claimed 'Negrini possesses an imposing voice with lots of soul, taking possession of the stage: qualities needed to be able to execute adequately the music composed nowadays, where less than a mere singer, a great actor is needed. Thus his voice showed no fatigue despite the lengthy labours!' (“Il Negrini possiede una voce prepotente e molt'anima, ed è padrone della scena: doti necessarie per poter eseguire con generale soddisfacimento le musiche del giorno, nelle quali vi vuole, non men che il cantante, l'attore. Così la sua voce non fosse un po' stanca dalle lunghe fatiche!”). The Musical World of 1854 reports on his Covent Garden performance: "Negrini is the most perfect Carlo that can be imagined; He excited the wonder and delight of the audience by the fullness of his tone, the richness of his voice, and still more by his inimitable accent, his energy, and the perfection of his acting.

== Roles created ==
- Ramiro, in Zulima, Bernardo Geraci, Reggio Teatro Carolino, Palermo, 1851
- Silvio, in Matilde Bentivoglio, Pietro Platania, Reggio Teatro Carolino, Palermo, 1851
- Don Rodrigo, in Il Cid (Giovanni Pacini), Teatro alla Scala, Milan, March 12, 1853
- Gilberto in Editta (Antonio Buzzi), Teatro la Fenice, 1854
- Adel-Muza, in L'ebreo (Giuseppe Apolloni), Teatro la Fenice, Venice, January 23, 1855
- Adelchi, in Adelchi (Giuseppe Apolloni), gran Teatro La Fenice, 1856
- Ulrico, in Valenzio Candiano (Tomaso Benvenuti), teatro Sociale di Mantova, 1856
- Gabriele Adorno, in Simon Boccanegra (Giuseppe Verdi), Teatro la Fenice, Venice, March 12, 1857
- Glauco, in Jone ovvero L'ultimo giorno di Pompei (Errico Petrella), Teatro alla Scala, Milan, January 26, 1858
- Adalberto, in Berengario d'Ivrea (Francesco Lutti), Teatro alla Scala, Milan, 1858
- Galieno, in Morosina ovvero L'ultimo de' Falieri (Errico Petrella), Teatro San Carlo, Naples, January 6, 1860
- Decio, in Mirinda (Salvatore Pappalardo), Teatro San Carlo, Naples, March 6, 1860
- Amleto, in Amleto (Luigi Moroni), Teatro Apollo, Rome, spring 1860
- Icilio, in Virginia (Errico Petrella), Teatro San Carlo, Naples, July 23, 1861
- Ezzelino Cornaro, L'uscocco (Francesco Petrocini), regio teatro alla Scala, 1862.
- Ariodante, in Ginevra di Scozia (Giuseppe Rota), Gran teatro Trieste, automn 1862
- Cola di Rienzi, in Rienzi (Achille Peri), Teatro alla Scala, Milan, December 26, 1862
- Loreno in Aurora di Nevers (Giuseppe Sinico), Teatro Carcano, Milan, 1863

== Verdi roles (incomplete list) ==
- Gaston in Gerusalemme, Milan, 1850
- Duca in Rigoletto, Ancona, 1854
- Giovanna d'arco in Ancona
- Gabriele Adorno in Simon Boccanegra Venice, 1857
- Luisa Miller, Bologna
