= Giovanni Guicciardi =

Italian opera singer (1819–1883)

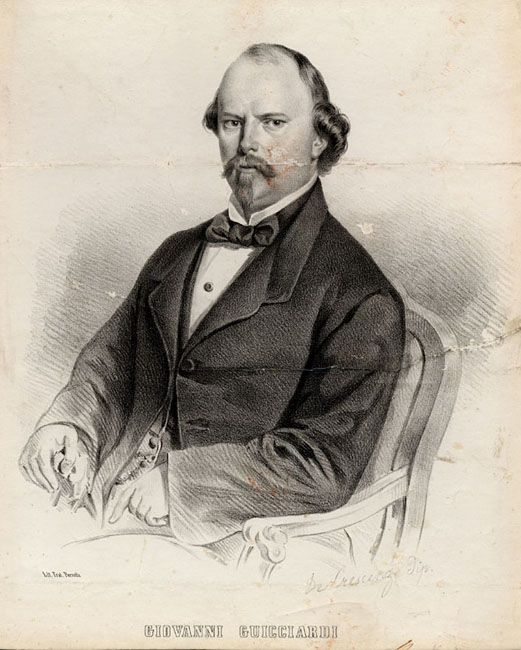
Giovanni Guicciardi

Giovanni Guicciardi (12 January 1819 – 4 October 1883) was an Italian opera singer who sang leading baritone roles in the opera houses of Italy and Portugal. He is most remembered today for having created the role of Count di Luna in Verdi's Il trovatore. He created also several other leading roles in operas by lesser known Italian composers. Guicciardi accumulated a considerable fortune during the course of his career. After his retirement from the stage, he taught without payment in music schools in his native city, Reggio Emilia, and presided over a charity for orphaned musicians. He died in San Polo d'Enza at the age of 64.

== Roles created ==
- Licinio Grasso in Foroni's I gladiatori, Teatro della Canobbiana, Milan, 7 October 1851
- Fulvio Rigo in Pietro Vallini's L'orfanella, Teatro della Canobbiana, Milan, 1 November 1851
- Ivano Bolliol in Giuseppe Winter's Matilde di Scozia, Teatro della Canobbiana, Milan, 25 November 1852
- Count di Luna in Verdi's Il trovatore, Teatro Apollo, Rome, 19 January 1853
- Arbace in Petrella's Jone, La Scala, Milan, 26 January 1858
- Conte Monmelliano in Angelo Villanis's Una notte di festa, La Fenice, Venice, 16 February 1859
- Giovanni Orseolo in Petrella's Morosina ovvero L'ultimo de' Falieri, Teatro San Carlo, Naples, 6 January 1860
- Douglas in Pappalardo's Mirinda, Teatro San Carlo, Naples, 6 March 1860
- Il Duca in Petrella's Il folletto di Gresy, Teatro del Fondo, Naples, 28 August 1860
- Stefano Colonna in Achille Peri's Rienzi, La Scala, Milan, 26 December 1862
