= Enrico Barberi =

Italian sculptor (1850–1941)

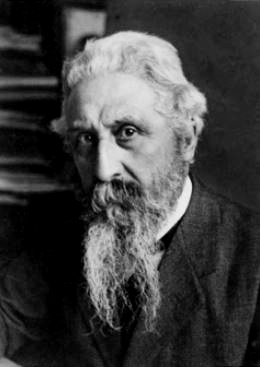
Enrico Barberi (date unknown)

Enrico Barberi (Bologna, 22 July 1850 – Bologna, 1941) was an Italian sculptor.

== Biography ==
Enrico Barberi attended the Academy of Fine Arts in Bologna and was a student of Salvino Salvini. Between 1871 and 1873 he did an apprenticeship in Florence with the sculptor Giovanni Dupré. In 1876 he distinguished himself among the promises of the Academy of Fine Arts exhibiting the great plaster Otriade. He taught at the Institute of Fine Arts and then, between 1895 and 1921, at the Academy of Fine Arts in Bologna, holding the chair of sculpture. Under his direction were formed generations of sculptors, some of whom will be figures of national and international importance. Among the many: Silverio Montaguti, Giuseppe Romagnoli, Farpi Vignoli, Antonio Alberghini}, Cleto Tomba and Giuseppe Virgili.

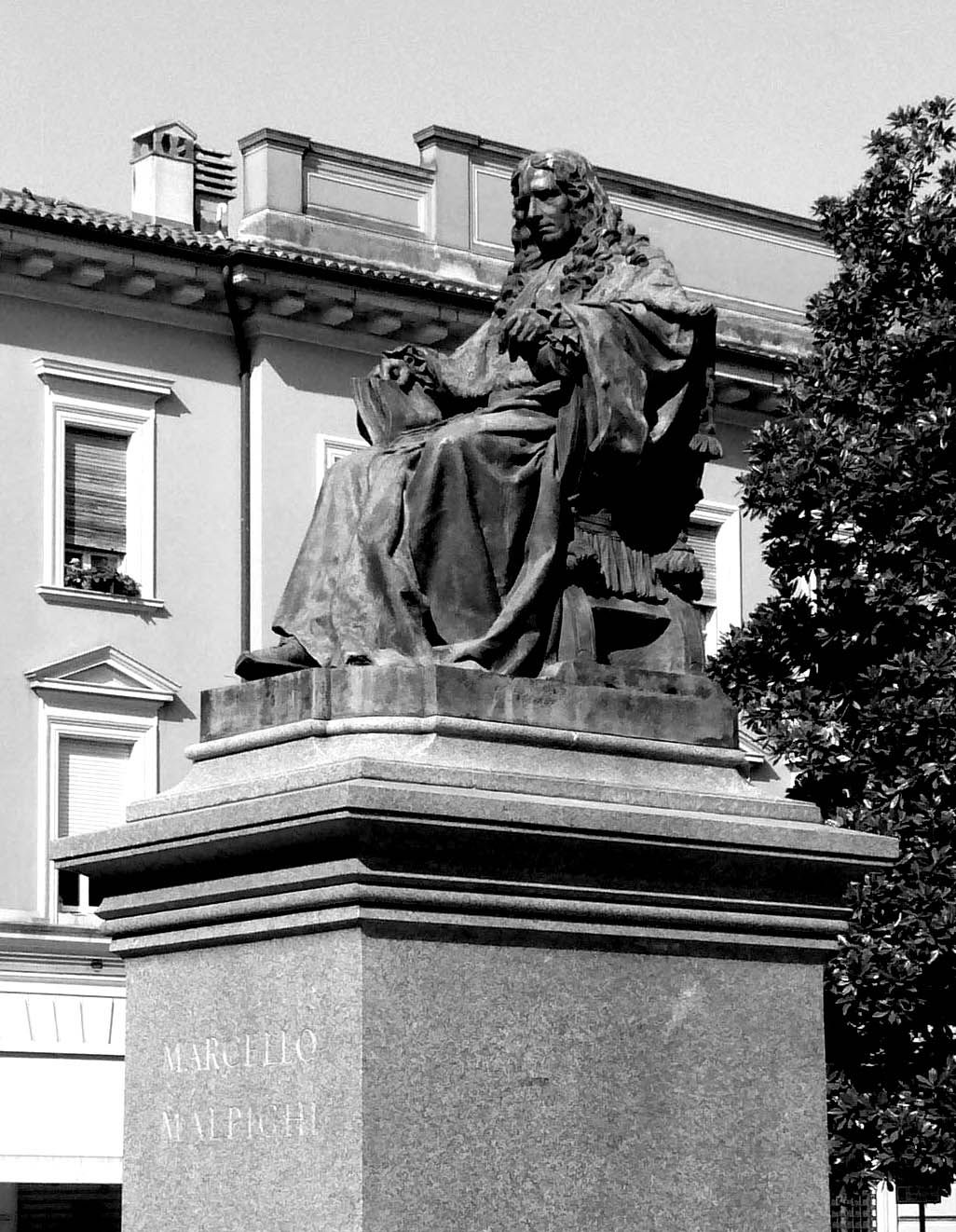
Enrico Barberi. Bronze monument to Marcello Malpighi in the square of Crevalcore.

He was among the participants of the artistic guild of the Aemilia Ars, collaborating and making friends with Achille Casanova, Alfonso Rubbiani, Luigi Serra, Alfredo Tartarini. The poet and art critic Alfonso Panzacchi was a sincere admirer of his and Barberi made at least two portraits of him. He was for a long time professor of sculpture at the Collegio Artistico Venturoli in Bologna, where he left many works and models of his sculptures. It is possible to admire an ample catalog of his marbles - covering all his long activity - in the Certosa of Bologna. Inside the Galleria degli Angeli there are two masterpieces, the Monument of Raffaele Bisteghi (1891) and the one dedicated to the opera singers Adelaide and Erminia Borghi-Mamo (1894). In the Church of San Girolamo there is the refined monument to Cardinal Vincenzo Moretti (1882). Among the rare public works is the bronze Monument to Marcello Malpighi (1897), placed in the square of Crevalcore. In 1897 he was commissioned by the mayor to draw up a report on the "state of health" of the Neptune Fountain of Bologna in Piazza Maggiore. The sculptor advised to keep the statue in a museum and replace it with a copy. Until 1919 Barberi remained an official consultant for Neptune.

== Main works at the Monumental Cemetery of Certosa di Bologna ==
- Hall of the Pantheon of the illustrious men: statues of the friend-painter Luigi Serra, of Francesco Rocchi and Paolo Venturini
- Borghi Mamo Monument, Gallery of the Angels
- Monument of Raffaele Bisteghi
- Monument of Cardinal Vincenzo Moretti
- Monument of Rivani Family
- Monument of Camillo Zambeccari Zanchini
- Monument to Emilio Putti, Cloister V
- Rivani Monument, Cloister III
- Trombetti Monument, Galleria degli Angeli
- Cavazza Monument, Gallery of the Angels
- Garelli Monument, Gallery of Angels
- Vespignanni Cell, Gallery of Angels
- Cella Facchini, Gallery of the Angels
- Pezzoli Monument, Cloister VII
- Berlinzani Monument, Cloister VII
- Veratti Monument, Cloister VII
- Lorenzini Monument, Cloister VII
- Agostini Monument, Cloister VII
- Guidicini Monument, Cloister VII
- Pizzoli Monument, Cloister VII
- Pezzoli Monument, Cloister VII
- Faccioli Brugnoli Monument, Cloister IX
- Monument to Goffredo Franceschi, Corsia del Colombario

== Other works ==
- Promoteo, kept at the Academy of Fine Arts, Bologna
- San Francesco, Capuchin church, Imola
- Bust of Enrico Panzacchi, 1812, for the gardens in Bologna
- Several funerary monuments in the cemetery of Cesena.

== Donations ==
In 1987 his nephew Mario donated to the Galleria d'Arte Moderna of Bologna documents and drawings by Luigi Serra, probably received by Barberi directly from the painter.

== Gallery ==
Monumenti funebri nella Certosa di Bologna

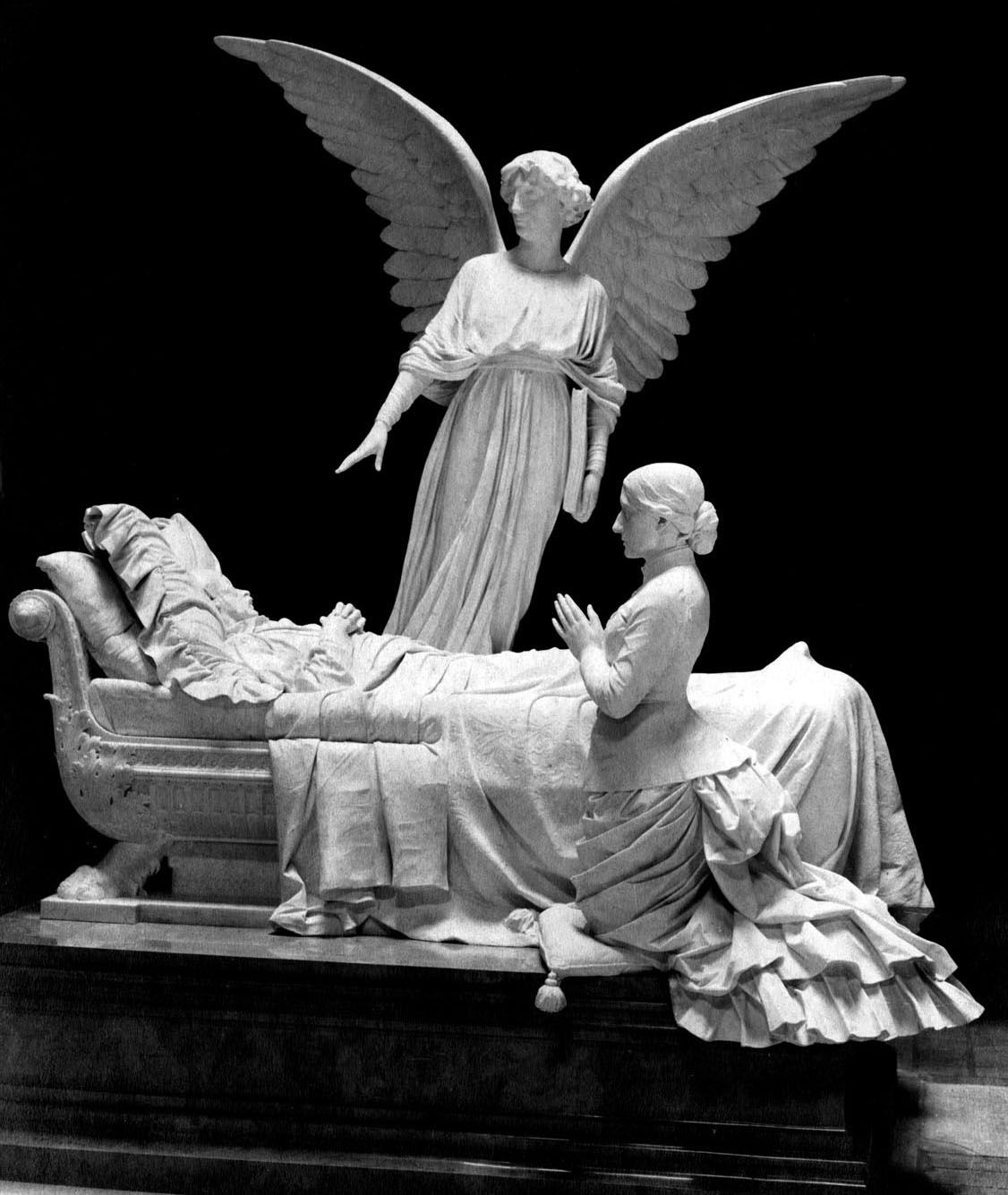
Monumento a Raffaele Bisteghi, 1885 ca., 1991.

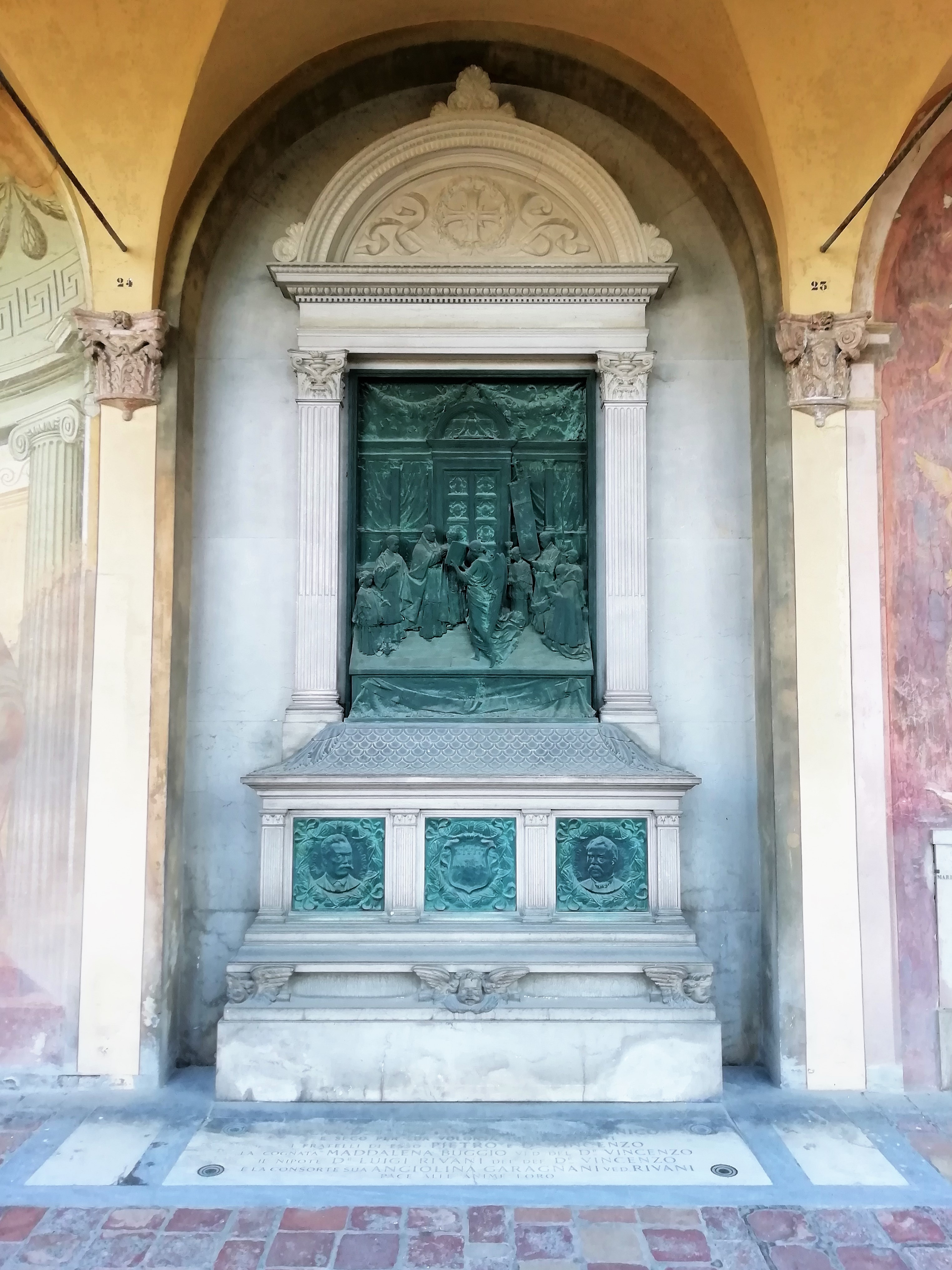
Monumento Rivani, ch. III

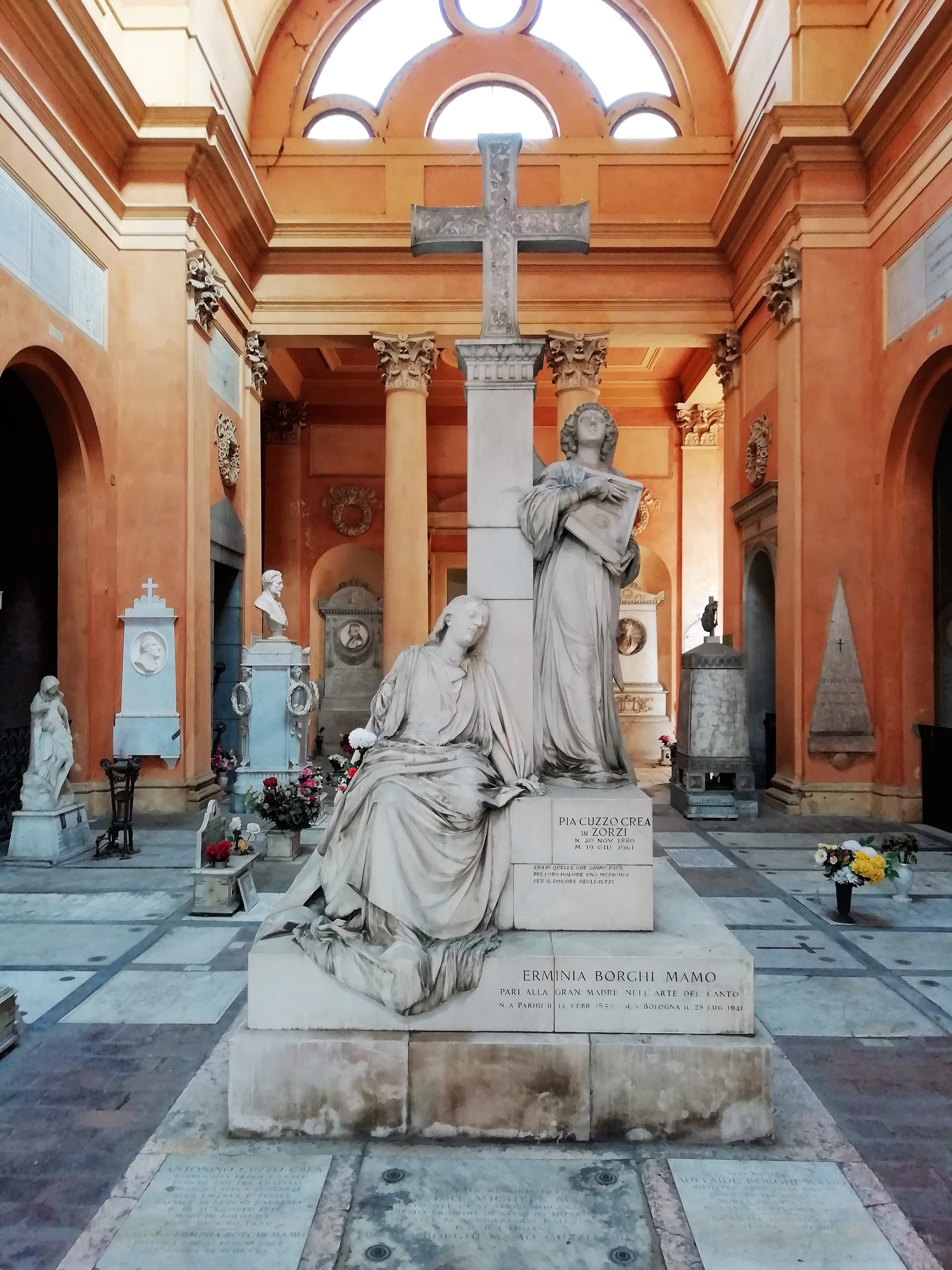
Monumento Borghi-Mamo

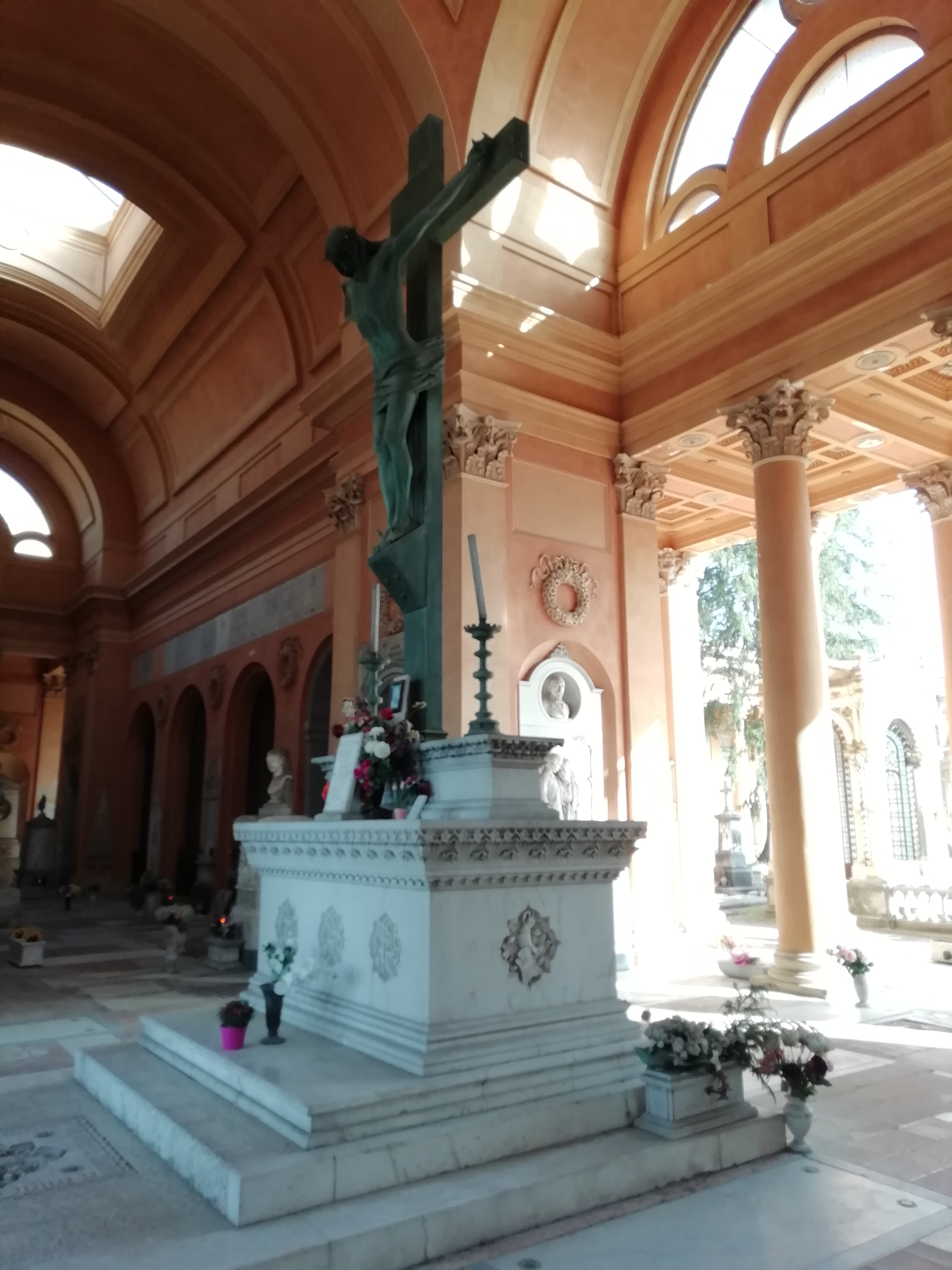
Monumento Cavazza

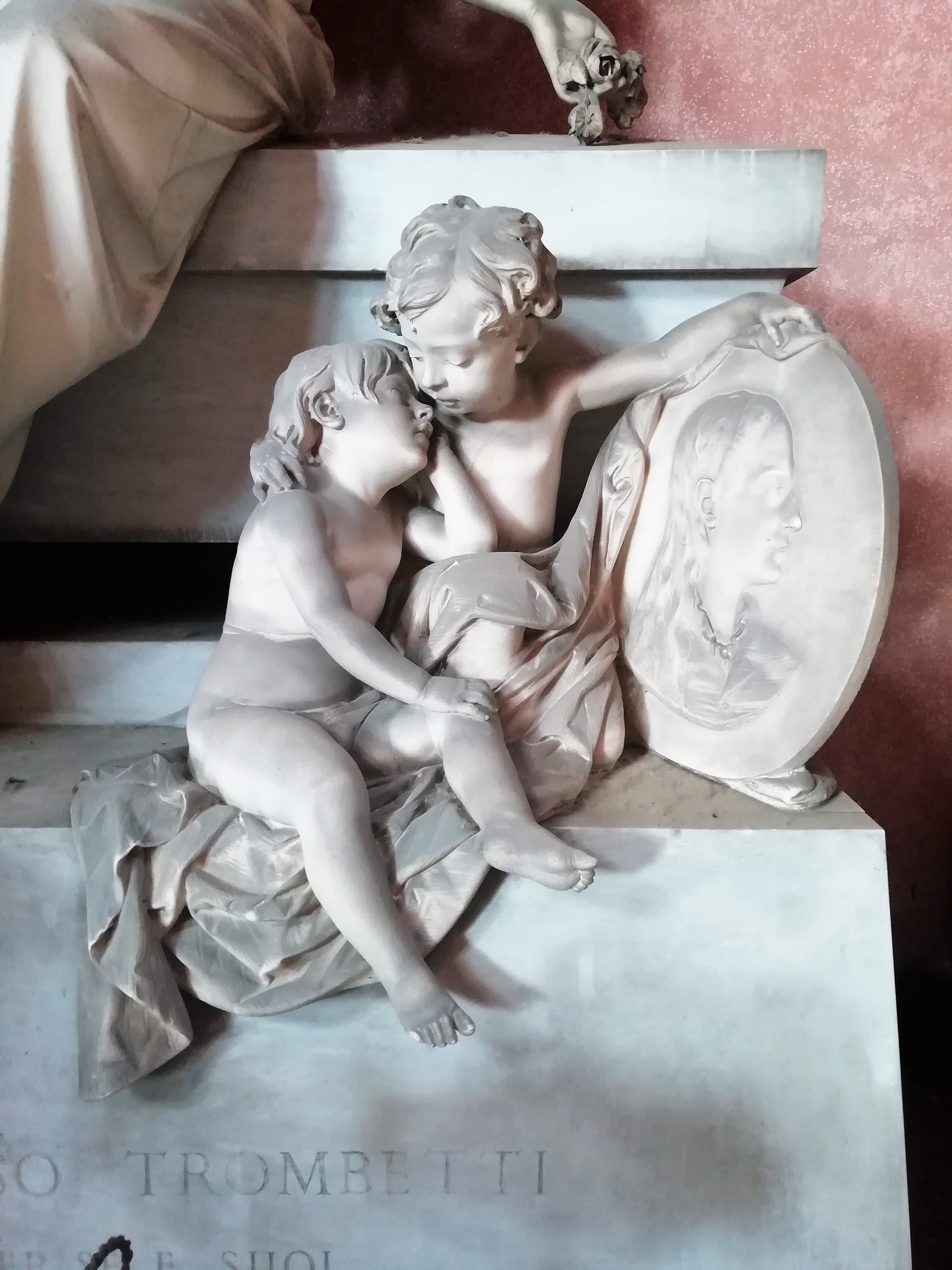
Monumento Trombetti (detail)

== Bibliography ==
- Coscienza urbana e urbanistica tra due millenni, vol. 1., Fatti bolognesi dal 1796 alla prima guerra mondiale, Bologna, San Giorgio in Poggiale, 11 dicembre 1993-13 febbraio 1994, a cura di Franca Varignana, Bologna, Grafis, 1993, p. 211.
- Stefano Tumidei, La scultura dell'Ottocento in Certosa, in La Certosa, immortalità della memoria, Bologna, Compositori, 1998.
- Roberto Martorelli, Cento anni di scultura bolognese. L'album fotografico Belluzzi e le sculture del Museo civico del Risorgimento, num. monografico del “Bollettino del Museo del Risorgimento”, LIII (2008).
- S. Pezzoli, O. Piraccini (a cura di), L'artista e l'amico: ritorno a Luigi Serra - opere e documenti dalla raccolta di Enrico Guizzardi, Bologna, Compositori, 2008.
- Roberto Martorelli (a cura di), La Certosa di Bologna - Un libro aperto sulla storia, catalogo della mostra, Tipografia Moderna, Bologna, 2009.
- Beatrice Buscaroli, Roberto Martorelli (a cura di), Luce sulle tenebre - Tesori preziosi e nascosti dalla Certosa di Bologna, catalogo della mostra, Bologna, Bononia University Press, 2010.
- Alfonso Panzetta (2003). Nuovo dizionario degli scultori italiani dell'Ottocento e del primo Novecento. Torino: Ad Arte. p. 71. ISBN 88-89082-00-3.
- Benedetta Basevi e Mirko Nottoli (a cura di), Enrico Barberi e la fontana del Nettuno: il fondo di disegni Barberi nelle collezioni d'arte e di storia della Fondazione Cassa di risparmio in Bologna, Fondazione Cassa di risparmio in Bologna, Bononia University Press, 2018 ISBN 9788869233241
