= Borghi-Mamo =

Borghi-Mamo may refer to:

- Adelaide Borghi-Mamo (1826–1901), Italian operatic mezzo-soprano
- Erminia Borghi-Mamo (1855–1941), talian operatic soprano
