= Baruzzi =

Baruzzi is a surname. Notable people with the surname include:

- Cincinnato Baruzzi (1796–1878), Italian sculptor
- Francesca Baruzzi (born 1998), Argentine alpine skier

== See also ==
- Barluzzi
