= Adelaide Borghi-Mamo =

Italian opera singer (1826–1901)

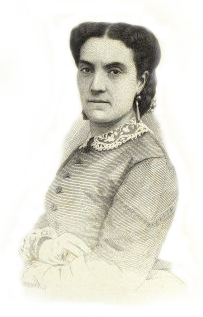
- Adelaide Borghi-Mamo
- Born: 9 August 1826; Bologna, Italy
- Died: 29 September 1901 (aged 75); Bologna, Italy
- Occupation: Italian operatic mezzo-soprano
- Years active: 1840s–1880s

Adelaide Borghi-Mamo (9 August 1826 – 29 September 1901) was an Italian operatic mezzo-soprano who had an active international career from the 1840s through the 1880s. She was married to tenor Michele Mamo and their daughter, soprano Erminia Borghi-Mamo, also had a successful singing career.

== Life and career ==
Born in Bologna, Borghi-Mamo studied singing in Milan with Francesca Maffei Festa before making her professional opera debut in 1843 at the opera house in Urbino as Bianca in Saverio Mercadante's Il giuramento. The following year she joined the roster of singers at the Teatro Vittorio Emanuele in Messina. She was soon invited to make guest appearances with major opera houses throughout Italy.

In 1851 Borghi-Mamo portrayed the role of Morna in the world premiere of Giovanni Pacini's Malvina di Scozia at the Teatro di San Carlo. She returned there in 1853 to create the role of Olimpia in the premiere of Saverio Mercadante's Statira and the role of Odetta in the premiere of Pacini's Romilda di Provenza. She was also heard at that house that year as Azucena in Giuseppe Verdi's Il trovatore and in the title role in Gaetano Braga's Alina. On 23 August 1853 she performed in the world premiere of Lauro Rossi's L'alchimista at the Teatro del Fondo in Naples. She was also heard in Vienna in 1853. In 1854 she sang in another premiere at the Teatro di San Carlo: the role of Tremacoldo in Errico Petrella's Marco Visconti.

In 1857 Borghi-Mamo sang the role of Azucena in the French premiere of Il trovatore at the Théâtre-Italien in Paris. She was committed to that theatre through 1856 where she was particularly admired in three roles in operas by Gioachino Rossini: the Contessa d'Arco in Matilde di Shabran, Rosina in The Barber of Seville, and the title role in La Cenerentola. In 1856 she made her debut at the Paris Opera as Leonor de Guzmán in Gaetano Donizetti's La favorite. She remained committed to that house for the next four years where she notably created roles in the world premieres of Fromental Halévy's La magicienne (1858, Mélusine), Félicien David's Herculanum (1859, Olympia), and Gaetano Braga's Margherita la mendicante (1859, Margherita).

In 1860 Borghi-Mamo performed in London for the first time as Azucena and Leonor de Guzmán at Her Majesty's Theatre. In November 1860 she performed at the Teatro Comunale di Bologna as Fidès in that theatre's first presentation of Giacomo Meyerbeer's Le prophète. In 1861 she sang in the premiere of Achille Peri's L'espiazione at La Scala. She returned to that house on 26 December 1862 to sing the role of Giulia Raselli in the world premiere of Achille Peri's Rienzi. In 1861–1862 she was again committed to the Teatro Regio di Torino where she was heard as Desdemona in Rossini's Otello, Federica in Verdi's Luisa Miller, Fidès, and Rosina. In 1870 she sang the title role in Pacini's Saffo at La Fenice. She returned to the Théâtre-Italien in Paris in 1876 to perform Preziosilla in Verdi's La forza del destino. In 1879 she appeared at the Teatro Real in Madrid as Beatrice in the world premiere of Emilio Usiglio's Le donne curiose. She remained active on the stage up into the 1880s. She died in Bologna in 1901 at the age of 75.
