= Carlo Sabatini =

Carlo Sabatini may refer to:

- Carlo Sabatini (football manager)
- Carlo Sabatini (actor)
