= Marco Visconti (opera) =

1854 opera by Errico Petrella

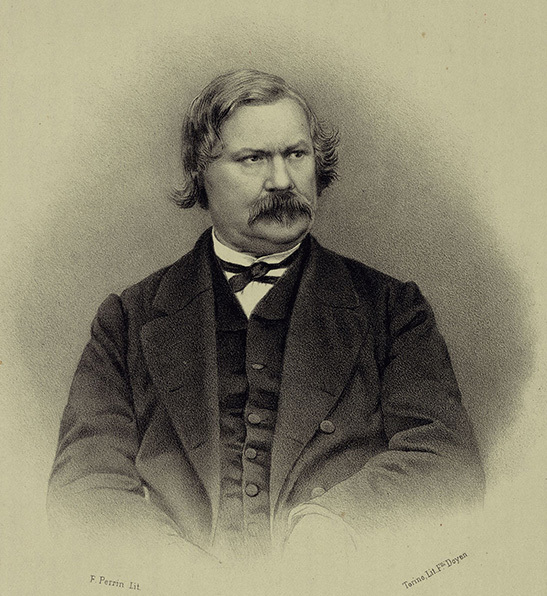
The composer

Marco Visconti, is an opera in 3 acts by Italian composer Errico Petrella with a libretto by Domenico Bolognese based on the 1834 novel of the same name by Tommaso Grossi. It premiered in 1854 at the Teatro di San Carlo in Naples and was met with unanimous praise.

== Performance history ==
Despite being quite popular in its first years of existence, it eventually fell into obscurity and has since not been performed for over 100 years. No recording of the opera, or its numbers, is known to exist (apart from piano reductions of the overture and the tenor's act 1 romanza), but its vocal score is available at the International Music Score Library Project (IMSLP) website.

== Roles ==
Roles, voice types, premiere cast
Character	Voice type	Premiere cast
Marco Visconti; Nobleman in love with Bice	baritone	Gaetano Ferri
Ottorino Visconti; His younger cousin and Bice's lover	tenor	Gaetano Fraschini
Bice del Balzo; Young noblewoman	soprano	Rosina Penco
Lodrisio Visconti; Ottorino's Brother	tenor	Corrado Laudano
Oldrado; Lodrisio and Ottorino's father	bass	Marco Arati
Tremacoldo; Court jester	contralto en travesti	Adelaide Borghi-Mamo
Laura; Bice's lady in waiting	mezzo-soprano	Anna Salvetti

== Synopsis ==
Lombardy, 1329

Count del Balzo's quarters. Set design for Act 1 Scene 1

Marco falls in love with Bice, a young noblewoman whose mother he had also courted years prior. His love is unrequited, as Bice is already in a relationship with his younger cousin, Ottorino. Marco challenges Ottorino to a duel for Bice's hand, but Bice ultimately decides to sacrifice herself in order to avoid seeing either of the men die. Marco and Otorrino embrace and forgive each other as Bice dies in Otorrino's arms.

== Principal numbers ==
Act 1

- Cavatina: "In placida notte di stelle raggianti" (Bice)
- Romanza: "D'ogni terrena beltà l'incanto" (Ottorino)
- Aria: "Tu beato alfin mi rendi" (Marco)

Act 2

- Canzonetta: "Rondinella pellegrina" (Tremacoldo)
- Arioso: "Ei mi appar leggiadro e santo" (Marco)
- Racconto: "Ecco il campo della sfida" (Tremacoldo)

Act 3

- Aria: "Come un'aura in sul mattino" (Ottorino)
