= Farpi Vignoli =

Italian sculptor

Olympic medal record

Art competitions
Gold medal – first place	1936 Berlin	Statues

Farpi Vignoli (21 August 1907 – 3 November 1997) was a 20th-century Italian sculptor who was born and died in Bologna.

== Biography ==
Farpi Vignoli was born in Bologna in August 1907, the son of Callisto Vignoli, a carpenter, and Ersilia Tagliavini, a homemaker. He was the youngest of three brothers. He spent his childhood and early adolescence in a house near the Arcoveggio racecourse (which would inspire him to sculpt both his "Il Guidatore di Sulki" (The Sulky Driver)" and for his "Horse"). In 1919, he was admitted to the College Venturoli, where he studied architecture, painting and sculpture, following sculptor Enrico Barberi's teachings. In this period Vignoli formed a close friendship with Paolo Manaresi and a friendship with the sculptor Luciano Minguzzi. He continued in the academy with the same teacher Ercole Drei, who was busy sculpting the marble images of Liberty and Victory for the Certosa di Bologna monastery in Bologna. After concluding his studies at Bologne's art academy, the Accademia di Belle Arti in 1934, he gave a public exposition of his work, thereby launching his sculpting career in Bologna.

In the second "Quadriennale" art exhibition in Rome in 1935 (on invitation of the founder Cipriano Efisio Oppo), Vignoli's work "The Sulky Driver" was awarded the right to participate to the 1936 Berlin Olympiad exhibition. In subsequent years he produced "The Tennis player" in 1936, the "Shot of Rope" in 1937, and "The Jumper" in 1938, this last piece suggestively suspending motion in equilibrium between sky and earth.

In 1936, he won the gold medal in the art competitions of the Olympic Games for his "Guidatore di Sulky" ("The Sulky Driver").

At this point, Vignoli changed his style and moved away from sport subjects. In 1939, he introduced to the Third Roman Quadriennale his "Prelude of Love", opening a new period of more eclectic creativity. He created two gigantic bas-reliefs for the façade of "The Farmers House" (known today as the Kamero Aliancano de Ijobo) in Bologna. In 1940, Vignoli won with his piece "Four Horses", the façade of EUR, in Rome, and then two great trophies for the same complex. In 1941, his composed his portrait of a friend, the poet Alfonso Gatto.

== The resumption of activity ==
In the immediate postwar period, a new generation grew in rebellion against the previous period. In this phase, Vignoli devoted himself passionately to watercolor painting, his favorite technique since college. His work was surprisingly innovative in its chromatic use and material principles, achieving brightness and tones more allied with the fresco technique, to the point that Italian artist and writer Virgilio Guidi called the results, "a true ransom" toward other "nobler techniques".

In the 1950s, Vignoli returned to sculpting with various works, "Grave Frassetto", in the Certosa di Bologna monastery in Bologna, portraits of American actors, including Tyrone Power and film director Henry King, "Grave Ennio Gnudi" (Mayor of Bologna in the 1920s) again in the monastery, the bronze "Monument to the Bersaglieri Fallen in Russia" (Bologna); his "Mother", and other works. In 1957, he planned and directed construction of the architectural complex for the Art Academy in Bologna, which included the Theater for the School of Scenography, which was very appreciated by architect Gabor Acs. This was followed by other sculptural commissions, "The Stele to the Cripples of War" bronze (Park S. Violet, Bologna), the Monument of "St. Francis and "The Wolf" (Gubbio), bronze; the Ciborium of the Cathedral of Casalecchio, bronze, "Mariarosa, the Young Teacher" marble (Bologne Monastery), and "The Horse" (Castel S. Pietro) a very realistic bronze. In his final period of activity in the 1980s and 1990s came new sport subjects in bronze, "Hang-gliding", "Windsurfer", "Giacomo Agostini", "Björn Borg", and "Motocross".

== Other artistic events ==
- 1936 First prize, "Curlandese" National Contest of Painting.
- 1936 Award in the National Contest for the Desk to the High Artistic School in Bologna.
- 1936 Appointed to the "Academic Clementino"
- 1936 Guest artist at the "Venetian Biennal"
- 1937 Winner of the National Sculpture Contest in Baruzzi
- 1938 Guest artist at the "Venetian Biennal"
- 1939-40 International exposure in New York City, USA.
- 1946 Guest artist at the "Venetian Biennal"
- 1946 Exhibition of watercolors at the Royal Academy of London, UK.
- 1947 Guest artist at the "Quadriennale Romana"
- 1950 Guest artist at the Venetian Biennal exhibition.
- 1951 Exhibition of watercolors in the "Gallery Bolzani", Milan, Italy.
- 1968 "Cucchi" grave (Bologna Monastery).

== Bibliographical mentions ==
Eugenio Riccoboni, author of the anthology "Rome in Art" in 1942, presents the first useful elements for reconstructing Vignoli's artistic personality among sculptors in the modern age. Riccoboni also mentions Vignoli in his 1949 book about Francesco Sapori, Modern Italian Sculpture.
