= Barluzzi =

Barluzzi is an Italian surname. Notable people with the surname include:

- Antonio Barluzzi (1884–1960), Italian architect
- Dario Barluzzi (1935–2021), Italian soccer player and manager

== See also ==
- Baruzzi
