= Jone (opera) =

Opera by Errico Petrella

Jone, ossia L'ultimo giorno di Pompei is an opera in four acts by Errico Petrella. The Italian-language libretto was by Giovanni Peruzzini, after Edward Bulwer-Lytton's famous novel The Last Days of Pompeii.

== Performance history ==
The opera was premiered at La Scala on 26 January 1858. It was an immediate success, not only all over Italy, but in the rest of the world as well. It remained in the repertory for close to 50 years, being last given in Caracas in 1981. This performance has been recorded and issued both on LP and CD.

== Roles ==
Roles, voice types, premiere cast
Role	Voice type	Premiere cast 26 January 1858
Jone	soprano	Augusta Albertini
Nidia	mezzo-soprano	Carmelina Poch
Glauco	tenor	Carlo Negrini
Arbace	baritone	Giovanni Guicciardi
Burbo	bass	Annibale Biacchi
Dirce	mezzo-soprano	Linda Fiorio
Sallustio	bass	Giuseppe Bernasconi

Most of these singers were quite well known at the time, especially Carlo Negrini who was one of Italy's leading tenors and had created the role of Gabriele Adorno in Verdi's Simon Boccanegra a year earlier. Guicciardi was the first Conte di Luna in Il trovatore.

== Synopsis ==
Both Glauco, a noble Roman, and Arbace, the high priest of Isis, love Jone. She is the latter's ward, and regards him as a second father. A slave girl, Nidia, also loves Glauco. Burbo, Arbace's henchman, gives Nidia some poison, asking her to give it to Glauco to drink. He assures her that it is an elixir of love. Glauco drinks only enough to become delirious.

This gives Arbace a chance to convince Jone that Glauco is worthless. He persuades her to come to the temple of Isis where he makes unwelcome advances. In the meantime, Glauco has been restored to reason. He rushes in to save her, but is seized, accused of sacrilege and condemned to death. Arbace offers to save Glauco's life in return for Jone's favors, which she refuses.

With the crowd assembled in the circus, Nidia reveals Arbace's infamy to the praetor. Glauco is freed. Vesuvius erupts and Arbace dies in the eruption. Jone and Glauco find each other in the crowd, and ask Nidia to flee with them. But she returns to the city to die, while the lovers escape.
