= Salvino Salvini =

Italian sculptor (1824–1899)

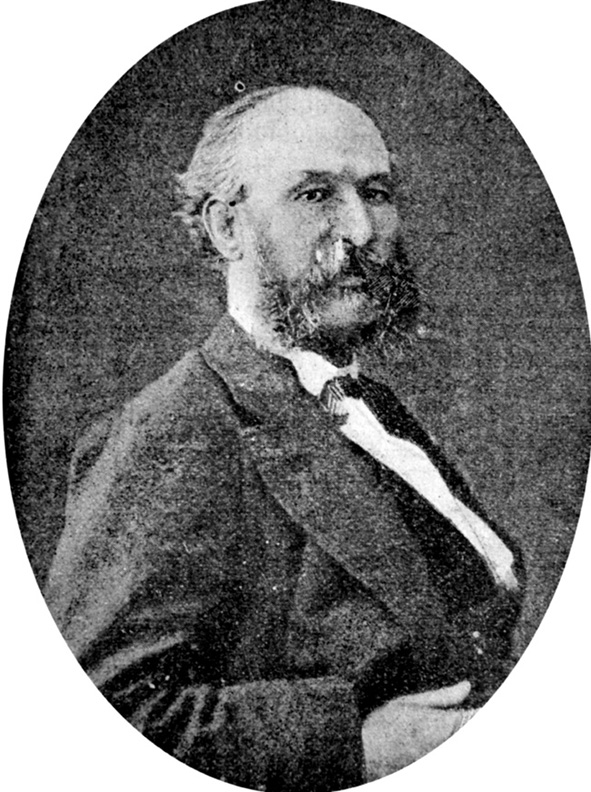
Salvino Salvini (date unknown)

Salvino Salvini (26 March 1824, Livorno - 4 June 1899, Arezzo) was an Italian sculptor best known for his grave monuments.

== Biography ==
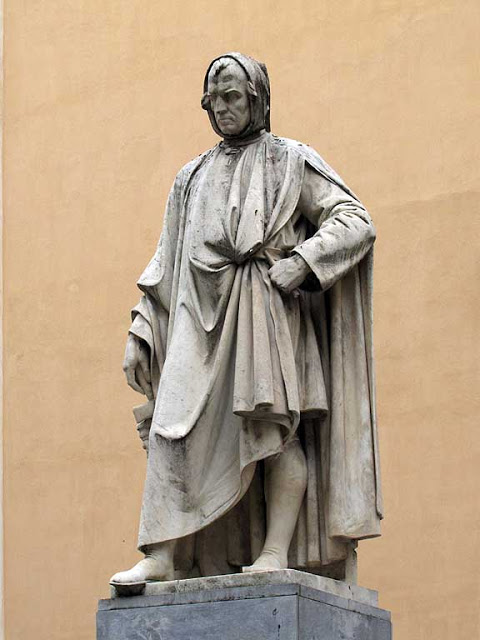
Monument to the sculptor, Nicola Pisano

He was born to a family of modest origin. His father wanted him to receive a classical education but, at the age of twelve, he was inspired to pursue a career in art when he saw a statue by Paolo Emilio Demi. Two years later, he was able to attend free drawing classes offered by a local artist and created his first clay busts.

In 1840, he was admitted to the Accademia di Belle Arti di Firenze, where he initially studied with Giovanni Dupré. He eventually found his mentor in Lorenzo Bartolini. Although they often clashed, in 1849 he was able to go to Rome to study with Pietro Tenerani, largely on the basis of Bartolini's recommendation. In 1852, Tenerani used his influence with Grand Duke Leopold II to obtain an appointment for Salvini as Professor of Ornamentation at the Accademia di Belle Arti in Pisa.

During his time there, he was also appointed to the position of Export Inspector for the Grand Duchy of Tuscany. In this capacity, he was called upon to validate the authenticity of several major artworks, including a bust of Calliope by Antonio Canova. In 1855, he married Cesira Montemerli, a noblewoman, and they had two children.

Six years later, he was named to succeed Cincinnato Baruzzi at the Accademia di Belle Arti di Bologna His first major work there was a statue of Saint John the Evangelist for the façade of the Basilica di Santa Croce (1862). That same year, he became a Professor. In 1867, he was awarded the Cross of the Order of Saints Maurice and Lazarus. In 1874, he became a member of the Società Benvenuto Tisi da Garofalo, a cultural organization in Ferrara. There, he sat as a judge of the works of young sculptors seeking admission to the "School of Drawing for Arts and Crafts".

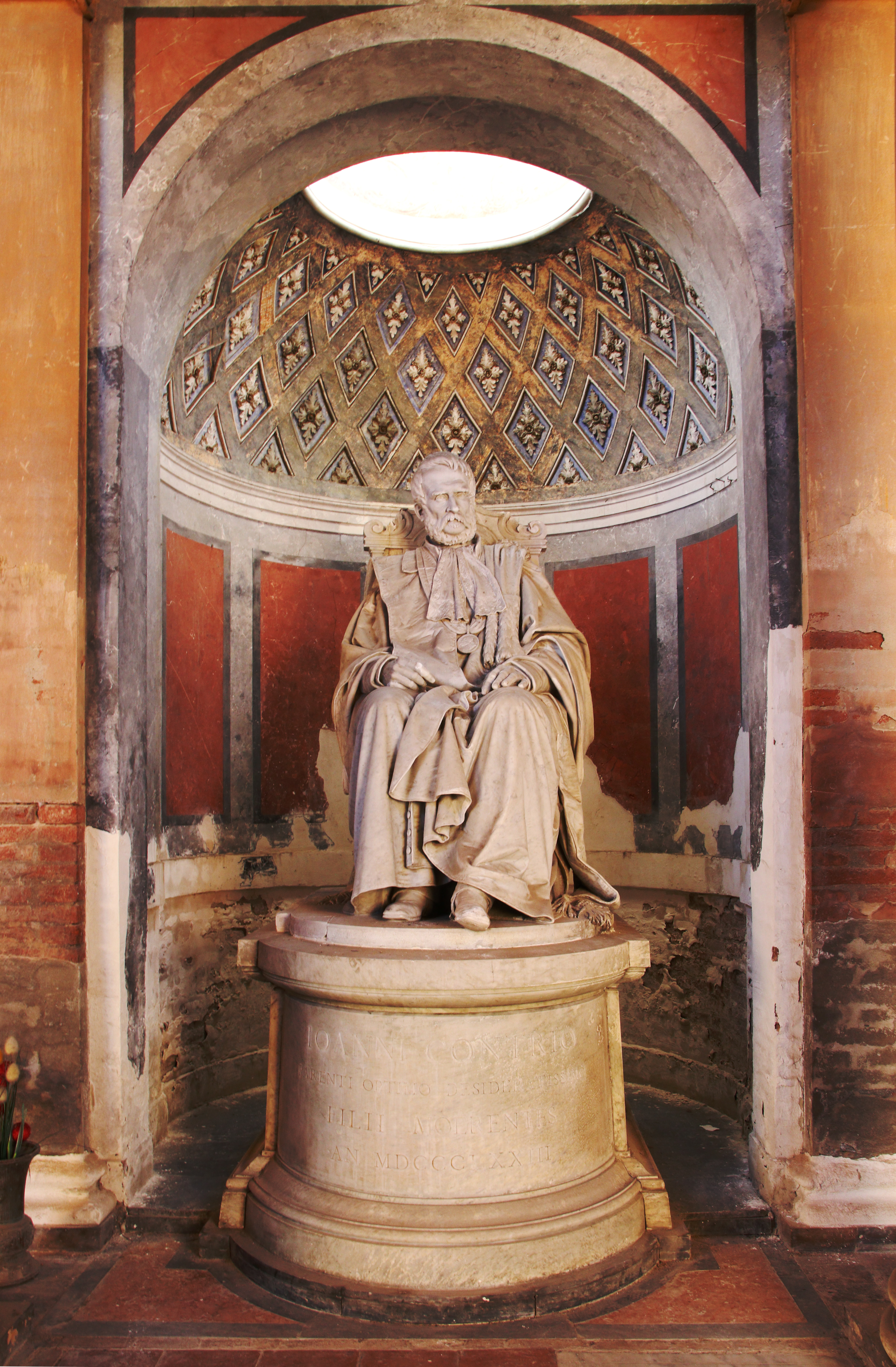
Monument to the botanist, Giovanni Contri (1788-1860)

Also worthy of mention is a statue of the thirteenth-century Cardinal, Pietro Valeriano, for the façade of the Cattedrale di Santa Maria del Fiore (1876). His notable students included Giovan Battista Longanesi-Cattani, Diego Sarti, Tullo Golfarelli, Enrico Barberi and Pasquale Rizzoli.

In 1890, he began to suffer from a progressive paralysis and was forced to stop teaching. He was retired by royal decree in 1893 and moved to Arezzo. In 1895, he was named a Commander in the Order of the Crown of Italy. The city of Livorno named a street after him in 1938.
