= Marco Visconti (TV series) =

- Genre: Historical adventure
- Based on: Marco Visconti by Tommaso Grossi
- Written by: Anton Giulio Majano; Franco Monicelli
- Directed by: Anton Giulio Majano
- Starring: Raf Vallone; Pamela Villoresi
- Country of origin: Italy
- Original language: Italian
- No. of series: 1
- No. of episodes: 6

Production
- Production company: RAI Radiotelevisione Italiana

Original release
- Network: RAI
- Release: 4 May – 8 June 1975

Marco Visconti is an Italian television series which originally aired in one series of six episodes in 1975. A historical adventure, it is based on the 1834 novel of the same title by Tommaso Grossi which had previously been made into 1925 and 1941 films.

== Main cast ==
- Raf Vallone as Marco Visconti
- Pamela Villoresi as Bice
- Sandro Tuminelli as Oldrado
- Gianni Garko as Lupo
- Warner Bentivegna as Lodrisio Visconti
- Liliana Feldman as Marianna
- Gabriele Lavia as Ottorino Visconti
- Maresa Gallo as Lauretta
- Franca Nuti as Ermelinda
- Francesco Di Federico as Ambrogio
- Carlo Montagna as Pelagrua
- Herbert Pagani as Tremacoldo
- Leonardo Severini as Il Pievano
- Armando Celso as Gentiluomo
- Enzo Fisichella as Il maggiordomo
- Evaldo Rogato as Popolano
- Gianni Quillico as Un servo
- Franco Ferrari as Gentiluomo
- Franco Moraldi as Gentiluomo
- Bruno Vilar as Gentiluomo
- Ottavio Fanfani as Il vescovo di Lucca
- Roberto Pistone as Gentiluomo
- Mario Mattia Giorgetti as Primo gentiluomo lucchese
- Aldo Suligoj as Gentiluomo
- Sergio Masieri as Secondo gentiluomo lucchese
- Carlo Sabatini as Azzone Visconti
- Itala Martini as Dama
- Licia Lombardi as Dama
- Umberto Tabarelli as L'abate Giovanni Visconti
- Aldo Pierantoni as Il Decano del popolo
- Marcello Mandò as Vinciguerra
- Sergio Renda as Birago

== Bibliography ==
- Moliterno, Gino. The A to Z of Italian Cinema. Scarecrow Press, 2009.
