= Tullo Golfarelli =

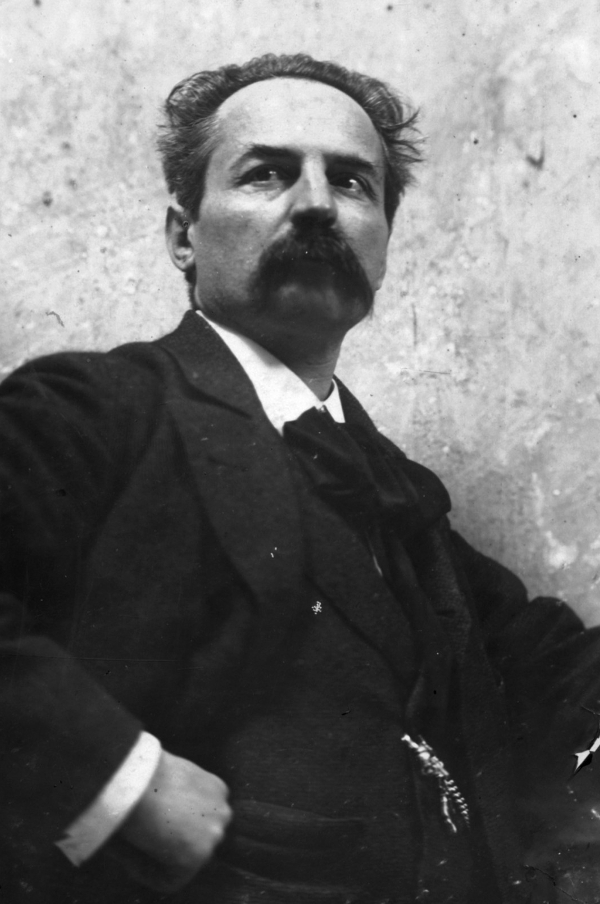
Tullo Golfarelli (date unknown)

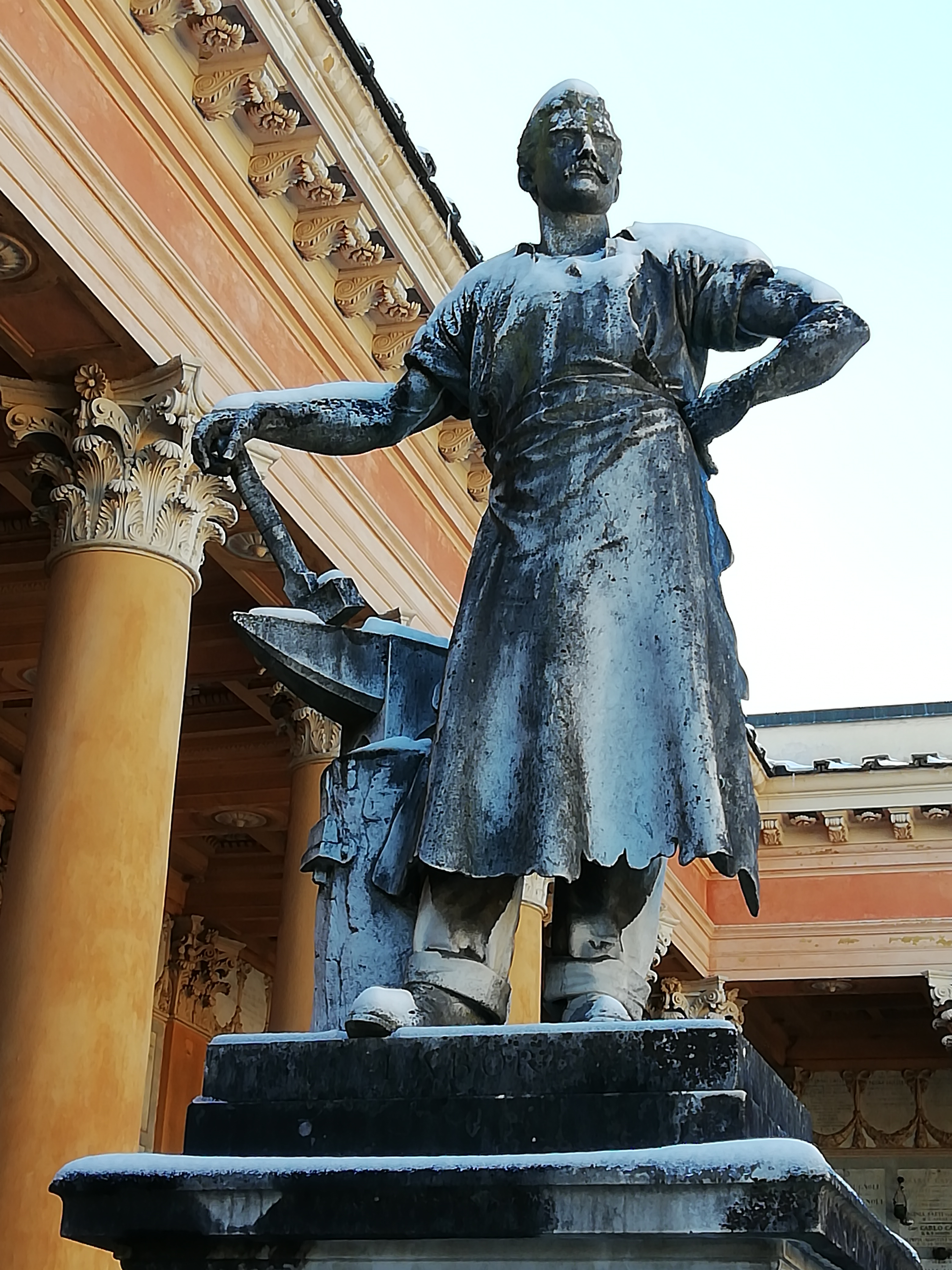
"Labor", a monument to Gaetano Simoli, Bologna's municipal locksmith, at the Certosa di Bologna

Tullo Golfarelli (24 June 1852, Bologna - 30 March 1928, Bologna) was an Italian sculptor and painter.

== Biography ==
He was born to Enrico Golfarelli, a goldsmith, and his wife Vittoria, née Bassoli. His father introduced him to the techniques of engraving and metalworking, and he attended technical schools from 1864 to 1867.

In 1875, thanks to a subsidy from the municipality of Cesena, he was able to move to Rome, where he worked in the studios of a sculptor named Gagliardi. In 1880, he moved to Naples to have some additional training with Domenico Morelli and Filippo Palizzi. The following year he applied for admission to the Academy of Fine Arts, but was unsuccessful.

In addition to his formal studies, his friendship with Vincenzo Gemito encouraged his inclinations toward Realism. Frequent travels enabled him to acquire commissions throughout Italy. By the end of the 1880s, he had become part of the Bolognese cultural circle, where he formed life-long relationships with Giosuè Carducci and Giovanni Pascoli. Always striving to improve his technique, he worked with Salvino Salvini at the Academy of Fine Arts of Bologna.

During the 1880s and 1890s, he competed in numerous competitions for sculptures and monuments. Notable ones include Giuseppe Garibaldi, to be placed in Perugia (1885), and Christopher Columbus, destined for New York City (1890). Both commissions went to other competitors. His largest project involved ten monuments at the Certosa di Bologna, which were created during the 1890s and 1900s.

From 1887 to 1893, he was a teacher at the "Professional School of Decorative Arts" and was named an honorary member of the academy. In 1902, he married Zaira Petrini (1868-1948), with whom he would have two sons. The following year, he became a Knight of the Republic of San Marino. In 1912, he was appointed a professor at the academy; a position he held until 1921. By January 1923, his failing health had forced him to give up all of his academic positions, leaving him with severe economic problems. He spent his final years in isolation.
