= Luigi Serra =

Italian painter (1846–1888)

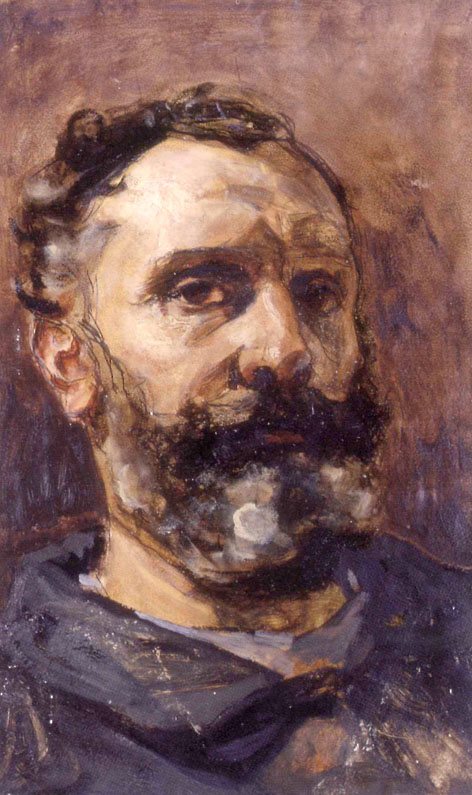
- Luigi Serra, self portrait 1887
- Born: June 8, 1846; Bologna, Italy
- Died: July 11, 1888 (aged 42); Bologna, Italy
- Known for: Painting

Luigi Serra (June 8, 1846 – July 11, 1888) was an Italian painter, known for his watercolors.

== Biography ==
In 1858 Serra began studies at the Collegio Artistico Venturoli, working first under Gaetano Serrazanetti and then under Luigi Busi. In 1863 he was admitted the Bolognese Academy of Fine Arts, where he studied under Giulio Cesare Ferrari, Antonio Puccinelli, and Salvino Salvini, and in 1865 he received a medal for painting. In 1866, he won the Angiolini Stipend, a prize that allowed him to travel to Florence.

In Florence, he was a companion of Raffaele Faccioli, with whom he shared an award in 1866. The last years of his scholarship (1869-1870) led him to move to Rome. In Florence, he had befriended the circle of Macchiaioli painters who frequented the Caffè Michelangiolo; yet, unlike those painters, Serra practiced in a Purismo style recalling Quattrocento painters like Francesco del Cossa, Andrea del Castagno, Verrocchio, and Pollaiolo. In the early 1870s Serra joined a city council for education led by Giosue Carducci and Raffaele Belluzzi. Serra along with the lawyer Ulisse Sartori, represented the Societies of Artists and Fine Arts.

In 1870 at Parma, he exhibited: Annibale Bentivoglio, prisoner in the Castle of Varano. In 1877 Serra moved to Rome, the following year he began studies for the large painting Entry of the Catholic Army into Prague (event occurring after the Battle of White Mountain) for the apse of the church of Santa Maria della Vittoria. That church was founded in celebration of that event. In 1883, he exhibited that painting in Rome. Among his watercolors: Mezzogiorno; Dal Colosseo (1884, exhibited at Mostra of Fine Arts in Turin); and the sketch San Carlo ai Catinari.

In 1873, accompanied by Mario De Maria, Paolo Bedini, and Raffaele Faccioli, Serra travelled to the International Exposition of Vienna. In 1874 he travels to Turin, and meets Marco Calderini, and the next year wins another three-year stipend. In 1875, after three years, Serra finished his Allegory of the Arts for the sipario (theater curtain) for Theater of Fabriano. In 1880, he returned to finish further painting of allegorical figures for the ceiling of the Theater Gentile in Fabriano.

Back in Rome, displayed some sketches in the competition for the decoration of the so-called "Yellow Hall" of the Senate. Despite the considerable efforts made by Serra, studying Roman history and making preparatory sketches, he lost the commission to Cesare Maccari. In 1882 his Apparition of the Virgin to Saints Francis and Bonaventure, commissioned by the Padri Reformati of the Church of the Crucifix located on via del Cestello, Bologna. Between 1882 and 1883 Serra was collaborator under the pseudonym L'imbianchino to the magazine Cronaca Bizantina published by Angelo Sommaruga. Serra continued to publish articles and correspondences for periodicals until 1877.

In 1881, Serra was appointed academic correspondent of the Royal Academy of Fine Arts in Bologna. In 1888, he also exhibited in Bologna paintings depicting antique sites demolished in Rome with urban renewal.

In 1884, his portrait of Signora Deserti, despite four months of effort, was declined. He also lost a commission for painting the Stations of the Cross for the church of San Gioacchino in Turin. In 1884 he submitted two watercolors at the Turin Exposition. By 1885, he had moved to Rome, painted the canvas I Coronari, sold through the Florentine Gallery of Luigi Pisani. In 1886, he painted a large tempera canvas depicting Irnerius glosses (elucidates) the Justinian Code for the ceiling of the council chamber of the Province of Bologna located in the Palazzo d'Accursio. In 1888 he completes the portrait of Mrs. Enrica Whiting and studies for a painting St John of Nepomuk, commissioned by Prince Torlonia for the family chapel in San Giovanni Laterano.
