= Marco Visconti (1925 film) =

1925 film

- Directed by: Aldo De Benedetti
- Based on: Marco Visconti by Tommaso Grossi
- Starring: Bruto Castellani; Amleto Novelli
- Cinematography: Carlo Montuori; Emilio Peruzzi
- Production company: Montalbano Film
- Distributed by: Montalbano Film
- Release date: March 1925
- Country: Italy
- Languages: Silent; Italian intertitles

Marco Visconti is a 1925 Italian silent historical drama film directed by Aldo De Benedetti. It was based on the 1834 novel of the same name by Tommaso Grossi, which was later adapted into a 1941 sound film.

== Cast ==
- Ruggero Barni
- Toto Lo Bue
- Bruto Castellani
- Adolfo Geri
- Amleto Novelli
- Gino Soldarelli
- Cecyl Tryan
- Perla Yves

== Bibliography ==
- Goble, Alan. The Complete Index to Literary Sources in Film. Walter de Gruyter, 1999.
