= Marco Visconti (1941 film) =

- French film poster
- Directed by: Mario Bonnard
- Written by: Cesare Ludovici; Mario Bonnard; Oreste Gasperini; Vittorio Nino Novarese
- Based on: Marco Visconti by Tommaso Grossi
- Starring: Carlo Ninchi; Roberto Villa; Mariella Lotti
- Cinematography: Mario Albertelli
- Edited by: Renzo Lucidi
- Music by: Giulio Bonnard
- Production company: Consorzio Italiano Film
- Distributed by: ENIC
- Release date: 19 March 1941
- Running time: 108 minutes
- Country: Italy
- Language: Italian

Marco Visconti is a 1941 Italian historical drama film directed by Mario Bonnard and starring Carlo Ninchi, Roberto Villa and Mariella Lotti. It is based on the novel of the same name by Tommaso Grossi which had previously been made into a 1925 silent film.

It was shot at the Cinecittà Studios in Rome. The film's sets were designed by the art directors Piero Filippone and Vittorio Nino Novarese.

== Main cast ==
- Carlo Ninchi as Marco Visconti
- Roberto Villa as Ottorino Visconti
- Mariella Lotti as Bice Del Balzo
- Alberto Capozzi as Lodrisio Visconti
- Guglielmo Barnabò as Oldrado Del Balzo
- Ernesto Almirante as Tremacoldo
- Alfredo De Antoni as Il conte Rusconi
- Mario Gallina as Pelagrua
- Augusto Di Giovanni as Lupo
- Nini Dinelli as Lauretta

== Bibliography ==
- Goble, Alan. The Complete Index to Literary Sources in Film. Walter de Gruyter, 1999.
