= Marco Visconti (novel) =

1834 Tommaso Grossi novel

- A 1938 edition of the novel
- Author: Tommaso Grossi
- Language: Italian
- Genre: Historical
- Publication date: 1834
- Publication place: Italy
- Media type: Print

Marco Visconti is an 1834 historical adventure novel by the Italian writer Tommaso Grossi. It is set in the Duchy of Milan in the fourteenth century. Part of the patriotic cultural revival that led to the Risorgimento, Grossi dedicated the work to the Italian Nationalist Giuseppe Mazzini.

== Adaptations ==
In 1925 it was turned into a silent film Marco Visconti directed by Aldo De Benedetti and in 1941 a sound film Marco Visconti by Mario Bonnard with Carlo Ninchi in the title role. In 1975 Raf Vallone played Visconti in a RAI television series Marco Visconti.

Composer Errico Petrella wrote an 1854 opera based on the novel.

== Bibliography ==
- Morrison, Lucy; Feldman, Paula R.; Stone, Staci L. (2003). A Mary Shelley Encyclopedia. Greenwood Publishing Group.
- Goble, Alan (1999). The Complete Index to Literary Sources in Film. Walter de Gruyter.
