= Carlo Sabatini (actor) =

Italian actor and voice actor (1932–2020)

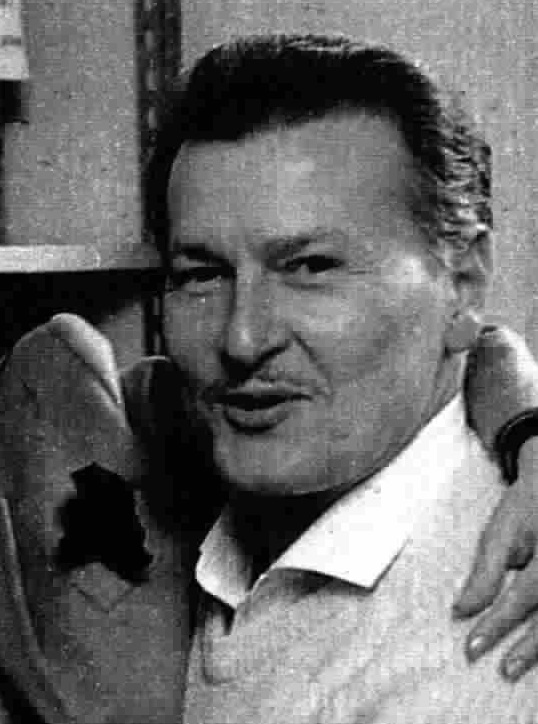
- Sabatini in 1990
- Born: 7 April 1932; Rome, Italy
- Died: 10 April 2020 (aged 88); Rome, Italy
- Occupations: Actor; voice actor
- Years active: 1954–2020
- Children: Gabriele Sabatini

Carlo Sabatini (7 April 1932 – 10 April 2020) was an Italian actor and voice actor.

== Early life and career ==
Born in Rome on 7 April 1932, he began his career in theatre, film, and television in the 1950s. He got his first film role in the historical melodrama Senso, directed by Luchino Visconti, who also hired him to dub Alain Delon's Italian voice as Tancredi Falconeri in The Leopard and with whom he also worked on stage. Through the years, Sabatini acted in multiple films and TV shows directed by Anton Giulio Majano, Vittorio Sindoni and Leandro Castellani. He was also cast in a few international productions, most notably John Moore's 2006 film The Omen (a remake of Richard Donner's film of the same name) where Sabatini portrayed Cardinal Fabretti.

As a voice actor, Sabatini mainly dubbed voices for Italian-dubbed editions of foreign films. In Sabatini’s character dubbing roles, he famously dubbed over the voice of Magneto (portrayed by Ian McKellen) in the X-Men film franchise as well as Morgan Freeman’s role as "Red" in the 1994 film The Shawshank Redemption, while on television he dubbed Josiah Bartlet (portrayed by Martin Sheen) in The West Wing and Philip Banks (portrayed by James Avery) in The Fresh Prince of Bel-Air. The many actors he dubbed included Clint Eastwood, Donald Sutherland, Harvey Keitel, Bruce Lee, and Kris Kristofferson; he also voiced Chilkoot in the Italian dub of the animated Disney film Brother Bear 2.

=== Personal life and death ===
Sabatini was the father of voice actor Gabriele Sabatini.

Sabatini died in Rome on 10 April 2020, three days after his 88th birthday.

== Selected filmography ==
=== Film ===
- Senso (1954) - A soldier
- The Rebel Gladiators (1963) - Settimio (as Carlo Delmi)
- Boccaccio '70 (1970) - Cameo
- Sacco & Vanzetti (1971) - McCallum
- Strangled Lives (1996) - Commissioner
- The Omen (2006) - Cardinal Fabretti

=== Television ===
- I fuochi di San Giovanni - TV play (1966) - Georg
- I promessi sposi - TV miniseries (1967)
- La pietà di novembre - TV play (1968) - Riccardo, Luca's brother
- Il corsaro - TV play (1971) - Captain, Jones
- Marco Visconti - TV series (1975) - Azzone Visconti
- Un delitto perbene - TV miniseries (1977)
- La gatta (1978) - André
- Il sottoscritto Giuseppe Donati all'alta corte di giustizia - TV film (1983)
- Una fredda mattina di maggio - TV film (1990)
- Una donna per amico - TV series, 1 episode (1998) - Camilla's father
- Soraya - TV miniseries (2003)
- Pope John Paul II - TV miniseries (2005) - Master of Ceremonies

== Dubbing roles ==
=== Animation ===
- Chilkoot in Brother Bear 2
- Recruiting Officer in Valiant
- Bob Shumway in ALF: The Animated Series

=== Live action ===
- Erik Lehnsherr / Magneto in X-Men, X2, X-Men: The Last Stand. The Wolverine, X-Men: Days of Future Past
- Will Gates in Restoration
- Ellis Boyd "Red" Redding in The Shawshank Redemption
- Lee in Enter the Dragon
- Jacob Fuller in From Dusk till Dawn
- Senator Roark in Sin City, Sin City: A Dame to Kill For
- David in Alice Doesn't Live Here Anymore
- John Burnett in Dance with Me
- Ken Murphy in He's Just Not That Into You
- Josiah Bartlet in The West Wing
- Philip Banks in The Fresh Prince of Bel-Air
- Willard Kraft in Sabrina the Teenage Witch
- Robert Koesler in The Rosary Murders
- Douglas Thomas in The Art of War
- Ed Gentry in Deliverance
- Principal Dimly in Bratz
- Francis Tierney Sr. in Pride and Glory
- Earl Macklin in The Outfit
- Roger Prynne in The Scarlet Letter
- Dixon Doss in The Gingerbread Man
- Captain Koons in Pulp Fiction
- Hickey in Last Man Standing
- Thomas Highway in Heartbreak Ridge
- Tommy Nowak in Pink Cadillac
- Jim Court in Say Anything...
- Al in The Hudsucker Proxy
- Poppy Burns in Dan in Real Life
- Sven Sorenson in Free Money
- Harry Ross in Twilight
- Lord Percival Graves in King Ralph
- James Graham in Rob Roy
- Matt Johnson in Big Wednesday
- Bubba Wilkes in The Undefeated
- Prince Tancredi Falconeri in The Leopard (Italian: Il Gattopardo)
- Dr. Chasuble in The Importance of Being Earnest
- Bollingsworth in Chain of Fools
- Dan August in Dan August
- Norman Dale in Hoosiers
- Reginald in Mr. Popper's Penguins
- Donald Shellhammer in Miracle on 34th Street
- Polonius in Hamlet
