= Gaetano Braga =

Italian composer (1829–1907)

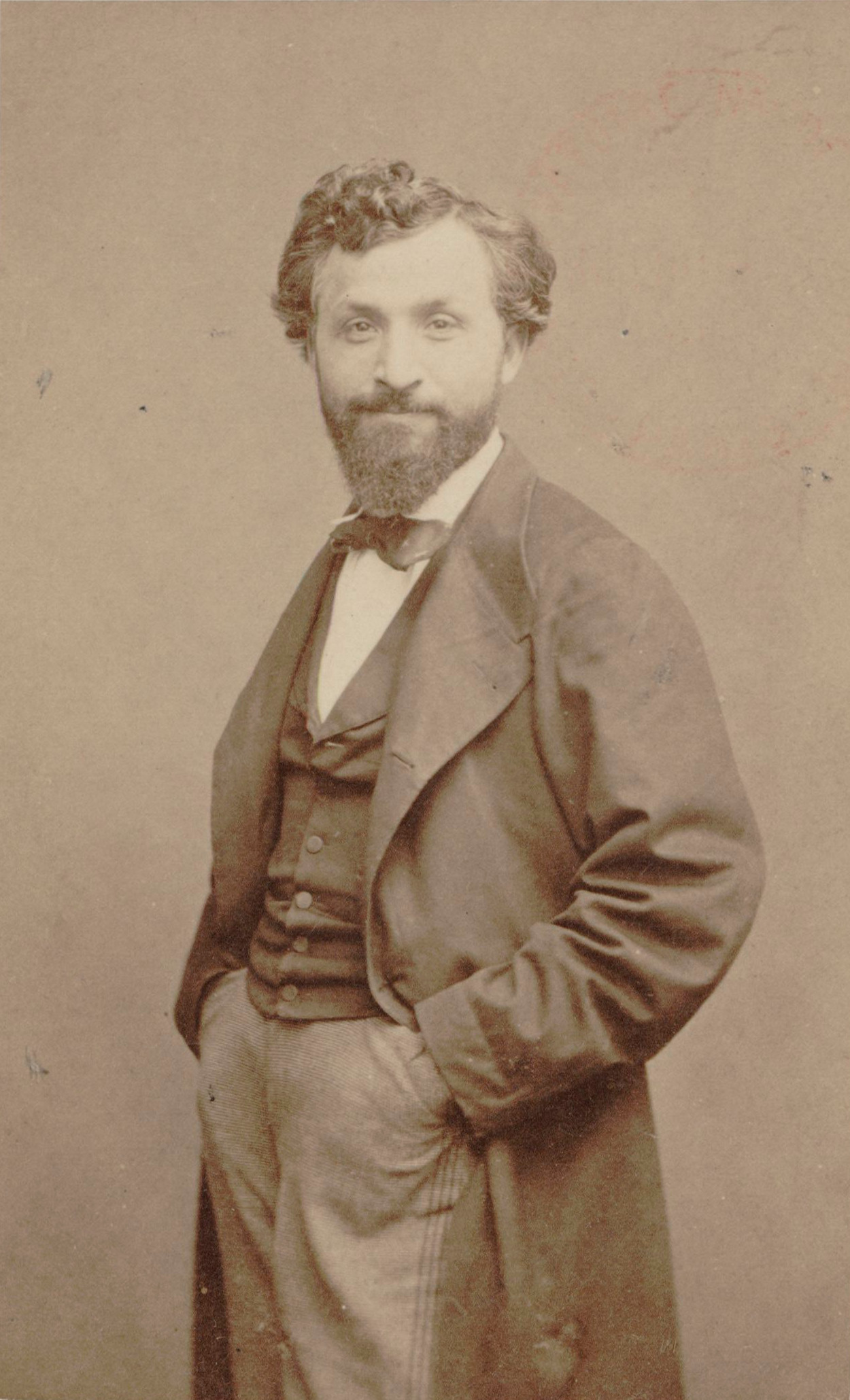
Gaetano Braga. Photograph by Étienne Carjat.

Gaetano Braga (June 9, 1829 – November 21, 1907) was an Italian composer and cellist.

He was born in Giulianova in Abruzzi and died in Milan.

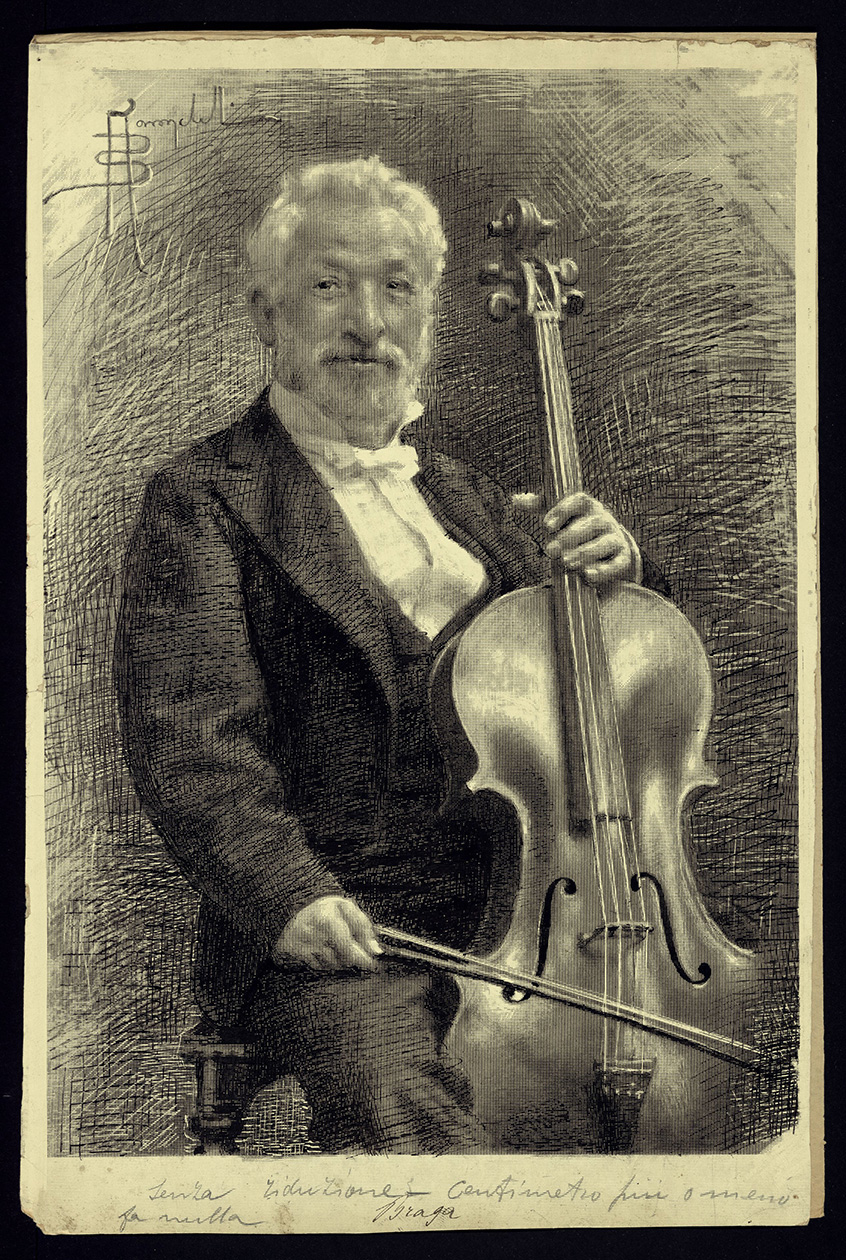
Portrait of Gaetano Braga by Andrea Baronchelli

Braga's works include compositions for the cello (two concertos, a quintet, a quartet, works for cello and piano) and the operas:

- Alina or La spregiata (1853, Naples)
- Estella di San Germano (1857, Vienna)
- Il ritratto (1858, Naples)
- Margherita la mendicante (1859, Paris)
- Mormile (1862, Milan)
- Ruy Blas (1868)
- Reginella (1871, Lecco)
- Caligola (1873, Lisbon)

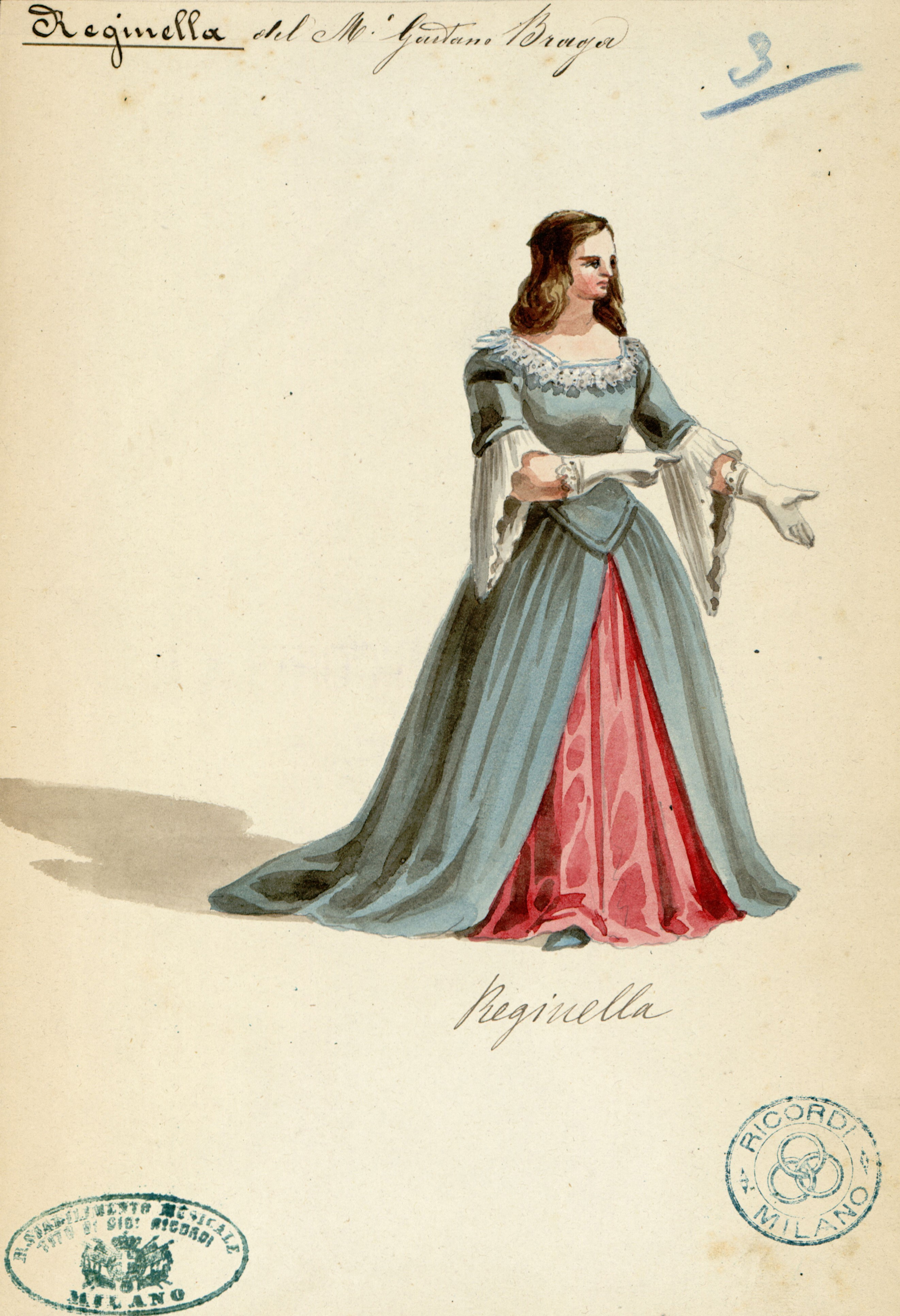
Reginella, costume design for Reginella (1871).

A "Serenata" (serenade) by Braga, sometimes called "Angel's Serenade" or "Légende valaque" (Wallachian Legend), is a dialogue (comparable to that in "Erlkönig") between a worried mother and a girl who hears an angel's voice calling her; in the end the girl follows the voice ("O mamma buona notte, io seguo il suon, io seguo il suon!"). The main melody, as sung by a choir, is also the theme from the CBS television show, Amos 'n' Andy. It is mentioned in Anton Chekhov's short story "The Black Monk," as well as in other Russian works of the late 19th and early 20th centuries. As composed, the narrator sings the voice of the mother and girl, while the angel's voice is portrayed through the violin or cello. In the original print, the string player was instructed to play from an adjoining room from the pianist and singer, in order to create the effect of a distant angelic voice. Braga's "Angel's Serenade" has been recorded notably by tenor John McCormack and violinist Fritz Kreisler (in English), Jan Peerce and Mischa Elman (in English), Christian Ketter and Cara Schlecker (in Italian), Richard Tauber and Dajos Bela (in German).

== Sources ==
- Renato Badalì, Dizionario della musica italiana. La musica strumentale, Roma, Tascabili Economici Newton, 1996, ISBN 88-8183-509-6.
