= Erminia Borghi-Mamo =

Italian opera singer

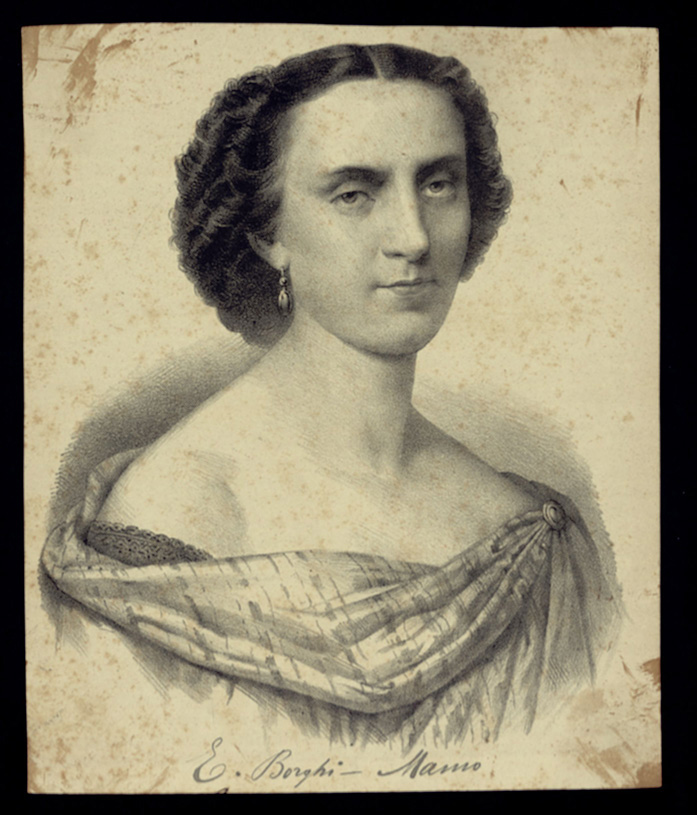
Portrait of Erminia Borghi Mamo

Erminia Borghi-Mamo (November 18, 1855 – July 29, 1941) was an Italian opera singer.

== Early life ==
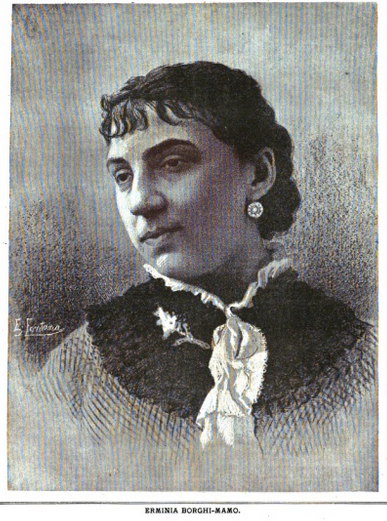
Erminia Borghi-Mamo, from an 1883 publication.

Erminia Borghi-Mamo was born in Paris, the daughter of Michele Mamo and Adelaide Borghi-Mamo, both Italian opera singers. She was literally born into the theatre: Adelaide Borghi-Mamo finished a performance of Verdi's Il Trovatore, then gave birth to Erminia hours later, in a room within the theatre La Comédie Italienne. She was named for soprano Erminia Frezzolini, a friend of Adelaide's. She studied voice with her mother and with Alessandro Busi. Fellow soprano Ayres Borghi-Zerni was her cousin.

== Career ==
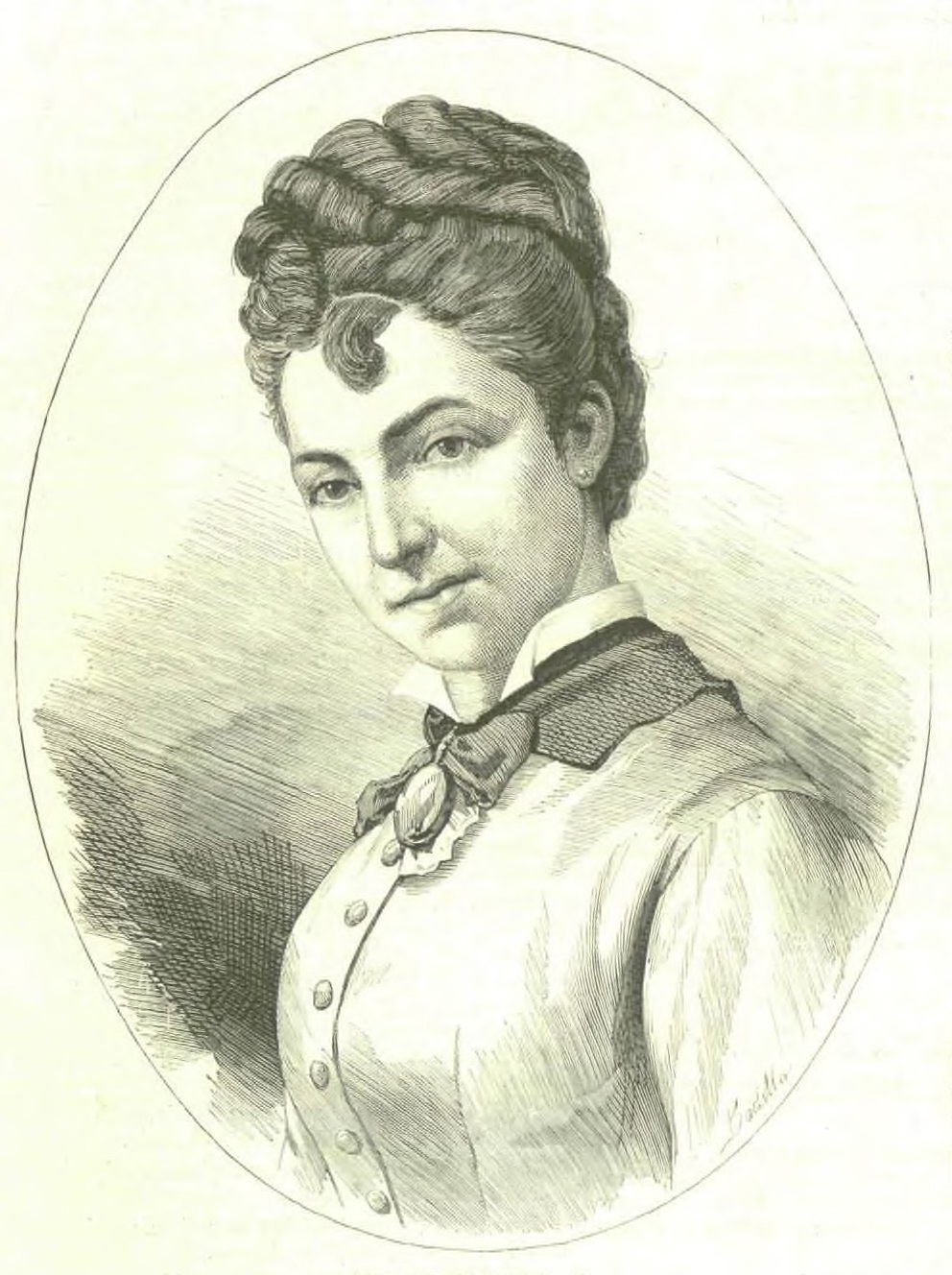
A picture from La Ilustración Española y Americana (1878)

Erminia Borghi-Mamo made her opera stage debut in 1873, in Nice, in La forza del destino. She was active in Italian opera for the next twenty years. "Still quite young, Mdlle. Borghi-Mamo is already mistress of the vocal art," an English writer reported in 1876, adding that "intelligence and soul are her characteristic qualities; she is all sympathy. The opening of her artistic career promises the most splendid future, for her voice is capable of the most delicate expression, and the most varied effects." Her best-known roles included the title parts in Aida and Lucrezia Borgia, Santuzza in Cavalleria Rusticana, Margherita and Elena in Mefistofele, and Leonora in Il trovatore. Her last performance was in 1893.

== Personal life ==
Erminia Borghi-Mamo married. She died in 1941, in Bologna, aged 85 years. Her grave is in the Certosa di Bologna.
