= Salvatore Pappalardo (composer) =

Italian composer and conductor

Salvatore Pappalardo (1817–1884) was an Italian composer and conductor.

Born in Catania, Pappalardo began his studies in his home city before entering the Palermo Conservatory where he studied under Pietro Raimondi. He worked as a music teacher and was a conductor at the opera house in Catania until he moved to Naples in 1845 when he was made the court composer for Prince Leopold, Count of Syracuse. He later worked as a teacher of music theory and composition in Naples, where he died in 1884.

Libretto for Mirinda

Pappalardo's work as a composer was mainly directed towards composing operas and other music for the theatre. He composed eight operas: Francesca da Rimini (1844), Il corsaro (Naples, 1846), La figlia del Doge (Catania, 1855), L'atrabiliare (Naples, 1856), Mirinda (Naples, 1860), Gustavo Wasa (Naples, 1865), Le diavolesse (Naples, 1878), and Le due ambasciatrici (never performed). He also composed a significant amount of church music. His most successful and innovative music however, was his chamber music; particularly his collection of art songs for voice and piano and a collection of string quartets and quintets. His chamber music was played throughout Italy and Germany.
