= Cincinnato Baruzzi =

Italian sculptor

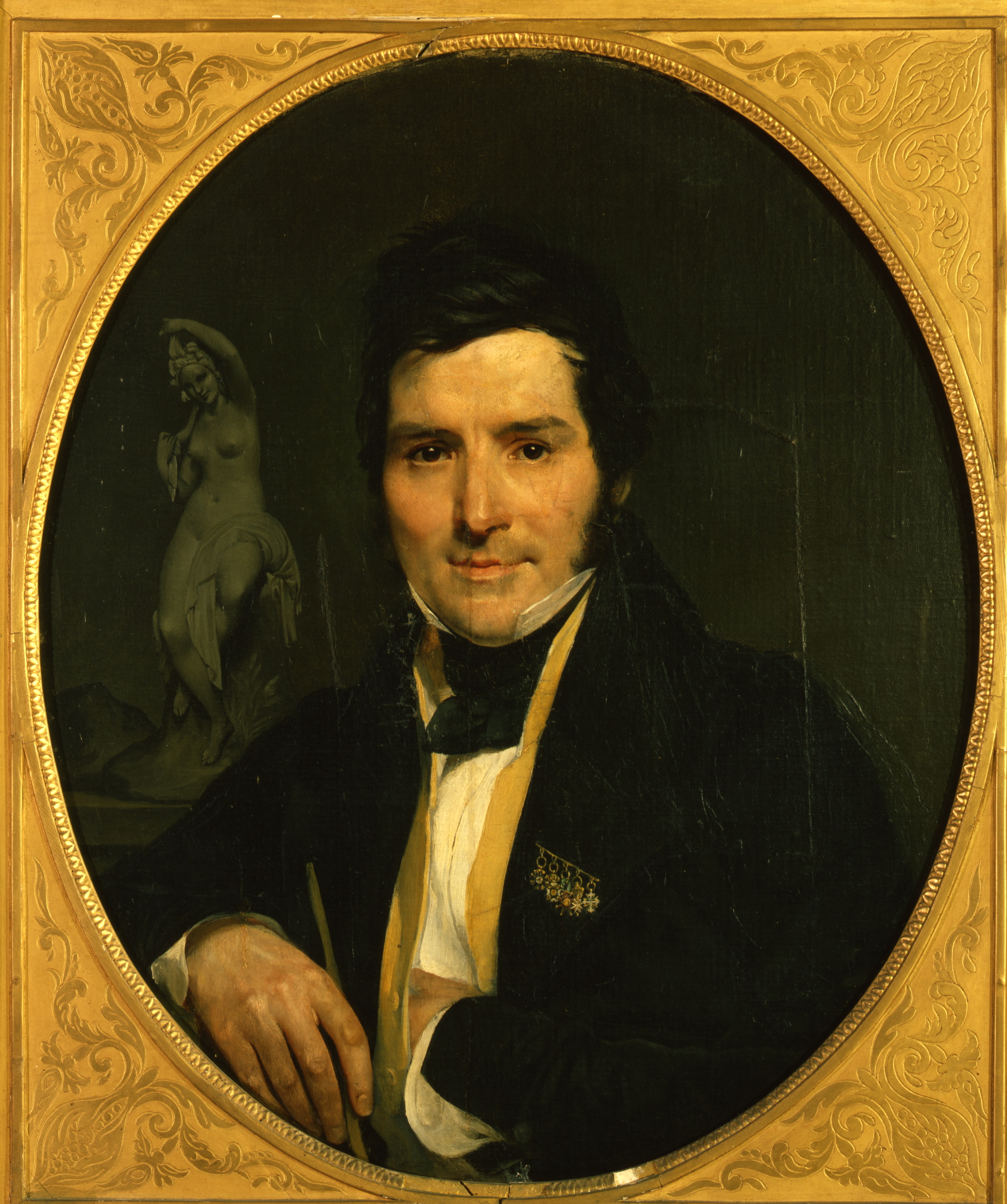
- Born: 16 March 1796; Imola, Emilia Romagna
- Died: 28 January 1878 (aged 81) in Bologna, Emilia Romagna

Cincinnato Baruzzi (16 March 1796 – 28 January 1878) was an Italian sculptor and professor of the same subject at the Accademia di Belle Arti of Bologna from 1831 to 1859.

== Education ==
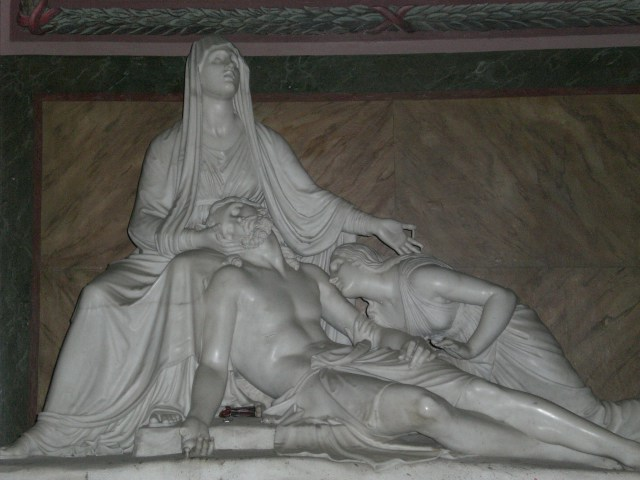
Modeled after Canova's design, this sculpture is found in the neoclassical S.S. Salvatore church in Terracina, Lazio.

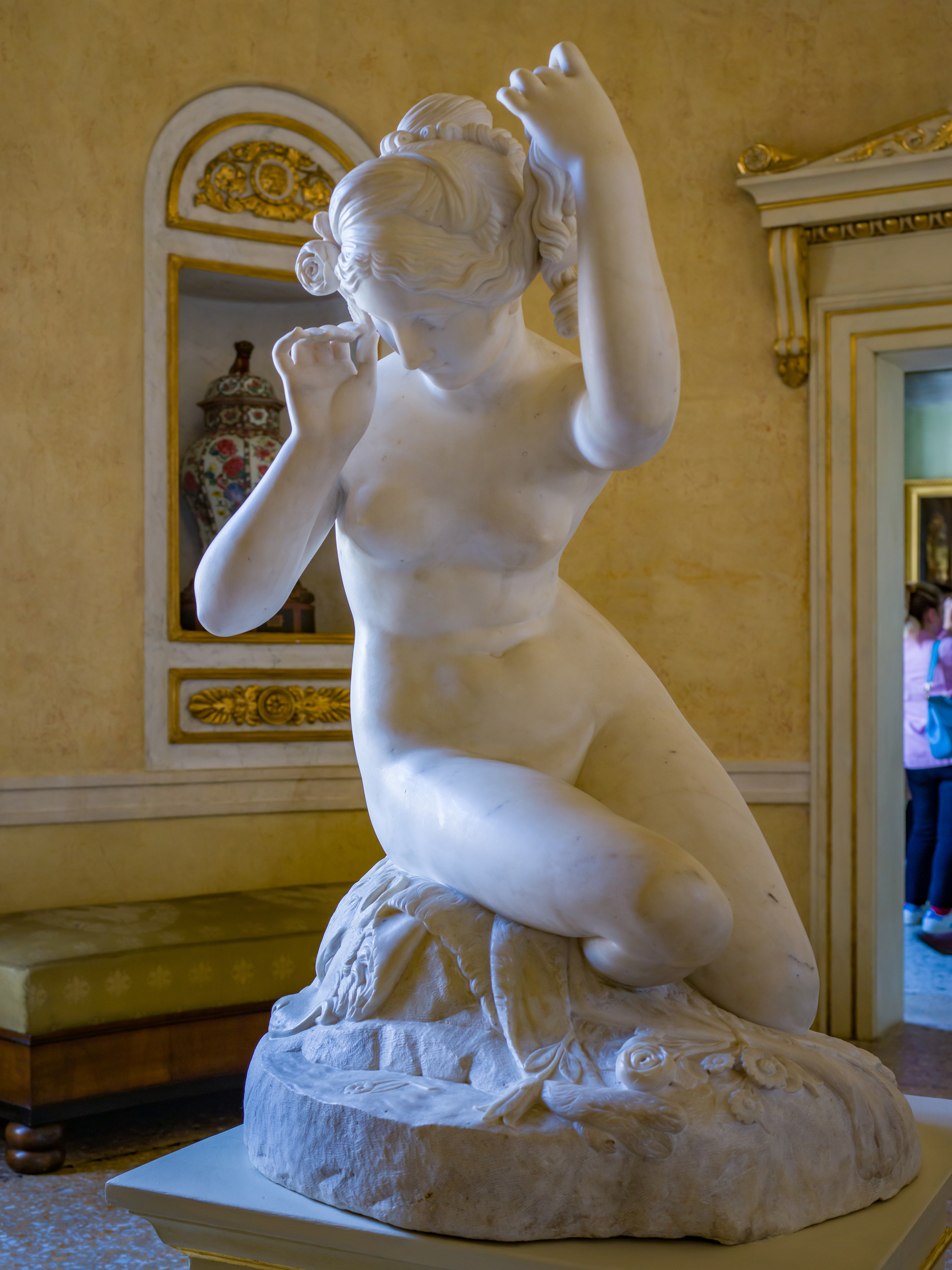
Sculpture of Silvia fixing her hair by Baruzzi in Brescia

Cincinnato Baruzzi was born in Imola. His parents were Vincenzo Luigi and Maria Tadolini, the daughter of the architect Francesco Tadolini. Baruzzi's first schooling was completed in Imola but in 1814 he enrolled into the Scuola di Ornato, di Anatomia e di Elementi di Figura at the Accademia di Belle Arti of Bologna, that was at that time run by Giacomo De Maria.

In 1819 he won the allunato prize, which provided him the opportunity to enroll in classes in Rome to perfect his skills in the workshop of Antonio Canova. With the death of his teacher (13 October 1822) he assumed the directorship by the bequest of the only heir, monsignor Gian Battista Sartori, and of the superintendent of the workshop, Sir Antonio d'Este.

== Bologna ==
In September 1831 Baruzzi was called to Bologna to take the professorship of sculpture at the Accademia of Belle Arti, that was empty after De Maria left it and the designated successor Adamo Tadolini refused. In Bologna, he lived in a villa on the hill of San Mamolo, called L’Eliso or Villa Baruzziana; he dedicated the rest of his life to the restructuring of it with the intent of constructing a kind of house-museum, where he could show case works produced and collected over the course of his life. The inauguration of the house took place in 1836, to celebrate his marriage with the painter Carolina Primodì, the daughter of Francesco Primodì. During the attack of Bologna by Austrian troops in 1849, L’Eliso was transformed into a barracks; in the ten days of occupation the house was ransacked and destroyed, and many works were damaged or lost. Since the economic aid promised by the government never arrived, Baruzzi personally went to Rome, Naples, and Paris to sell some of his works, but the earnings from them did not cover the cost of rebuilding the villa.

== End of career ==
Between 1857 and 1859 Baruzzi once again went to Rome, this time with his friend Pelagio Palagi, to present his project to finish the façade of San Petronio Basilica of Bologna. In 1859 he was victim of the purges started by Luigi Carlo Farini of people whom he thought to be sympathizers of the old regime, and Baruzzi was constrained to go into retirement.

== Legacy ==
A year later, his wife Carolina died leaving no heir; Baruzzi spent the rest of his life in his adored villa where he died 28 January 1878. His will, dated 5 April 1873, named his heir the Municipio di Bologna, with the commitment of investing his patrimony to the establishment of a prize for young artists within five years of his death.

The personal and work archive of Cincinnato Baruzzi can be found in the Biblioteca comunale dell'Archiginnasio of Bologna.

== Bibliography ==
- Catalogo di opere di scultura eseguite in marmo dal professore cavaliere Cincinnato Baruzzi a tutto l’anno 1859, [s.l., s.n.], 1860;
- Giuseppe Mazzini, Cincinnato Baruzzi: la vita, i tempi, le opere, Imola, Cooperativa Tipografica Editrice P. Galeati, 1949;
- Walter Galavotti, Cincinnato Baruzzi: vizi e virtù di uno scultore accademico dell’Ottocento, "Pagine di vita e storia imolesi", 2, 1984, pp. 95–111;
- Giuliano Gresleri, Attorno ad alcuni "pensieri" inediti di Pelagio Palagi e Cincinnato Baruzzi per la facciata e i restauri di S. Petronio, "Strenna Storica Bolognese", XLI, 1991, pp. 167–176;
- Cristina Fiorelli, Un contributo alla rivisitazione dell’attività artistica di Cincinnato Baruzzi (1796–1878), "Strenna Storica Bolognese", LII, 2002, pp. 223–246;
- Giuliano Gresleri, La stanza delle Grazie: Cincinnato Baruzzi come John Soane, in "Arti a confronto. Studi in onore di Anna Maria Matteucci", Bologna, Editrice Compositori, 2004, pp. 485–494;
- Uno scultore neoclassico a Bologna fra Restaurazione e Risorgimento. Il fondo Cincinnato Baruzzi nella Biblioteca dell’Archiginnasio, a cura di Clara Maldini, Bologna, Comune, 2006, 496 p. (Biblioteca de "L’Archiginnasio", serie III, vol. 5);
- Lino Sighinolfi, La vita e le opere di Cincinnato Baruzzi, in Uno scultore neoclassico a Bologna fra Restaurazione e Risorgimento. Il fondo Cincinnato Baruzzi nella Biblioteca dell’Archiginnasio, a cura di Clara Maldini, Bologna, Comune, 2006, pp. 299–354 (Biblioteca de "L’Archiginnasio", serie III, vol. 5).
