= Errico Petrella =

Italian opera composer

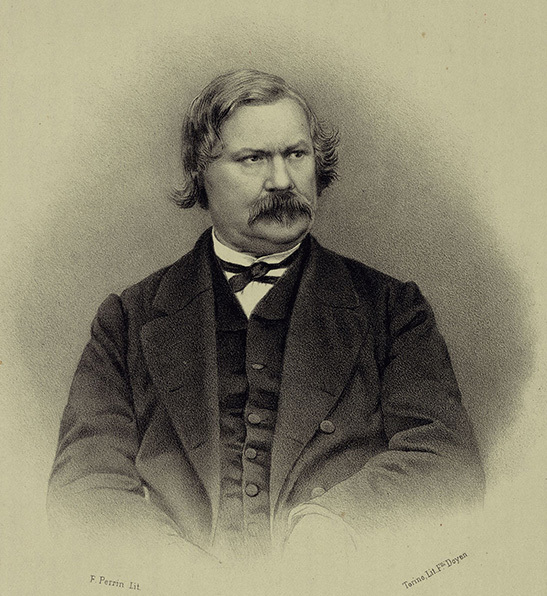
Portrait of Errico Petrella by Émile Perrin

Errico Petrella (10 December 1813 – 7 April 1877) was an Italian opera composer.

== Life and career ==
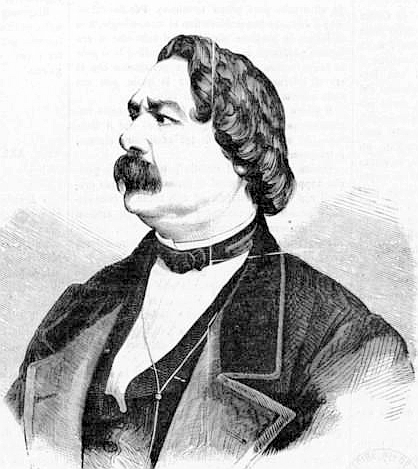
Errico Petrella by Francesco Gonin

Petrella was born at Palermo, capital of the Kingdom of Sicily. A conservative of the Neapolitan school, he was the most successful Italian composer, second only to Verdi, during the 1850s and 1860s. He also earned the latter's scorn for his compositional and dramatic crudities, which nonetheless played well on the stage. Petrella was a popular composer in his day, both of opera buffa and more serious work. His best opera, Jone, has considerable melodramatic force and vitality, and Petrella's melodic style, though old-fashioned in comparison with Verdi's operas of the 1850s, is still appealing.

None of his early works, premiered between December 1829 and 1839, were particularly successful. It was not until Il carnevale di Venezia (Naples, Nuovo, 20 May 1851) that he really became noticed. Elena di Tolosa (Naples, Fondo, 12 August 1852) followed. Finally, in 1854, he took the Italian operatic world by storm with Marco Visconti (Naples, San Carlo, 1854) based on the novel of the same title by Tommaso Grossi. L'assedio di Leida (La Scala, 1856) was his fourth straight triumph, while Jone (La Scala, 1858) was a major event and remained in the repertory well into the 20th century. With two exceptions (La Contessa d'Amalfi and I Promessi Sposi) his operas during the 1860s generally failed.

In 1872 his opera Manfredo, based on Lord Byron's poem, was produced in Naples, starring Gabrielle Krauss in her first appearance in Italy. On this occasion the production was a great success and the composer was presented with a silver crown. Krauss also created a character in Petrella's Bianca Orsini on 4 April 1874.

He died at Genoa three years later, aged 64.

== Major works ==
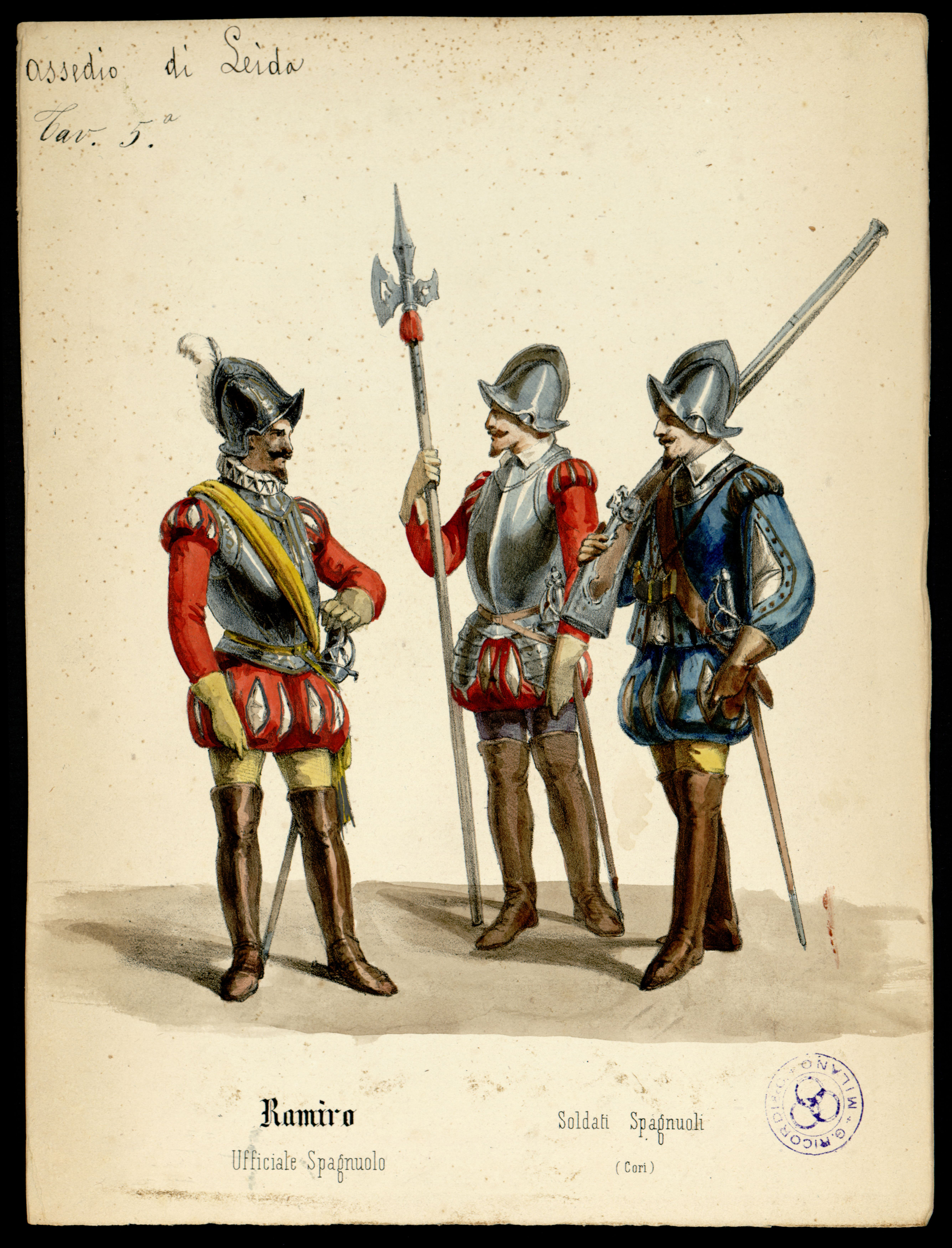
Ramiro, Ufficiale Spagnuolo, e Soldati Spagnuoli, costume design for L'assedio di Leida (1856).

- Il carnevale di Venezia ossia Le precauzioni (1851)
- Elena di Tolosa (1852)
- Marco Visconti (1854)
- L'assedio di Leida o Elnava (1856)
- Jone o L'ultimo giorno di Pompei (1858, libretto by Giovanni Peruzzini)
- La contessa d'Amalfi (1864)
- I promessi sposi (1869)

== Bibliography ==
- Sebastian Werr: Die Opern von Errico Petrella; Edition Praesens, Vienna, 1999
- Sebastian Werr: Errico Petrella. Un compositore al tempo di Verdi, Ribera, 2025
