= Achille Peri =

Italian composer and conductor

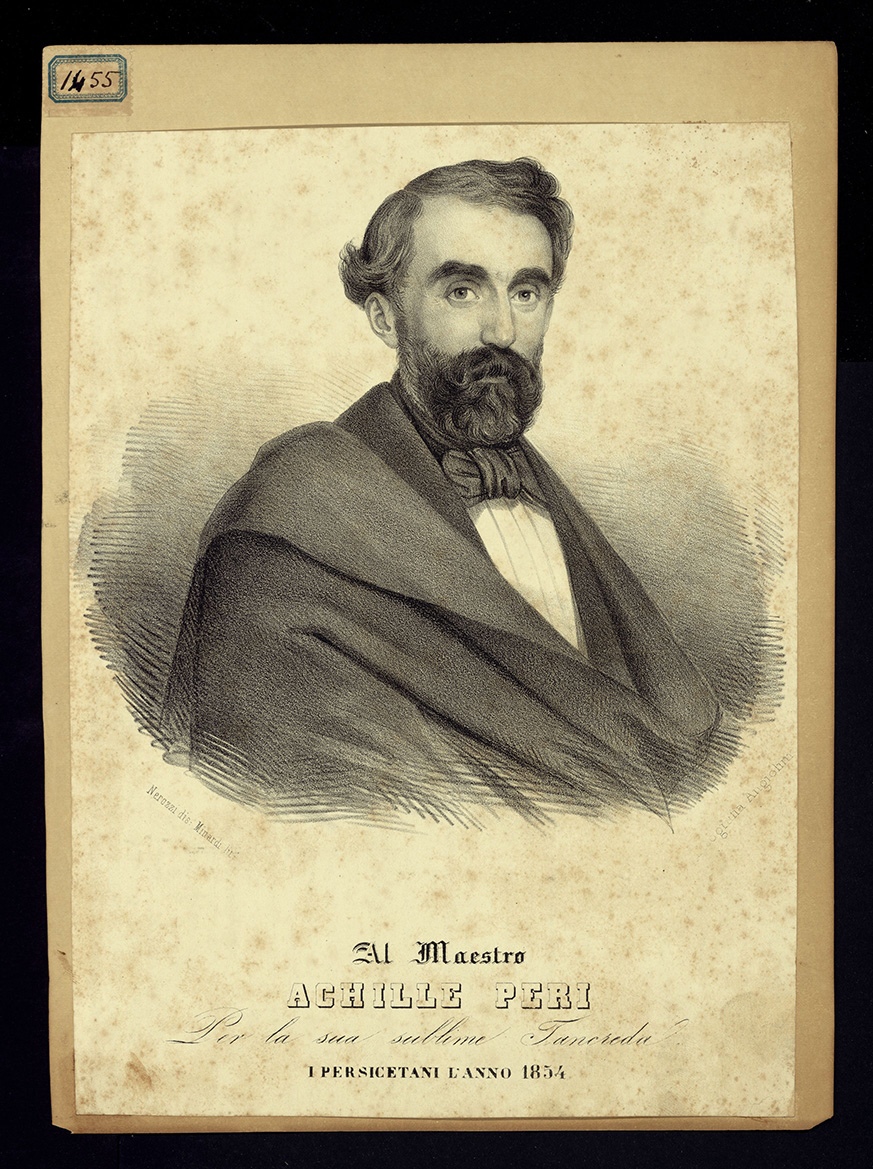
Achille Peri

Achille Peri (20 December 1812 – 28 March 1880) was an Italian composer and conductor. He is best known for his operas which were strongly influenced by the music of Giuseppe Verdi.

== Life and career ==
Born in Reggio Emilia, Peri began his musical education in his native city before pursuing further studies in Paris with Michele Carafa. He founded a touring opera company in Paris, but returned to Italy after it failed. He began working as a conductor at the Teatro Comunale in Reggio Emilia where his first opera, Il solitario, premiered on 29 March 1841. His third opera, Dirce (1843), was the first to enjoy wide success in Italy. This was followed by one of his more popular operas, Tancreda, which premiered at the Teatro Carlo Felice in 1847 and enjoyed revivals at the Teatro Regio di Parma (1852) and the Teatro Comunale di Bologna (1854) among other major theatres. Some of his other successful operas were I fidanzati (1856, Teatro Carlo Felice), Vittore Pisani (1857, Reggio Emilia), and Giuditta (1860, La Scala). In addition to his 10 operas he also produced a modest amount of sacred music. He died in Reggio Emilia at the age of 67.
