= Tommaso Grossi =

Italian poet and novelist (1791–1853)

- Giovanni Carnovali, Portrait of Tommaso Grossi, 1826
- Born: 20 January 1791; Bellano, Duchy of Milan
- Died: 10 December 1853 (aged 62); Milan, Kingdom of Lombardy–Venetia
- Resting place: Cimitero Monumentale, Milan
- Education: University of Pavia
- Occupations: Notary; Writer
- Spouse: Giovannina Alfieri (m. 1838)
- Parent(s): Francesco Grossi and Elisabetta Grossi (née Tarelli)
- Writing career
- Language: Italian; Milanese
- Genres: Novel; Epic poetry
- Notable works: The Lombards in the First Crusade; Marco Visconti
- Movement: Romanticism

Tommaso Grossi (20 January 1791 – 10 December 1853) was an Italian poet and novelist.

== Biography ==
Grossi was born in Bellano, on Lake Como, and graduated in law at University of Pavia in 1810. He then went to Milan to exercise his profession but the Austrian government interfered with his career prospects. Consequently, Grossi was a notary all his life. That the suspicion was well grounded he soon showed by writing the battle poem La Prineide (1814) in Milanese, in which he described with vivid colours the tragical death of Giuseppe Prina, chief treasurer during the Empire, whom the people of Milan, instigated by Austrian agitators, had torn to pieces and dragged through the streets of the town (1814). The anonymous poem—subversive even in being an incunable of the surfacing Western Lombard dialect as a literary language— was first attributed to the celebrated Carlo Porta, but Grossi of his own accord acknowledged himself the author.

In 1816, he published other two poems, written likewise in Milanese: La Pioggia d'oro (The Shower of Gold) and La Fuggitiva (The Fugitive). These compositions secured him the friendship of Porta and Manzoni, and the three poets came to form a sort of literary triumvirate of Romanticism in Lombardy. Grossi took advantage of the popularity of his Milanese poems to try Italian verse, into which he sought to introduce the moving realism which had given such satisfaction in his earliest compositions; and in this he was entirely successful with his poem Ildegonda (1814).

Of the same period is the satirical dialect poem against Classicism, Matrimoni del sur cont Gabriell Verr (1819) written in collaboration with Carlo Porta.

He next wrote an epic poem, entitled The Lombards in the First Crusade, a work of which Manzoni makes honorable mention in The Betrothed (I promessi sposi). This composition, which was published by subscription (1826), attained a success unequalled by that of any other Italian poem within the century; it provided the subject for Giuseppe Verdi's success of 1843, I Lombardi alla prima crociata, premiered in Milan at La Scala.

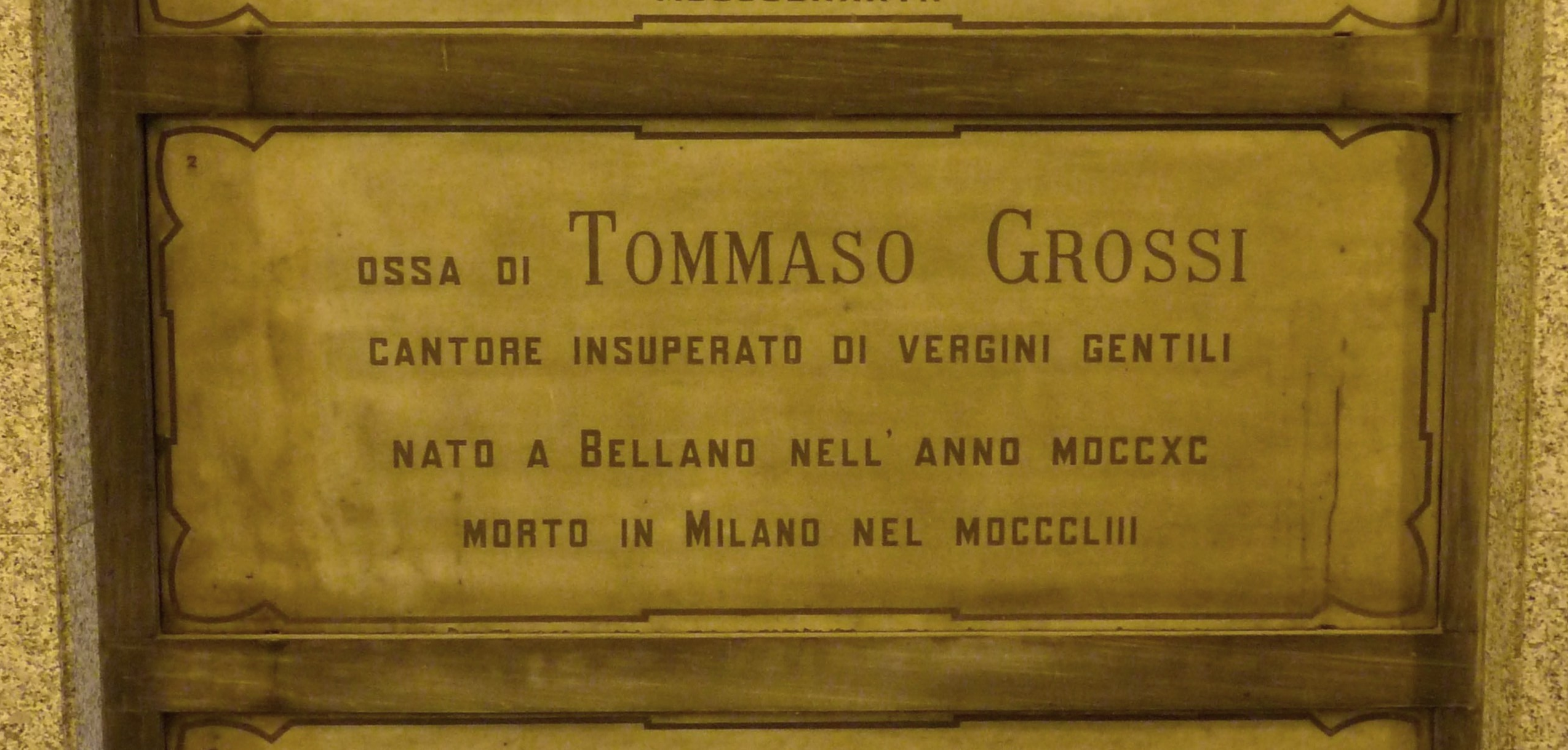
Grossi's grave at the Monumental Cemetery of Milan, Italy

The example of Manzoni induced Grossi to write an historical novel entitled Marco Visconti (1834), a work which contains passages of true description and deep pathos. A little later Grossi published a tale in verse, Ulrico e Lida, but with this publication his poetical activity ceased.

In 1834, he helped organise the "Salotto Maffei," the liberal and patriotic literary salon in Milan hosted by Clara Maffei; there Verdi made his acquaintance. After his marriage in 1838 he continued to employ himself as a notary in Milan till his death.
