= Clara Sinde Ramallal =

Arranger, composer, guitarist and singer

Clara Hilda Sinde Ramallal (born December 28, 1935) is an arranger, composer, guitarist, and singer.

Sinde Ramallal was born in Buenos Aires, where she studied composition, voice, and guitar with Consuelo Mallo Lopez. In 1953, she received an honorary diploma from the Argentine Association for Chamber Music. She toured throughout South America as a singer and guitarist. Later, she performed with the Sinde Ramallal Trio which included two of her students, Gloria Boschi and Silvia Molinari.

Sinde Ramallal premiered works by the composers Elsa Calcagno, Alfonso Galluzzo, and Bianchi Pinero. Her works for guitar are published by Casa Ricordi, and include:

== Composition ==
- Barmi Aire de Milonga

== Arrangements ==
- Allegro, opus 100 (Mario Giuliani)
- Concierto en Re (three guitars; Antonio Vivaldi)
- Prelude No. 1 (Johann Sebastian Bach)
- Rondo No. 2 (Matteo Carcassi)
- Sonata-Gavota (Domenico Scarlatti)

- Hear Clara Sinde Ramallal perform on guitar.
