= Giovanni Canti =

Giovanni Canti was an Italian firm of music publishers and copyists in Milan. It was active from its founding in 1836 until it merged with the firm of music engraver Francesco Lucca in 1878 to form Lucca & Canti. That firm was sold to and absorbed by Casa Ricordi in 1888. Clients of Giovanni Canti included Giuseppe Verdi and Friedrich Kalkbrenner among many others. It published more that 9,500 works during its 42 year long history.

== History ==
Giovanni Canti was founded by the music engraver Giovanni Canti (died 1858) in 1836. Canti had previously worked for Casa Ricordi beginning in the 1820s. The business was originally located at 1042 Contrada S Margherita but in 1865 it moved to new premises at 11 via Meravigli. It also had a store at 2 corsia Giardino. In 1875 it moved again temporarily to 7 via Borromei; only to settle in September 1876 at 3 via Manzoni.

After Giovanni Canti's death, his wife ran the business until his son Carlo Canti took it over in 1861. He ran the business until his death in 1876 at which point his sister (Giovanni Canti's daughter) Anna ran the business until 1878 when it was sold to the widow of Italian music engraver Francesco Lucca (1802-1872). That merged firm, known as Lucca & Canti, was in turn sold a decade later to Casa Ricordi in 1888 at which point it was absorbed into that publishing house.

The firm had over 9,500 publications in its catalogue when it was sold in 1878. The firm is best remembered as Giuseppe Verdi's first publisher; serving as his sole publisher in the 1830s. They also published works by the composer in the 1860s. Friedrich Kalkbrenner was also a client with the firm. Kalkbrenner's arrangements of Beethoven's nine symphonies were published by Canti from 1842-1844.
