= Casa Ricordi =

Italian publisher of sheet music

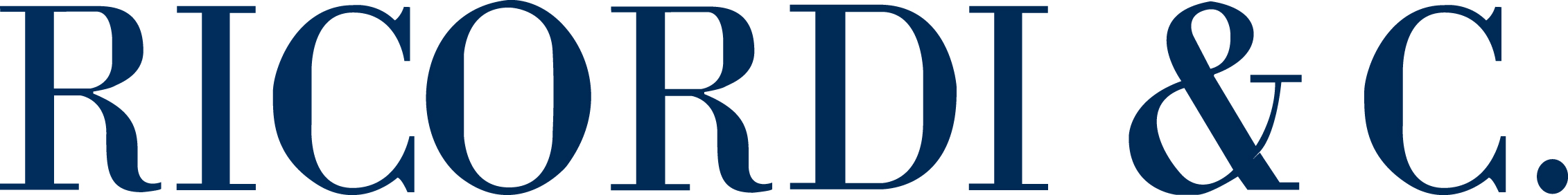
- Parent company: Universal Music Publishing Group
- Founded: 1808; 218 years ago
- Founder: Giovanni Ricordi
- Country of origin: Italy
- Headquarters location: Milan
- Publication types: Sheet music
- Official website: www.ricordi.com

Casa Ricordi is a publisher of primarily classical music and opera. Its classical repertoire represents one of the important sources in the world through its publishing of the work of the major 19th-century Italian composers such as Gioachino Rossini, Gaetano Donizetti, Vincenzo Bellini, Giuseppe Verdi, and, later in the century, Giacomo Puccini, composers with whom one or another of the Ricordi family came into close contact.

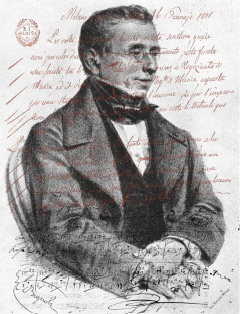
Giovanni Ricordi (1785–1853), founder of Casa Ricordi

Founded in Milan in 1808 as G. Ricordi & C. by violinist Giovanni Ricordi (1785–1853), the Ricordi company became a totally family-run organization until 1919, when outside management was appointed. Four generations of Ricordis were at the helm of the company, Giovanni being succeeded in 1853 by his son Tito (1811–1888) (who had worked for his father since 1825). Tito's son was Giulio (1840–1912). He had also worked for his father, beginning full-time in 1863, and then took over from 1888 until his death in 1912. Finally, Giulio's son, also named Tito, (1865–1933) replaced his father until 1919. By the 1840s and throughout that decade, Casa Ricordi had grown to be the largest music publisher in southern Europe and in 1842 the company created the musical journal the Gazzetta Musicale di Milano.

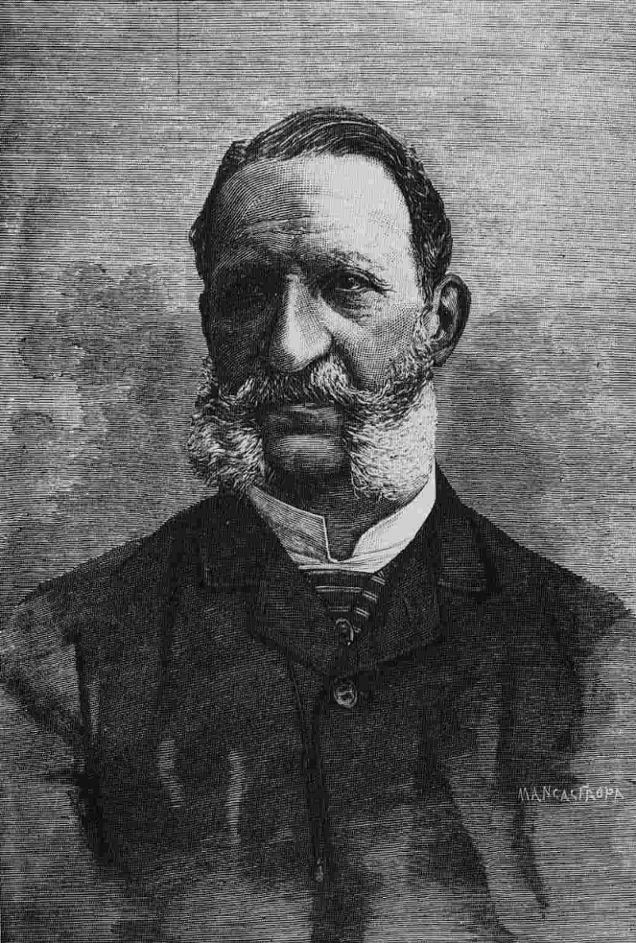
Tito Ricordi, (1811–1888), Giovanni's son

As younger employees under their fathers and then as leaders of the company, the succeeding Ricordis made great strides in establishing publishing relationships with opera houses outside of Milan, including La Fenice in Venice and Teatro San Carlo in Naples. They also established branches of the company within Italy – in 1864 it expanded to Naples and then to Florence (1865), Rome (1871) and Palermo, as well as in London (1875) and Paris (1888). With this expansion under the elder Tito, another of his accomplishments was in modernizing printing methods. With the acquisition of rival publishers, by 1886 Ricordi handled 40,000 editions as well as the Italian rights to Wagner's operas. In the 20th century, the company's expansion continued with acquisitions and new branches, which included those in New York (1911), São Paulo (1927), Toronto (1954), Sydney (1956), and Mexico City (1958).

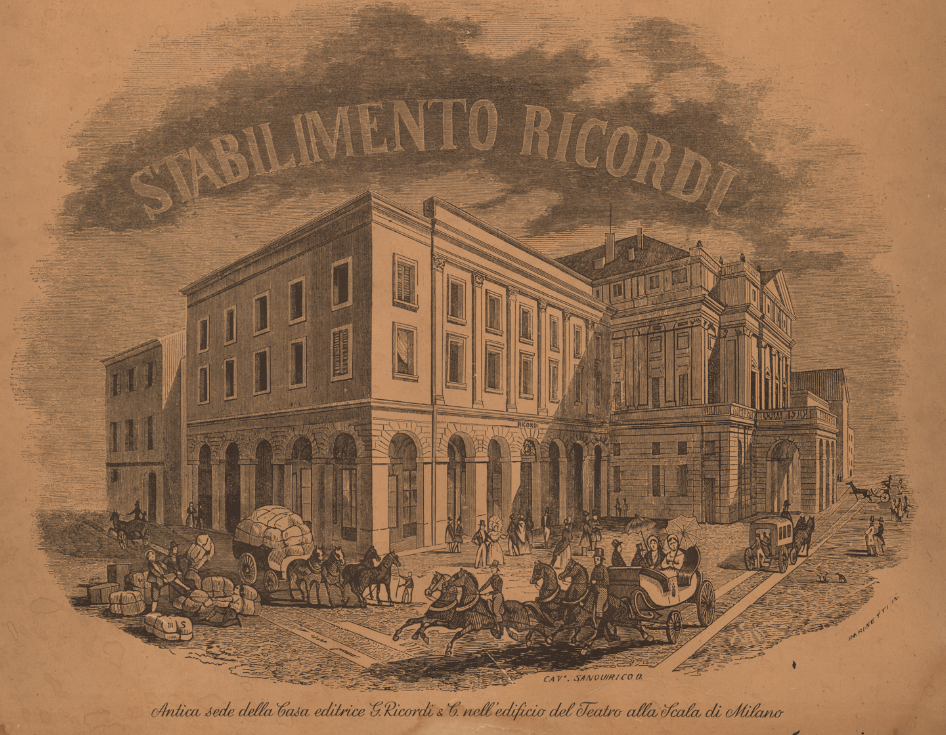
Ricordi Company offices next to La Scala (1844)

In its early days, the company established itself under the portico of the Palazzo della Ragione and then close to the La Scala opera house after 1844, eventually moving to its present location on the via Berchet. However, these premises suffered severe damage from aerial bombardment during World War II, but their collections had already been safely stored away. Following reconstruction after the war, Ricordi was converted to a limited corporation by the family in 1952 and in 1956 it became a publicly traded company. With 135,500 editions by 1991, Ricordi was acquired in 1994 by BMG Music Publishing, which in turn was purchased by Universal Music Publishing Group in 2007. It is now Italy's largest music publisher.

== Beginnings ==
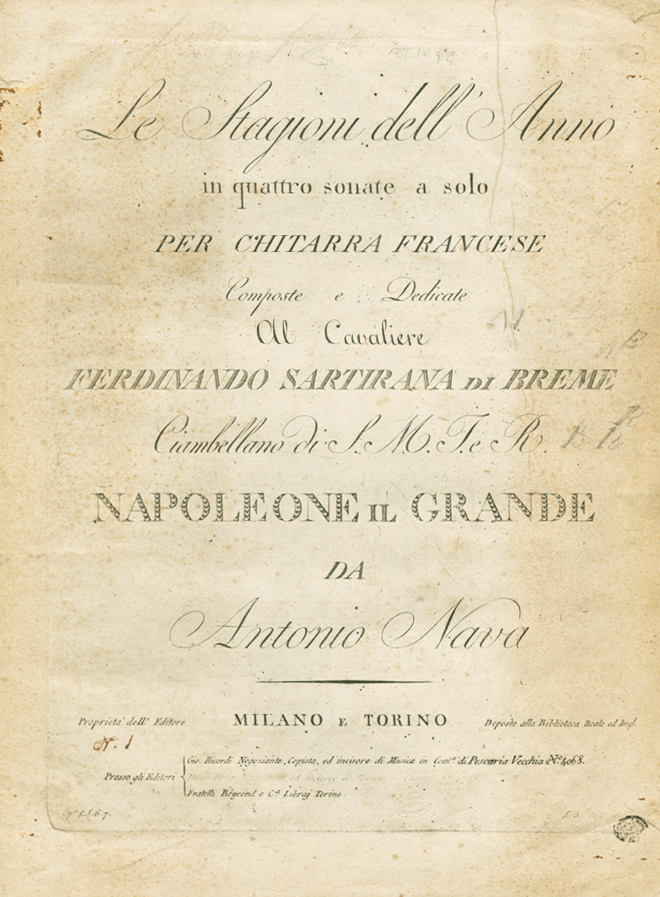
Cover of Ricordi's first publication in 1808

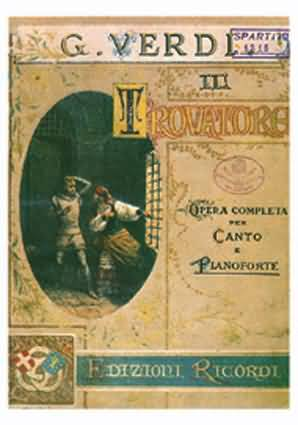
Piano and vocal score for Verdi's Il trovatore

Giovanni Ricordi, a violinist, leader of a small orchestra in Milan, as well as "a genius and positive force in the history of Italian opera," in 1803 had a firm, a copisteria, which specialized in producing manuscript copies of music for local music groups, and very quickly, he became official copyist for two theatres. He entered into what became a short-term partnership with Felice Festa, an engraver and music seller, but that ended in June 1808.

The first work, which the new company published in 1808, was a guitar piece by Antonio Nava. This was followed in 1814 by the first catalogue, which contained 143 items. The 1814 catalogue included mostly piano arrangements of operatic tunes and some individual numbers as well as pieces for guitars, but Macnutt notes the most important single inclusion as being the complete vocal score of Simon Mayr's 1806 opera, Adelasia ed Aleramo, which was regularly performed at La Scala until 1820.

Throughout these years he was acutely aware of the limitations of copyright law, as varied as it was throughout both the country and the continent. While he was able to secure performance rights to individual numbers and then, engraving them onto copper plates, easily make reproductions from there, he found that the full orchestral scores were still guarded in Italy, although German and French publishers were printing entire scores with impunity.

In fact, in regard to the printing of full scores in Italy, Macnutt in his article "Publishing" in Sadie, notes that: "The full scores published in Italy in the first half of the century were eight Rossini scores printed in lithography by [two rival publishers] Ratti Cencetti & Comp. in Rome in the 1820s and a single Bellini opera, Beatrice di Tenda, published by Pittarrelli about 1833, also in Rome."

It was through the gradual accession to the rights to control La Scala's archives, as well as subsequently-produced operas, that he was able to bypass the limitations on publishing full scores, and—as Gossett notes—"not be its employee but a private entrepreneur from whom theatres rented materials". In contrast, many of Ricordi's competitors produced "hackwork manuscripts" in no way based on the composers' autographs. In 1844, the company produced its "Gran Catalogo", which focused on music for the theatre, and included the work of what it called its "house composers," which included Rossini, Bellini, Mercadante, Donizetti and Verdi.

In addition, another of Giovanni's strategies was to acquire—beyond just the publishing rights—the right to represent the composers to the opera companies and theatres that would present their work, so that successive performances elsewhere would bring in additional royalties. In that way, Giovanni and his successors acquired more-or-less total rights to their composers' works. As Rossini's operas gave way to those of Bellini, the rise of Donizetti followed until his death, and then the preeminence of Verdi, the position of each composer was strengthened by this growing strategy.

As business expanded, it became clear to Giovanni that also producing string and choral parts, for which there would be great demand by opera house orchestras, was another means of expanding the firm's involvement and also assuring composers that there would be uniformity. However, although Ricordi began to publish full scores from the 1850s, they were never made available for sale, only for rent to opera houses. Quite quickly, as Verdi's operas became more and more popular, this approach extended to producing all of the orchestral parts for each opera, most especially the three great successes of the 1850s, Rigoletto, Il trovatore, and La traviata, and those that followed when Tito Ricordi headed the firm.

== The company under Giulio Ricordi ==
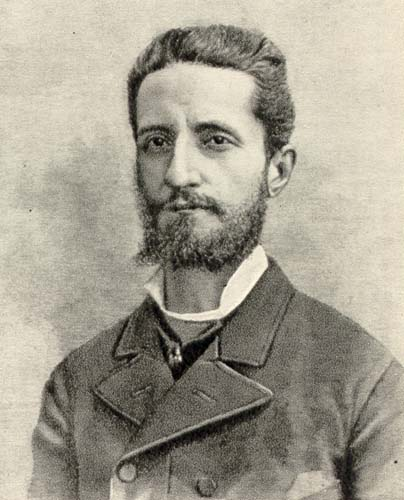
Giulio Ricordi. Tito encouraged his son's involvement with the company from the 1860s and he ran it from 1888 until his death in 1912.

With the nickname Jules Burgmein, Giulio Ricordi contributed to the prestige of the Casa Ricordi as it also produced several magazines (La gazzetta musicale, Musica e musicisti and Ars et labor), and various other once famous publications (La biblioteca del pianista, l'Opera Omnia di Frédéric Chopin, L'arte musicale in Italia, Le Sonate di Domenico Scarlatti).

The Ricordi company also published Giuseppe Verdi's later operas, Giulio having established a relationship with the composer as a young man. Over a ten-year period, he convinced Verdi to give the young librettist and composer Arrigo Boito the opportunity to help him to revise the original 1857 Simon Boccanegra, a "trial run" to plant the idea of Verdi creating a new opera. They presented the revised Boccanegra in March 1881. In alliance with Verdi's wife and Verdi's friend, the conductor Franco Faccio, Ricordi's strategy was to lure the ageing composer out of retirement to compose another opera. While this strategy took some years to achieve, it proved to be successful, as was the opera, Otello, which brought Verdi great acclaim in Milan in 1887. It was followed by Falstaff in 1893, both set to libretti by Boito.

Giulio also had the good sense to promote younger composers of merit, most especially the operatic career of Giacomo Puccini. Others included Amilcare Ponchielli, Alfredo Catalani, Carlos Gomes, Fanny Puzzi, and Umberto Giordano. Their relationship began in 1884 with the company's support for the printing of the libretto of the young Puccini's first opera Le villi without charge, when it premiered on 31 May 1884 at the Teatro Dal Verme.

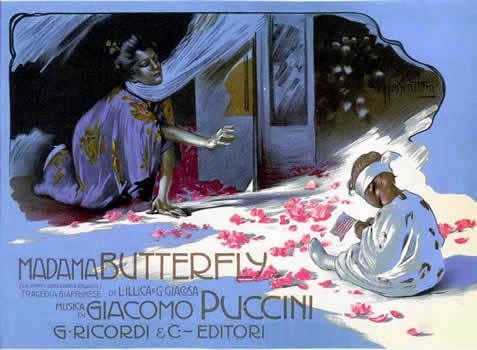
Adolf Hohenstein, Poster for Madama Butterfly for Ricordi, 1914

Fellow students from the Milan Conservatory formed a large part of the orchestra, and the performance was enough of a success that Casa Ricordi purchased the opera. When revised into a two-act version with an intermezzo between the acts, Le villi was performed at La Scala in Milan on 24 January 1885, and the score was published in 1887. To Puccini in particular, Giulio became something of a father-figure, feared (since Giulio often needed to be censorious over Puccini's dilatory work habits) but deeply trusted.

In 1888 the company acquired the music publishing firm of Lucca & Canti; a company which had formed 10 years earlier with the merging of the publishing firms of Giovanni Canti and Francesco Lucca. Canti was notably Verdi's first publisher and Ricordi gained the rights to his early compositions through this acquisition.

Additionally, under Giulio the company went into the business of printing advertising posters that were extremely popular throughout Europe in the late 19th and early 20th centuries. Ricordi company posters included works by celebrated graphic artists such as Leonetto Cappiello, Luigi Emilio Caldanzano, Ludovico Cavaleri, Marcello Dudovich, Adolfo Hohenstein (also known as Adolf), Franz Laskoff, Leopoldo Metlicovitz, Giovanni Maria Mataloni, Aleardo Terzi and Aleardo Villa.

== Relationships with composers ==
Having already acquired the La Scala holdings, in 1839 Giovanni bought the copyright to Giuseppe Verdi's first opera, Oberto, as well as to his future compositions, thus marking the beginnings of a long working relationship with that composer by three generations of Ricordis, most especially Giulio Ricordi. However, it is known that Verdi was unhappy with the elder Tito on occasion over what appeared to be the publisher's "sanctioning, for financial gain, mutilated performances of his works". These concerns carried over to the 20th century.

However, relationships with composers had begun well before 1839. In fact, shortly after Rossini's Tancredi had been staged in Venice in 1813, the composer made the acquaintance of Giovanni, who was then starting his business in Milan although still involved with La Scala. A strong relationship was established between publisher and composer and, between 1846 and 1864, the company published all of his operas for piano and voice, with the composer becoming "...ruefully aware that music which he had reused from what he took to be a failed opera would now [upon publication] be seen to have been recycled." Although Rossini agreed to the publication of his work, it was not without some reservations: writing to Tito Ricordi on 14 December 1864, he accepts that publication will reveal that, "The same pieces of music will be found in various operas," but notes that the time pressure to compose so many works meant that, "I barely had time to read the so-called poetry to set to music." In all, Rossini also worked with three generations of Ricordis.

In 1815, the young Donizetti, then almost 18, traveled from Bergamo to Bologna with the aim of further studies, all this having been orchestrated by his teacher Simon Mayr. In addition to providing money, he equipped his young pupil with two letters, one of which was addressed to Giovanni Ricordi, for whom he had been an editorial consultant for some years. Mayr recommend the young man to the publisher, the result being that Donizetti's first composition to be published, a set of variations on a theme from Mayr's 1813 opera La rosa bianca e la rosa rossa, appeared later that year. It marked the beginning of a lifelong business arrangement between Donizetti and the Ricordi company, except for difficulties in 1839 over the handling of Gianni di Parigi.

By 1840, the firm had control of hiring material for many composers: it had acquired Meyerbeer's Il crociato in Egitto in 1824, followed by 19 operas by Rossini, and eight by Bellini, along with the significant group of today's lesser-known composers such as Saverio Mercadante, Jeanne Rivet, Nicola Vaccai, Giovanni Pacini, and the brothers Luigi Ricci and Federico Ricci. However, in spite of good relationships with their publishers, 19th century composers' scores suffered massive changes from what they originally wrote. Long after the deaths of Rossini, Bellini, and Donizetti, a variety of changes continued to be made to scores at the behest of people such as conductors who (as Gossett notes), if they "want an extra trombone, it was added, and its origin was soon masked...the entire system encouraged a laissez-faire attitude".... It was not until the late 19th century that the full orchestral scores of these four major composers were published by Ricordi and this "marked the beginning of the modern era of publishing".

== The company from the 20th century forward ==
The company under Tito Ricordi II

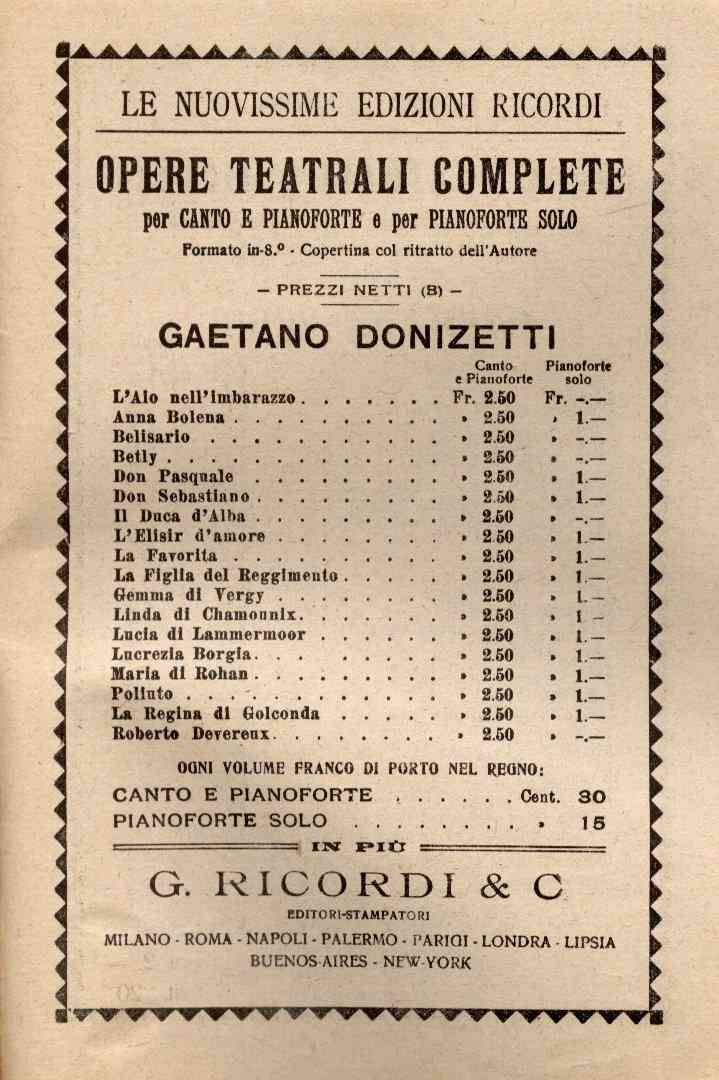
The published works of Donizetti, 1920

With the death of Giulio, the firm was headed by his son, Tito II, who has been described as someone who "lacked both charm and judgement. He and Puccini disliked each other..", the result being that the composer's La rondine was published by a rival company, Sonzogno, which also handled the work of Mascagni and Leoncavallo, "[Puccini's] most successful contemporaries". Upon Tito's retirement in 1919 management passed outside the family, although, with the company's control over the work of Verdi and Puccini, it retained its pre-eminence.

Preparation of critical editions

Many poor quality published scores from the 19th century had been poorly-copied or had become severely cut or severely added-to, leading Macnutt to note that the additions to the scores had created "totally inauthentic versions," which were still being used well into the 20th century by performers: "the widely held view [was] that the existing scores (particularly of operas from the first half of the 19th century) whether for sale or hire, often offer inaccurate or incomplete texts". This led musicologist Philip Gossett to the view that "by the end of the [19th] century, materials rented by Ricordi were frequently far from the composer's original".

Since 1964, under the direction of the company's then-new president, Guido Rignano, critical editions using the composers' autographs and many other sources—including access to the Verdi autographs granted to scholars by the Carrara-Verdi family at the Villa Verdi—have been prepared with increasing cooperation from Ricordi, which has allowed scholars to view the original autographs and has become a collaborator in the preparation of these critical editions.

Under the auspices of the University of Chicago's Center for Italian Opera Studies, Philip Gossett has been General Editor for critical editions of Verdi's operas, as well as those for many of Rossini's operas produced in collaboration with the Fondazione Rossini in Pesaro. Gossett was involved there until 2005; since then he has been working with music publisher Bärenreiter in Germany, which most recently has produced a critical edition of Maometto II soon to be published The Fondazione Donizetti, in the composer's hometown of Bergamo, has been Ricordi's collaborator in the production of critical editions of his operas under the direction of Professor Roger Parker of King's College in London and Gabriele Dotto, who led Ricordi's editorial department from 1992 to 2001.

Similarly, preparation of critical editions of Bellini's operas began in 1999 by Casa Ricordi working in collaboration with the Teatro Massimo Bellini in the composer's hometown of Catania. I Capuleti e i Montecchi was the first to appear under the imprint of the University of Chicago. La sonnambula is also available from Chicago in an edition edited by musicologists Luca Zoppelli of the University of Friborg, Switzerland, and Alessandro Roccatagliati of the University of Ferrara, Italy, members of a group for the Ricordi project, which also includes Fabrizio Della Seta and Claudio Toscani, editor of Montecchi.

All of this cooperation has "served gradually to enhance Ricordi's reputation among scholar and performers" and the extent to which the huge project has already advanced and will advance is illustrated on the Universal Music Publishing Classical Critical Editions website.

Other ventures

Since World War II, these have included such enterprises as Dischi Ricordi, the company's recording label, which began in 1958, but was preceded by the company entering into the popular music business and founding "Radio Record Ricordi" ("RRR") ten years earlier. The first record release was Cherubini's Medea performed by Maria Callas, but the period also saw the beginning of its popular music activities.

Ricordi has also developed a role in the publishing of contemporary music, with a catalogue including the work of Giorgio Battistelli, Luciano Berio, Sylvano Bussotti, Franco Donatoni, Lorenzo Ferrero, Bruno Maderna, Giacomo Manzoni, Kevin Puts, Clara Sinde Ramallal, Nino Rota, Salvatore Sciarrino, Ana Serrano Redonnet, and Fabio Vacchi. This began in 1984 with the world premiere of Prometeo by Luigi Nono to a libretto by Massimo Cacciari, presented under the musical direction of Claudio Abbado.

== See also ==
- Casa Ricordi (film)
