= Ferdinando Provesi =

Italian composer

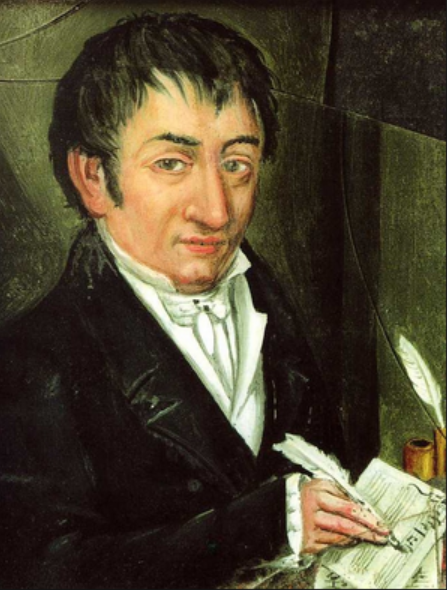
Ferdinando Provesi

Ferdinando Angelo Maria Provesi (1770 – 1833) was a native of Parma, Italy. He was regarded as one of the greatest Italian opera composers of the era. Provesi is best known as being an early tutor of Giuseppe Verdi when he was the Maestro di cappella (master of music) at the St. Bartolomeo cathedral in Busseto (the town very close to Le Roncole, the village where Verdi was born.) Provesi was also director of the municipal music school and local Philharmonic Society. He began teaching Verdi in 1824 when the future composer was 11 years old.

When he died in Busseto in 1833, it opened the way for the young Verdi to apply to take over his post in the town, a post which he held for two-and-a-half years after which Verdi returned to Milan.
