= Giuseppina Strepponi =

Italian opera singer (1815–1897)

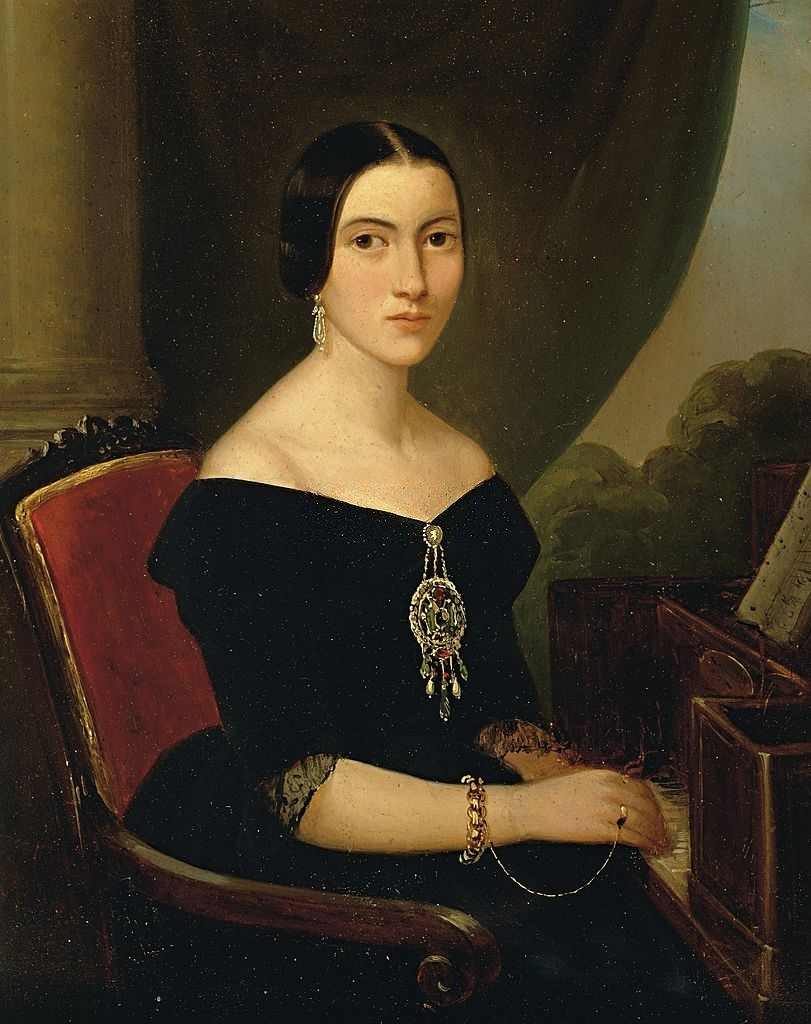
- Portrait by an unknown artist, c. 1845
- Born: Giuseppina Maria Felicita Strepponi; September 8, 1815; Lodi, Kingdom of Lombardy–Venetia
- Died: November 14, 1897 (aged 82); Villanova sull'Arda, Kingdom of Italy
- Occupation: Operatic soprano
- Years active: 1834–1846
- Spouse: Giuseppe Verdi (m. 1859)
- Parent: Feliciano Strepponi (father)

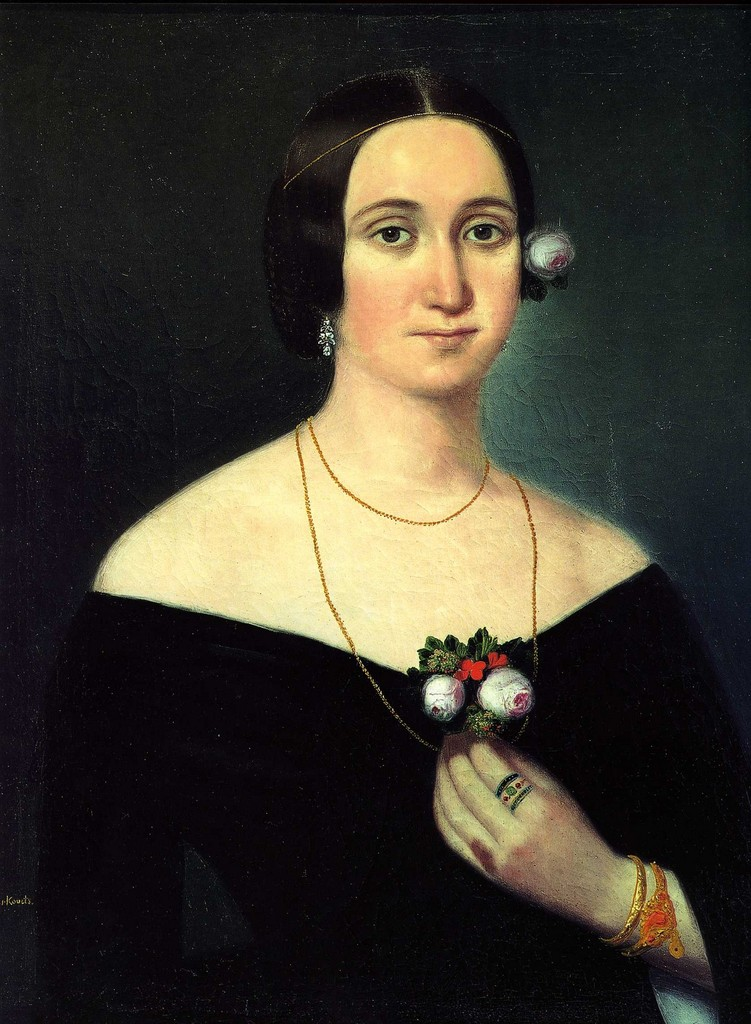
Painting by Karoly Gyurkovich (c. 1860s)

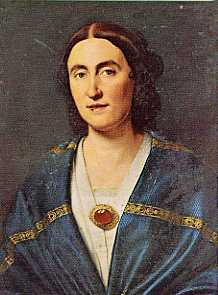
Giuseppina Strepponi (c. 1865)

Clelia Maria Giuseppa (Giuseppina) Strepponi (Lodi, 8 September 1815 – Villanova sull'Arda, 14 November 1897) was a nineteenth-century Italian operatic soprano of great renown and the second wife of composer Giuseppe Verdi.

She is often credited with having contributed to Verdi's first successes, starring in a number of his early operas, including the role of Abigaille in the world premiere of Nabucco in 1842. A highly gifted singer, Strepponi excelled in the bel canto repertoire and spent much of her career portraying roles in operas by Vincenzo Bellini, Gaetano Donizetti, and Gioachino Rossini, often sharing the stage with tenor Napoleone Moriani and baritone Giorgio Ronconi. Donizetti wrote the title role of his opera Adelia specifically for Strepponi. She was described as possessing a "limpid, penetrating, smooth voice, seemly action, a lovely figure; and to Nature's liberal endowments she adds an excellent technique"; her "deep inner feeling" was also lauded.

Both her personal and professional life were complicated by overwork, by at least three known pregnancies, and by her vocal deterioration which caused her to retire from the stage by the age of 31, in 1846 when she moved to Paris to become a singing teacher. While it is known that she had a professional relationship with Verdi from the time of his first opera, Oberto in 1839, they became a couple by 1847 when they lived together in Paris, then moved to Busseto in 1849, married in 1859, and remained together until the end of her life.

== Early life ==
Strepponi was born in the city of Lodi in the Lombard region of Italy. She was the oldest child of Rosa Cornalba and Feliciano Strepponi (1797–1832), who was the organist at Monza Cathedral and a moderately successful opera composer, his works having been performed in theatres in Milan, Turin and Trieste. Her first music lessons were with her father who focused mainly on teaching her to play the piano, but in 1830 she was enrolled in the Milan Conservatory although just over the age of 15. After her father's death at the age of 35 in 1832 of encephalitis, she was able to continue studying singing and the piano as a non-paying pupil at the Conservatory where she notably won first prize for bel canto during her final year in 1834. Her performance of the cavatina from Beatrice di Tenda and for her parts in both a duet and a trio brought mention in the Gazzetta privilegiata di Milano of 29 September 1834, where it was noted that her vocal qualities, "will be a fine acquisition, when the time comes, for the Italian stage".

== Career as an opera singer ==
=== The 1830s ===
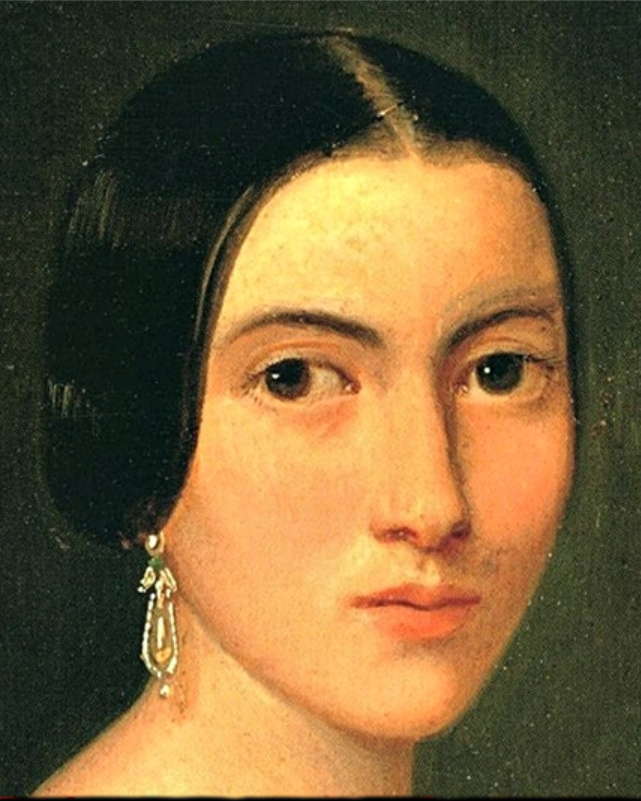
Giuseppina Strepponi in 1835 (Museo di La Scala)

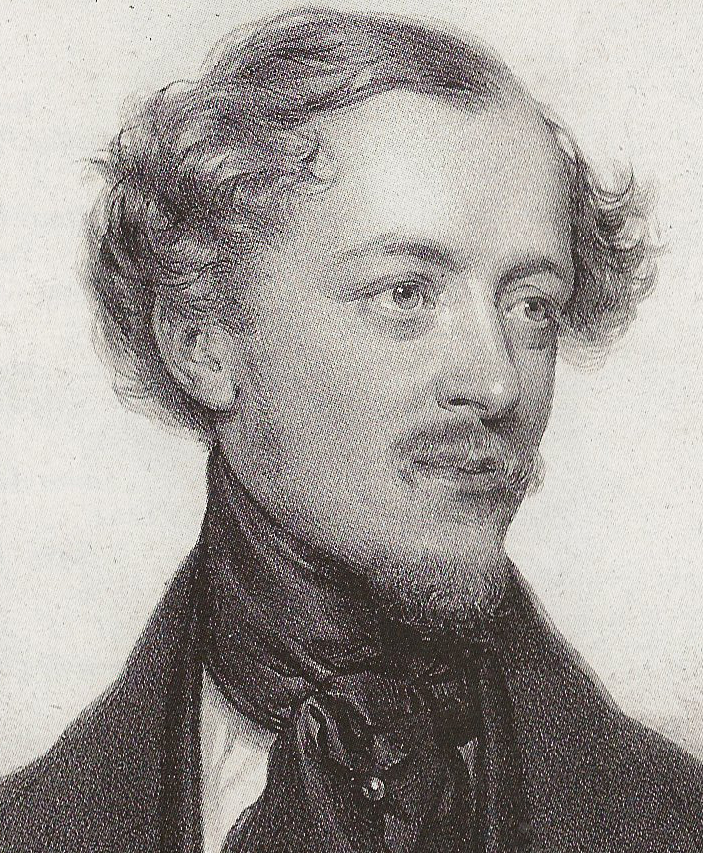
Baritone Giorgio Ronconi

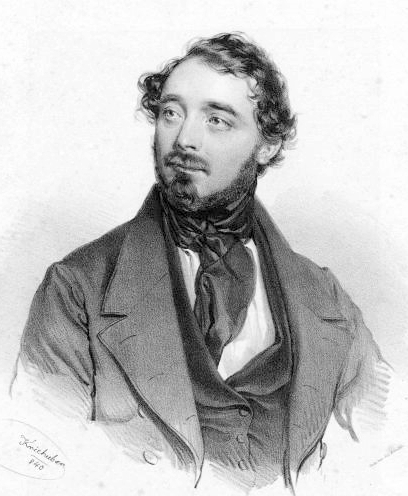
Tenor Napoleone Moriani

Strepponi made her professional opera début in December 1834 as Adria in Luigi Ricci's Chiara di Rosembergh at the Teatro Orfeo. She had her first major success during the following spring at the Teatro Grande in Trieste singing the title role in Rossini's Matilde di Shabran.

This success quickly led to numerous engagements at major opera houses throughout Italy and Giuseppina soon became her family's major breadwinner. In the summer of 1835, she went to Austria to sing Adalgisa in Bellini's Norma and Amina in Bellini's La sonnambula at the Theater am Kärntnertor in Vienna where she was praised highly by audiences and critics. Although she was highly talented, she never sang outside Italy after 1835.

Strepponi became a celebrity among opera singers during the late 1830s, arousing fanatical enthusiasm in performances throughout Italy. In 1836 she sang the roles of Ninetta in Rossini's La gazza ladra, Elvira in Bellini's I puritani, and the title role in Rossini's La Cenerentola at the Teatro La Fenice in Venice.

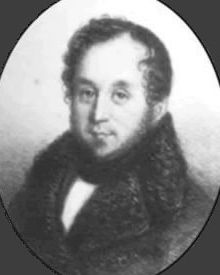
Impresario Alessandro Lanari

In Spring 1837, she went under contract with Alessandro Lanari of Florence, then known as "the king of impresarios", who was able to secure important engagements for her in the years following. However, within a very short time, she found herself pregnant and had to sing through three pregnancies during the time with Lanari.

That same year she reprised the role of Elvira and portrayed the roles of Elena in Donizetti's Marino Faliero and the title role in Donizetti's Lucia di Lammermoor at the Teatro Comunale di Bologna. In 1838 she sang the title roles in Donizetti's Maria di Rudenz, Bellini's Beatrice di Tenda, and Carlo Coccia's Caterina di Guisa at the Imperial Regio Teatro degli Avvalorati in Livorno. She made her La Scala debut in 1839, replacing Antonietta Marini-Rainieri, who was found unsuitable in the work's premiere performance, as Leonora in the first production of Giuseppe Verdi's first opera Oberto. Strepponi's performance was considered one of the strongest aspects of this production and one of the main reasons that the work was received well.

Other notable roles for Strepponi during the late 1830s include Elaisa in Saverio Mercadante's Il giuramento, Adina in Donizetti's L'elisir d'amore and Sandrina in Luigi Ricci's Un'avventura di Scaramuccia. However, the record of constant performances over several years has invited speculation about what that might have done to the quality of her voice in later years.

=== The 1840s ===
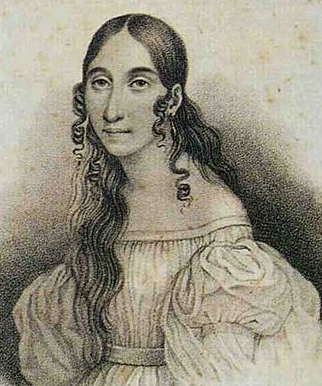
Giuseppina Strepponi (c. 1840)

Returning to Milan for rehearsals of Nabucco, she claimed that illness would prevent future performances in Vienna and asked to be relieved of that obligation. Lanari ordered a complete medical examination which concluded that she had "reached the limits of her endurance" and that she would be obliged to give up her career or else she would become a consumptive. She persisted with Nabucco, singing all eight performances of Verdi's opera: in her words to Lanari, "I dragged myself to the end of the performances" and then told him that she had the possibility of an offer of marriage from a man who would only do so if she were free from contractual obligations. The doctors' conclusions would allow her to do that, but it took her more than a year to recover.

Strepponi continued to remain a highly popular singer during the early 1840s. She notably sang the title role in Donizetti's Adelia in 1841 at the Teatro Apollo in Rome, a role written specifically for her by the composer. This was followed by a critically acclaimed portrayal as Abigaille in the world premiere of Verdi's Nabucco at La Scala in 1842. She reprised the role of Abigaille in several opera houses throughout Italy the following year, including the Teatro Regio di Parma and the Teatro Comunale di Bologna, which considerably aided the work's popularity. Also in 1843, she sang the roles of Elisabetta in Donizetti's Roberto Devereux and Imogene in Bellini's Il pirata in Bologna.

Other notable roles for Strepponi during the early 1840s included the title role in Bellini's Norma, the Marchesa del Poggio in Verdi's Un giorno di regno, and the title role in Giovanni Pacini's Saffo.

Around 1844, Strepponi began to experience significant vocal problems, most likely brought on by her relentless performing schedule, which culminated in a disastrous season in Palermo in 1845, where she was booed by audiences. Her voice never recovered and she thereafter appeared only sporadically in operas until her retirement in February 1846. Most of her last performances were in operas by Verdi, including performances of Elvira in Ernani and Lucrezia Contarini in I due Foscari.

=== Strepponi's children ===
Camillo Cirelli (whom Verdi had met while a student of Lavigna's some years before) was one of a group of three theatrical agents under Lanari who took responsibility for Strepponi from Milan after the early months of 1837. He also engaged her for the Teatro San Benedetto in Venice, but it was not uncommon for her to work under other impresarios. However, she became pregnant around March/April 1837 and she stopped singing only about a month before her first child, Camillo Luigi Antonio, was born in Turin in January 1838 and baptised as "Sterponi" (sic). From her performance records of these two years, Frank Walker corroborates the fact that she was absent from the stage for about three months, and then began another hectic round of performances under an exclusive contract with Lanari announced in February 1838. Cirelli believed that he was the father, although Frank Walker states that he proved to be a very good friend and that "it is possible that he had been Camillino's godfather, and given him his Christian name".

However, sometime in the Spring of 1838, Strepponi became pregnant again and, in Florence on 9 February 1839, she gave birth to her second child, Giuseppina Fausta, only a few hours after completing a performance at the Teatro Alfieri and before leaving for an engagement in Venice. The child was placed in the turnstile for abandoned infants at the Ospedale degli Innocenti in Florence under the name of "Sinforosa Cirelli". These children were known as the esposti, "the exposed", or as described by Phillips-Matz, "society's trash". Cirelli, who had returned to Milan, initially denied paternity, believing that she had taken another lover. But Cirelli then accepted paternity when the child was born prematurely and there was no time for her to be taken to somewhere private for the birth.

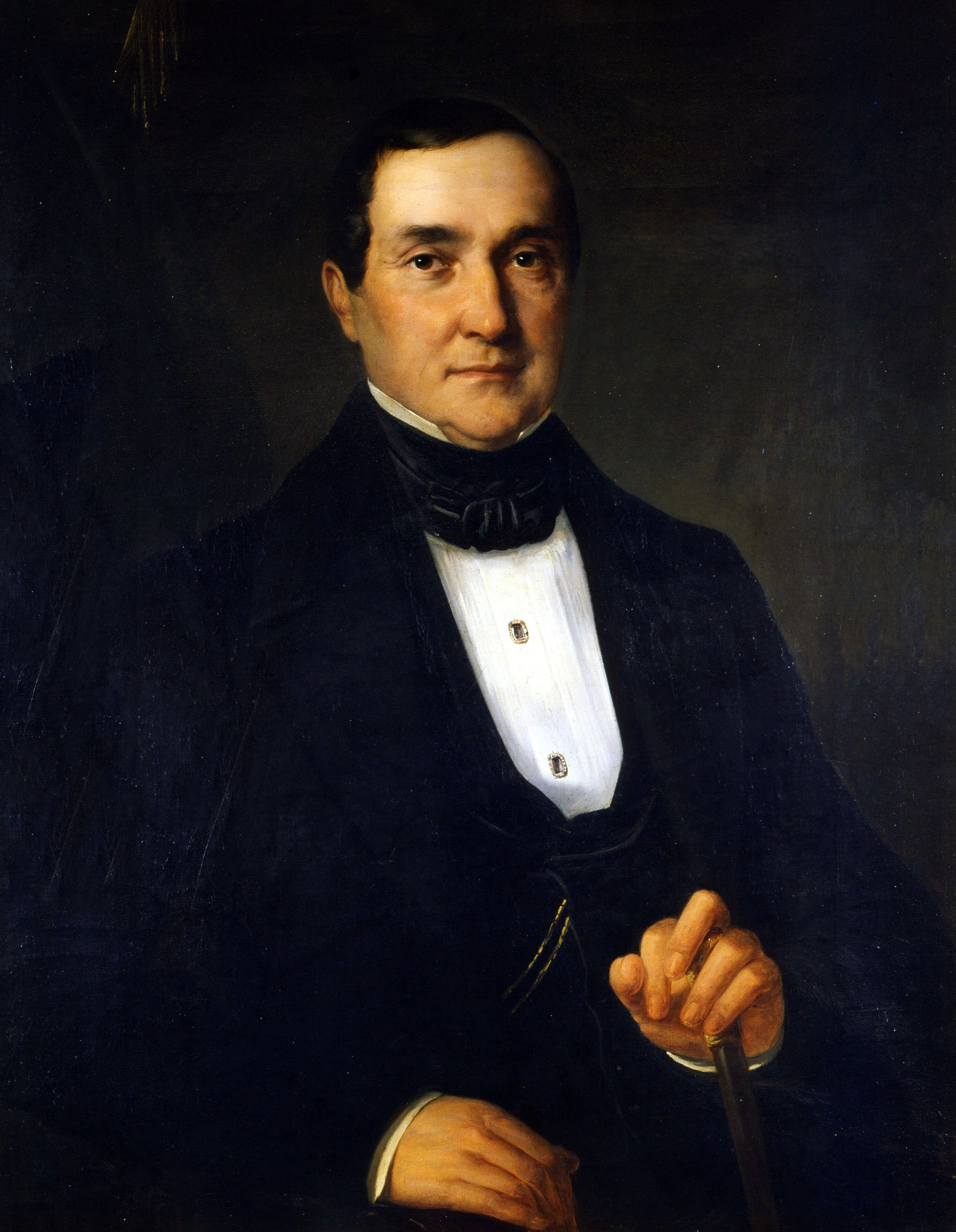
Impresario Bartolomeo Merelli

In late 1838, Lanari and Bartolomeo Merelli, the impresario of La Scala, had negotiated for Strepponi, Moriani, and Ronconi to appear in La Scala for the following spring season, but they had both been horrified to find out in early January that she was five months pregnant, and that this would cause her to be unavailable. But in February 1839 in Florence, she sang in Il giuramento with such dramatic intensity that it appears to have caused her to miscarry and, by necessity, withdraw from further performances for some time. Increasingly pressured by Lanari, she finally relented to appear at La Fenice, where she was a triumph in March. By April 1839 she was in Milan to fulfill those engagements, and her La Scala debut in I Puritani on 20th was another triumph. By March 1840, it appears that she may have given birth to a stillborn girl since Phillips-Matz notes that a combination of time taken out of her working schedule corresponds to around the 22 March records showing parents abandoning her in the parish in which she lived.

Performances in Florence in March and early April 1841 in I Puritani were the last which Strepponi gave with both Ronconi and Moriani, the latter then leaving for Vienna and Dresden, she and Ronconi going on to the other Italian towns. Later in the year, as the 1841–42 season was being planned, Walker states that "she knew quite well that she would not be able to carry out the whole of this programme, for she was again pregnant." During the following few months, letters between Strepponi and Lanari, in whom she had clearly confided, reveal the existence of "the despicable M ..." (and in another letter, he is "Mr. Mo..."), and she asks that he "kindly remind him of the important sum of money that through your offices he has agreed to pay." On 16 August she wrote again to Lanari, stating that "I have been too cruelly treated under the mantle of love ... But I do not wish him ill."

All of Frank Walker's investigations, using letters and performance histories of the different people involved in her life, put Strepponi together with only one man at the time that the three children must have been conceived. He concludes that it is the only man who must have been the father of the first two children, and who was then the prospective father of the third: it is Napoleone Moriani. Giuseppina had given birth to a girl in Trieste on 4 November 1841, Adelina Rosa Maria Carolina Strepponi. It appears that she then left the baby with a couple, the Vianellos, who took in illegitimate children. However, the child died of dysentery on 4 October 1842. Strepponi left for Venice with Cirelli with whom she had been living in Milan as a common law wife.

An early 20th-century biography of Verdi, as well as one written in 1938 about Strepponi's life by Mercede Mandula, both propose that Strepponi became Merelli's lover in the early 1840s and it is claimed that this relationship resulted in another illegitimate child. However, this account is vehemently disputed by both Frank Walker, who declares "but it is not true: it is fiction", as well as biographer Gabriele Baldini, who states "that it is certain that Giuseppina was not Merelli's lover, that she had no sons by him ...". Verdi's biographer, Mary Jane Phillips-Matz, in her account of Strepponi's life both before and after becoming Verdi's partner and then his wife, lays out in detail the singer's history up to the time of Nabucco and her investigations have produced no evidence of the accuracy of the early scenario.

== Retirement in Paris ==
=== With Verdi, 1847 to 1849 ===
In October 1846 Strepponi moved to Paris and became a singing teacher. She came out of her stage retirement briefly for one last opera appearance at the Comédie-Italienne which was not well received. Verdi, who was in England for the premiere of his opera I masnadieri in July 1847, returned via Paris and the two began a romantic relationship, with the composer remaining there for two years (albeit with short periods in Italy to firstly return to Milan in April 1848 after the nationalistic uprising there and then to oversee production of his new opera in Rome, La battaglia di Legnano in early 1849.

== Return to Italy with Verdi, July 1849 ==
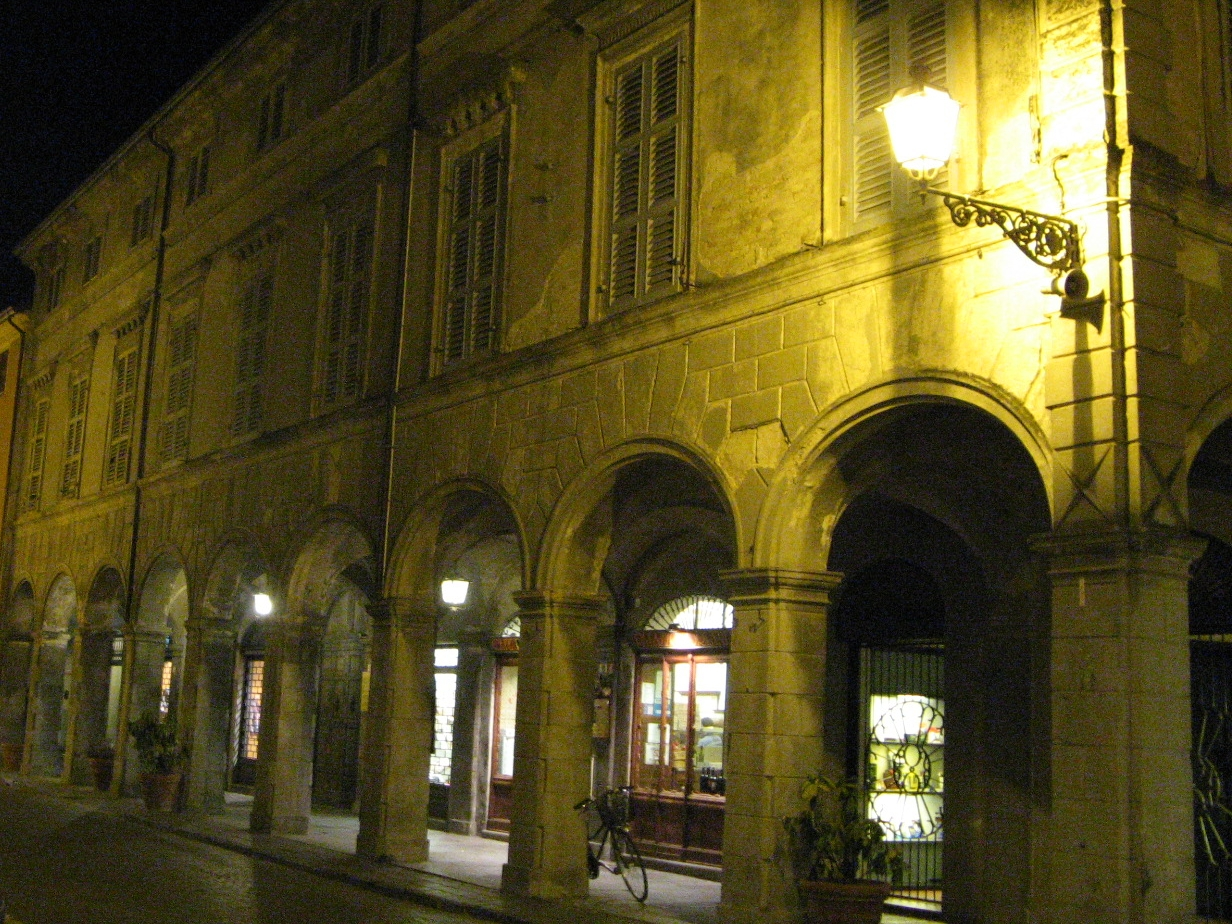
Palazzo Orlandi, 56 Via Roma in Busseto

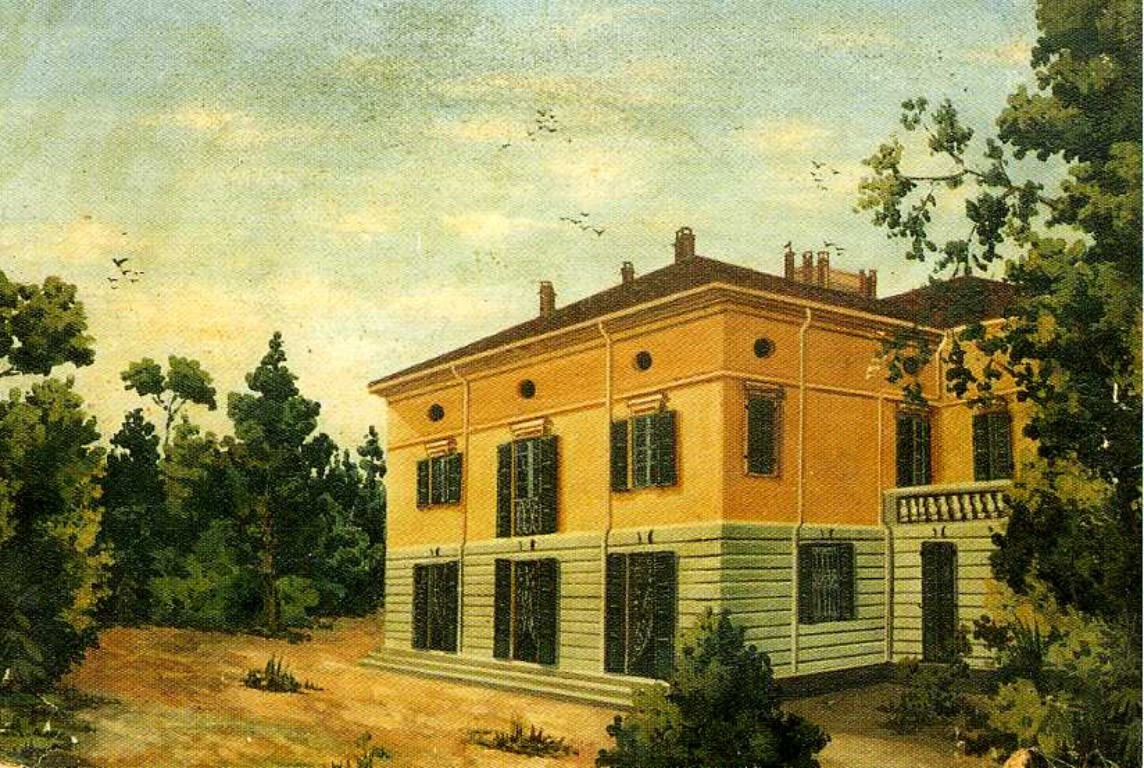
Villa Sant'Agata (Villa Verdi) Sant'Agata

The couple returned to Italy by July 1849 and began living together in Busseto, Verdi's hometown where they first lived at the Palazzo Orlandi. The reaction of many of the people of Busseto towards Giuseppina, a woman of the theatre living openly with the composer in an unmarried state concerned Verdi, and as such, she was shunned in the town and at church. While Verdi could "treat the Bussetani with contempt ... Giuseppina, in the next few years, suffered greatly."

From May 1851 they moved to Verdi's house in Sant'Agata just outside the town, which today is known as the Villa Verdi.

Although unmarried until 1859, the couple remained together for the rest of their lives and she supported her husband in his career in many ways, her knowledge of French and English being especially useful. It is even thought that it was she who translated the original play by Antonio García Gutiérrez, El trovador of 1836, which became Il trovatore in 1853. Julian Budden notes that a letter from her to Verdi two weeks before the premiere urges him to "hurry up and give OUR [her caps] Trovatore".

In other respects, she offered him much advice and, as Walker recalls from her account of being curled up in an armchair nearby, all the while offering comments and criticism while Verdi was composing, he speculates that "she must have sung many of these world-famous melodies for the first time from the manuscript sketches." At one point he took her advice not to have to compose on order by a certain date, but to find a suitable subject, then compose the music at his own convenience and then find a suitable venue and suitable singers, and he so informed Corticelli, the theatrical agent from Bologna.

Their marriage was happy and Verdi was deeply saddened by her death at Sant'Agata in 1897.

== The last years ==
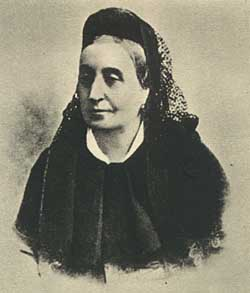
Giuseppina Strepponi, last portrait (1897)

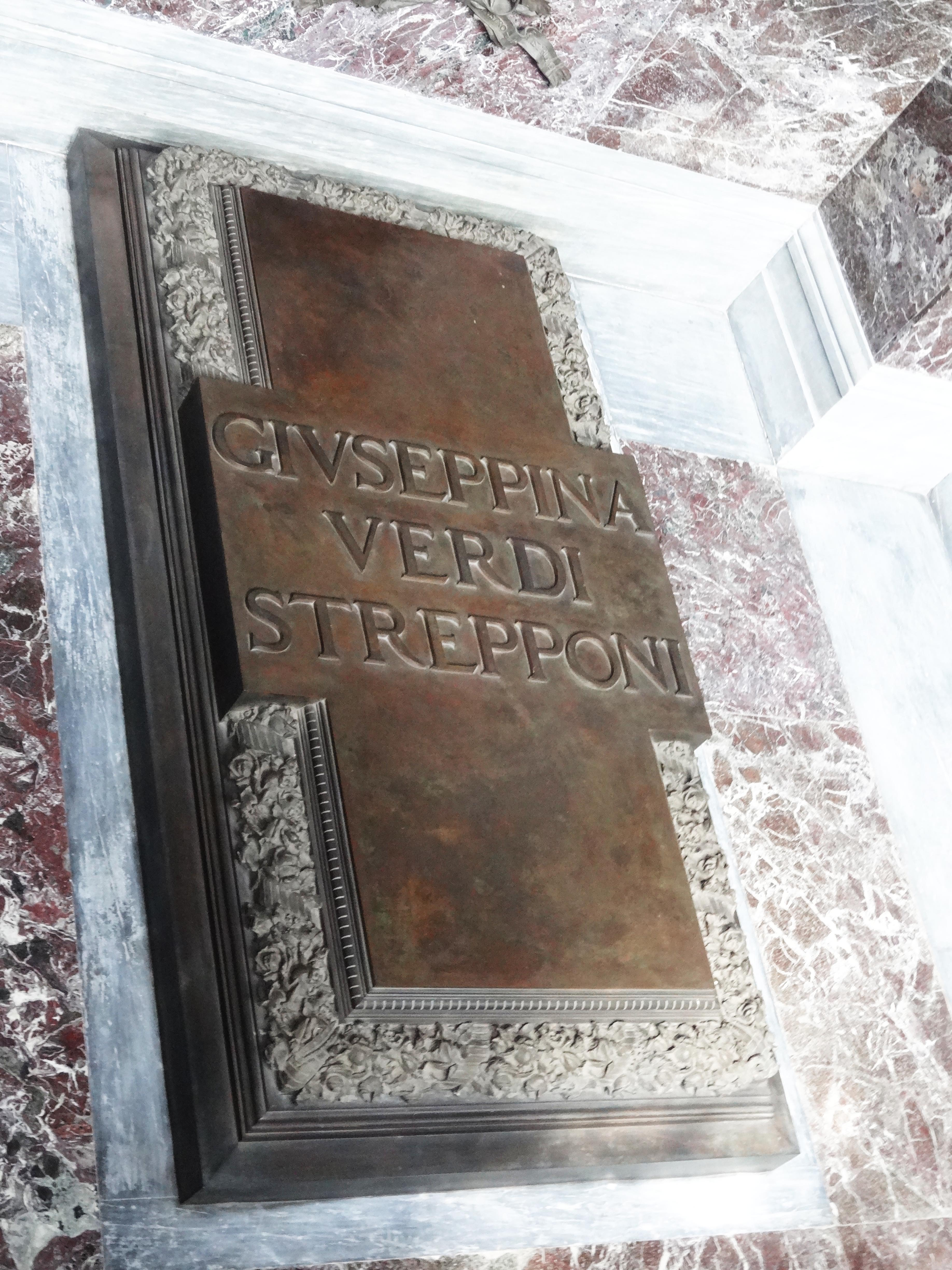
Grave of Giuseppina Strepponi in Milan

In 1894, Verdi and his wife made their last trip to Paris. Hungarian writer Dezső Szomori, who knew them at that time, then described Verdi as a man with small eyes and next to him a woman, Giuseppina, who looked more like an old bird, but ultimately concluded: "a beautiful and charming couple who grew up together and grew old in the music world."

In those years, Strepponi frequently suffered from stomach problems and arthritis and during her last year of life she could barely move from her bed. In the autumn of 1897, when the couple was once again preparing to spend the winter in Genoa in a more salubrious climate with proximity to the sea, Verdi made the decision to stay in Sant'Agata because his wife was bedridden. Giuseppina Strepponi died after a long illness on 14 November that year at Sant'Agata, due to pneumonia. She was initially buried in Milan. With the death of Giuseppina, Verdi became a widower for the second time and was once again tormented by the pain of losing one of the most important figures in his life. When Verdi died in 1901 he left instructions in his will to be buried next to Giuseppina, but he was buried in the main cemetery of Milan. The desire to see the couple together in the afterlife eventually led on 26 February 1901 to the transfer of both of their bodies to the oratory of the Casa di Riposo in Milan, the retirement home for musicians which Verdi had created. Arturo Toscanini directed a choir of 900 singers in the famous Va, pensiero from Nabucco.

== Depictions in media ==
- After Aida: Strepponi is one of the main characters in Julian Mitchell's 1985 play-with-music, which focuses on Verdi's life and compositions after 1879 and in persuading him to compose Otello
- Risorgimento! (2011), the opera by Italian composer Lorenzo Ferrero.
- Verdi und die Dame mit Noten, opera by Mathias Husmann (b. 1948), premiered at the Hamburger Kammeroper in 2015, conducted by Florian Csizmadia.
- In November 2001, Tell Giulio the Chocolate is Ready, a radio play by Murray Dahm, was produced and broadcast by Radio New Zealand. The play is based on the letters of the Verdi-Boito correspondence and explores the genesis and production of Verdi and Boito's opera Otello including the role played by Giuseppina Strepponi. The play and broadcast included those sections of the opera as they appeared in the correspondence (such as Iago's Credo).

DVD 'Giuseppe Verdi' 2005 published by 'House of knowledge' Semi documentary biography of the composer's life and works. Ronald Pickup. An excellent well-documented dramatisation.
