= Raffaele Ferlotti =

Italian opera singer (1819–1891)

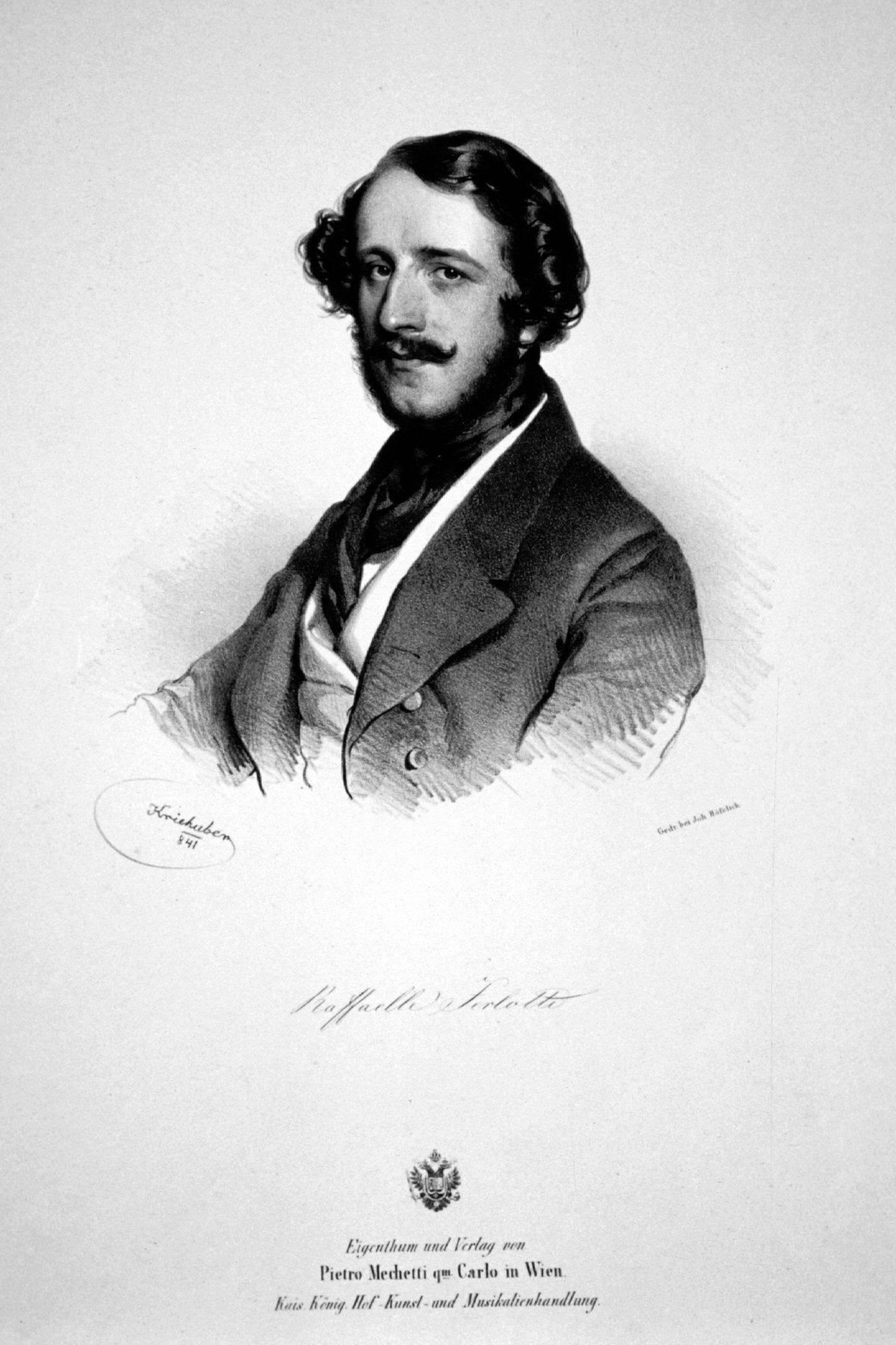
- Raffaele Ferlotti, Lithograph by Josef Kriehuber, 1841
- Born: 27 February 1819; Bologna, Italy
- Died: November 11, 1891 (aged 72); Bologna
- Occupation: Italian operatic baritone
- Years active: 1830s–1860s

Raffaele Ferlotti (27 February 1819 – 11 November 1891) was an Italian operatic baritone who had an active international career from the 1830s through the 1860s. He was a regular performer in Italy's leading opera houses, especially La Scala, and created roles in several world premieres. On the international stage he performed in operas in Austria, England, France, and Spain.

== Life and career ==
Born in Bologna, Ferlotti was the son of choreographer Nicola Ferlotti and ballerina Paola Scutelari. His older sister was the soprano Santina Ferlotti-Sangiorgi. The first known performance by Ferlotti was as concert soloist in Ravenna in 1835. Later that year he appeared at the Teatro Comunale in Faenza as Bartolomeo in Gaetano Donizetti's Il furioso all'isola di San Domingo. He was soon invited to make appearances at major opera houses throughout Italy. In 1836 he appeared at the Teatro Comunale di Bologna as Tartufo in Carlo Coccia's Clotilde. He returned to that house in 1842 to sing the title role in Federico Ricci's Corrado d'Altamura. In 1838 he made his debut at the Teatro Regio di Parma as Israele in Donizett's Marino Faliero. He returned to that theatre in 1841 to portray Enrico Ashton in Donizetti's Lucia di Lammermoor with Teresa De Giuli Borsi in the title role. He also appeared in Parma in 1842 as Contareno in Henri Cohen's Antonio Foscarini, Don Alfonso d'Este in Donizetti's Lucrezia Borgia, and Publio in Saverio Mercadante's La vestale.

In 1840 Ferlotti arrived at La Fenice where he appeared as Assur in Gioachino Rossini's Semiramide, the Count of Vergy in Donizetti's Gemma di Vergy, Giorgio Talbot in Maria Stuarda, and Guido della Torre in Alessandro Nini's Ida della Torre. On 5 September 1840 he made his debut at La Scala as the Cavaliere di Belfiore in the world premiere of Giuseppe Verdi's Un giorno di regno. Although that opera was a failure, he sang two more roles at that house later that year to much greater success: Briano in Otto Nicolai's Il templario and Ernesto in Vincenzo Bellini's Il pirata. He returned to La Scala several more times during his career, notably performing in the world premieres of Temistocle Solera's Il contadino d'Agleiate (1841), Achille Graffigna's Ildegondo e Rizzario (1841), Ruggero in Giovanni Pacini's L'ebrea (1844), Luigi Petrali's Sofonisba (1844), and in such roles as the Count of Vergy in Donizetti's Gemma di Vergy (1842) and Ernesto Malcolm in Giovanni Pacini's Maria, regina d'Inghilterra (1843).

In 1845 Ferlotti appeared in operas by Verdi and Donizetti at the Teatro Real in Madrid. In 1848 he performed as a guest artist at the Teatro di San Carlo in Naples as Don Alfonso d'Este in Donizetti's Lucrezia Borgia, Israele Bertucci in Marino Faliero, and the title hero in Verdi's Nabucco. He sang Don Alfonso d'Este there again in 1849 and in 1850 was heard in Naples as Severo in Donizetti's Poliuto. In 1855 he portrayed the Miller in Verdi's Luisa Miller at the Teatro Argentina in Rome. In 1858–1859 he was committed to the Liceu in Barcelona. He also performed as a guest artist at the Paris Opera, the Royal Opera House in London, and the Vienna State Opera. After retiring from the stage in the early 1860s, he taught singing in Bologna at a school he founded with his sister around 1850. One of his students there was his niece, Giuseppina Vitali, who followed in his footsteps on stages throughout Europe as an opera singer. He died in Bologna in 1891 at the age of 72.
