= Superchi =

Superchi is a surname. Notable people with the surname include:

- Antonio Superchi (1816–1893), Italian operatic baritone
- Franco Superchi (born 1944), Italian footballer
