= Mary Jane Phillips-Matz =

American biographer, essayist and musicologist (1926–2013)

Mary Jane Phillips-Matz (January 30, 1926 – January 19, 2013) was an American biographer and writer on opera. She is mainly known for her biography of Giuseppe Verdi, a result of 30 years' research and published in 1992 by Oxford University Press. Born in Lebanon, Ohio and educated at Smith College and Columbia University, she lived for many years in Italy, and even after her return to the United States in the early 1970s spent her summers in Verdi's hometown of Busseto where she continued her exhaustive research into his life. She died in New York City at the age of 86

== Biography ==
Mary Jane Phillips was born in Lebanon, Ohio to William Mason Phillips and Hazel Spencer Phillips. Her mother was the author of several books on Ohio history and folklore. She grew up in Dayton and acquired her interest in opera as a child from family excursions to the Cincinnati Zoo where the price of admission included a free performance by Cincinnati Opera in the zoo's pavilion. After earning a bachelor's degree in medieval literature and modern European history in the late 1940s from Smith College and a master's degree from Columbia University, she began a 50-year period of contributing to Opera News. She married Charles Albert Matz Jr., a writer and literary historian, in 1950 while still a Masters student at Columbia and published under the name Mary Jane Matz until the couple divorced in 1977.

Her first book, Opera Stars In The Sun: Intimate Glimpses Of Metropolitan Personalities was published in 1955 and dedicated to her parents. The 1960s saw the publication of two more books, a biography of the philanthropist and arts patron Otto Kahn and Opera: Grand and Not So Grand. The latter was an analysis of the modern opera business which she characterized as "monstropera", contrasting what she felt was its dehumanized, bourgeois approach with its past as a flamboyant yet more human spectacle. During the 1960s and early 1970s Phillips-Matz lived in Venice with her young family. She continued her research and writing and also taught English to the employees of Venice's public boat system. She and her husband became friends with Olga Rudge and Ezra Pound who lived nearby and introduced Pound to Gian Carlo Menotti, another old friend. During this time, Phillips-Matz was also general manager, fund-raiser, and public relations director for Menotti's Festival dei Due Mondi in Spoleto.

Although she returned the United States and settled in Manhattan in the early 1970s, Phillips-Matz spent part of every year in Busseto, where Verdi spent many of his early years, where she lived in an old rectory rented to her by the local priests and continued her exhaustive research into the composer's life. She was one of the founders of the American Institute for Verdi Studies at New York University in 1976 and served as its co-director with Andrew Porter. Over the years, she was instrumental in helping the institute acquire microfilm copies of correspondence and documents relating to Verdi from numerous collections in Italy, including those at Verdi's Sant'Agata estate.

Her 900-page Verdi: A Biography was published by Oxford University Press in the UK in 1992 and in the US the following year. It has since been published in multiple editions and translated into French and Spanish. The biography won the Royal Philharmonic Society Book Award in 1993 and the ASCAP Deems Taylor Award in 1994. Edward Rothstein writing in The New York Times called it an "important biography" which "provides us with a more complicated portrait of the man than we have had so far." The new light shed on Verdi's life by Phillips-Matz's book included evidence that Verdi's family roots and his own emotional ties were actually in the Province of Piacenza, rather than Parma, and that far from being poor, his father had owned a substantial amount of land and could read and write at a time when 90% of Italians were illiterate. More controversially, she found evidence suggesting that Giuseppina Strepponi gave birth to a daughter in 1851 while she was Verdi's mistress but years before they married. The child was abandoned at an orphanage in Cremona but then entrusted to the care of a family living near Verdi's estate at Sant' Agata.

Biographies of the opera singers Rosa Ponselle and Leonard Warren followed in 1997 and 2000, the latter a commission from the Leonard Warren Foundation. Her last major work was her biography of Giacomo Puccini, published in 2002, although she continued to lecture and in 2005 wrote the text for a book commemorating the 50th anniversary of the Washington National Opera. Phillips-Matz died at her home in Manhattan, near Verdi Square shortly before her 87th birthday

== Works ==
In addition to the following books and her articles for Opera News, Phillips-Matz also wrote regular program notes for London's Royal Opera House, essays in The Cambridge Companion to Verdi and The Puccini Companion, and feature articles for Playbill. Among the many opera libretti published by the Metropolitan Opera which she translated and annotated were Verdi's Falstaff, Simon Boccanegra, I Lombardi alla prima crociata, and Don Carlos.

=== Books ===
- Opera Stars In The Sun: Intimate Glimpses Of Metropolitan Personalities, 1955, Farrar, Straus & Cudahy
- The Many Lives of Otto Kahn, 1963, Macmillan (2nd edition published 1984, Pendragon Press)
- Opera: Grand and Not So Grand, 1966, William Morrow and Company
- Verdi il grande gentleman del Piacentino, 1992, Banca di Piacenza (republished in 2013 to mark the bicentenary of Verdi's birth)
- Verdi: A Biography, 1992 Oxford University Press
- Rosa Ponselle: American Diva, 1997, Northeastern University Press
- Leonard Warren: American Baritone, 2000, Amadeus Press
- Puccini: A Biography, 2002, Northeastern University Press
- Washington National Opera, 1956–2006, 2005, Washington National Opera
