= Marianelli =

Marianelli is an Italian surname. Notable people with the surname include:

- Alessandra Marianelli (born 1986), Italian opera singer
- Dario Marianelli (born 1963), Italian composer
