= Gianni di Parigi =

Opera by Gaetano Donizetti

- Opera by Gaetano Donizetti
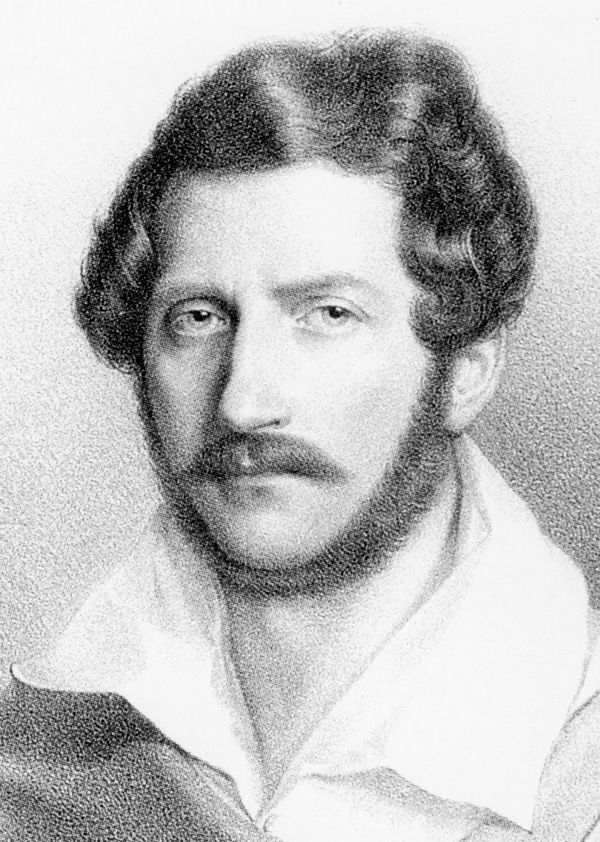
- Gaetano Donizetti c. 1835
- Librettist: Felice Romani
- Language: Italian
- Based on: François-Adrien Boieldieu's Jean de Paris
- Premiere: 10 September 1839; Teatro San Carlo, Naples

Gianni di Parigi is an 1839 melodramma comico (opera buffa) in two acts with music by Gaetano Donizetti to a libretto by Felice Romani, which had previously been set by Francesco Morlacchi in 1818 and by Giovanni Antonio Speranza in 1836.

It is derived from Jean de Paris, an 1812 opera by François-Adrien Boieldieu with a libretto by Claude Godard d'Aucourt de Saint-Just, which had been performed in Naples in 1816.

== Composition history ==
According to Charles Osborne, the research of Swedish musicologist Anders Wiklund suggests that Donizetti may have begun composing the music for the opera between 1828 and 1830 for a projected performance in Naples which did not occur. It is established with certainty that Donizetti completed the score in 1831, intending it as a vehicle for the popular tenor Giovanni Battista Rubini, who had created the role of Percy in Donizetti's Anna Bolena on 26 December 1830, and to whom Donizetti presented the completed score in 1831. Apparently Rubini did not seriously promote it with opera managements, but somehow it was acquired by Bartolomeo Merelli, who became impresario of La Scala in 1836 and despite the protests of Donizetti produced it there in 1839.

Jeremy Commons, however, points out that Wiklund discovered that in Donizetti's autograph score in the Naples Conservatorio di Musica San Pietro a Majella the overture is clearly dated 1828. Commons notes that the opera's style fits better with florid operas of the 1820s such as Gianni di Calais than with the more romantic 1830s operas such as L'elisir d'amore, and Wiklund suggests that Neapolitan elements in the opera indicate that it was composed in Naples where Donizetti was active in the 1820s. A further score of 1832, with some revisions by the composer (including the omission of the Neapolitan elements), is located in the Casa Ricordi archives in Milan. This may be the score which Donizetti presented to Rubini, who presumably passed it through the hands of Giovanni Ricordi to Merelli.

The sparkling overture includes a theme which is quite similar to that of Don Profondo's aria Medaglie Incomparabili from Il viaggio a Reims by Rossini.

== Performance history ==
The opera premiered on 10 September 1839 at the Teatro alla Scala in Milan, where it received twelve performances. There were seventeen further performances in 1845 at the Teatro Regio (Turin) and ten in 1846 at the Teatro San Carlo in Naples, but it was not staged subsequently until December 1985 in New York by the Vineyard Opera Shop, in a much reduced arrangement for piano, flute, clarinet and bassoon. It was revived by the Donizetti Festival in Bergamo in 1988 and 1991. A new production in 2010 at the Festival della Valle d'Itria at Martina Franca was revived by Wexford Festival Opera in October 2011.

== Roles ==
Roles, voice types, premiere cast
Role	Voice type	Premiere cast, 10 September 1839 (Conductor: – )
The Princess of Navarre	soprano	Antonietta Marini-Rainieri
Il Gran Siniscalco, her seneschal	bass	Ignazio Marini
Gianni di Parigi, the disguised Dauphin of France	tenor	Lorenzo Salvi
Pedrigo, an inn-keeper	bass	Agostino Rovere
Lorezza, his daughter	mezzo-soprano	Marietta Sacchi
Oliviero, Gianni's page	contralto	Felicita Baillou-Hillaret
Followers of the Princess and of Gianni, waiters

== Synopsis ==
Place: Provence
Time: 14th century

Pedrigo, an innkeeper from Provence, is preparing his inn for the arrival of the Princess of Navarre who ordered her lunch and lodging in advance, but before her arrival comes a rich citizen from Paris, Gianni, who pays him as twice as much and gets hold of the place. To everyone's surprise, when the princess arrives she accepts the situation with good humor – and that is because she recognizes Gianni as King Philip de Valois's son. Finally both princess and prince (after taking off his disguise) fall in love and are prepared to get married.

== Recordings ==
Year	Cast: Princess, Gran Siniscalco, Gianni, Pedrigo	Conductor, opera house and orchestra	Label
1988	Luciana Serra, Angelo Romero, Giuseppe Morino, Enrico Fissore	Carlo Cillario, Italian Radio Symphony Orchestra and Chorus (Recorded at performances at the Bergamo Festival, 18, 20, 22, 25 September)	CD: Nuovo Era; Cat: 6752-6753
2010	Ekaterina Lekhina, Roberto de Candia, Edgardo Rocha, Andrea Porta	Giacomo Sagripanti, orchestra and Slovakian Choir of Bratislava	DVD: Bongiovanni, Cat: AB 20025

== Scores ==
An autograph of the score is held at the Conservatorio di San Pietro a Majella in Naples. Since neither of the first two productions were supervised by Donizetti, it reflects changes made by other hands, which are evident from the differences in the two librettos and the presence of considerable non-autograph materials in the Naples score. There is also a score in the Ricordi Archives in Milan with significant autograph additions not found in the one in Naples.
