= Giuseppina Vitali =

Italian soprano, composer, and writer

Giuseppina Vitali Augusti (1 March 1845 – 15 February 1915) was an Italian soprano, composer, and writer.

Vitali was born in Odessa to Raphael V. and Claudia Ferlotti Vitali, who were both singers. They opened a singing school in Bologna where Vitali studied. She was also coached by her maternal uncle Raffaele Ferlotti, a singer who had performed at La Scala. Vitali married Italian tenor Augusto Paoletti (stage name Paolo Augusti) in 1871 and they had three daughters, Claudina, Ida, and Augusta. She appeared on stage as "Giuseppina Vitali-Augusti," and published her songs and poems as "Giuseppina Vitali."

Vitali made her debut as a singer at age 17 in the role of Gilda in a performance of Giuseppe Verdi's Rigoletto in Modena. She sang major roles on stages throughout Europe and also in Egypt. Vitali donated the proceeds for several performances in Prague to various charities (for the Association of St. Ludmilla, to pay construction expenses for Prague's National Theater, for the theater choir, and for the Academic Readers' Association).

In 1866, Gioachino Rossini rewrote the role of Ninetta in his opera The Thieving Magpie specifically for Vitali to sing. Vitali left the stage in 1894 when her work at Gran Teatre del Liceu in Barcelona was cancelled after a bomb exploded and the theater was closed for repairs. She retired to Rome to write poems and songs and teach. Soprano Elisa Petri was among her students. Vitali's music was published by Casa Ricordi. In addition to her own compositions, she translated at least one of Gaetano Donizetti's songs ("Il giglio e la rosa") from French to Italian.

Accademia d'arte Lirica Osimo instituted the Giuseppina Vitali Prize for opera singers in 2017. The prize was offered again in 2019.
