= Teatro Giuseppe Verdi =

Coordinates: 44°58′53″N 10°02′29″E

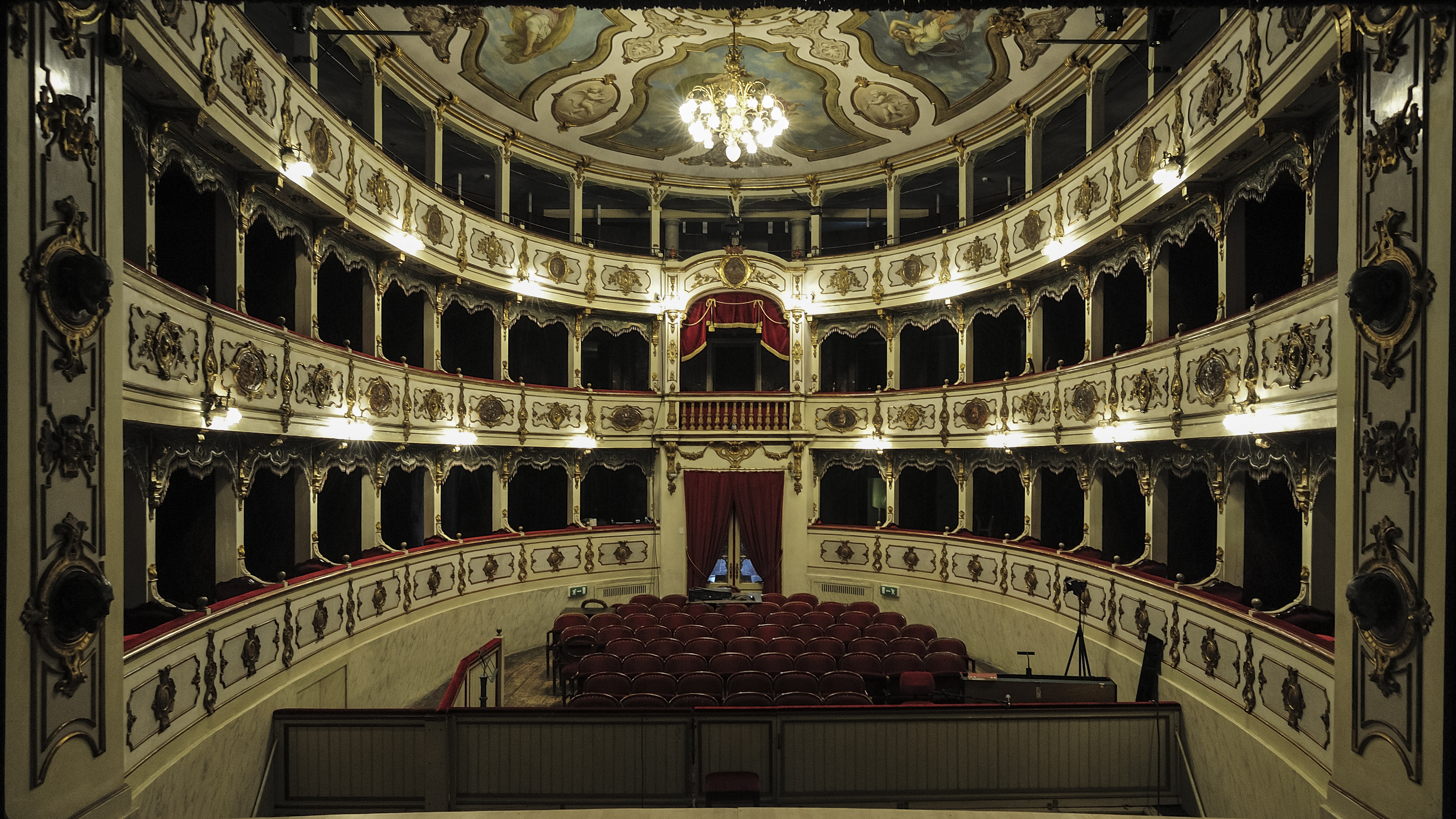
Teatro Verdi interior

Teatro Giuseppe Verdi (the Giuseppe Verdi Theatre) is a small opera house located in a wing of the Rocca dei Marchesi Pallavicino on the Piazza Giuseppe Verdi in Busseto, Italy, a town closely associated with the life of the opera composer, Giuseppe Verdi. From the 13th century, the “rocca” or “fortress” was the family's palace; it is now the city hall after being acquired by the municipality in 1856. The theatre opened on 15 August 1868 and seats 300.

Prior to 1856, a theatre existed in the same location, and while plans to build a new one were begun in 1845, nothing happened until the municipality took over. Designed by Pier Luigi Montecchini, the theatre is located on an upper level of the City Hall and is reached by a large staircase. Outside the theatre is a bust of Verdi by Giovanni Dupré. The interior is traditionally horseshoe-shaped with three rows of boxes and an elegantly designed ceiling featuring four medallions representing comedy, tragedy, melodrama, and romantic drama.

Although Verdi opposed its construction (it would be “too expensive and useless in the future”, he said) and is reputed never to have set foot in it, he did contribute 10,000 lire towards the construction and maintained his own box. On opening night, operagoers dressed in green (the color in Italian is verde), the men all wearing green cravats, the women wearing green dresses. Two of Verdi's operas were presented, Rigoletto and Un ballo in maschera. Verdi did not attend even though he lived only two miles away at his home, the Villa Verdi, in the village of Sant’Agata in Villanova sull'Arda.

In 1913, Arturo Toscanini conducted a performance of Falstaff in celebration of the centenary of Verdi's birth and to raise funds for what is now a large monument of the seated composer located in the piazza. In 2001 the theatre re-painted the sets from 1913 for a revival; these were used again in October 2013 for a Verdi bi-centenary performance of Falstaff.

The theatre was extensively renovated in the 1990s. It presents a regular season of opera performances.

== See also ==
- National Giuseppe Verdi Museum
- Villa Verdi
