= Marietta Sacchi =

Italian operatic soprano (fl. 1820–1830s)

- Occupation: Italian operatic soprano

Marietta Sacchi was an Italian operatic soprano who had an active career during the 1820s and 1830s.

She mainly performed in comprimario and soubrette roles, and appeared at most of Italy's major opera houses and at His Majesty's Theatre in London. She notably created roles in the world premieres of operas by Vincenzo Bellini, Gaetano Donizetti, Simon Mayr, Giovanni Pacini, Luigi Ricci, and Giuseppe Verdi. She also excelled in parts from the operas of Gioachino Rossini.

== Career ==
In 1823, Sacchi portrayed the role of Barsene in the world premiere of Simon Mayr's Demetrio at the Teatro Regio di Torino. In 1826 she sang in the premiere of Giovanni Pacini's La gelosia corretta at La Scala and returned to that house the following year to perform the role of Adele in the world premiere of Vincenzo Bellini's Il pirata. She was committed to the Teatro Regio di Torino in 1828-1829, where she performed Zarele in Pacini's Gli arabi nelle Gallie and Selene in Saverio Mercadante's Didone abbandonata. In May and June 1829 she performed in several operas at the Teatro Regio di Parma, including Azema in the house premiere of Gioachino Rossini's Semiramide, Berta in the house premiere of Rossini's The Barber of Seville, Fatima in the world premiere of Bellini's Zaira, and Sinaide in the house premiere of Rossini's Moïse et Pharaon. In August and September 1829 she performed at the Teatro Riccardi in Bergamo as Adra in Pietro Generali's Jefte and Zarele. In October–November 1829 she was heard at the Teatro Comunale di Bologna as Adele in Nicola Vaccai's Giulietta e Romeo, Adra, Azema, and Emilia in Rossini's Otello.

From December 1829 through February 1830, Sacchi performed in several operas at the Teatro Regio di Parma, including Vaccai's Adele, Roggiero in Rossini's Tancredi, and Zaida in Rossini's Il turco in Italia. The following April she made her debut at His Majesty's Theatre in London as Bellini's Adele. In 1831 she performed at La Scala as Clotilde in the world premiere of Bellini's Norma; a role she repeated the following year at La Fenice. In 1832 she was heard at the Teatro della Canobbiana as Giannetta in the premiere of Donizetti's L'elisir d'amore. She sang several roles at La Fenice in 1833, including Isaura in Tancredi and Giannetta. In 1834 she performed at the opera house in Livorno as Rossini's Berta, Elisetta in Domenico Cimarosa's Il matrimonio segreto, and Jemmy in Rossini's William Tell.

In 1836, Sacchi was committed to the Teatro Comunale di Bologna where she portrayed Eudora in Donizetti's Belisario and Imelda in Donizetti's Parisina among other roles. In 1837 she returned to the Teatro Regio di Parma to portray the role of Lisa in Bellini's La sonnambula opposite Joséphine de Méric as Amina. In 1838 she portrayed Countess Almaviva in the world premiere of Luigi Ricci's The Marriage of Figaro at La Scala. She was heard in Parma again in January 1839 as Anaide in Mosè in Egitto. Some of her last operatic appearances were at La Scala in 1839 in the world premieres of Donizetti's Gianni di Parigi (Lorezza) and Verdi's Oberto (Cuniza).
