= Adelia (opera) =

Opera by Gaetano Donizetti

- Opera by Gaetano Donizetti
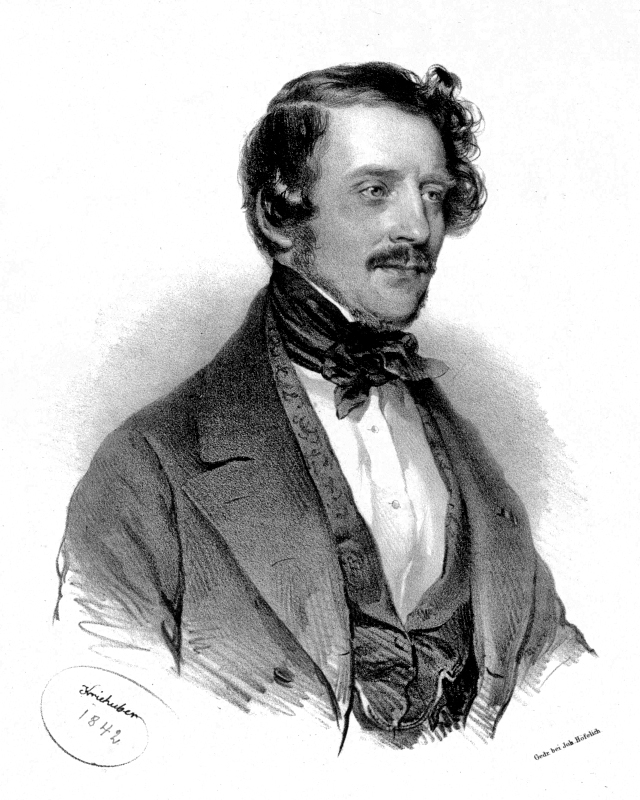
- Gaetano Donizetti, portrayed by Josef Kriehuber in 1842
- Other title: La figlia dell'arciere
- Librettist: Felice Romani; Girolamo Maria Marini
- Language: Italian
- Premiere: 11 February 1841; Teatro Apollo, Rome

Adelia, o La figlia dell'arciere (Adelia, or The Archer's Daughter) is an opera in three acts by Gaetano Donizetti. The Italian libretto was written partly by Felice Romani (acts 1 and 2) and by Girolamo Maria Marini (act 3), a part-time poet who had achieved notability the previous year with Otto Nicolai's Il templario. The opera premiered at the Teatro Apollo, Rome on 11 February 1841.

== Roles ==
Roles, voice types, premiere cast
Role	Voice type	Premiere cast, 11 February 1841 Conductor: Emilio Angelini
Carlo, Duke of Burgundy	baritone	Filippo Valentini
Oliviero, Count of Fienna	tenor	Lorenzo Salvi
Arnoldo, commander of the French archers in the service of the Duke	bass	Ignazio Marini
Adelia, his daughter	soprano	Giuseppina Strepponi
Comino, the Duke's chamberlain	tenor	Pietro Gasperini
Odetta, Adelia's friend	mezzo-soprano	Clementina Baroni
A squire of Oliviero	bass	Luigi Fossi

== Synopsis ==
Time: "The past"
Place: Burgundy

The story features the protagonist, Adelia, the daughter of Arnoldo, one of Duke Carlo's bodyguards. The Duke returns from a successful battle to find a fellow nobleman, Count Oliviero, leaving Arnoldo's house which is on Carlo's estate. The chorus then sing rumors that Oliviero has slept with Adelia, taking her virginity. The Duke sentences Oliviero to death for this perceived transgression, but the other characters prevent this. By the end of the opera, all agree to the marriage.

== Notable arias and numbers ==
Act 1

- Arnoldo: "Siam giunti"
- Adelia: "Fui presaga; ah, tu lo vedi"

Act 2

- Duet: Adelia and Arnoldo: "Ah, no, non posso"
- Duet: Adelia and Oliviero: "Tutto di te sollecito"

Act 3

- Oliviero: "Che fia di me!"
- Adelia: "Ah! mi lasciate"

== Recordings ==
Year	Cast: Carlo, Oliviero, Arnoldo, Adelia	Conductor, Opera house and orchestra	Label
1998	Stefano Antonucci, Octavio Arévalo, Boris Martinovic, Mariella Devia	John Neschling; Teatro Carlo Felice, Genoa Orchestra and Chorus (Recorded at performances in the Teatro Carlo Felice, January/ February)	CD: BMG Ricordi(Agorá); Cat: RFCD 2029
2006	Giulio Mastronataro, David Sotgiu, Andrea Silvestrelli, Michela Sburlati	Gustav Kuhn; Haydn Orchestra of Bozen and Trient and the Haydn Choir (Recorded at concert performances in the Bolzano Auditorium, Bolzano, 11–16 December)	CD: RCA Red Seal; Cat: 88697 10813 2
