= Marco Frusoni =

Italian operatic tenor

Marco Frusoni (born September 19, 1977, in Rome) is an Italian operatic tenor.

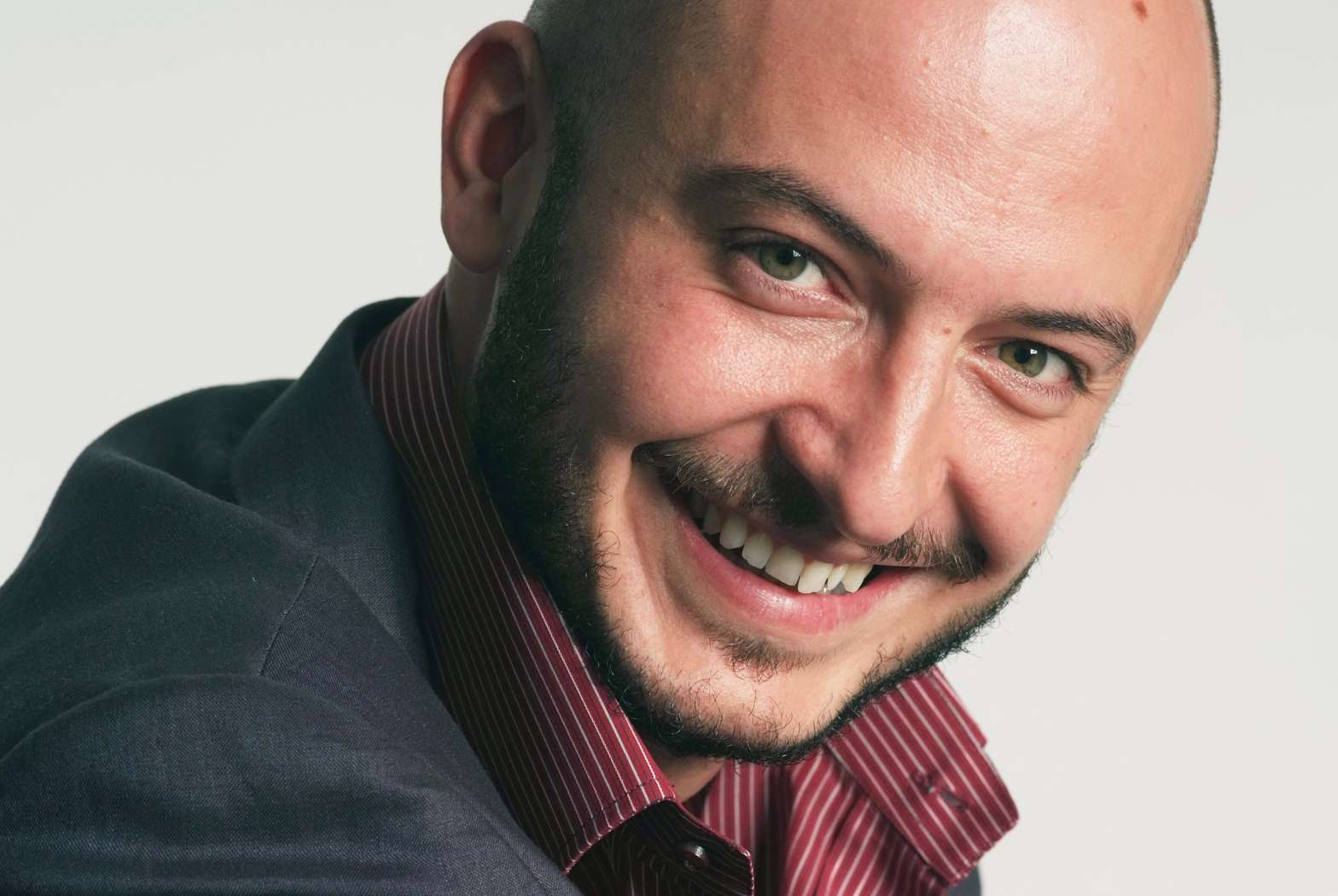
Il tenore Marco Frusoni

== Early life ==
Frusoni was born in Rome, and raised in Florence. His father was the tenor Maurizio Frusoni. He began studying contemporary piano and electric bass, and also graduated in modern literature at Sapienza University of Rome. Frusoni's passion for opera arrived late, despite attending several opera productions around the world with his father. At the age of 18 he made his opera debut as a mime.

== Early studies ==
Frusoni attended several masterclasses, at the Accademia Musicale Chigiana of Siena and Ateneo Lirico of Sulmona, studying with Renato Bruson, Raina Kabaivanska, Giorgio Merighi, Marcello Giordani, Alberto Gazale and Fernando Cordeiro Opa.

== Debut as an operatic tenor ==
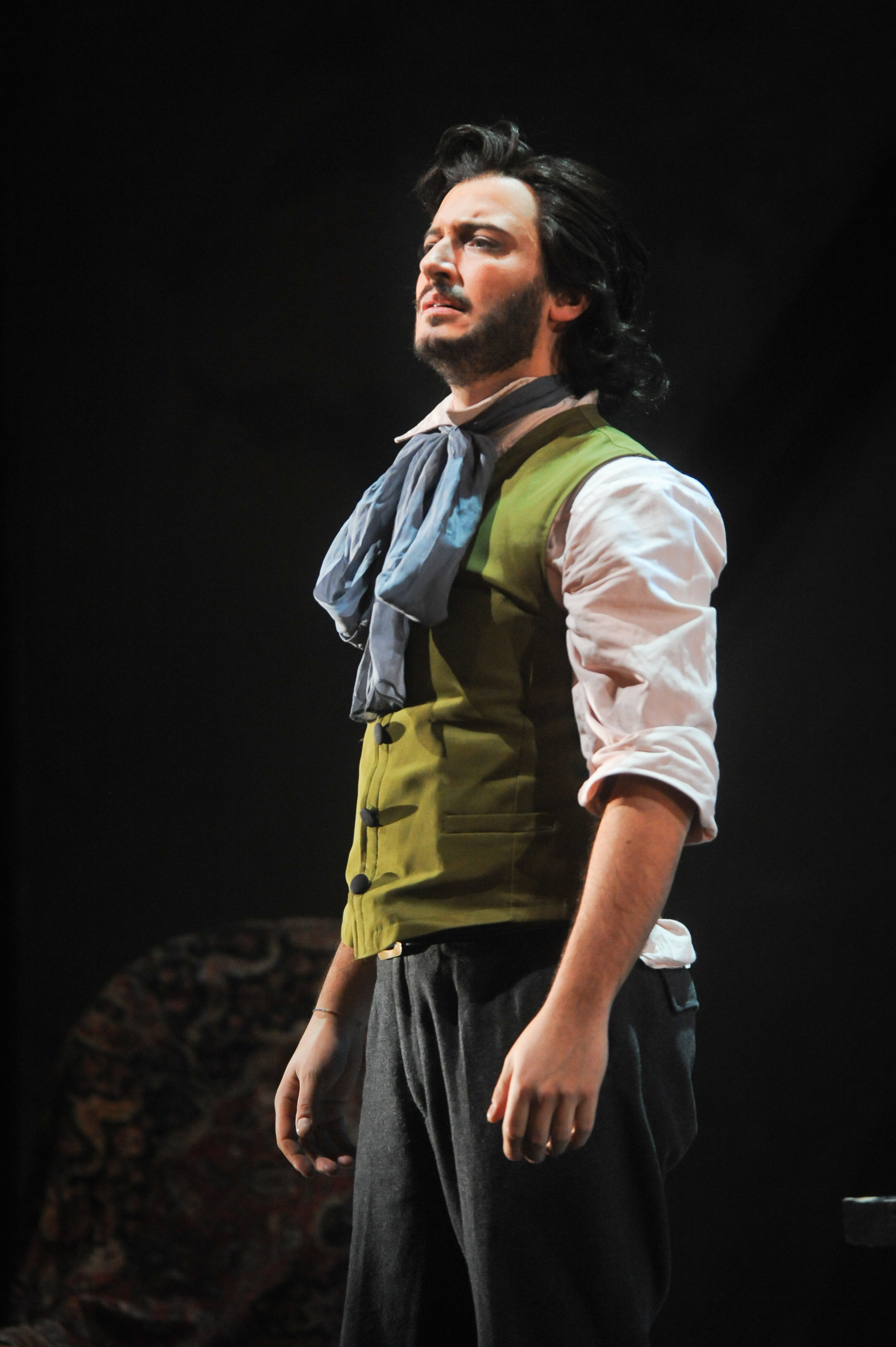
Marco Frusoni nei panni di Rodolfo (La Bohème di G. Puccini)

In March 2008, he made his debut as an operatic tenor at the Teatro dell’Opera di Roma in La camerata Bardi. He then sang both in Italy and abroad in operas such as: Der Rosenkavalier by R. Strauss, Otello by G. Verdi, Falstaff by G. Verdi, Elisir d’amore and Anna Bolena by G. Donizetti, Gianni Schicchi and La Bohème by G. Puccini, The Greek Passion (opera) by L. Martinu, Una notte a Venezia by J. Strauss, The Merry Widow, Rigoletto by G. Verdi, Carmen by G. Bizet, La Traviata by G. Verdi, Tosca of G. Puccini, Un giorno di regno by G. Verdi, Messa di Requiem by G. Verdi, Messa di Requiem by W. A. Mozart and Turandot by G. Puccini.
