= Agostino Rovere =

Italian opera singer

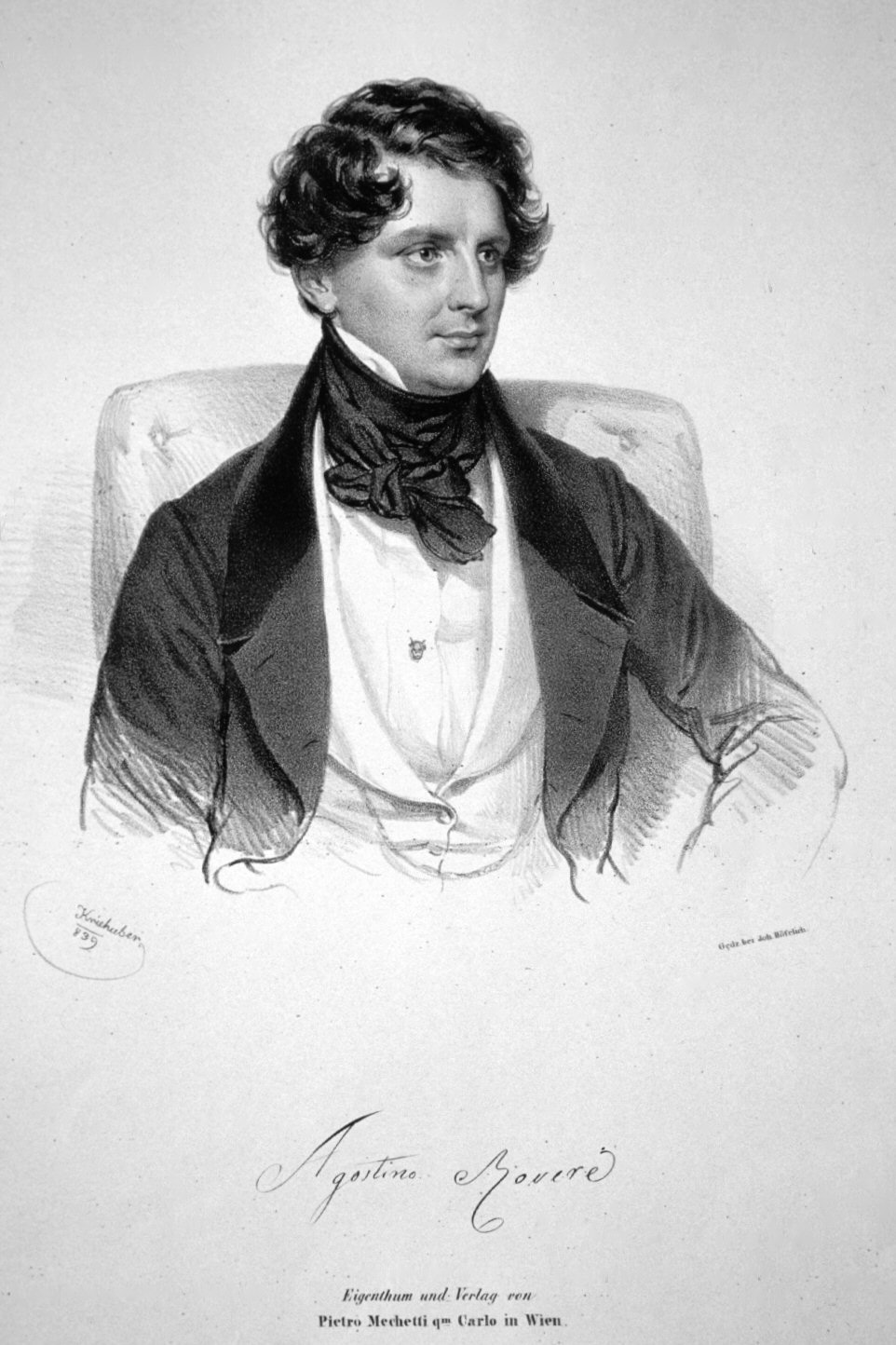
- Lithograph by Josef Kriehuber, 1839
- Born: 1804; Monza, Italy
- Died: 10 December 1865 (aged 60–61); New York City, US
- Occupation: Operatic

Agostino Rovere (1804, Monza – 1865, New York City) was an Italian operatic bass.

== Career ==
After studying singing in Milan, he made his professional opera debut in 1826 at the opera house in Pavia. In 1828 he portrayed Clemente in the world premiere of Vincenzo Bellini's Bianca e Fernando at the Teatro Carlo Felice in Genoa. In 1839 he sang the role of Pedrigo in the world premiere of Gaetano Donizetti's Gianni di Parigi at La Scala. He returned to that opera house the following year to create the role of La Rocca in the world premiere of Giuseppe Verdi's Un giorno di regno. In 1842, he portrayed the role of Marquis de Boisfleury in the world premiere of Donizetti's Linda di Chamounix at the Kärntnertortheater in Vienna. In 1847–1848, he was committed to the Royal Opera House in London where he sang Bartolo in Wolfgang Amadeus Mozart's The Marriage of Figaro, Don Magnifico in Rossini's La Cenerentola, Dulcamara in Donizetti's L'elisir d'amore, Leporello in Don Giovanni, and Mustafà in Gioachino Rossini's L'italiana in Algeri
