= Mariella Devia =

Italian operatic soprano (born 1948)

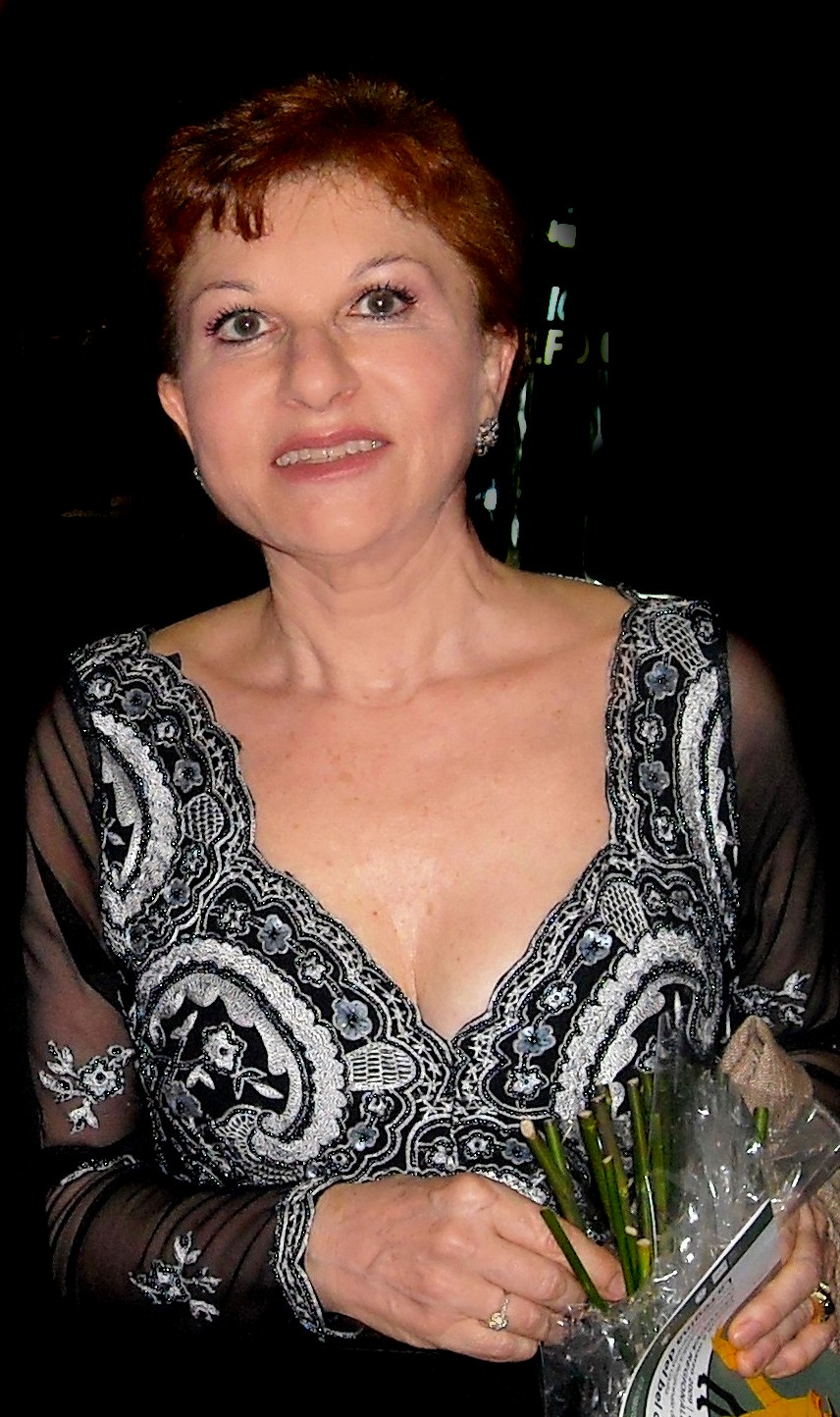
- Born: April 12, 1948 (age 78); Chiusavecchia, Italy
- Education: Milan Conservatory; Santa Cecilia Conservatory
- Occupation: Operatic soprano
- Years active: 1973 – present

Mariella Devia (born 12 April 1948) is an Italian operatic soprano. After beginning her career as a lyric coloratura soprano, in the finale part of it she also enjoyed considerable success with some of the most dramatic roles in the bel canto repertoire.

== Biography ==
Born in Chiusavecchia, Devia began her studies at the Milan Conservatory with Iolanda Magnoni, but she later followed her teacher to the Santa Cecilia Conservatory in Rome where she graduated. She made her stage debut at the Teatro Comunale in Treviso in the title role of Lucia di Lammermoor in 1973 and quickly sang throughout Italy, making her debut at La Scala in Milan in 1987, as Giulietta in I Capuleti e i Montecchi.

On the international scene, she appeared at the Metropolitan Opera from 1979 to 1994 as Lucia, Gilda, Nannetta, Despina and Konstanze, and at Carnegie Hall as Lakmé, in 1979, and later as Teresa in Benvenuto Cellini, Giulietta, Elvira in I puritani and Adelia. She made her debut at the Paris Opera (I puritani - Salle Favart) and the Aix-en-Provence Festival (as Konstanze) in 1987, and at the Royal Opera House in London in 1988 (again as Konstanze).

She was a regular at the Pesaro Festival and at the Festival della Valle d'Itria in Martina Franca, where she collaborated in the resurrection of long neglected operas by Rossini, Donizetti, Bellini and other bel canto composers. She is also admired for her Mozart performances in Die Entführung aus dem Serail, The Magic Flute, Così fan tutte, Le nozze di Figaro, Don Giovanni and Idomeneo.

In 2013, the day after her 65th birthday, she sang for the first time the role of Norma at the Teatro Comunale di Bologna with great success. From then on she included the role of Norma in her usual repertoire along with the "Three Donizetti Queens", Maria Stuarda, Anna Bolena and Elisabetta from Roberto Devereux, which she had debuted between 2006 and 2011, and with Lucrezia Borgia, first performed in 2001.

On 5 June 2014, after a 15-year absence from the United States, she returned for a performance of Roberto Devereux at New York's Carnegie Hall with the Opera Orchestra of New York to great audience and critical acclaim.

Devia bid farewell to the opera stage in May 2018 with three performances of Norma at the Teatro La Fenice in Venice, where she was also awarded the 'Premio Una vita nella musica 2018', so joining "such prestigious figures as Daniel Barenboim, Ruggero Raimondi, Gianandrea Gavazzeni, Karl Böhm, Carlo Maria Giulini, Yehudi Menuhin, Mstislav Rostropovich, and Carlo Bergonzi, among others to have received the prestigious award". Thenceforth she has only dedicated her career to singing concerts and teaching.

== Repertory ==
- Auber: Manon Lescaut – Manon
- Bellini: Beatrice di Tenda – Beatrice; I Capuleti e i Montecchi – Giulietta; Il pirata – Imogene; I puritani – Elvira; La sonnambula – Amina; Norma – Norma
- Berlioz: Benvenuto Cellini – Teresa
- Bizet: Carmen - Micaela; Les pêcheurs de perles – Leila
- Cherubini: L'hôtellerie portugaise - Gabriella; Lodoïska – Lodoïska
- Cimarosa: Il matrimonio segreto – Elisabetta
- Donizetti: Adelia – Adelia; Anna Bolena – Anna; Don Pasquale – Norina; Il castello di Kenilworth – Elisabetta; L'elisir d'amore – Adina; La fille du régiment – Marie; Linda di Chamounix – Linda; Lucrezia Borgia – Lucrezia; Lucia di Lammermoor – Lucia; Maria Stuarda – Maria; Marino Faliero – Elena; Parisina – Parisina; Roberto Devereux – Elisabetta
- Duni: La fée Urgèle - The fairy/Marton
- Delibes: Lakmé – Lakmé
- Gluck: Orfeo ed Euridice - Euridice
- Gounod: Faust – Marguerite; Roméo et Juliette – Juliette
- Mozart: Così fan tutte – Despina and Fiordiligi; Die Entführung aus dem Serail – Konstanze; Don Giovanni – Donna Anna; Idomeneo – Ilia and Elettra; The Marriage of Figaro – Contessa; The Magic Flute – Pamina and Queen of the Night
- Offenbach: Les contes d'Hoffmann - Antonia
- Pergolesi: Adriano in Siria - Farnaspe (breeches role)
- Petrassi: Il cordovano - Cristina
- Puccini: Gianni Schicchi – Lauretta; Turandot – Liù
- Rossini: Adelaide di Borgogna – Adelaide; The Barber of Seville – Rosina; Le comte Ory – Adèle; Mosè in Egitto – Elcia; Otello – Desdemona; Semiramide – Semiramide; Il signor Bruschino – Sofia; Tancredi – Amenaide; Il turco in Italia – Fiorilla; Zelmira – Zelmira; La donna del lago - Elena;
- Rota: Il cappello di paglia di Firenze – Elena; Napoli milionaria - Maria Rosaria
- Satie: Geneviève de Brabant – Geneviève
- Spontini: Milton - Emma
- Stravinsky: Mavra - Parasha; Le rossignol - The nightingale
- Verdi: Falstaff – Nannetta; Giovanna d'Arco – Giovanna; Rigoletto – Gilda; La traviata – Violetta; Un ballo in maschera - Oscar (breeches role)
