= National Giuseppe Verdi Museum =

- Museo nazionale Giuseppe Verdi
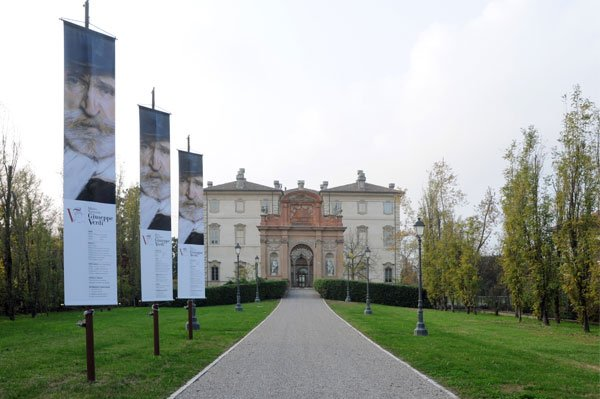
- Established: 10 October 2009; 16 years ago
- Location: Busseto, Parma, Italy
- Coordinates: 44.9778°N 10.0370°E
- Type: Biographical museum, music museum
- Website: www.museogiuseppeverdi.org

The National Giuseppe Verdi Museum (Italian: Museo nazionale Giuseppe Verdi) is a music museum in Busseto, Province of Parma, Italy. It is dedicated to Giuseppe Verdi and is housed at the Renaissance Villa Pallavicino.

The museum was inaugurated on 10 October 2009 on the 196th anniversary of Verdi's birth in Busseto. The museum follows the historical path of the works of Verdi and has arranged 27 exhibition spaces based on the 27 works of the composer.

== See also ==
- Teatro Giuseppe Verdi
- Villa Verdi
