= Un giorno di regno =

Opera by Giuseppe Verdi

- Melodramma giocoso by Giuseppe Verdi
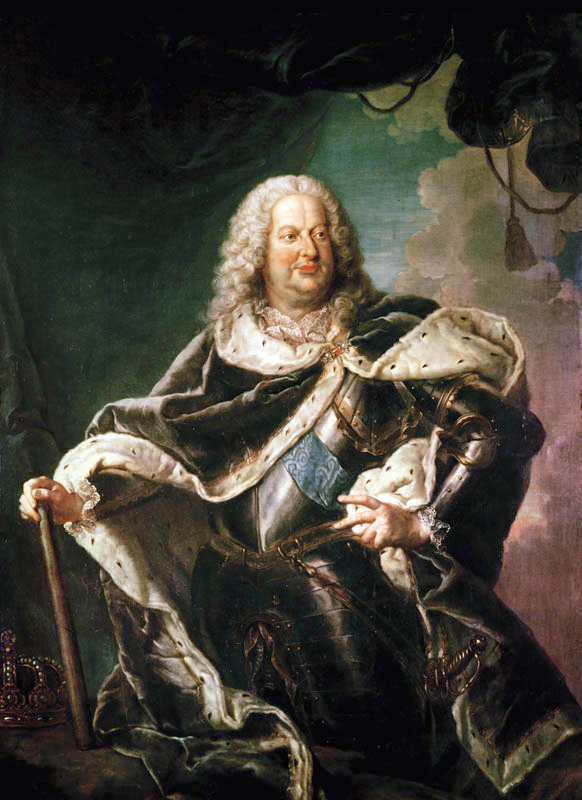
- King Stanislaus I of Poland who is impersonated by the opera's protagonist
- Other title: Il finto Stanislao
- Librettist: Felice Romani
- Language: Italian
- Based on: Alexandre-Vincent Pineux Duval's play, Le faux Stanislas
- Premiere: 5 September 1840; Teatro alla Scala, Milan

Un giorno di regno, ossia Il finto Stanislao (A One-Day Reign, or The Pretend Stanislaus, but often translated into English as King for a Day) is an operatic melodramma giocoso in two acts by Giuseppe Verdi to an Italian libretto written in 1818 by Felice Romani. Originally written for the Bohemian composer Adalbert Gyrowetz the libretto was based on the play Le faux Stanislas written by the Frenchman Alexandre-Vincent Pineux Duval in 1808. Un giorno was given its premiere performance at the Teatro alla Scala, Milan on 5 September 1840.

After the success of his first opera, Oberto in 1839, Verdi received a commission from La Scala impresario Merelli to write three more operas. Un giorno was first of the three, but he wrote the piece during a period when first his children and then his wife died and its failure in 1840 caused the young composer to almost abandon opera. It was not until he was enticed to write the music for the existing libretto of what became Nabucco that Verdi restarted his career.

== Composition history ==
After Oberto and after Merelli returned from Vienna in early 1840, he needed a comedy to be written for the autumn season. Asked to select a libretto by Romani which already existed, Verdi notes that he did not like any of them but "because the matter was of some urgency, I chose the one which seemed to me to be the least bad".

== Performance history ==
=== Premiere and other 19th century performances ===
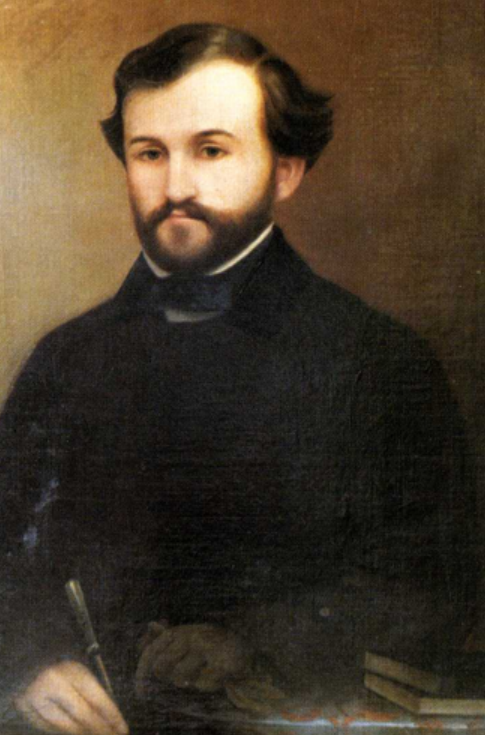
Portrait of Verdi, 1839–40 by Molentini

The first performance at La Scala on 5 September 1840 was a failure, and La Scala cancelled the remaining scheduled performances. They did not revive the work until 2001. Verdi would not attempt another operatic comedy until the end of his career with Falstaff.

At the premiere Verdi was seated in the orchestra pit, and thus heard the audience reaction directly. Along with the critics, Verdi acknowledged that the failure was partly due to his own personal circumstances, since his two children and his wife Margherita Barezzi had died, in 1838, 1839, and 1840 respectively, all during the period leading up to and during its composition. A contributing factor was that the only singers La Scala's impresario had available were those assembled for an opera seria, Otto Nicolai's Il templario, and they had no experience with comedy: "The cast had been assembled chiefly for the performance of the season's most successful novelty, Il templario, Nicolai's version of Ivanhoe". Other factors which have been noted include the large size of La Scala itself (noted by George Martin as "too big for the piece") plus the rather old-fashioned nature of the work which was written in a style that was rapidly going out of fashion. In fact, in summary, Budden notes that "by the side of Donizetti's L'elisir d'amore or Don Pasquale, it cuts a clumsy figure".

Other productions in Italy during Verdi's lifetime seemed to fare better; it was given in Venice in 1845 (as Il finto Stanislao, where it did well), in Rome in 1846, and Naples (also as Il finto Stanislao) in 1859.

=== 20th century and beyond ===
In the U.S., the opera received its premiere on 18 June 1960 by Amato Opera, in English at New York Town Hall. In the UK, the premiere took place on 21 March 1961 in Italian by the Impressario Society at St Pancras Town Hall conducted by Hans Ucko.

It was part of the San Diego Opera's June 1981 "Verdi Festival".

With the temporary shutdown of the Royal Opera House, Covent Garden in 1999, the Royal Opera gave a concert performance at the Royal Festival Hall. Russian baritone Vladimir Chernov sang the "King" with John Del Carlo as Baron Kelbar; Susanne Mentzer sang Giuletta. This presentation was followed in 2001 with a staged production at the Buxton Festival in England.

In October 2012, the Bilbao-based ABAO society, one which plans to present all of Verdi's works, presented the opera under conductor Alberto Zedda.

Sarasota Opera presented the new critical edition of the opera in March 2013, the 29th work of the complete Verdi canon (in all its versions) to be presented by the company. Dr. Francesco Izzo, Co-Director of the American Institute for Verdi Studies and the critical edition's editor, notes that:

This edition corrects a number of inaccuracies and arbitrary alterations present in other scores of the opera, which has often circulated under the title Il finto Stanislao. I have done my very best to provide an edition that faithfully reflects Verdi's intentions throughout.

The Glimmerglass Festival presented the opera in a new English adaptation during the 2013 Festival.

== Roles ==
Role	Voice type	Premiere cast, 5 September 1840 (Conductor: Eugenio Cavallini)
Cavaliere di Belfiore, a French officer impersonating Stanislao of Poland	baritone	Raffaele Ferlotti
Barone di Kelbar, the usurper	bass	Raffaele Scalese
The Marchesa del Poggio, a young widow, the Baron's niece, in love with Belfiore	soprano	Antonietta Marini-Rainieri
Giulietta di Kelbar, the Baron's daughter	mezzo-soprano	Luigia Abbadia
Edoardo di Sanval, a young official, la Rocca's nephew	tenor	Lorenzo Salvi
La Rocca, Treasurer to the Estates of Brittany	bass	Agostino Rovere
Count Ivrea, Commandant of Brest, engaged to the Marchesa	tenor	Giuseppe Vaschetti
Delmonte, esquire to the false Stanislao	tenor	Napoleone Marconi
Servants, chambermaids, vassals of the Baron

== Synopsis ==
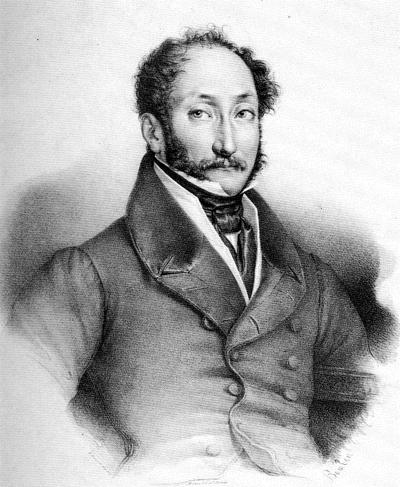
Felice Romani, librettist of the opera

The Polish monarch, King Stanisław Leszczyński, a historical figure during the War of Succession, lost his throne after the Saxon invasion at the Battle of Poltava in 1709. He regained it in 1733, but was again deposed in 1736 and went into exile in France. The opera is set in 1733 when Stanislaw returned to Poland leaving a French officer, the Cavaliere di Belfiore, to impersonate him in France.

Time: 1733
Place: Baron Kelbar's castle near Brest, France

=== Act 1 ===
Scene 1: A gallery in the home of Baron Kelbar

Belfiore, impersonating the Polish king Stanislaus, is a guest at the home of Baron Kelbar and he comments to himself on his change of fortune: "Compagnoni di Parigi...Verrà purtroppo il giorno" / "Comrades in Paris...Unfortunately, the day will come". The Baron has recently arranged a political alliance by betrothing his daughter, Giulietta, to La Rocca, the Brittany Treasurer, but Giulietta prefers La Rocca's nephew, Edoardo. Another undesired marriage involves Baron Kelbar's niece, the Marchesa del Poggio, a young widow who is in love with Belfiore. She has become engaged to the Count of Ivrea because Belfiore has been unable to commit himself to marrying her, in spite of the fact that he does love her.

Knowing of the Marchesa's imminent arrival and concerned that she might reveal his false identity as the King, Belfiore writes to Stanislaw and asks to be released from his commitment. Edoardo reveals his predicament to the "King" and begs to be taken to Poland with him in order to forget about the woman he loves. In addition, when the Marchesa arrives and, upon being introduced to Belfiore as "the King", she pretends not to recognize him. Likewise, he pretends not to recognize her, but she is determined to test him by proclaiming her love for the Count: "Grave a core innamorato...Se dee cader la vedova".

Scene 2: The Garden of Kelbar's castle

Giulietta is alone with her attendants and expresses unhappiness in having to marry an old man: "Non san quant'io nel petto...Non vo' quel vecchio". When Baron Kelbar and Treasurer La Rocca arrive, followed in succession by Belfiore and Edoardo and then the Marchesa (who was planning to help the lovers), Belfiore draws the Baron and Treasurer La Rocca away on the pretext of discussing state business, leaving the young lovers alone with the Marchesa.

Scene 3: The gallery of Kelbar's castle

Maintaining his role as the King, Belfiore makes the Treasurer an offer of advancement which would include marriage to a rich widow. By accepting, he agrees not to marry Giulietta. When the Treasurer tells Baron Kelbar that he refuses to marry his daughter, the Baron is affronted and challenges him to a duel. To add to the confusion all around, the Marchesa immediately proposes that Giulietta and Edoardo be married immediately. However, the false King returns and proposes that he will decide on a solution that will satisfy everyone.

=== Act 2 ===
Scene 1: The gallery of Kelbar's castle

Following the "King's" pronouncement, the servants are mystified and they sing a carefree chorus which leads to Edoardo seeking their support and announcing his hope of still being able to marry Giulietta: "Pietoso al lungo pianto...Deh lasciate a un alma amante".

Belfiore, the Treasurer, and Giulietta enter discussing the reasons for Baron Kelbar's opposition to his daughter's marriage to Eduardo. Giulietta explains that the young man's poverty is the main objection and so Belfiore immediately rules that the Treasurer must give up one of his castles and give over a sum of money to the young man, and then all will be well. The latter is somewhat reluctant to disobey his sovereign, but seeks a way out of his duel with Baron Kelbar.

Scene 2: A veranda overlooking the castle gardens

Belfiore and the Marchesa meet on the veranda, the former still unable to reveal who he really is. This incenses the lady, who boldly states that it is her intention to marry the Count of Ivrea. However, she cannot understand why Belfiore is taking so long to reveal himself and still hopes for his change of heart: (andante) "Si mostri a chi l'adora...". When Count Ivrea is announced, she takes a defiant stand (cabaletta): "Si, scordar saprò l'infido". Since Eduardo has pledged to join the "King" when he goes to Poland, Giulietta is determined to get the King to rescind the commitment. The Count enters and the Marchesa once again states that she will marry the Count. However, Belfiore immediately forbids the marriage for 'reasons of state' and announces that he and the Count must leave for Poland to deal with state business.

All express their feelings, but things come to a halt when a letter arrives for Belfiore. It is from King Stanislaw announcing his safe arrival in Warsaw and releasing Belfiore from his task of impersonating him. In return, the King has created him Marshal. Before dropping the disguise, the "King" proclaims that Giulietta and Eduardo are to be married and, having received Baron Kelbar's consent, reads the true king's letter and reveals his true rank. He expresses his love for the Marchesa and all ends happily with the prospect of two weddings.

== Music ==
The music of the piece shows the influence of Rossini and Donizetti. The haste in which the work was written may account for some of the uneven quality some critics have noted. With regard to the recitatives, Gossett notes that "only his youthful comic opera, Un giorno di regno (1840), uses secco recitative".

A critic at the UK premiere found a "soprano solo with female chorus of a kind that looks back to 'O beau pays de Touraine' in Les Huguenots" and "forward to Maria Boccanegra's 'Come in quest" ora bruna'"; he also sensed an "extraordinary foretaste of Falstaff in the servants' chorus which opens Act 2", and the "finale of the first act has already suggested a vein that Verdi was to exploit in Un Ballo in Maschera", while "in Act 2, Scene 2, the duet for Belfiore and the Marchesa, 'Si mostri a chi l'adora', has an orchestral introduction of an astonishingly chromatic nature".

== Recordings ==
Year	Cast (Belfiore, Kelbar, Marchesa, Giulietta, Edoardo)	Conductor, orchestra and chorus	Label
1951	Renato Capecchi, Sesto Bruscantini, Lina Pagliughi, Laura Cozzi, Juan Oncina	Alfredo Simonetto, Orchestra Lirica e Coro della RAI Milano	CD: Warner-Fonit; Cat: 8573-82664-2
1973	Ingvar Wixell, Wladimiro Ganzarolli, Fiorenza Cossotto, Jessye Norman, José Carreras	Lamberto Gardelli, Royal Philharmonic Orchestra and the Ambrosian Singers	CD: Philips; Cat: 422429
2010	Guido Loconsolo, Andrea Porta, Anna Caterina Antonacci, Alessandra Marianelli, Ivan Magri, Paolo Bordogna	Donato Renzetti, Orchestra and Chorus of the Teatro Regio di Parma, (Recording of a performance on 31 January)	DVD (Blu-ray, PAL): Unitel Classica; Cat: 720304
2013	Mikheil Kiria, Simone Alberti, Alice Quintavalla, Angela Nisi, Marco Frusoni	Gabriele Bonolis, Roma Sinfonietta and Belcanto Chorus, (Recording of performances in November at the Teatro Flavio Vespasiano, Rieti)	CD: Tactus; Cat: TC812290
