= Maria, regina d'Inghilterra =

Italian opera by Giovanni Pacini

- Opera by Giovanni Pacini
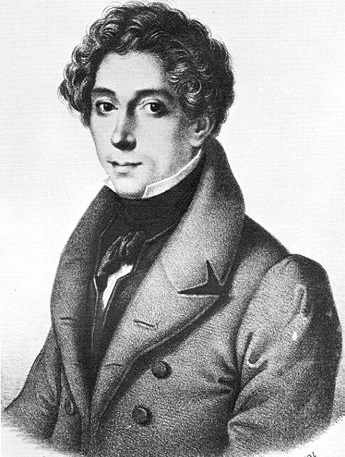
- Pacini
- Librettist: Leopoldo Tarantini
- Language: Italian
- Based on: Marie Tudor by Victor Hugo
- Premiere: 11 February 1843; Teatro Carolino, Palermo

Maria, regina d'Inghilterra (Mary Tudor, Queen of England) is an Italian opera in three acts, composed by Giovanni Pacini from a libretto by Leopoldo Tarantini, which was based on the 1833 play Marie Tudor by Victor Hugo. It was given its first performance at the Teatro Carolino, in Palermo, on 11 February 1843.

== Performance history ==
The opera was greeted with considerable acclaim at its creation. After a decade or so, it lost its popularity and disappeared from the stage until its revival by Opera Rara at the Bloomsbury Theatre in London as part of the Camden Festival on 23 March 1983.

Between March and May 2012, the opera was performed at the City Theater of Giessen in Germany.

Odyssey Opera mounted a fully staged production on 1 and 3 November 2019 at the Huntington Theater in Boston.

== Roles ==
Role	Voice type	Premiere Cast (Conductor: -)
Maria, Queen of England	soprano	Antonietta Marini-Rainieri
Riccardo Fenimoore	tenor	Nicola Ivanoff
Clotilde Talbot	soprano	Teresa Merli-Clerici
Ernesto Malcolm	baritone	Antonio Superchi
Gualtiero Churchill	bass	Antonio Benciolini

== Synopsis ==
Place: London
Time: 1553.

Mary I of England is infatuated with the Scottish adventurer Riccardo Fenimoore, whom she has ennobled as Lord Talbot, but he is unfaithful to her having seduced the foundling Clotilde, who is the only surviving child of the late Earl of Talbot. She has been raised and is now betrothed to the adoring Ernesto Malcolm, a commoner. Gualtiero Churchill, the Lord Chancellor, wants to protect the Queen by bringing Riccardo down, so he tells the Queen of Talbot's duplicity, and also reveals his knowledge that Clotilde is actually heir to the Talbot name. The Queen condemns Fenimoore to death but repents and orders Clotilde to help release him. However, to the dismay of the Queen, Churchill sees to it that the execution is carried out.

== Recordings ==
Year	Cast: (Mary, Riccardo, Clotilde, Ernesto)	Conductor, Opera House and Orchestra	Label
1996	Nelly Miricioiu, Bruce Ford, Mary Plazas, José Fardilha	David Parry, Philharmonia Orchestra and the Geoffrey Mitchell Choir	Audio CD: Opera Rara; ORC15
