= Antonietta Marini-Rainieri =

Italian operatic soprano

Antonietta Marini-Rainieri (c. 1815, Milan – 1870, Naples) was an Italian operatic soprano active during the first half of the 19th century. She was married to lauded operatic bass Ignazio Marini and often appeared on stage with him. In 1835 she portrayed Giulietta opposite Amalia Schütz Oldosi as Romeo in the Teatro Regio di Parma's first staging of Vincenzo Bellini's I Capuleti e i Montecchi. At La Scala she portrayed roles in the world premieres of Giuseppe Verdi's first two operas: Leonora in Oberto (1839) and the Marchesa del Poggio in Un giorno di regno (1840). She also appeared at that house as the Princess of Navarra in the premiere of Gaetano Donizetti's Gianni di Parigi (1839). In 1843, she sang the title role in the premiere of Giovanni Pacini's Maria, regina d'Inghilterra at the Teatro Carolino in Palermo. She reprised that role in December 1843 at La Scala, and at the Teatro Carlo Felice in February 1844.
