= Alessandra Marianelli =

Italian soprano (born 1986)

Alessandra Marianelli (born 1986) is an Italian soprano. She made her professional debut in 2002 as Barbarina in Le nozze di Figaro and went on to sing leading roles in the opera houses of her native country and internationally. Her recordings include Amour in Orphée et Eurydice for Decca Records and Fiorilla in Il turco in Italia for Naxos Records. She also appeared in Carlos Saura's 2009 film Io, Don Giovanni.

== Life and career ==
Marianelli was born in Pontedera in the Province of Pisa. She began her vocal studies in Pisa with Marina Billieri and Pieralba Soroga, with further study at the Conservatorio Mascagni in Livorno. In 2001, at the age of 15 and never having seen a live opera performance, she placed second in the Cascinalirica singing competition in Livorno. The following year she made her professional debut as Barbarina in Le nozze di Figaro at Pisa's Teatro Verdi. She won the Premio Spiros Argiris in 2004 and in December of that year appeared in the small off-stage role of "La voce dal cielo" (voice from heaven) in Don Carlo at the Teatro Comunale di Firenze. She would return there seven years later as Musetta in La bohème.

From 2004 onwards, Marinelli made a series of other house and role debuts in Italy, Belgium, Peru, Spain, and Monaco and sang over 30 different roles. These included Serpina in La serva padrona and Collette in Le devin du village at the Festival Pergolesi Spontini (2004); Nanetta in Falstaff at La Monnaie, Brussels (2006); Fiorilla in Il turco in Italia at the Rossini Opera Festival (2007); Gilda in Rigoletto at the Teatro Municipal Alejandro Granda, Lima; Amour in Orphée et Eurydice at the Teatro Real, Madrid (2008); Kseniya in Boris Godunov at the Teatro Regio di Torino (2010); Micaëla in Carmen at the Teatro Comunale di Bologna (2010); Oscar in Un ballo in maschera at the Opéra de Monte-Carlo (2011); and Giulietta in Un giorno di regno at the Teatro Regio di Parma (2013).

== Recordings ==
Composer	Title	Role	Medium	Year	Source	Label
Gluck	Orphée et Eurydice	Amour	CD	2008		Decca Records
Mussorgsky	Boris Godunov	Ksenija	DVD	2011		Opus Arte
Mozart	Io, Don Giovanni	Zerlina	Film	2009		Eurozoom
Pergolesi	La serva padrona	Serpina	DVD	2012		Arthaus Musik
Rossini	Il turco in Italia	Fiorilla	DVD	2009		Naxos Records
Verdi	Un ballo in maschera	Oscar	DVD	2010		Opus Arte
Verdi	Un giorno di regno	Giulietta di Kelbar	DVD	2013		C Major
