= Il templario =

Opera by Otto Nicolai (1840)

- Opera by Otto Nicolai
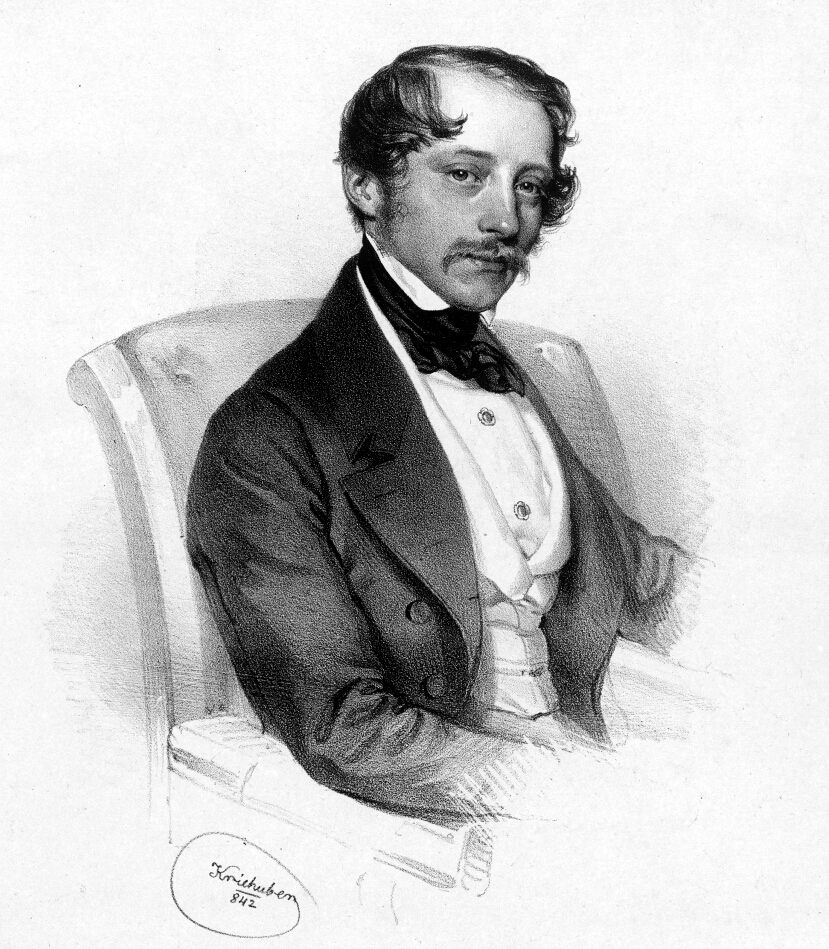
- The composer in 1842
- Librettist: Girolamo Maria Marini
- Language: Italian
- Premiere: 1840; Teatro Regio, Turin

Il templario is an Italian-language opera by the German composer Otto Nicolai from a libretto written by Girolamo Maria Marini based on Walter Scott's 1819 novel Ivanhoe.

It has been noted that Nicolai's work for the opera stage, before the successful Die lustigen Weiber von Windsor (The Merry Wives of Windsor) (his only German opera), included five others, all of which were in Italian (two being Gildippe ed Odoardo and Il proscritto) and all "are all firmly cast in the bel canto style, with gracefully flowing melodies in the manner of Bellini". Marini was a part-time poet when not employed by the government tobacco monopoly, and is best remembered today for being called in to rewrite the third act of Donizetti's Adelia.

After he studied Church music by Friedrich Zelter in Berlin he went to Rome in 1833, where the Prusian Embassy at the Vatican was looking for an organist. After visiting opera performances he became so enthusiastic that he decided to stay in Italy to build a career in opera.

After „La figlia abbandonata“ (Bologna, 1837) and „Enrico II.“ (Triest, 1839), as a conductor for the Carnaval season 1839/40 in Turin he wrote for Mercadante's „I briganti“ an extra aria. This aria had such a success, that Nicolai received the offer to write an opera that had to based on Sir Walter Scott's „Ivanhoe“ (just written in 1820, and very successful). Die Premiere von „Il templario“ in Turin am 11. Februar 1840 wurde ein veritabler Triumph, und das Werk wurde noch im selben Jahr in Genua, Mailand und Triest nachgespielt, 1841 in Wien und Barcelona gegeben

Il templario received its premiere performances at the Teatro Regio, Turin in February 11 1840, and was a huge success.

This had an unintended contributing indirect effect on the failure of Verdi's early attempt at the opera buffa genre, Un giorno di regno, in 1840. The Teatro alla Scala impresario Merelli insisted on using the opera seria singers previously assembled for Nicolai's opera, which had toured in Milan, thus contributing to the disaster experienced by Verdi.

== Performance history ==
Following its first Italian performances

Laviska notes that:

[The opera's] renown was so immediate, that productions were immediately scheduled for Genoa, Milan, and Trieste that same year, and in Venice, Vienna, Barcelona, Brescia, and Vicenza the year following. No fewer than seventeen productions were given in 1842, and the opera retained its popularity through the late 1860s, making it – alongside Mercadante's La vestale and Pacini's Saffo (both given in Naples, also in 1840) – one of the most lasting and well received Italian operas from this period.

After its original highly successful run in Italy, Il templario was forgotten, as fashion moved on and Nicolai's early death reduced interest in his work outside Germany. His father sold his autographs to Bote & Bock, who then filed and forgot them until 1937 when Joseph Goebbels was seeking pure-German operas to replace the removal of works by composers such as Meyerbeer from the German stage. Goebels was attracted to the story of Ivanhoe but sought to have Nicolai's opera rewritten to remove the flattering elements around the Jewish heroine Rebecca. However, the Second World War intervened before such a version could be made.

The rediscovered opera was again "lost" when the archives of both Bote & Bock in Berlin and Casa Ricordi in Milan were destroyed during World War II.

Re-discovery and reconstruction

However interest in Nicolai renewed in the 1990s and the music historian Michael Wittmann was finally able to reconstruct Il templario from various versions. These included a revision originally deposited with the local censor in Naples but found in the Conservatorio di Musica under the title Teodosia, a German language edition, and also a French piano-vocal score, which allowed for the complete reconstruction in 2006.

Following Wittmann's reconstruction, Il templario was then performed at the Chemnitz Opera in March 2008 conducted by Frank Beermann, with the American tenor Stanley Jackson as Ivanhoe. A live recording of the 7 March performance was later issued. After that Juan Diego Florez recommended it for performance during the Salzburger Festspiele. It received a (concert) performance there during the Festspiele of 2016. The title roll was also sung by Juan Diego FLorez, the rest of the main roles were CLémentine Margaine (Rebecca), Luca Salsi (Briano) and Kristiane Kaiser (Rovena). Andrés Orozco-Estrada conducted the Wiener Philharmoniker.

== Synopsis ==
Place: England
Time: 12th Century: the conflict between Anglo-Saxon nobles and their Norman conquerors

Following the story line of Ivanhoe, Vilfredo d’Ivanhoe is in love with Ravena, the ward of his father Cedrico, who wishes to marry her off for political advantage. Cedrico turns against his son, leading Ivanhoe to leave for the Crusades. Ivanhoe is wounded and cared for by the Jewish Rebecca, who with her father Isacco follows Ivanhoe back to England. Rebecca is in turn loved by Briano, the templar of the opera's title.

Act I

Scene I. A Tournament Field at Ashby

An unknown knight-errant has won the tournament. He will not remove his visor and his shield declares his mission - to fight injustice and the oppressed. He indicates that Ravena, ward of Cedrico, may place the laurel crown on his helmet As for himself he reveals he has sworn an oath of anonymity; all he will say is that he is a Saxon. A tournament feast closes the event and Cedric invites the knight to his castle as all depart the field. Briano, who lost the contest against the unknown knight, enters. Feeling the sting of his first defeat, his thoughts turn to his beloved Rebecca and his retinue urge him to abduct her.

Scene 4. A forecourt of Cedrico’s castle.

The servants are in celebratory mood but Ravena is troubled – she senses that this unknown victor may be Cedrico’s own son, Vilfredo, to whom she pledged loyalty many years before. Her reverie is disturbed by Rebecca’s cries for help. Briano’s men have attempted to kidnap Rebecca but she has broken free and with her father Isacco of York, beg for asylum in the castle and are granted entry. Rebecca’s fear gives way to joy when she learns that the unknown knight is also staying in the castle.

Scene 6. The empty forecourt.

Briano, whose retainers have concealed themselves in preparation for another ambush, calls on Cedrico to surrender Rebecca to him. Cedrico refuses, fighting breaks out and Vilfredo rushes in. Helmetless, he nevertheless draws his sword on Briano, but Briano’s men overcome have seized Rebecca and Brian threatens that if anyone attempts to interfere he will igve the signal for Rebecca to be killed. They drag Rebecca away, but not before Cedrico can observe that the unknown knight is his own son.

Act II

Scene 1. A room in a tower of The Knight Templars' Preceptory

In a dream Rebecca recalls how she found the wounded Vilfredo on the banks of the Jordan river and nursed him back to health, all the while falling in love with him. She awakes to the reality of her situation – a prisoner of Briano di Bois Guilbert. Briano enters and declares his love, saying he will renounce everything for her but she curtly rejects his offers, threatening to throw herself from the tower balcony if he dares to touch her. At that moment trumpets announcing the arrival of the Grand Preceptor, Luca di Beaumanoir; if Briano and Rebecca are caught together it will mean death for both of them.

Scene 3. The Armoury

A procession in honor of The Grand Master of the Templars, Luca is taking place. Isacco disrupts the celebration to beg for the release of his daughter, accusing Briano of the abduction. Luca furiously demands an explanation but Briano when brought before him, stays silent. The other knights condemn Briano but Luca learns that Rebecca learned her healing arts from a woman condemned as a witch and, anxious to deflect shame from one of his Templars, Luca declares that Rebecca must die by cleansing fire unless Briano accepts the challenge – a divine duel to the death between Briano and a champion. In other words, Briano’s life will be forfeit for her honor.

Scene 4. The forecourt of Cedrico’s castle.

Vilfredo is pleading for his father to grant forgiveness and banish his anger at Vilfredo for having, years before, disobeyed his father and joined the Crusades. Vilfredo is joined by Ravena and together they placate Cedrico, who relents and further bestows his blessing on Vilfredo’s and Ravena’s love.

Act III

Scene 1. A field in front of the Templars’ Preceptory

A pyre has been prepared while the entrance to the lists of the jousting field is to one side of the stage. The Templars fiercely declare that Rebecca must be guilty and may God’s wrath strike her downas no champion has emerged to defend her while women in the crowd pray that a champion will save her. A trumpet call is sounded for Rebecca’s champion to step forth but no champion appears. The trumpet sounds again and the pyre is lit but the clattering of horse’s hooves announces the arrival of a champion for Rebecca – it is Vilfredo.

Scene 2. Briano had intended to fall on the sword of his opponent but his fury at having been defeated by Vilfredo at Ashby wells up and the two spur their horses away for the duel. Isacco and the women in the crowd pray for Vilfredo’s triumph but almost immediately the shouts of victory are heard – Briano has been slain not by Vilfredo but by a bolt from heaven. All join in celebration but Rebecca throws herself at Vilfredo’s feet and reveals that she has loved Vilfredo from the moment she first saw him. Vilfredo cautions her that she must leave him and never see him again and she, overcome by grief, collapses and dies in her father’s arms.

== Recordings ==
Year	Cast: (Cedrico il Sassone, Vilfredo d'Ivanhoe, Revena, Rebecca, Briano di Bois-Guilbert, Issaco di York)	Conductor, Opera House and Orchestra	Label
2008	Kouta Räsänen, Stanley Jackson, Judith Kuhn, Tilna Penttinen, Hans Christoph Begemann, Andre Riemer	Frank Beermann, Robert-Schuman-Philharmonie and chorus of Oper Chemnitz (Recording of a performance on 7 March)	CD: Classic Produktion Osnabrück, Cat: 777 434-2
