= Antonio Superchi =

Italian opera singer

Antonio Superchi (11 January 1816 – 5 July 1893) was an Italian operatic baritone who had an active international career from 1838 to 1858. He appeared at most of the major opera houses in Italy and Spain, and at Her Majesty's Theatre in London.

The Times reviewed the quality of his voice in 1847 (22 April): "It is impossible for a singer to be more free than Superchi from this defect of his predecessor (Luciano Fornasari, who never surmounted his tremulousness). His notes are as firm as possible, and his flow of song is in the highest degree smooth and even".

Born into a wealthy family—father Paolo and mother Gaetana, a lady of the Manghi family—in Parma, he studied singing in his native city with Antonio De Cesari and Luigi Tartagnini. He made his professional opera debut in 1838 at La Fenice in Venice as Enrico in Gaetano Donizetti's Lucia di Lammermoor. In 1843 he created the role of Ernesto Malcolm in the world premiere of Giovanni Pacini's Maria, regina d'Inghilterra at the Teatro Carolino in Palermo. On 9 March 1844 he sang the part of Don Carlo in the world premiere of Giuseppe Verdi's Ernani at La Fenice. He retired from the stage in 1858, after which he was active as a singing teacher in Parma. He died there in 1893 at the age of 77.
