= Villa Verdi =

Coordinates: 45°0′20.7″N 10°2′9.4″E

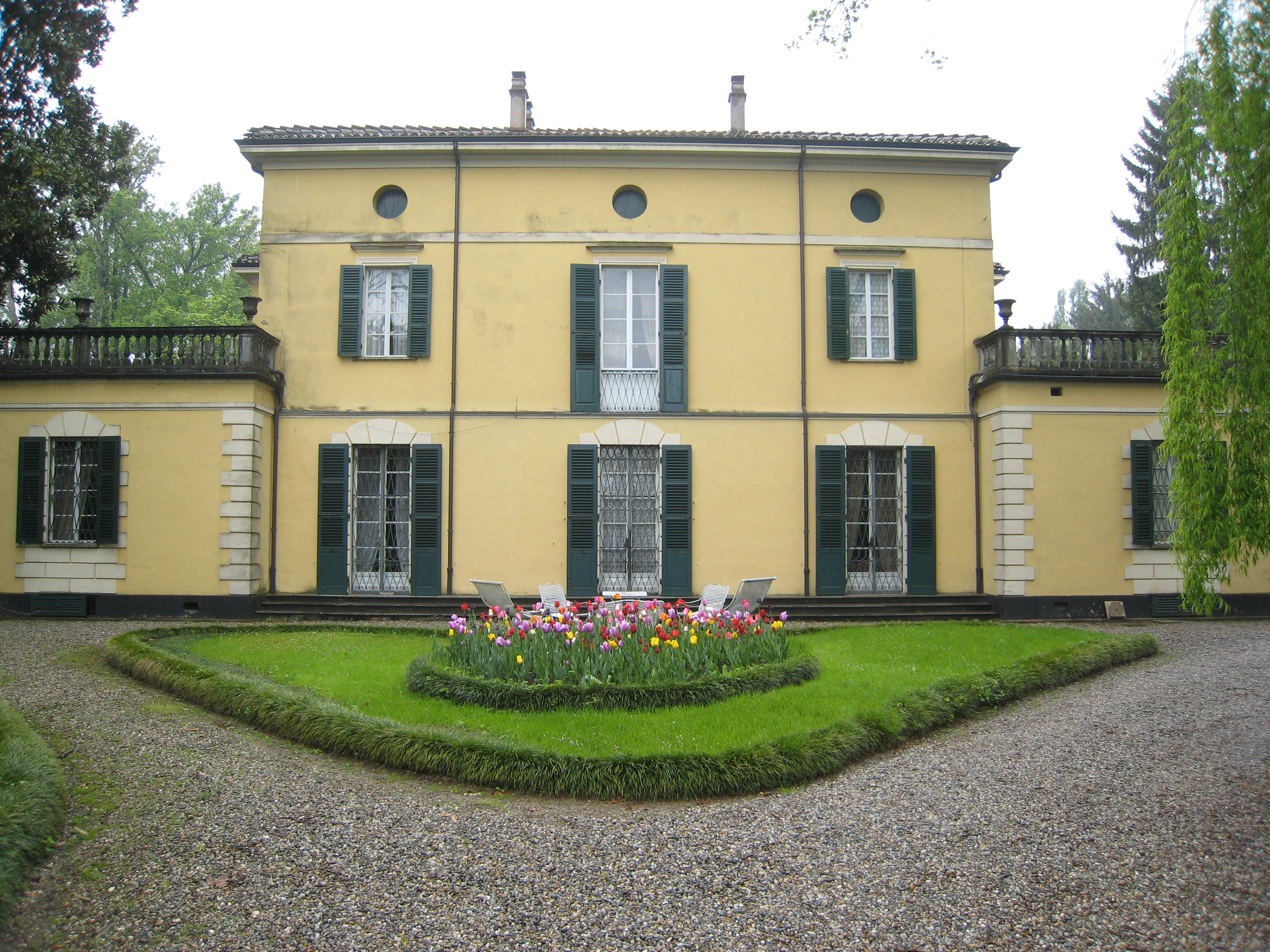
- Verdi's house at Sant'Agata
- Interactive map of the Villa Verdi area

General information
- Construction started: 1848
- Completed: 1880
- Owner: Carrara Verdi family

Website
- villaverdi.info/en/museo

Villa Verdi is the estate house that composer Giuseppe Verdi ordered built in 1848 on farmland he had owned for four years and where he lived from that year until the end of his life. It is in the village of Sant'Agata 3.5 km north of the town of Busseto, which itself lies 4.5 km west-north-west of the tiny village of Le Roncole, where Verdi was born. The two villages and the town are today part of the comune of Villanova sull'Arda in the Province of Piacenza.

== History ==
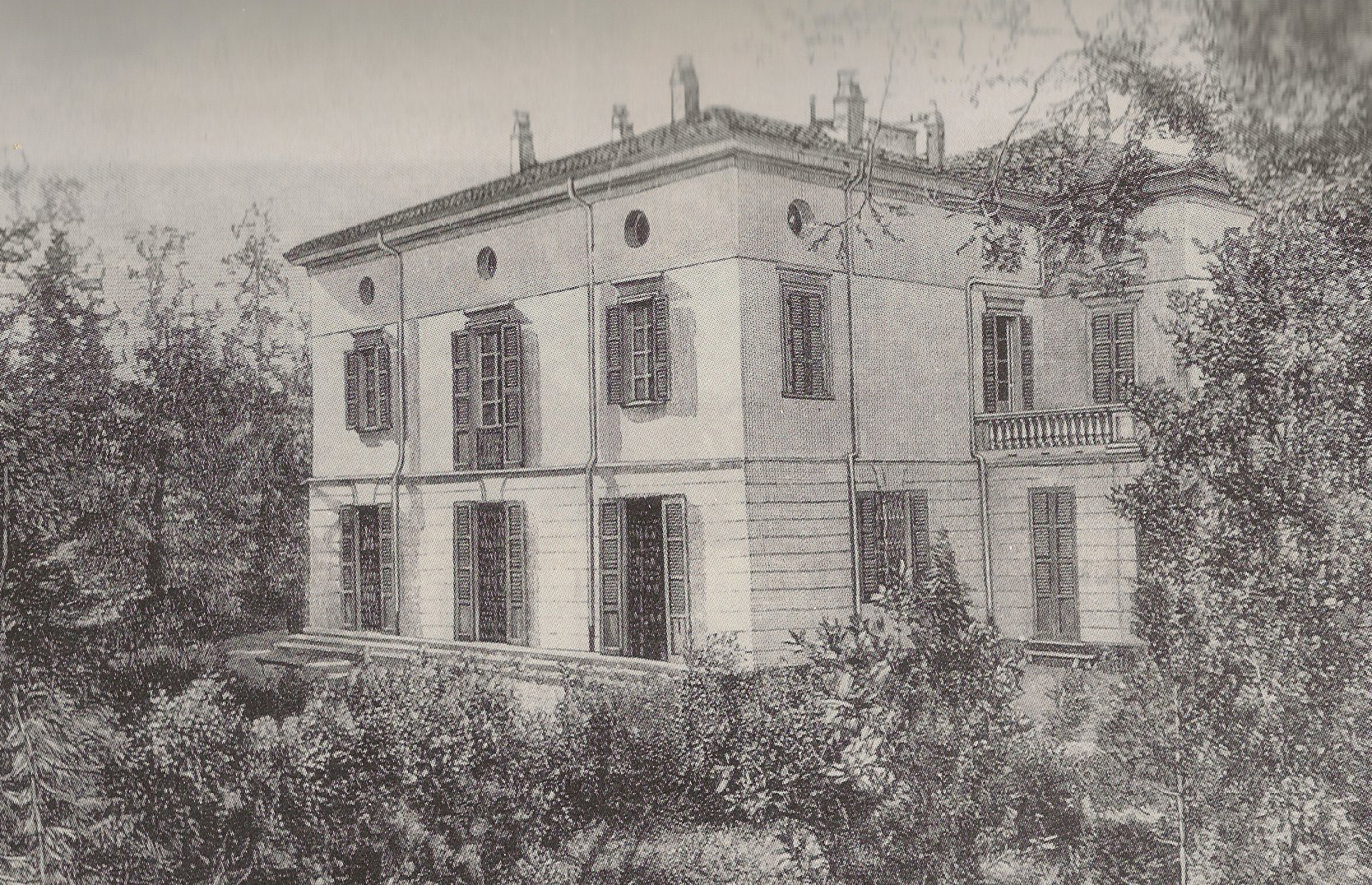
Villa Verdi as it looked in 1859–1865.

Verdi bought the farmland in 1844 before commissioning the house, which his parents occupied starting in 1848 and which was completed, after various stops and starts, in 1880. After the death of Verdi's mother his father moved into town, i.e. Busseto. Verdi and Giuseppina Strepponi, the opera singer with whom he lived prior to their 1859 marriage, moved into the Villa in 1851.

There had been a farmhouse on the property when Verdi bought it, and the composer's building work began as extended wings onto it. But the project grew such that the original home was replaced: the two wings had terraces to the front, and there were greenhouses added and a chapel and garages for coaches in the rear. Strepponi and Verdi greatly expanded the garden around the house and planted many trees, some exotic in origin and a few still alive.

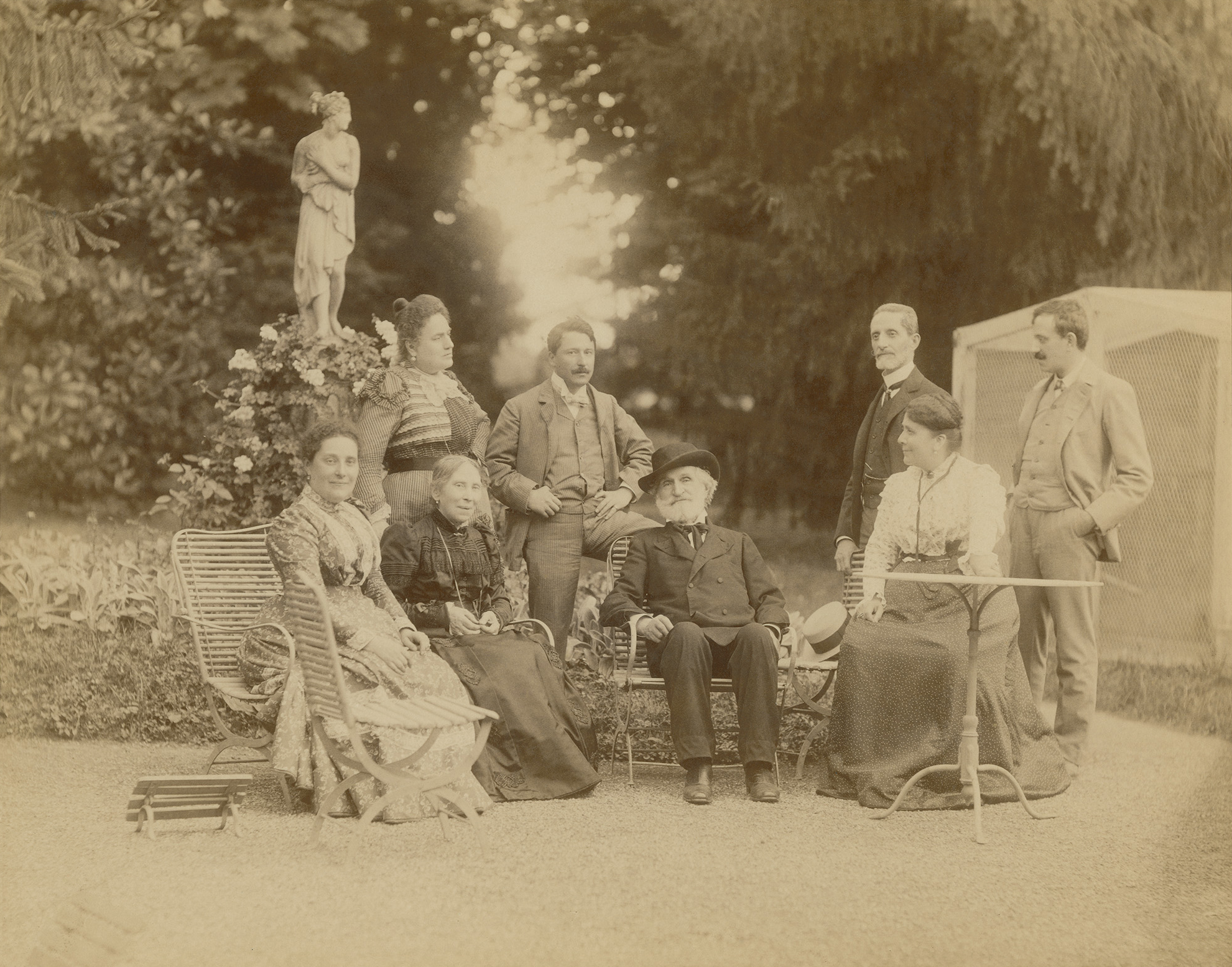
On the grounds of the Villa Verdi in 1900: Standing: Teresa Stolz, Umberto Campanari, Giulio Ricordi, and Leopoldo Metlicovitz. Seated: Maria Carrara Verdi, Barberina Strepponi (Giuseppina's sister), Giuseppe Verdi, and Giuditta Ricordi (Giulio's wife).

Apart from his visits to European cities, sometimes wintering in Genoa, and part of the winters of 1862 and 1863 in Russia for the premiere of La forza del destino, most of Verdi's life was lived at the Villa. After Strepponi's death in 1897, Verdi spent less time there. He personally oversaw the management of the estate and ran a profitable farming business.

== Visits to the Villa Verdi ==
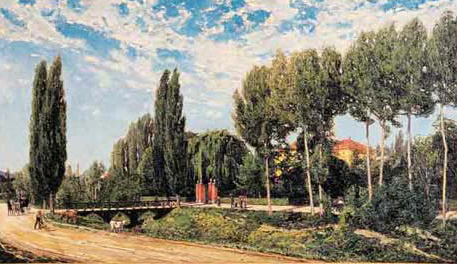
View of the setting of the Villa Verdi in an 1870 painting.

Today, the Villa is owned by four siblings who are descendants of Verdi's younger cousin, Maria Filomena Verdi, whom Verdi and his wife brought up as a daughter. This is the Carrara-Verdi family, and they live year-round in parts of the Villa.

Starting in 2010, Angiolo Carrara Verdi has been managing Villa Verdi which is also partly used as a museum. Visitors are allowed to view five rooms located on the ground floor of the south wing which were occupied by the composer and his wife. Other upstairs rooms were used by servants and guests.

The rooms include Strepponi's own room with its original canopy bed, where she died in November 1897; the dressing room dominated today by the Fritz piano which Verdi used from the time of Rigoletto in 1851 to Aida in 1871; Verdi's bedroom where he slept and worked; plus the study off the bedroom, where Verdi generally kept his accounts, now contains piano scores and much memorabilia relating to Verdi's life. The final room, the Grand Hotel et de Milan room, contains the furniture from Room 157 of the Hotel de Milan which is located close to La Scala and where Verdi died on 27 January 1901. The room also contains the shirt which Verdi was wearing at his death, plus a deathmask. Visitors are also able to see Verdi's coaches and tour the park containing over 100 varieties of tree and the ice house.

== See also ==
- National Giuseppe Verdi Museum
- List of music museums
