= Eugenia Tadolini =

Italian operatic soprano

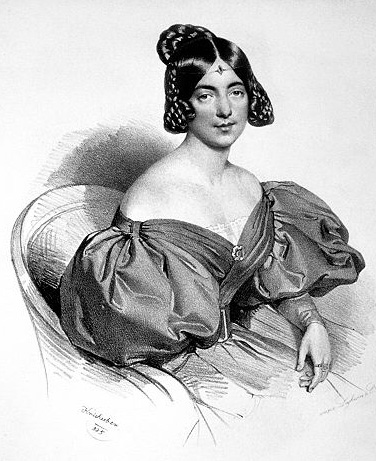
- Portrait by Josef Kriehuber
- Born: Eugenia Savorani; July 9, 1808 July 9, 1808; Forlì, Italy
- Died: July 11, 1872 (aged 64); Paris, France
- Occupation: Opera singer (soprano)

Eugenia Tadolini (née Savorani) (July 9, 1808 – 11 July 1872) was an Italian operatic soprano. Admired for the beauty of her voice and stage presence, she was one of Donizetti's favourite singers. During her career she created over 20 leading roles, including the title roles in Donizetti's Linda di Chamounix and Maria di Rohan and Verdi's Alzira. She was born in Forlì and studied music there and in Bologna before making her debut in Florence in 1828. She sang in all of Italy's leading opera houses, as well as in Paris, Vienna, and London before retiring from the stage in 1852. She spent her remaining years first in Naples, where she had been the Teatro San Carlo's reigning prima donna for many years, and then in Paris, where she died of typhoid fever at the age of 63. From 1827 to 1834, she was married to the Italian composer and singing teacher, Giovanni Tadolini.

== Biography ==
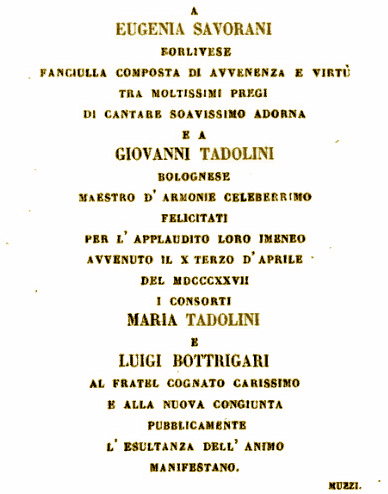
Congratulation notice for the marriage of Eugenia Savorani and Giovanni Tadolini, 13 April 1827

=== Early years and first successes ===
Eugenia Tadolini was born into a prosperous middle-class family in Forlì. Her father, Filippo Savorani, a high-ranking civil servant, saw to it that she received a good education for the time, including music lessons with Luigi Favi and Giovanni Grilli at the music academy in Forlì. When she began to develop a soprano voice, described by a contemporary biographer as "sweet, powerful, charming, and with perfect intonation", she was sent to Bologna to study with Giovanni Tadolini (1785–1872), a well-known composer, conductor and singing teacher.

She and Giovanni Tadolini married on 13 April 1827. She was 18 and he 42. The following year she made her stage debut in Florence. A brilliant house debut at the Teatro Regio di Parma followed on 29 December 1829 when she sang Giulietta in the theatre's first performance of Nicola Vaccai's Giulietta e Romeo. She appeared there the following year in the theatre's first performances of two Rossini operas – as Amenaide in Tancredi and as Bianca in Bianca e Falliero. Tadolini's husband was a close friend and admirer of the composer who was also living in Bologna at the time. In 1830, she sang in a soirée at Rossini's house there, the highlight of which was Rossini himself singing an aria from The Barber of Seville. She also sang Zoraide in Rossini's Ricciardo e Zoraide in its first performance at the Théâtre-Italien in Paris (23 October 1830). Although the Rossinian repertoire (including Rosina in The Barber of Seville) figured primarily in the earliest years of her career, she would later sing the title role in his Armida for a major revival at La Scala in 1836.

By the summer of 1830, Eugenia and Giovanni Tadolini had settled in Paris where both were engaged at the Théâtre-Italien, she as a singer in a company that included Maria Malibran and Giuditta Pasta and he as maestro concertatore. Their marriage proved to be an unhappy one, however. The couple separated in 1833 and were divorced in 1834. Following her separation from her husband, she returned to Italy where she was soon in great demand in that country's opera houses, singing leading roles at La Scala, La Fenice, the Teatro Regio di Torino, and the Teatro San Carlo, amongst others.

=== Donizetti, Verdi, Bellini, and Mercadante heroines ===
Eugenia Tadolini as Adina in Donizetti's L'elisir d'amore, a role to which she was particularly suited.

Gaetano Donizetti said of Tadolini, "She is a singer, she is an actress, she is everything". Tadolini's association with Donizetti began in 1831 when she sang the role of Giovanna Seymour in the premiere of the second version of Anna Bolena at The King's Theatre in London. She sang the role again at the Théâtre-Italien in Paris for its French premiere later that year. By 1842, she had graduated to singing the title role in Anna Bolena (at the Theater am Kärntnertor in Vienna). In that same year she sang the title role in world premiere of Donizetti's Linda di Chamounix which he wrote specifically for her voice. In 1843, she created the title role in his Maria di Rohan, again specifically written for her voice. She went on to sing in the Italian premieres of his Poliuto (as Paolina) and La favorita (as Leonora). Her other notable Donizetti roles which she sang in some of their earliest performances included Eleonora in Il furioso all'isola di San Domingo (in its first performance at La Scala), the title role in Fausta, Pia in Pia de' Tolomei, Eleonora in L'esule di Roma, ossia Il proscritto, Antonina in Belisario, Elena in Marino Faliero, the title role in Maria Padilla, Gemma in Gemma di Vergy, Norina in Don Pasquale, and Adina in L'elisir d'amore. One of her earliest performances as Adina had been in Vienna in 1835. When she sang the role for the 1842 revival of L'elisir d'amore in Naples, Donizetti composed a completely new final cabaletta for her, "Obblia le tue pene".

An early admirer of Verdi, she created the title role of Alzira in 1845 and sang in some of the earliest performances of four of his other operas: Griselda in I Lombardi alla prima crociata, Elvira in Ernani, Odabella in Attila, and Lady Macbeth in Macbeth. She in turn was admired by Verdi's wife, Giuseppina Strepponi, who termed her "one of the greatest talents we possess". In 1844 she sang in the Vienna premiere of Ernani after which, the composer heard (much to his annoyance) that she had substituted her Act I cavatina, "Ernani! Ernani, involami" with Giselda's cavatina "Non fu sogno" from I Lombardi alla prima crociata. Nevertheless, the Vienna premiere was a resounding success, even without the original cavatina, and Verdi was determined to have her as his first Alzira. He even delayed the rehearsals until she recovered from the birth of her child. In 1848, however, he wanted her to be replaced as Lady Macbeth for the first Naples performance of Macbeth on the grounds that her voice and appearance were too beautiful. In his often quoted letter to Salvadore Cammarano, which he wanted passed on to the Teatro San Carlo management, Verdi wrote:

You know how highly I regard Tadolini, and she herself knows it; but I believe it's necessary – for the interest of all concerned. Tadolini's qualities are far too good for that role! This may seem absurd to you!! ... Tadolini has a beautiful and attractive appearance; and I would like Lady Macbeth to be ugly and evil. Tadolini sings to perfection; and I would like the Lady not to sing. Tadolini has a stupendous voice, clear, limpid, powerful; and I would like the Lady to have a harsh, stifled, and hollow voice. Tadolini's voice has an angelic quality; I would like the Lady's voice to be diabolical.

Despite Verdi's urging, and the best efforts of Cammarano, the theatre refused to replace her, as she was one of its reigning stars at the time.

Verdi's view of her unsuitability for roles like Lady Macbeth was similar to that expressed 10 years earlier by Felice Romani who saw her in Bellini's La straniera. Although he praised the quality of her singing in the performance, and was a long time admirer of Tadolini, Romani found her lovely voice and appearance less than ideal for a role like Alaide:

She has too many gifts for Alaide, too much light in her beautiful eyes, too much charm in her smile, for the mysterious Foreign Woman. Her voice full, sweet, and embellished, is made for joy, for the love that consoles, for afflictions borne with hope, not for torments and a stormy heart, not for the ravings of a soul in anguish, not for the cries of despair.

Tadolini sang several other Bellini heroines in addition to Alaide, most notably Elvira in I puritani, Imogene in Il pirata, the title role in Norma and Amina in La sonnambula. Her Amina which she sang in Vienna, Paris, and several Italian theatres, was particularly admired.

She was also closely associated with the operas of Saverio Mercadante. Tadolini sang in the world premieres of his Emma d'Antiochia, Le due illustri rivali, and Il bravo, ossia La veneziana and in the premiere of the revised version of Francesca Donato ossia Corinto distrutta, as well as in some of the earliest performances of his Il giuramento and Orazi e Curiazi. Mercadante had also written the role of Lea in La schiava saracena expressly for her voice. However, the outbreak of the 1848 Revolution in Milan aborted the premiere and forced the temporary closure of La Scala. Another soprano, Carlotta Gruitz, sang the role in its official premiere later that year. Tadolini eventually sang Lea in 1850, for the premiere of the work's revised version at the Teatro San Carlo.

=== Naples and London ===
The Teatro San Carlo in Naples as it looked during the time that Tadolini sang there.

From 1842, Eugenia Tadolini was primarily based at the Teatro San Carlo in Naples, although she still performed in other Italian theatres and abroad. She sang in the world premieres of at least 12 operas at the Teatro San Carlo, most of them now forgotten, apart from Verdi's Alzira and Donizetti's Poliuto. During that time, she also formed a relationship with a Neapolitan nobleman by whom she had two children, both of whom died in childhood.

In the spring of 1848, she travelled to London for what the contemporary press often billed as her "debut", although she had appeared there in 1831 in the secondary role of Giovanna Seymour for the London premiere of Donizetti's Anna Bolena. This time she was returning as an established star and was to sing the title role in Linda di Chamounix opposite Sims Reeves at Her Majesty's Theatre. In the week prior to the opening of Linda di Chamounix, The Musical World printed an extract from a letter by The Times political correspondent in Italy, extolling her virtues (dated 26 March 1848):

Madame Tadolini, who, for the first time is about to appear in London, I am sure will become a great favorite, as she possesses all qualities necessary to captivate an English audience. She is inclined to embonpoint, but she is very handsome on the stage, with dangerous eyes—the whitest shoulder in the world—and a sense of enjoyment in her acting, which your audience will not be able to resist. Tadolini's voice is a clear soprano-mezzo-soprano in its richest quality, with an intonation that approaches, when necessary, to the contralto. It is as clear as a bell, round, full, and sonorous, perfectly flexible and capable of all those modulations which a great artist like her dashes off, but which are so painful and difficult to thinner voices, and less qualified science. I heard the prima donna to great disadvantage, as she disdained to sing to an empty house (from political excitement), and used merely one half of her powers. Her acting was equally restrained, but the inward spirit could not be altogether subdued, and she occasionally broke forth into silvery and impassioned notes, and abandoned herself to that natural gaiety of song that rendered her in the scene the most captivating of coquettes. Had Tadolini known that the Times has ears everywhere, she might have exerted herself to please them; but criticism has art and judgment, and though she sung at mezzo voce, it was not difficult to prognosticate complete success for her at Her Majesty's Theatre.

While her reception at the opening night of Linda di Chamounix was very warm, it was not the ecstatic one predicted by the press. Sims Reeves' performance, on the other hand, was described as "triumphant". Tadolini was nearly 40 at the time, and her voice may have been past its prime. However William Ashbrook has suggested that her relative lack of success with the British public may be partly attributable to its obsession with Jenny Lind at the time. While in London, she also sang Norina in Don Pasquale (again warmly, but not ecstatically, received) and participated in several concerts before returning to Naples. Later that year she sang in the Teatro San Carlo's first performance of Verdi's Attila and in the posthumous premiere of Donizetti's Poliuto.

=== Final years ===
Paris seen from Père Lachaise Cemetery

Between 1849 and 1851, Tadolini sang in three world premieres at the Teatro San Carlo – as Elfrida in Puzone's Elfrida di Salerno (1849), as Caterina in Lillo's Caterina Howard (1849), and as Elfrida in De Giosa's Folco d'Arles (1851). During that time she also sang in the theatre's first performances of Verdi's Macbeth, Donizetti's La favorita, and Mercadante's La schiava saracena. She ventured out of her adopted city in December 1852 to sing Giselda in Verdi's I Lombardi alla prima crociata at the Teatro Metastasio in Prato. After that she retired from the stage and settled down in Naples with her only surviving child. He too would die three years later in the city's 1855–56 cholera epidemic. In 1860, Garibaldi and his troops invaded the city. King Francis II and his court fled to north to Gaeta. Tadolini and her current lover, a young Neapolitan prince, fled to Paris, where she spent the remaining 12 years of her life. Once she was settled in Paris, she wrote to her brother:

Long live Garibaldi for getting me here!...After my terrible misfortune, this is the first time I feel alive. What life!

At first she lived in an apartment on the Champs-Élysées, but worried that her money would run out, she later moved to less expensive quarters on the Rue du Faubourg Saint-Honoré.

In July 1872, she contracted typhoid fever and initially refused to see a doctor because it brought back memories of her children's deaths. Eugenia Tadolini died of the disease on 11 July 1872 at the age of 63 and was buried in Père Lachaise Cemetery.

== Roles created ==
Eugenia Tadolini is known to have sung in the following world premieres:

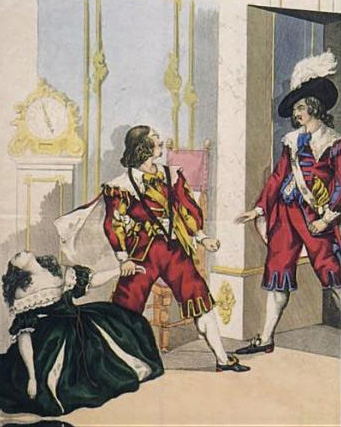
Eugenia Tadolini, Carlo Guasco and Giorgio Ronconi in the final scene of Donizetti's Maria di Rohan at its world premiere in Vienna, 1843

- Adelia, Emma d'Antiochia (Saverio Mercadante). 9 March 1834, La Fenice, Venice
- Elvira, Le due illustri rivali (Saverio Mercadante). 10 March 1838, La Fenice, Venice
- Violetta, Il bravo, ossia La veneziana (Saverio Mercadante). 9 March 1839, La Scala, Milan
- Linda, Linda di Chamounix (Gaetano Donizetti). 19 May 1842, Kärntnertortheater, Vienna
- Elodia, Elodia di Herstall, (Alessandro Curmi). 26 September 1842, Teatro San Carlo, Naples
- Lara, Lara (Giuseppe Lillo), 22 November 1842, Teatro San Carlo, Naples
- Rosa, La fidanzata corsa (Giovanni Pacini). 10 December 1842, Teatro San Carlo, Naples
- Maria, Maria di Rohan (Gaetano Donizetti). 5 June 1843, Kärntnertortheater, Vienna
- Alzira, Alzira (Giuseppe Verdi). 12 August 1845, Teatro San Carlo, Naples
- Elvira, Mortedo, (Vincenzo Capecelatro). 8 September 1845, Teatro San Carlo, Naples
- Stella, Stella di Napoli (Giovanni Pacini). 11 December 1845, Teatro San Carlo, Naples
- La sirena, La sirena di Normandia (Pietro Torregiani). 18 January 1846, Teatro San Carlo, Naple
- Amelia, Emo (Vincenzo Battista), 14 February 1846, Teatro San Carlo, Naples
- Bianca, Bianca Contarini (Lauro Rossi). 24 February 1847, La Scala, Milan
- Velleda, Velleda (Carlo Boniforti), 19 March 1847, La Scala, Milan
- Irene, Gusmano il Buono ossia L'assedio di Tarifa (Marco Aurelio Marliani). 6 November 1847, Teatro Comunale di Bologna, Bologna
- Giovanna, Giovanna di Fiandra (Carlo Boniforti). 8 February 1848, La Scala, Milan
- Paolina, Poliuto (Gaetano Donizetti). 30 November 1848, Teatro San Carlo, Naples
- Elfrida, Elfrida da Salerno (Giuseppe Puzone). 23 June 1849, Teatro San Carlo, Naples
- Caterina Howard, Caterina Howard (Giuseppe Lillo). 26 September 1849, Teatro San Carlo, Naples
- Elfrida, Folco d'Arles (Nicola De Giosa). 1851, Teatro San Carlo, Naples
