= Carlo Guasco =

Italian opera singer (1813–1876)

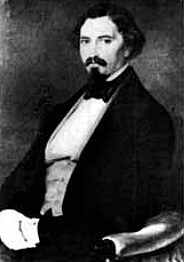
Carlo Guasco

Carlo Guasco (16 March 1813 – 13 December 1876) was a celebrated Italian operatic tenor who sang in Italian and other European opera houses from 1837 to 1853. Although he sang in many world premieres, he is most remembered today for having created the leading tenor roles in Verdi's I Lombardi alla prima crociata, Ernani, and Attila.

== Biography ==
Carlo Guasco was born in Solero, a small town in the Piedmont region of Italy. He showed an early talent for music and singing as well as mathematics, and initially trained as a surveyor at the University of Turin. He also studied piano with his cousin, Giuseppe Guasco. When the voice teacher and composer, Giacomo Panizza, heard Guasco's voice, he convinced him to give up his work as a surveyor and study with him in Milan. Guasco overcame the objections of his family to a career on the stage and began his studies with Panizza in September 1836. After only a few months, he made his stage debut at La Scala singing the relatively minor role of Ruodi in the 1837 production of Rossini's William Tell. His debut was a great success and he soon went on to create the leading tenor roles in several operas, most notably in Donizetti's Maria di Rohan (1843) and Verdi's I Lombardi alla prima crociata (1843), Ernani (1844), and Attila (1846). During the course of his career, he sang throughout Italy, as well as in Paris, London, Madrid, Saint Petersburg, and Vienna.

Guasco's voice, described by contemporary critics as "sweet rather than robust", was well suited to the operas of Rossini, Donizetti, Pacini, and Mercadante, which formed his core repertoire in the early years of his career. However his voice was neither sweet nor robust in his performance on the opening night of Ernani. A displeased Verdi wrote, "Yesterday we heard Ernani with Guasco without a voice and appallingly hoarse." Guasco was hoarse from shouting all afternoon at the management of La Fenice, where the opera premiered on 9 March 1844. The backstage areas were in chaos, with the sets still not ready and costumes missing. One of his tirades reportedly went on for more than an hour. He was also nervous about taking on a role which he felt was ill-suited to his voice, and as late as three weeks before the premiere, he had tried to withdraw from the production. Nevertheless, the opening night was a success for Verdi, and once Guasco settled into the role, Verdi's friend, Giovanni Barezzi, reported that Guasco's subsequent performances in the run were much improved. Guasco sang Ernani again for its first performance at La Scala in September 1844. This time the critic for Il Bazar wrote:

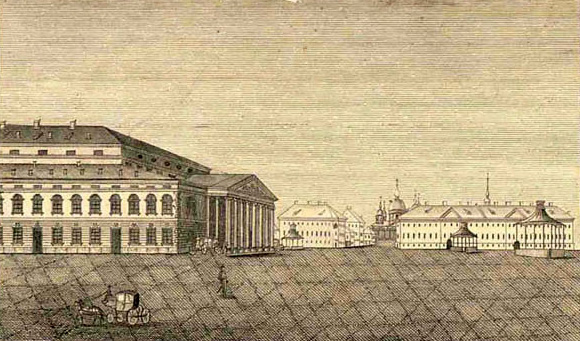
Bolshoi Kamenny Theatre in Saint Petersburg where Guasco sang from 1846 to 1848

The always excellent first tenor, Carlo Guasco, gifted with a superbly even voice, sang and acted the role of the protagonist with exquisite artistry ... he persuaded everyone he is still a vocalist of the first magnitude and has no rivals when it comes to singing gracefully, sweetly, and emotionally.

After singing in Ferrara in the spring of 1846, Guasco went to Saint Petersburg on a contract with the Imperial Italian Opera. He appeared there with great success in Ernani, Maria di Rohan, Norma, I due Foscari, I Lombardi alla prima crociata, and Linda di Chamounix. At the end of the 1848 season, despite the offer of renewed contract, he returned to Italy and Solero, the town of his birth. He took what proved to be a temporary break from his career, devoting himself to the activities that he had enjoyed in his youth, especially hunting. In August 1851 he married, and at the urging of his young wife took up his career again. He accepted the offer of a contract for the 1852 carnival season at the Théâtre-Italien in Paris, where he again had a success in Ernani. However, political upheaval following the French coup of 1851, led to half-empty theatres, making life difficult for the impresarios and singers alike. In the spring of 1853, he was offered a contract for a few performances in Vienna, after which he retired from the stage. He returned again to Solero, where he became active in the town's administration. He also taught singing. His most notable pupil was the dramatic tenor, Giovanni Battista De Negri, who became a famous interpreter of Verdi's Otello.

Guasco died in Solero on 13 December 1876 at the age of 63.

== Roles ==
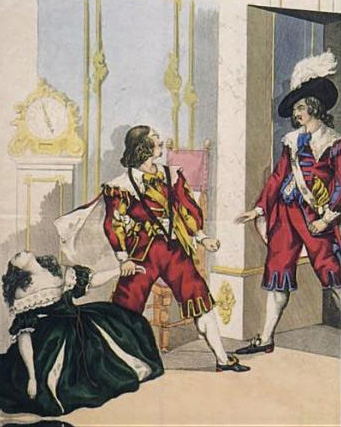
Eugenia Tadolini, Giorgio Ronconi, and Carlo Guasco in the final scene of Donizetti's Maria di Rohan at its world premiere in Vienna on 5 June 1843

- Ruodi, Wiliam Tell by Gioachino Rossini
- Gerardo, L'ammalata e il consulto by Giuseppe Manusardi (world premiere, 1837 Milan)
- Ubaldo, Elena da Feltre by Saverio Mercadante
- Arturo, Lucia di Lammermoor by Gaetano Donizetti
- Decio, La vestale by Saverio Mercadante
- Oronte, I Lombardi alla prima crociata by Giuseppe Verdi (world premiere)
- Riccardo di Chalais, Maria di Rohan by Gaetano Donizetti (world premiere)
- Riccardo Percy, Anna Bolena by Gaetano Donizetti
- Enrico, Giovanna I di Napoli by Pietro Antonio Coppola
- Ernani, Ernani by Giuseppe Verdi (world premiere)
- Carlo VII, Giovanna d'Arco by Giuseppe Verdi
- Oliviero, Adelia o La figlia dell'arciere by Gaetano Donizetti
- Selim, La sposa d'Abido by Józef Michał Poniatowski (world premiere)
- Foresto, Attila by Giuseppe Verdi (world premiere)
- Galeotto Manfredi, Galeotto Manfredi by Carlo Hermann (world premiere, 1842 Verona)
- Gonzalvo, Vallombra by Federico Ricci
- Gerardo di Coucy, La regina di Cipro by Giovanni Pacini
- Il Conte di San Megrino, Caterina di Cleves by Luigi Savi
- Orombello, Beatrice di Tenda by Vincenzo Bellini

== Sources ==
- Casaglia, Gherardo (2005)."Performances by Carlo Guasco". L'Almanacco di Gherardo Casaglia (in Italian).
- Conati, M., "Observations on the early reviews of Verdi's Ernani, Ernani yesterday and today, Volume 10 of Bollettino of the Istituto nazionale di studi verdiani, EDT srl, 1989. ISBN 88-85065-06-6
- Kimbell, David R., Verdi in the Age of Italian Romanticism, Cambridge University Press Archive, 1985. ISBN 0-521-31678-2
- Modugno, M., "The discography of Ernani, 1899–1985", Ernani yesterday and today, Volume 10 of Bollettino of the Istituto nazionale di studi verdiani, EDT srl, 1989. ISBN 88-85065-06-6
- Phillips-Matz, Mary Jane, Verdi: A Biography, Oxford University Press, 1993, ISBN 978-0-19-313204-7
- Regli, Francesco, "Guasco, Carlo", Dizionario biografico dei più celebri poeti ed artisti melodrammatici, tragici e comici, maestri, concertisti, coreografi, mimi, ballerini, scenografi, giornalisti, impresarii, ecc. ecc. che fiorirono in Italia dal 1800 al 1860, E. Dalmazzo, 1860, pp. 253–256 (in Italian)
