= Maria di Rohan =

Opera by Gaetano Donizetti

- Opera by Gaetano Donizetti
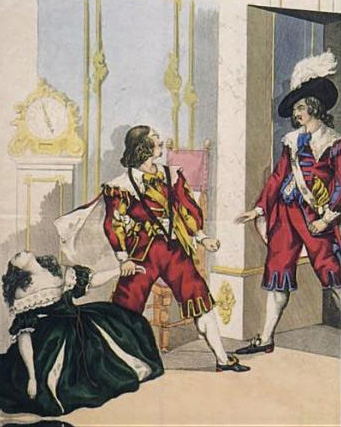
- Eugenia Tadolini, Giorgio Ronconi and Carlo Guasco in the final scene of Maria di Rohan at the Vienna premiere
- Description: melodramma tragico
- Librettist: Salvadore Cammarano
- Language: Italian
- Premiere: 5 June 1843; Kärntnertortheater, Vienna

Maria di Rohan is a melodramma tragico, or tragic opera, in three acts by Gaetano Donizetti. The Italian libretto was written by Salvadore Cammarano, after Lockroy and Edmond Badon's Un duel sous le cardinal de Richelieu, which had played in Paris in 1832. The story is based on events of the life of Marie de Rohan.

== Performance history ==
The opera premiered at the Kärntnertortheater, Vienna on 5 June 1843. In newer times, it was staged by the Grand Théâtre de Genève in 2001 and by the Donizetti Festival, Bergamo, in 2011. The opera was performed in concert by Opera Rara, London, in 2009 and by Washington Concert Opera in 2018.

== Roles ==
Role	Voice type	Premiere Cast, 5 June 1843 (Conductor: - )	Revised version, 14 November 1843 Paris
Maria, countess of Rohan	soprano	Eugenia Tadolini	Giulia Grisi
Riccardo, count of Chalais	tenor	Carlo Guasco	Lorenzo Salvi
Enrico, duke of Chevreuse	baritone	Giorgio Ronconi	Giorgio Ronconi
Armando di Gondì	tenor (then contralto)	Michele Novaro	Marietta Brambilla
The visconte of Suze	bass	Friedrich Becher	Giovanni Rizzi
de Fiesque	bass	Gustav Hölzel	
Aubry, secretary of Chalais	tenor	Anton Müller	Nicola Ivanoff
A familiar of Chevreuse	bass		
Knights, the king's cabinet, pages, guards and domestic servants of Chevreuse

== Synopsis ==
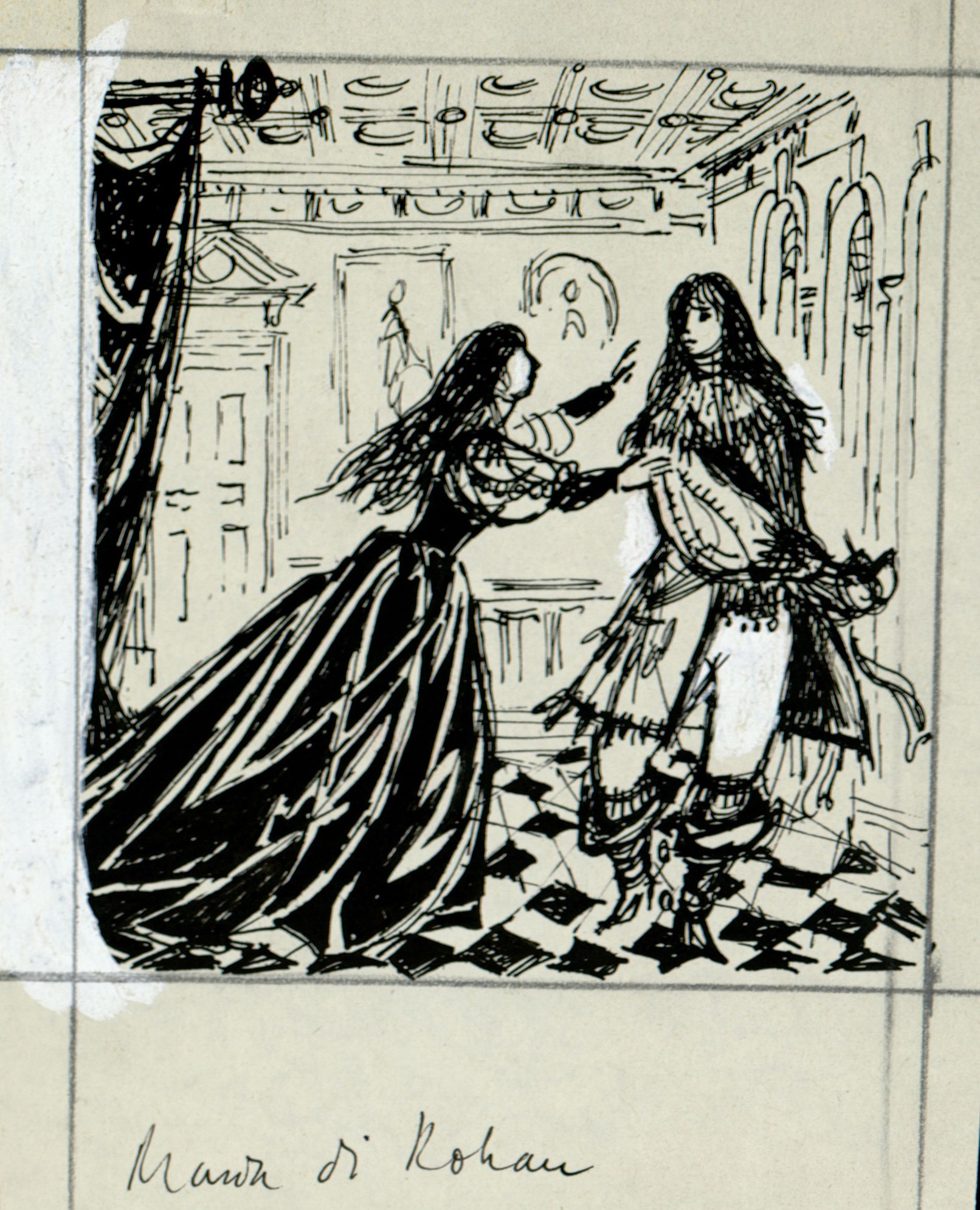
Disegno per copertina di libretto, drawing for Maria di Rohan (undated).

The story of Maria Di Rohan is both simple (the classic love triangle) and complicated. Chalais loves Maria, who has been forced to secretly marry Chevreuse. Chevreuse is in deep trouble, because he has killed a nephew of the powerful Cardinal Richelieu. The opera is divided into three parts: Unfortunate Consequences of Duels; Not Love But Gratitude; Senseless Revenge.

Time: Around 1630
Place: Paris

=== Act 1 ===
The royal palace

Maria seeks Chalais’ help in obtaining a pardon for Chevreuse. Chalais succeeds in this, but still does not know that Maria and Chevreuse are married. Gondi appears on the scene and insults Maria. Chalais challenges Gondi to a duel, and a grateful Chevreuse offers to be Chalais's second. Richelieu is suddenly ousted from the court, and Chalais is offered his post. Richelieu's demise means that Chevreuse can now disclose his marriage without fear. Chalais despairs, as the others congratulate him on his good fortune.

=== Act 2 ===
In Chalais's mansion

Chalais writes a love letter to Maria and encloses her portrait. The letter and portrait are locked in his desk, to be given to Maria should he perish. He's suddenly visited by Maria who tells him that Richelieu has regained power. She tells Chalais to flee or Richelieu, who sees him as an enemy, will have him executed. Chevreuse is heard approaching and Maria hides in an adjoining chamber. Chevreuse tells Chalais that they must leave for the duel with Gondi. Chevreuse leaves. Chalais says he will follow, but first stays to profess his love for Maria. She also admits that she has always and continues to love him. The Viscount arrives and explains that too much time has passed: Chevreuse is now to fight the duel in Chalais's place.

=== Act 3 ===
Chevreuse’s residence

Chevreuse, who was only slightly wounded in the duel, tells Maria and Chalais that he will arrange to have Chalais escape from the city. Chalais leaves, and again, everything looks good at first, but disaster strikes. Chalais’ letter and Maria's portrait, hidden in Chalais's desk, are discovered by one of the courtiers. Chalais tells Maria about the letters and she says all is lost. Once again she tells him to flee through a secret passage, and he does, but tells her he will return if she does not follow him within an hour. Maria sings a prayer, Havvi un Dio che in sua clemenza.

The courtier gives the letter and portrait to Chevreuse and he is alternatively nostalgic and enraged. He confronts Maria and vows revenge. Suddenly Chalais returns for Maria through the secret passage. In a final trio Maria pleads for Chevreuse to kill her, Chalais says he doesn't fear death, and Chevreuse thunders that Chalais’s death is imminent. He gives Chalais a dueling pistol and the two race out. A shot is heard. Chevreuse returns and says Chalais has committed suicide. He throws the letter and portrait to the floor before Maria and cries out La morte a lui . . .La vita coll’infamia A te, donna infedel / "For him, death . . . For you, life with infamy, faithless woman".

Note: Donizetti wrote a culminating cabaletta for Maria, but crossed it out, preferring to end the opera in a distinctly non-bel canto, but highly dramatic manner.

== Recordings ==
Year	Cast (Maria, Riccardo Enrico Armando di Gondi)	Conductor, Opera House and Orchestra	Label
1962	Virginia Zeani, Enzo Tei, Mario Zanasi, Anna Maria Rota	Fernando Previtali, Orchestra & Chorus of Teatro San Carlo, Naples (Recorded at a live performance at San Carlo, Naples on 24 March)	Black Disk: Great Opera Performances; Cat: GOP 045/046
1974	Renata Scotto, Umberto Grilli, Renato Bruson, Elena Zilio	Gianandrea Gavazzeni, Orchestra & Chorus of Teatro La Fenice, Venice (recorded at a live performance at La Fenice, Venice on 26 March)	Audio CD: Opera D'Oro; Cat: OPD 1412
1988	Mariana Nicolesco, Giuseppe Morino, Paolo Coni, Francesca Franci	Massimo de Bernart, Orchestra Internazionale d'Italia Opera & Slovak Philharmonic Chorus of Bratislava (recorded at a live performance at Martina Franca, at the 14th Festival della Valle d'Itria, during August)	Audio CD: Nuova Era Records; Cat: 6732–6733
1996	Edita Gruberova, Octavio Arévalo, Ettore Kim, Ulrika Precht	Elio Boncompagni, Radio-Symphonieorchester Wien and Wiener Konzertchor (recorded at performances in the Konzerthaus, Vienna, on 6 and 12 December)	Audio CD: Nightingale; Cat: NC 070567-2
2009	Krassimira Stoyanova, José Bros, Christopher Purves, Loïc Félix	Sir Mark Elder, Orchestra of the Age of Enlightenment (recorded at Henry Wood Hall, London, October/November)	Audio CD: Opera Rara; Cat: ORC44
2011	Majella Cullagh, Salvatore Cordella, Marco Di Felice, Domenico Menini	Gregory Kunde, Orchestra and Chorus of the Bergamo Music Festival (Stage director: Roberto Recchia; recorded live, October, Teatro Donizetti)	DVD: Bongiovanni

== Bibliography ==
- Allitt, John Stewart (1991), Donizetti: in the light of Romanticism and the teaching of Johann Simon Mayr, Shaftesbury: Element Books, Ltd (UK); Rockport, MA: Element, Inc.(United States)
- Ashbrook, William (1982), Donizetti and His Operas, Cambridge University Press. ISBN 0-521-23526-X
- Ashbrook, William (1998), "Donizetti, Gaetano" in Stanley Sadie (Ed.), The New Grove Dictionary of Opera, Vol. One. London: MacMillan Publishers, Inc. ISBN 0-333-73432-7 ISBN 1-56159-228-5
- Ashbrook, William and Sarah Hibberd (2001), in Holden, Amanda (Ed.), The New Penguin Opera Guide, New York: Penguin Putnam. ISBN 0-14-029312-4. pp. 224 – 247.
- Black, John (1982), Donizetti’s Operas in Naples, 1822—1848. London: The Donizetti Society.
- Loewenberg, Alfred (1970). Annals of Opera, 1597-1940, 2nd edition. Rowman and Littlefield
- Osborne, Charles, (1994), The Bel Canto Operas of Rossini, Donizetti, and Bellini, Portland, Oregon: Amadeus Press. ISBN 0-931340-71-3
- Sadie, Stanley, (Ed.); John Tyrell (Exec. Ed.) (2004), The New Grove Dictionary of Music and Musicians. 2nd edition. London: Macmillan. ISBN 978-0-19-517067-2 (hardcover). ISBN 0-19-517067-9 OCLC 419285866 (eBook).
- Weinstock, Herbert (1963), Donizetti and the World of Opera in Italy, Paris, and Vienna in the First Half of the Nineteenth Century, New York: Pantheon Books. LCCN 63-13703
