= Alzira =

Alzira may refer to:

- Alzira (opera), an opera by Giuseppe Verdi
- Alzira, Valencia, a city in Spain, also known as Alcira
