= Luigia Abbadia =

Italian opera singer (1821–1896)

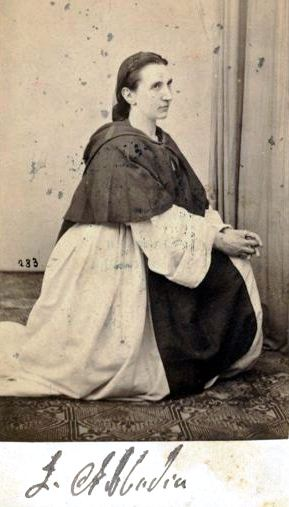
Luigia Abbadia

Luigia Abbadia (1 January 1821 – 1896) was an Italian operatic mezzo-soprano known for her fine voice, secure technique, and a strong temperament. Possessing an uncommonly wide range, Abbadia sang several roles traditionally portrayed by sopranos in addition to roles from the mezzo-soprano repertoire.

== Biography ==
Luigia Abbadia was born in Genoa on 1 January 1821. She was the daughter of composer Natale Abbadia. She studied music under her father and with the violinist Luigi Alberto Bianchi. She made her professional opera debut as Arsace in Rossini's Semiramide at Sassari in 1836. In 1838 she sang the role of Agnese de Maino in Bellini's Beatrice di Tenda in Mantua. After this she came under contract with opera impresario Bartolomeo Merelli. Over the next several years she appeared in operas throughout Italy, including performances in Novara, Brescia, Triest, Monza, Turin, Bologna, Padua and Piacenza.

In 1840 she sang the role of Corilla in Donizetti's Le convenienze ed inconvenienze teatrali in Vienna. In the autumn of 1840 she made her debut at La Scala as Rovena in Nicolai's Il templario; a role she had previously sung in that opera's world premiere at the Teatro Regio in Turin on 11 February 1840. On 5 September 1840 she originated the role of Giulietta di Kelbar in the world premiere of Verdi's Un giorno di regno at La Scala. She sang in two more world premieres at La Scala the following year; creating the roles of Delizia in Federico Ricci's Corrado d'Altamura on November 16, 1841 and Ines in Donizetti's Maria Padilla on 26 December 1841.

Her other roles at La Scala included Eleonora in Donizetti's Torquato Tasso, Elvira in Ernani, Emilia in Mercadante's La vestale, Marie in La fille du régiment, and the title roles in Donizetti's Alina, regina di Golconda and Pacini's Saffo. Other highlights of her stage career included portrayals of Alisa in Donizetti's Lucia di Lammermoor, Angelina in Rossini's La Cenerentola, Arsace in Rossini's Semiramide, and Normanno in Mercadante's I Normanni a Parigi.

In 1860–61, Abbadia participated in a tour of Germany with the opera company of Achille Lorini which included performances in Berlin and Hamburg among other cities. After retiring from the stage in 1870 she established a singing school in Milan. Several of her pupils went on to have successful opera careers including mezzo-soprano Giuseppina Pasqua and tenor Giovanni Battista De Negri.
