= Guglielmo Ratcliff =

Opera by Pietro Mascagni

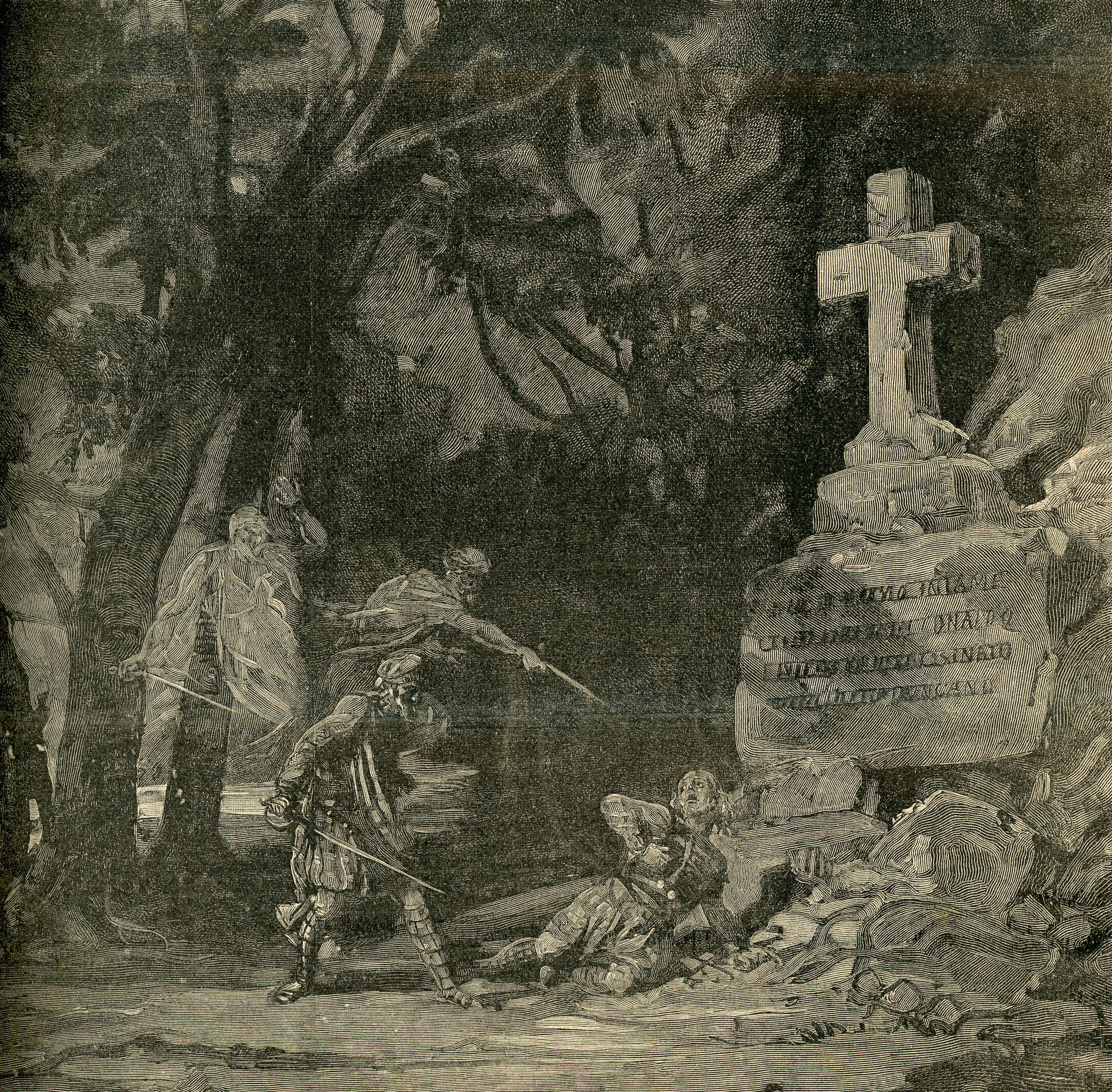
Act III, scene 2 as depicted in L’illustrazione popolare, 1895

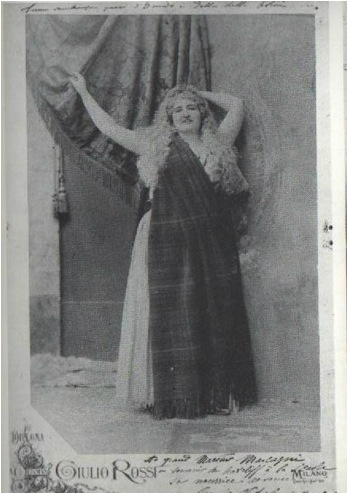
Renata Vidal as Margherita, 1895

Guglielmo Ratcliff is a tragic opera in four acts by Pietro Mascagni to an Italian libretto by Andrea Maffei, translated from the German play Wilhelm Ratcliff (1822) by Heinrich Heine. Mascagni had substantially finished the composition of Ratcliff before the success of his first opera, Cavalleria rusticana. After the composition and performance of further operas L'amico Fritz in 1891 and I Rantzau in 1893, Ratcliff eventually premiered on 16 February 1895 at the Teatro alla Scala in Milan and has been revived a number of times since, including a concert performance in 2003 at the Alice Tully Hall in New York and a staged performance at Wexford Festival Opera in 2015, conducted by Francesco Cilluffo.

Mascagni often wrote that Ratcliff was his best opera. However, it has not entered the standard operatic repertoire, in part because the title role is one of the most taxing tenor parts ever written. It is especially known for its act 3 Intermezzo, which features prominently in the Martin Scorsese film Raging Bull. (Heine's play, which was never performed during his life, was also used as the basis for César Cui's 1869 opera of the same name and for Volkmar Andreae's 1914 opera Ratcliff.)

== Roles ==
Roles, voice types, premiere cast
| Role | Voice type | Premiere cast, 16 February 1895 Conductor: Pietro Mascagni |
|---|---|---|
| Guglielmo Ratcliff | tenor | Giovanni Battista De Negri |
| Maria | soprano | Adelina Stehle |
| Count Douglas, betrothed to Maria | baritone | Giuseppe Pacini |
| Margherita, Maria's nurse | mezzo-soprano | Della Rogers (Note: Renata Vidal was originally scheduled to sing the role and sang it in subsequent performances in the opening run, but was indisposed on the opening night. See Venturi.) |
| MacGregor, a Scottish lord, Maria's father | bass | Giuseppe De Grazia |
| Lesley, Ratcliff's friend | tenor | Gaetano Matteo Mazzanti |
| Tom, an innkeeper | bass | Giovanni Scarneo |
| Willie, Tom's young son | contralto | Armida Parsi-Pettinella |
| Robin, a thief | bass | Raffaele Terzi |
| Dick, a thief | tenor | Aristide Masiero |
| Bell, a thief | baritone | G. Calvi |
| John, a thief | bass | Giuseppe Rosci |
| Taddie, a thief | tenor | Giovanni Francesco Fabbri |
| A servant | tenor | A. Degani |

== Synopsis ==
Place: The North of Scotland
Time: Early 19th century

=== Act 1 ===
Count Douglas, Maria's betrothed, arrives at the Castle of Maria and her father MacGregor. He tells them how he was attacked by bandits near the castle but saved by an unknown knight. Maria faints, and then recovers. MacGregor tells Douglas about Gugliemo Ratcliff, whom Maria had rejected as a suitor. Ratcliff's revenge was to challenge her next two suitors to duels in which he killed them. Count Douglas then receives a message from Ratcliff delivered by his friend Lesley challenging him to a similar duel at Black Rock.

=== Act 2 ===
In an inn frequented by thieves and swindlers, the innkeeper Tom, is holding his son, Willie on his knees. When he asks the child to recite the Pater Noster, he repeatedly stumbles on the line "And lead us not into temptation". Tom grows increasingly angry with the boy, tells him that he will end up like the clientele of the inn, and eventually sends him from the room. Ratcliff then tells Lesley how Maria's rejection of him led to his compulsion to kill any man who succeeded in winning her love. Ratcliff is disturbed by the appearance of strange figures who, unbeknownst to him, are the ghosts of Maria's dead suitors.

=== Act 3 ===
Douglas arrives at Black Rock for his duel with Ratcliff. The two strange figures who have been following Ratcliff briefly appear and then disappear. When Ratcliff arrives, Douglas realises that he is the knight who had saved him from the bandits, and when he gets the better of Ratcliff in the duel refuses to kill him. Ratcliff is left lying on the ground where he is again visited by the ghostly figures.

=== Act 4 ===
In her room, Maria is preparing for her wedding to Douglas. Her nurse, Margherita, tells Maria the story of her mother Elisa's death. Before she married MacGregor, Elisa had been in love with Edward, Guglielmo Ratcliff's father, but both married others. Edward and Elisa later realised their mistake and became lovers. When MacGregor found out, he murdered Edward, and Elisa died from grief. Gugliemo Ratcliff then bursts into Maria's room covered in blood from his unsuccessful duel with Douglas and begs Maria to run away with him. With her mother's story still on her mind and thinking that she might be making the same mistake, Maria at first feels pity for Guglielmo, but then asks him to leave. Her refusal drives Guglielmo mad. He kills both Maria and her father who rushes into the room after hearing her calls for help. Ratcliff then commits suicide. The opera ends with his dying words "O Maria, vengo a te! Son qui, soave Maria!" (Oh Maria, I'm coming to you. I'm here my sweet Maria!).
