= Giovanni Battista De Negri =

Italian opera singer (1851–1924)

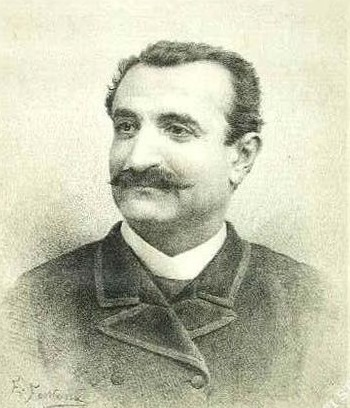
- Portrait of De Negri by Ernesto Fontana
- Born: 30 July 1851; Alessandria, Italy
- Died: 3 April 1924 (aged 72); Nizza Monferrato, Italy
- Known for: Opera singer (tenor)

Giovanni Battista De Negri (30 July 1851 – 3 April 1924) (Note: The dates and places for De Negri's birth and death are from his entry in the Dizionario Biografico degli Italiani. However, there is considerable variation in the sources. For example, Kutsch and Riemens give the year and place of death as "1923 Turin" as does Celletti who in addition gives the birth year as 1850.) was an Italian operatic tenor particularly known for his portrayal of the title roles in Wagner's Tannhäuser and Verdi's Otello. In 1895, he created the title role in Mascagni's Guglielmo Ratcliff.

== Life and career ==
De Negri was born in Alessandria, Piedmont, Italy. In 1873, he began studying singing, first in his native city with Carlo Guasco and then in Milan with Luigia Abbadia. He made his debut on 26 December 1876 at the Teatro Sociale in Bergamo in Filippo Sangiorgi's opera Diana di Chaverny and the following month appeared there to great success in the title role of Donizetti's Poliuto.

In 1878 De Negri was contracted by the Croatian National Theatre in Zagreb where he sang numerous leading roles in operas by Verdi, Bellini, Donizetti, and Meyerbeer, as well as appearing in the world premiere of Ivan Zajc's Lizinka. While appearing in Zagreb he met his future wife Baroness Fanny Scotti, a pianist. They married three years later in Vienna and had one daughter, Margot, who later became an opera singer. Up until 1882, De Negri sang primarily in Zagreb, Trieste and Budapest.

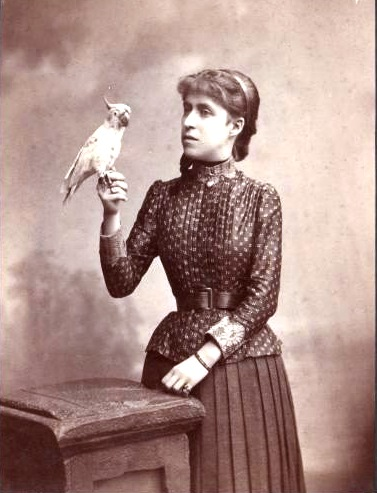
De Negri's wife Fanny Scotti c. 1885

On his return to Italy, he was increasingly in demand in the major opera houses appearing in leading tenor roles at the Teatro San Carlo in La traviata and Lucrezia Borgia; at La Fenice in Le prophète, La Gioconda; at the Teatro Regio di Torino in Il duca d'Alba and La Juive; and at La Scala in Simon Boccanegra. He returned to the Teatro Regio in the 1887–88 season where he scored a considerable triumph in Verdi's Otello. It was to become one of his signature roles. At the time he was considered Tamagno's chief rival in the role, and his portrayal was particularly praised by Verdi. According to Rodolfo Celletti, De Negri may have lacked the ringing tone found in Tamagno's high notes but was superior to him in his diction, phrasing, and acting skills. Between 1888 and 1894 he sang the role throughout Italy and abroad. He sang it at La Scala in the 1891–92 season, where he created the title role in Gomes' Condor, and also made his role debut in Tannhäuser. In 1895, he returned to La Scala to sing the title role of Mascagni's Guglielmo Ratcliff in its world premiere.

By 1896, the assumption of multiple taxing dramatic tenor roles and a frenetic performance schedule took a toll on De Negri's voice. He underwent a series of throat operations in 1897 which had little success, and he retired from the stage the following year. His final performances were in the title roles of Tannhäuser and Samson et Dalila at the Teatro Verdi in Trieste after which he taught singing in Turin. With the arrival of the phonograph he came out of retirement briefly to record arias from Otello and Norma for Zonophone in 1902. His Zonophone recording of "Niun mi tema" from Otello is also preserved on the CD A survey of Zonophone recordings 1901-1903 (Symposium Records, 2004). De Negri died in Turin at the age of 72.
