= L'assedio di Calais =

Opera by Gaetano Donizetti

- Opera by Gaetano Donizetti
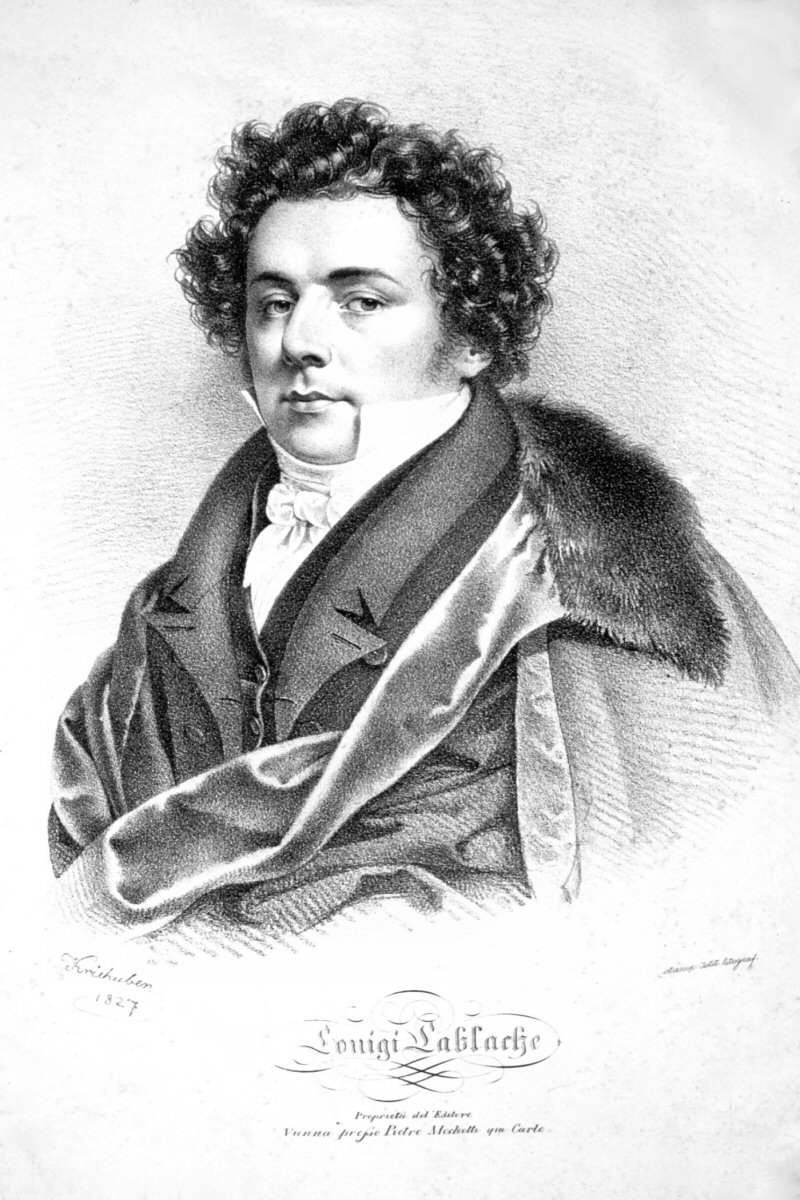
- Luigi Lablache, who portrayed Edward III
- Librettist: Salvatore Cammarano
- Language: Italian
- Based on: Luigi Marchionni's L'assedio di Calais
- Premiere: 18 November 1836; Teatro San Carlo, Naples

L'assedio di Calais (The siege of Calais) is an 1836 melodramma lirico, or opera, in three acts by Gaetano Donizetti, his 49th opera. Salvatore Cammarano wrote the Italian libretto, which has been described as "...a remarkable libretto, the closest Cammarano ever got to real poetry, particularly in his description of the embattled city and the heartfelt pride of its citizens". It was based on Luigi Marchionni's play L'assedio di Calais (also called Edoardo III), which had been presented in Naples around 1825, and secondarily on Luigi Henry's ballet L'assedio di Calais, which had been performed in Naples in 1828 and revived in 1835.

Both of these were probably derived from the French play Eustache de St Pierre, ou Le siège de Calais by Hubert (pen name of Philippe-Jacques Laroche), which had been given in Paris in 1822 and was in turn taken from the 1765 play Le siège de Calais by Pierre-Laurent Buirette de Belloy. The historical basis was Edward III's siege of Calais in 1346, toward the beginning of the Hundred Years' War.

The opera was premiered on 19 November 1836 at the Teatro San Carlo in Naples. It was dedicated to the Queen Mother, Maria Isabella. It was the thirteenth of the composer's operas to be given its premiere in that house and it immediately followed the previous year's successful Lucia di Lammermoor there. L'assedio received sixteen performances that season, and, since the opera "met the requirements for a royal occasion, with its happy ending, and had an additional bonus in its glorification of the part played by the English queen, Donizetti duly received the King's congratulations".

By 1840 it had disappeared from the world's stages and it did not re-appear until 1990 at the Donizetti Festival in Bergamo.

== Composition history ==
=== Interest in composing for the Paris Opera ===
Following Donizetti's visit to Paris in March 1835 (for his Marino Faliero at the Théâtre-Italien), it is clear that he wished to return to that city and to write an opera for presentation at the Paris Opéra, "the most prestigious theatre in the world".

Also, given that there was an established tradition of works which demonstrated French solidity and resistance in the face of overwhelming odds, all of the plays and the ballet noted above as being used as libretto sources (and which were incorporated into or consulted by Cammarano for the preparation of the libretto) reinforced that tradition in Donizetti's mind. Therefore, as the preparations for this opera evolved over the unusually long period of five months, it has been noted that everything stresses the importance to the composer of his long-term plan for achieving his ultimate goal: having an opera accepted and produced by the Paris Opéra. Thus, L'assedio became Donizetti's first experiment in the style of French grand opera.

=== Conventions of grand opera ===
As part of that tradition, L'assedio included a ballet divertissement, a key ingredient of French opera of the period. The idea for this may have arisen in Donizetti's mind from a revival of Luigi Henry's ballet at the San Carlo in 1835, right at the time that Lucia di Lammermoor was given its premiere, but including this dance form was unusual in Italy, where a ballet was normally performed only as a separate work alongside an opera on a double bill.

In line with another French tradition was the composer's rejection of the Italian concept of the prime role of the "prima donna": firstly his having "no particular feeling of obligation to give the heroine an entrance aria" and, secondly, accepting that her role was of significance at all; the opera's plot "makes female roles secondary in importance".

Another of the French traditions, as developed from the dominant force in French dramatic literature and personified by Eugene Scribe's concept of the "well-made play" (which may be seen in many of the opera libretti he wrote), concerns the notion of a "coup de theatre" whereby some extraordinary action occurs to turn the evolution of the story totally on its head. This is certainly the case with L'assedio.

As it turned out, Donizetti had to wait four more years for one of his operas to be staged in Paris.

=== Composing for particular singers ===
But, in direct contradiction to the French tradition, Donizetti found himself having to employ the "old-fashioned Italian convention of the musico", the female singer trouser role which musicologist William Ashbrook states was defined by the composer to mean "a male-hero role intended to be sung by a female contralto". When contacts with a favourite tenor with local audiences in Naples, Giovanni Basadonna, were fruitless and when the composer did not consider any of three available primo tenors good enough for the part("almost useless", he calls them), he created a trouser role in the Rossinian tradition of Tancredi (from the opera Tancredi) or Arsace (in Semiramide). Therefore, the leading male role of Aurelio in L'assedio, while written for a contralto, is most often performed by a mezzo-soprano.

== Performance history ==
=== Premiere and first revival ===
The opera was enthusiastically received at its official opening on 22 November, the run of performances were poorly attended due to a cholera epidemic affecting the city, as well as many parts of Northern and Southern Italy.

Though Donizetti called it "my most carefully worked out score", he wrote that "the third act is the least successful....Who knows, I might retouch it?" In another letter to "Dolci di Bergamo" on the same day he wrote: "The third act...seems to me to produce less effect because the dances slow down the action, and perhaps I will cut them to make the opera more effective..."

Generally regarded as the weakest, act 3 contains four "engagingly noisy" dances during a scene celebrating the Queen's arrival. Two of these were by Antonio Vaccari, and, according to Charles Osborne, the two by Donizetti are "instantly forgettable".

By the end of its initial run in 1836, there had been 15 performances, all of which "invariably included act 3". But it appears that, for the July 1837 performances, changes had been made because the Naples Superintendent of Theatres complained of unauthorized alterations. Donizetti had tried to strengthen act 3 by removing the ballet and the choral finale and adding a more traditional aria-finale rondo for Eleonora instead: Questo pianto che sul ciglio, E l'eccesso del contento / "These tears on my lashes, Are tears of overwhelming joy". (This rondo is included in the Opera Rara recording.) But in spite of this change, Donizetti was unsatisfied with the result, but it appears that he made no other revisions before leaving Naples.

The revival on 6 July included only acts 1 and 2. A performance on 8 July 1837 replaced act 3 with another composer's ballet. After three more performances in 1838 and none in 1839, a final performance on 4 February 1840 is thought to have included only the first two acts. After a total of thirty-eight performances in Naples, L'assedio "dropped out of sight". It was only one of a few of Donizetti's "mature operas which appear never to have been performed elsewhere after their first runs".

=== Donizetti aims for Paris ===
In an attempt to have the work staged at the Paris Opéra, Donizetti wrote a letter on 21 May 1837 to that company's new star tenor Gilbert Duprez who had recently returned to Paris after eight years in Italy and who had starred in Lucia di Lammermoor two years earlier. Donizetti wrote that he had written the opera "in accordance with French taste", his offer was ignored and L'assedio was not performed in Paris.

=== Modern revivals ===
The opera was recorded in London by Opera Rara in 1988 in its three-act version. The first modern stage revival was presented by the Donizetti Festival at the Teatro Donizetti in Bergamo in September 1990. At the Wexford Festival Opera in Ireland in October 1991 the three-act version was also given. L'assedio was given its London stage premiere by the Guildhall School of Music and Drama on 3 March 1992 and the first performance in Scotland was given in Glasgow by RSAMD (now the Royal Conservatoire of Scotland) at the New Athenaeum Theatre on 27 June 1998.

The English Touring Opera gave a series of performances across England and into Scotland between March and May 2013, which would appear to be the opera's UK professional premiere.

ETO presented the opera in a two-act version by incorporating some of act 3 into acts 1 and 2, for which there is 19th-century precedent. The production's director, James Conway explained:

Some of Cammarano's text was censored, and neutralised. The queen is a triffling role, and Edoardo's conversion is not credible. Much of the music is not the same unwavering standard of the first two acts. In Donizetti's lifetime the opera was often given without a third act, and there is evidence that a revised version, without ballet music and without the English queen, was performed at Naples to the librettist's chagrin.

The opera was given its first US professional staging at the Glimmerglass Festival in 2017 and the complete three act version was seen in a production by Odyssey Opera, Boston, the same year.

== Roles ==
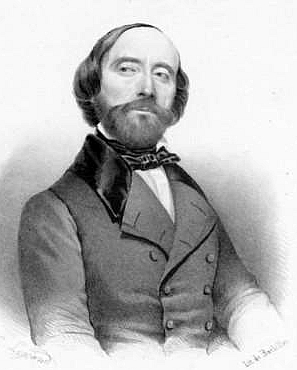
Paul Barroilhet, who sang the role of Eustachio

| Role | Voice type | Premiere Cast, 19 November 1836 (Conductor: - ) |
|---|---|---|
| Eustachio de Saint-Pierre, Mayor of Calais | baritone | Paul Barroilhet |
| Aurelio, his son | mezzo-soprano, pants role | Almareinda Manzocchi |
| Eleonora, Aurelio's wife | soprano | Caterina Barilli-Patti, mother of Adelina Patti |
| Giovanni d'Aire, burgher | tenor | Ferdinando Cimino |
| Giacomo de Wisants, burgher | tenor | Freni |
| Pietro de Wisants, burgher | baritone | Giovanni Revalden |
| Armando, burgher | bass | Giuseppe Benedetti |
| Eduardo III, King of England | baritone | Luigi Lablache |
| Isabella, Queen of England | soprano | |
| Edmundo, English general | tenor | Nicola Tucci |
| An English spy / Un Incognito | bass | Pietro Gianni |

== Synopsis ==
(Source: the action described is taken from the events portrayed in the Opera Rara recording from 1988. Variations are noted in indented brackets.)

Time: 1347
Place: Calais, France.

=== Act 1 ===
Scene 1: Outside the walls of Calais at night

While the English soldiers besieging the city are asleep, Aurelio climbs down from the city walls, steals some loaves of bread, and attempts to climb back up to the top. But when one of the soldiers is disturbed by the sounds he is making, all come awake and immediately take chase. In an opening chorus, they describe how he escapes by leaping into the sea and swimming away.

[In one revised libretto where act 3 is removed (as noted below) and a few lines of linking recitative added, the King appears outside the city walls and sings his aria L'avvenir per me fia tutto, Un trionfo, una vittoria / "Every obstacle to my glory, Is overcome at last!".

For its 2013 performances of the work, English Touring Opera performed this version. Its on-line synopsis describes the action as follows:

Edoardo, leader of the besieging army, is impatient for victory over the city’s defenders. He knows that he must take the city to win the campaign and enhance his own reputation. He exhorts his lieutenant Edmondo to demand hostages in exchange for sparing the city’s complete destruction. Edmondo says that this strategy is in motion.]

Scene 2: Inside the Municipal Palace of Calais

Aurelio's father, Eustachio, the Mayor of Calais, is unhappy. He sadly comments on the condition of the people inside the walls and their lamentations: "Help, food, hope....everything / Is lost to us except love of our country". Further, he states that he has not seen his son. Eleonora, Aurelio's wife, enters exclaiming that all is lost: his son, her husband has been seen trying to escape from the English in a hail of arrows and she fears that he has not survived. Eustachio is in despair (Cantabile: Le fibre, oh Dio! m'investe / Orrida man di gelo! / "A dreadful icy hand, oh God, assails my flesh") and Eleonora joins in a duet in which both express their fears.

However, Giovanni rushes in with the news that all is well: Aurelio has been saved. Both father and wife express their joy (Cabaletta: Eustachio, then Eleonora, then both: Un instante i mali obblio / Dell' orrenda e lunga guerra!... / "In one moment I forgot the troubles / Of the long, horrendous war!"). Pietro enters to confirm that Aurelio is safe but is changing his clothes. His wife demands that he be brought to her and, when Aurelio arrives he brings with him their young son, Filippo. There is a great reunion of all four: (Aurelio's Aria di sortita: cantabile: Al mio cor oggetti amati / Vi congiunga un solo amplesso... / "Let me hold to my heart / All my dearest in one embrace"). Overcoming tears, Aurelio is questioned as to the chances of survival. He turns to the problems at hand, fiercely proclaiming that there is nothing that can be done to survive the English attack except by fighting to the end: (Cabaletta: Aureilo, then ensemble: Giovanni, Eleanora, Eustachio; Aurelio repeats, then all: Giammai del forte l'ardir non langue / "The audacity of the strong never languishes").

The group bemoans its fate, knowing that Edward III plans on total control of the city, but no sooner than Giovanni leaves to take care of the damage to the city walls, than he rushes back in to announce that the city's population has rebelled. The people are heard calling for Eustachio's death, and the Stranger enters pointing him out to the crowd. Boldly, Eustachio holds his ground and defiantly bears his chest to them while all look on: (Eustachio; Che s'indugia? In questo petto / "What stops you"; then ensemble: three groups: Aurelio/Eleonora/Giovanni/Armando/Giocomo/Pietro together: Gente ingrata, non è questi, il tuo padre il tuo sostegno? / "Ingrates, has not this man been Father and provider to you?"), the Stranger: (Non previsto e fero inciampo / "An unforeseen and iron obstacle thwarts my plan..."), and the People: (A quel sensi, a quell'aspetto, Più lo sdegno non m'invade / "Those sentiments, that bearing...I am moved by anger no longer..."). Persistent, the Stranger attempts to persuade the crowd to act, but Eustachio sees through him and demands proof of his identity proclaiming that he is an Englishman. With no Frenchman coming forward to vouch for him, the Stranger tears into Eustachio, but is restrained. Eustachio proclaims that all will go out to fight the English and the crowd asks for forgiveness. In a massive choral finale, all are resigned to their separate fates as the soldiers move out, the women move inside, and the Stranger is dragged off.

=== Act 2 ===
Scene 1: Aurelio and Eleonora's quarters

While Aurelio and his son sleep, Eleanore watches over them. Aware of the impending siege, she prays for some brief comfort: (Breve riposo a lui concde il sonno / "May sleep grant a short rest"). Waking suddenly from a bad dream, Aurelio is startled and he describes it, telling that his son was captured and killed by English soldiers before his eyes. (Duet: first Aurelio: Io l'udia chiarmarmi a nome / "In his sobs and terror...", then Eleonora: Rio presagio!...amato figlio / "An evil omen!...my beloved son"; then together). A bell rings, appearing to summoning Aurelio to the fight, but at that moment (In a tempo di mezzo) Giovanni arrives to announce that the English king wishes to discuss terms, and he encourages Aurelio to gather with the other leaders. (Cabaletta: Aurelio and Eleonora: La speme a dolci palpito, mi ridestò nel seno... / "Hope round sweet expectation, In my breast"). Aurelio rushes out.

Scene 2: An official public gathering place inside the city

The people cry out in despair demanding "Pray! save what is let of this oppressed city" The King's herald, Edmondo, states that there will be a truce, but on the condition that six nobles from Calais go outside the walls where they will be sacrificed.

All are horrified and express their anger, with Eustachio declaring that all will remain Frenchmen. Aurelio angrily turns on Edmondo: (Aria: Esci, e sappi chi t'invta / "Go, and tell him who sends you, Of our hatred of his terms"), but Eustachio demands that protests stop and he informs the Herald that, before sunset, "the six victims will be brought to the English king" and, over all the protests, he prevails by declaring that he will be first. He signs his name to a paper. Although Aurelio attempts to do likewise, his father prevents him as others step forward and add their names to the list, but finally Aurelio is able to add his name. The group of six is formed: as the sun begins to set, they are ready to go, and they say their farewells: (Sextet, then all: O sccra polva, o suol natio / "Oh treasured soil, our homeland") with the townspeople lamenting the fate of their comrades.

[The following is taken from act 3 in the ETO revised performance version, Aurelio attempts to hold back his tears as he says goodbye to his young son and to Eleonora, but he finally breaks down with his son in his arms: (Aurelio: Raddopia i baci tuoi, Parte di me piu cara... / "Dearest part of me, Kiss me again and again..."); then Eleonora, Eustachio, and the hostages all join together in the finale.]

=== Act 3 ===
[In the ETO revised version, almost all of what follows below is removed, except that Aurelio's Raddopia i baci tuoi and the lament by all (except the queen, who has been removed) is moved to become the ending of the opera.]

Scene 1: The English camp outside the gates

King Edward demands that when his queen arrives, she be greeted with a salute, but he is uncertain as to the whereabouts of his herald and whether the French have agreed to his plan. When Edmondo arrives to tell him that the French will be sending the six men, Edward is delighted, for he sees himself as finally ruling England, Scotland and France: (Aria: L'avvenir per me fia tutto, Un trionfo, una vittoria / "Every obstacle to my glory, Is overcome at last!").

[See act 1 for how Edward's aria was relocated there in a revised version]

Queen Isabella arrives, but immediately expresses astonishment at not meeting her husband inside the walls of Calais. However, the king praises her accomplishments in her involvement with the pacification of Scotland. Before the assembled group, dancers perform in celebration of Queen Isabella's victory:

"Dances of the Scottish prisoners" (composed by Donizetti)
"Passo d'ansiemi" (composed by Antonio Vaccaro)

[A revised version shortens the act into one scene by removing the ballets as well as the role of the queen]

Edmondo advises the king that the six hostages have arrived. He orders that they be taken to his tent and, in a quiet aside to his men, that a scaffold be prepared.

Scene 2: Inside King Edward's tent

[The revision noted above removes the change of scene which remains as in scene 1, outside the city walls]

The condemned men approach, led by Eustachio who hands over the keys of Calais to the king; he declares that they serve as an example to the others, but Eustachio stands firm declaring that a glorious death is waiting. Just then, there is noise from outside and Eleonora is heard addressing the townspeople. As Edoardo attempts to have his men remove the relatives of the victims who have gathered outside, Queen Isabella hurries in, having heard the orders. Along with the victims and their families, she pleads with her husband, but, with the king's stolid rejections, Eustachio steps forward to declare that the six must now accept their fate and say their farewells to their families. Aurelio attempts to hold back his tears as he says goodbye to his young son and to Eleonora, but he finally breaks down with his son in his arms: (Aurelio: Raddopia i baci tuoi, Parte di me piu cara... / "Dearest part of me, Kiss me again and again..."; then Eleonora, Eustachio, and the hostages; then the queen - all join together). Even the king begins to be moved to pity, and as the condemned turn to accept their fate, Isabella demands that they stop. She turns to Edward: (Di re figlia, vincitrice, Io mi postro / "As a King's daughter, as a victor, I prostrate myself before you..."); the English officers join in her pleading; and finally Edoardo is convinced to pardon the six men. All is joyful: a great chorus of all assembled sing their praises of the king's actions, declaring that his memory will live forever: Fin che i secoli vivranno, Le tue laudi un eco avranno / "As long as the centuries go on, Your praises will echo through them").

[In a later version, Donizetti added a rondo finale for Eleonora: S'il mio cor soavi effetti / "Let these tears express to you".

== Music ==
Conventions of ottocento music drama

As a general summary of the quality of the music of this opera, William Ashbrook notes in his 1989 analysis:

Although not without flaws, L'assedio di Calais, contains some of the most attractive and genuinely moving music that Donizetti ever composed. It shows him tackling a new kind of subject matter - sacrificial patriotism - and treating it, particularly in the finale to Act 2, with dramatic immediacy that was his strongest suit as a man of the theatre.....In many important ways, such as the eloquent portrait of Eustachio and the cumulative effect of many of the fine ensemble passages, L'assedio is very much a forward-looking opera for 1836.

Known as the solita forma, the conventions of bel canto scene layout and double-aria structure are clearly in evidence throughout the work. In this regard, Osborne praises the mastery exhibited in Donizetti and Cammarano's collaborations, but singles out the act 1 "sorrowful duet, Le fibre, oh Dio, m'investe!, for Eustachio and Eleonora, with its joyous cabaletta (Un instante i mali obblio")...as "a fine example of the confidently established form" of that time.

However, Ashbrook notes that the opening of the opera is very unlike any of his other works, since he has to parallel the mimed stage action - as Aurelio climbs down from the walls to steal bread from the English. Here the music parallels that action and "moves away from creating a generalised impression of mood.....in order to seek dramatic novelty and effectiveness"

Also, as was seen in much of the music for the previous year's Maria Stuarda, there was a growing tendency for greater ensemble work, a single aria becoming a duet, then an ensemble. In act 1, scene 2 that is clearly seen as the music moves from Eustachio (Che s'indugia? In questo petto / "What stops you") to the group with Aurelio and his men (Plebe ingrata) then to the Stranger (Non previsto e ferro inciampo), and finally to the assembled people (A quel sensi).

=== Revisions to act 3 after 1836 ===
As the composer recognized very early on, the weaknesses of act 3 prompted him to feel that he would return to modify or re-write this act. However, while it does not seem that he did very much, there were changes made in at least one revised libretto, and some of these were quite possibly staged. (see "Reactions to the premiere" above).

Of the changes made, it is known that:

- Donizetti shortened the entire act into one scene by doing three things, states William Ashbrook: he removed the ballets as well as the queen's role and he added a rondo finale for Eleonora, S'il mio cor soavi effetti, (which is noted above as appearing as an appendix in the Opera Rara recording) and which, he speculates, might have caused a later prima donna soprano to find the role in the opera more appealing had it been performed. However, Osborne regards the loss of the final ensemble and the addition of Eleonora's cabaletta as "not an improvement upon (Donizetti's) first thoughts."
- Specific areas of the libretto show these changes says John Black, in his notes for the Opera Rara recording. He also speculates that they may have been performed in Naples during the 1937 and later revivals and were the reason for the Superintendent's concerns, hence the Naples record showing only two acts being performed on more than one occasion.
- King Edward's aria in act 3, scene 1, (L'avvenir per me fia tutto, Un trionfo, una vittoria / "Every obstacle to my glory, Is overcome at last!"), was placed right at the beginning of act 1 when the king was "visiting his outposts". By making some changes to the libretto to work with the dramatic situation, it would have simplified the act - the only one in which the king appears - although Black is doubtful that this change was ever performed. However, Black proposes that it is authentic because in one source for the original libretto, Luigi Henry's ballet L'assedio di Calais, this very event occurs. Also, it is known that the composer saw this ballet in 1835 when it was re-staged in Naples at the time he was preparing Lucia di Lammermoor. This may have given him the idea for the subject of this opera.

However, what is not known is exactly who was responsible for these changes to the libretto although, after the initial performances, it was common practice "once the first performance was safely out of the way". But they were not done by Cammarano, who scribbled some disparaging comments in the margin of at least one revised libretto. These kinds of changes, along with frequent performances of separate acts at Naples at that time, add to the mystery.

Under its translated title The Siege of Calais, this rarity is being produced by two U.S. companies within months of each other in 2017. The Glimmerglass Festival in Cooperstown, NY will perform it several times during the summer, while Boston's Odyssey Opera will give two performances in late October as part of a season of five works devoted to the Hundred Years' War, four of them centered on Joan of Arc.

== Recordings ==
| Year | Cast: Eustachio, Aurelio, Eleonora, Giovanni d'Aire, Stranger/Un Incognito King Edward III Queen Isabella | Conductor, Opera House and Orchestra | Label |
|---|---|---|---|
| 1988 | Christian du Plessis, Della Jones, Nuccia Focile, Rico Serbo, Norman Bailey, Russell Smythe; Eiddwen Harrhy | David Parry, Philharmonia Orchestra and Geoffrey Mitchell Choir | CD: Opera Rara, Cat: ORC9 |
| 1990 | Paolo Coni, Luciana D' Intino, Nuccia Focile, Romano Emili, Maurizio Antonelli, Michele Pertusi, Barbara Frittoli | Roberto Abbado, Orchestra and Chorus of RAI Milano, (Recording of a performance in the Civico Teatro; Gaetano Donizetti, Bergamo, 20 September) | DVD: House of Opera, Cat: DVDCC 177 |
