= Armida Parsi-Pettinella =

Italian mezzo-soprano opera singer

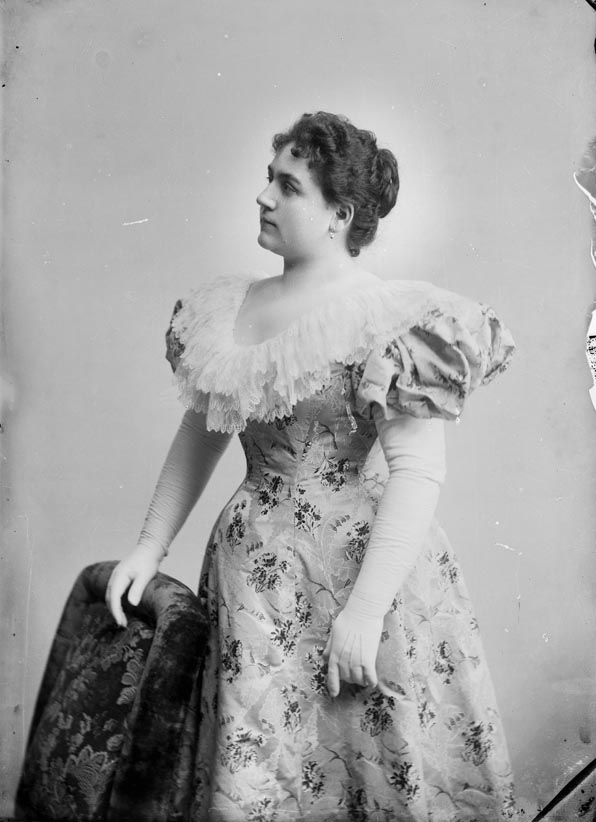
Armida Parsi-Pettinella

Armida Parsi-Pettinella (1868–1949) was an Italian mezzo-soprano who is remembered for her performances in Italy, especially from 1895 at La Scala, where she was repeatedly successful in the title role of Samson et Dalila until 1910. She also performed in Paris, Madrid, Buenos Aires and Monte-Carlo.

== Biography ==
Born in Gallese on 30 August 1868, she debuted in 1895 as Willie in Pietro Mascagni's Guglielmo Ratcliff. The same year, at La Scala, she played Anne Boleyn in Saint-Saëns' Henry VIII, while in 1896 she played Dalila in Saint-Saëns' Samson et Dalila, Margherita in Ratcliff and Gertrude in Ambroise Thomas' Hamlet at the same theatre.

She made a guest appearance in 1896 at the Academy of Music in New York as Madelon in Giordano's Andrea Chénier. In 1897, she sang in Lisbon at the Teatro Nacional de São Carlos where she appeared as Ortuda in Lohengrin and Azucena in Il trovatore. In 1903, she returned to Italy where she married Riccardo Pettinella, a Milan conductor and voice teacher, using the name Parsi-Pettinella for her performances at La Scala. In February 1903, she performed Loretta in Alberto Franchetti's Asrael with Arturo Toscanini conducting. On 11 March, she appeared as Ulrica in Verdi's Un ballo in maschera, also under Toscanini. From 1904 to 1909, she appeared in Buenos Aires, Montevideo and Madrid.

Armida Parsi-Pettinella died in Milan on 9 January 1949 at the Casa di Riposo per Musicisti founded by Giuseppe Verdi for retired opera singers. Recordings are available of a variety of her operatic contributions.
