= Natale Abbadia =

Italian composer (1792–1861)

- Born: 11 March 1792; Genoa, Republic of Genoa
- Died: 25 December 1861 (aged 69); Milan
- Education: Genoa Conservatory
- Occupation(s): composer, harpsichordist, and conductor

Natale Abbadia (11 March 1792 – 25 December 1861) was an Italian composer, harpsichordist, and conductor. Born in Genoa, Italy, he studied music at the Genoa Conservatory.

From 1831 to 1837, he taught singing in his native city and was a conductor at the Teatro Carlo Felice. He later taught singing in Milan. One of his pupils was his daughter, Luigia Abbadia, who had a successful career as an opera singer.

As a composer, Natale Abbadia wrote music for the theatre and for the church. He composed the opera Giannina di Pontieu (1812), the musical farce L'imbroglione ed il castigamatti, and several masses, motets, and other religious music. He died in Milan at the age of 69.
