= Giuseppina Pasqua =

Italian opera singer (1851–1930)

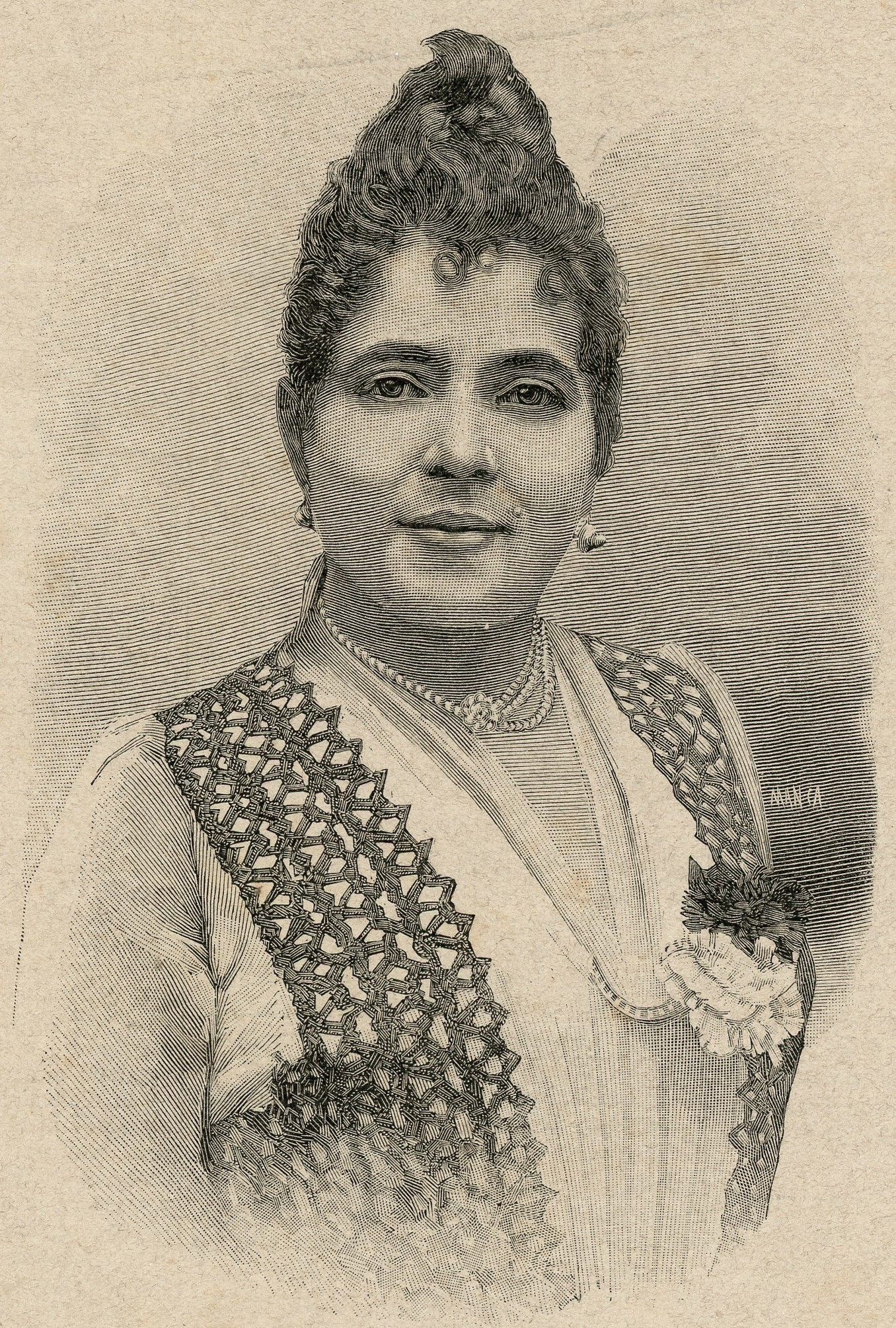
Giuseppina Pasqua in an 1893 engraving

Giuseppina Pasqua (24 October 1855 – 24 February 1930) was an Italian opera singer who performed throughout Italy and Europe from the late 1860s through the early 1900s. She began her career as a soprano when she was only 13, but later retrained her voice as a mezzo-soprano. She sang in several world premieres, but is most remembered today for having created the role of Mistress Quickly in Giuseppe Verdi's Falstaff. The composer wrote the role specifically for her and dedicated the act 2 aria "Giunta all' albergo" to Pasqua. She was married to the baritone Astorre Giacomelli.

== Biography ==
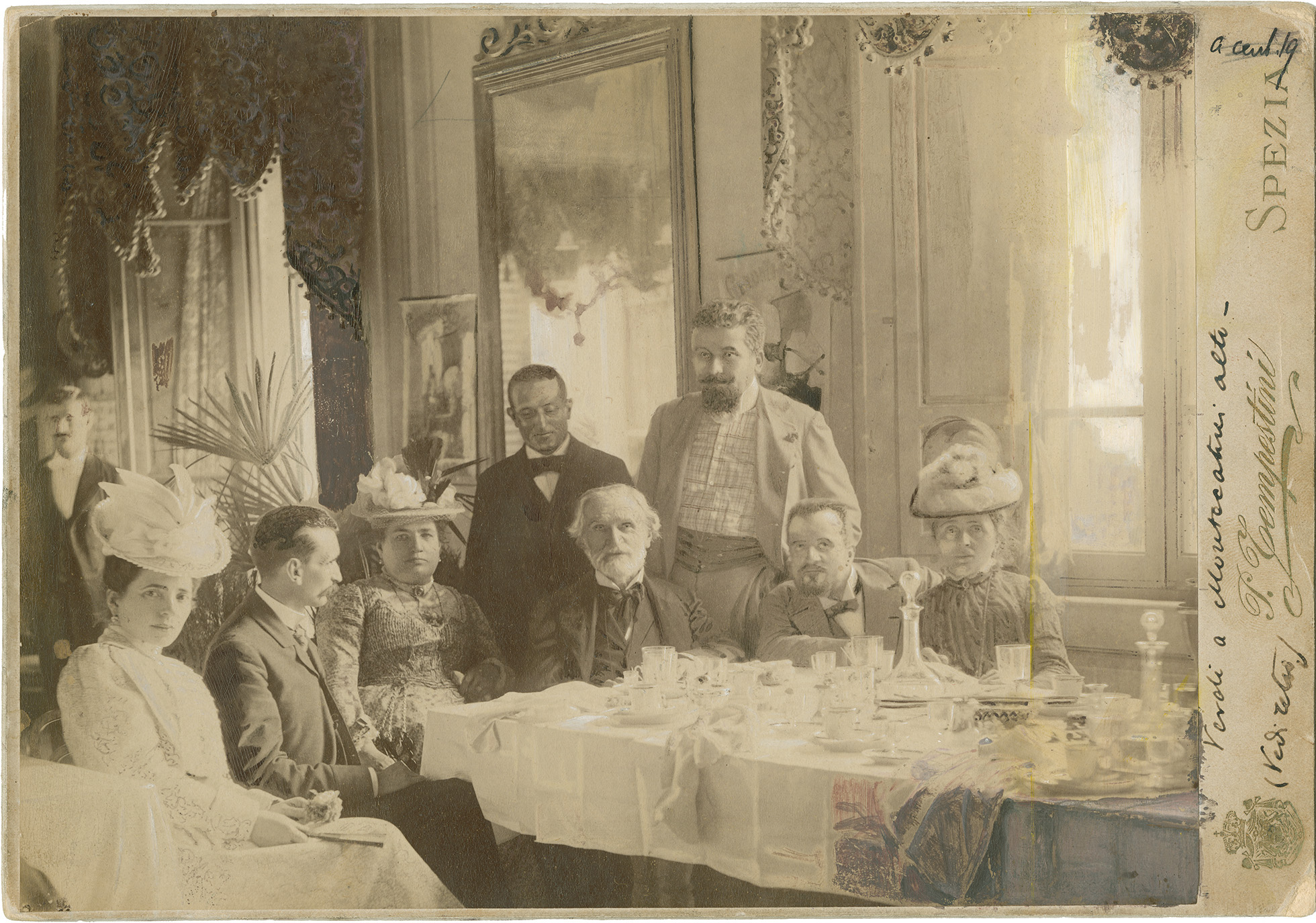
Giuseppina Pasqua (left) in an 1899 group photo with (among others) Teresa Stolz, Giuseppe Verdi and Leopoldo Mugnone in Montecatini Terme

Giuseppina Pasqua was born in Perugia on 19 March 1855. She was from a prosperous family. She studied at the music conservatory in Perugia under Ulisse Corticelli and made her professional opera debut at the city's Teatro Morlacchi in 1868 singing the coloratura soprano role of Oscar in Verdi's Un ballo in maschera. After further study with Marietta Piccolomini, she made her house debut at the Teatro Bellini in Palermo as Marguerite de Valois in Meyerbeer's Les Huguenots. She was still singing soprano roles when she made her La Scala debut on 1 September 1872 as Ännchen in Weber's Der Freischütz.

She then studied with Luigia Abbadia in Milan to retrain her voice as a mezzo-soprano. In 1876 she sang Preziosilla in the first performance of Verdi's La forza del destino at the Teatro San Carlo in Naples. The following year she had a huge success as Amneris in the Teatro Comunale di Bologna's first performance of Verdi's Aida, a role which she would repeat with similar success as La Scala 1878. As a mezzo-soprano she sang leading roles throughout Italy and the rest of Europe. She was a guest artist at the Bolshoi Theatre in Moscow in 1878–1879, and in 1879 she sang Leonor de Guzmán in La favorita at both the Royal Opera House in London and the Bavarian State Opera. She was also very popular in Spain and Portugal where she sang many times. She was the prima donna contralto at the Gran Teatre del Liceu in Barcelona for the 1881–1882, 1884–1885, and 1886–1887 seasons. Particularly admired for her portrayal of Carmen, she was greatly loved by the audiences at Madrid's Teatro Real where she appeared from 1879 to 1897.

== Premieres ==
Pasqua is known to have sung in the following premieres:

- Giovanna di Napoli composed by Errico Petrella (Teatro San Carlo, 27 February 1869) – role unknown
- Un matrimonio civile composed by Giovanni Bolzoni (Teatro Regio di Parma, 11 October 1870) – Maria
- Don Carlo (revised version of Don Carlos) composed by Giuseppe Verdi (La Scala, 10 January 1884) – Princess Eboli
- Falstaff composed by Giuseppe Verdi (La Scala, 9 February 1893) – Mistress Quickly

== Notes and sources ==
Notes

Sources

- Casaglia, Gherardo (2005). "Performances by Giuseppina Pasqua". L'Almanacco di Gherardo Casaglia (in Italian).
- Donati, Fedora Servetti, Budrio: casa nostra, S.T.E.B., 1963
- Kertesz, Elizabeth and Christoforidis, Michael, "Confronting Carmen beyond the Pyrenees: Bizet's opera in Madrid, 1887–1888", Cambridge Opera Journal, 2008, vol. 20, pp. 79–110
- Vetro, Gaspare N. Dizionario della musica e dei musicisti dei territori del Ducato di Parma e Piacenza dalle origini al 1950, Istituzione Casa della Musica
- Virella Cassañes, Francisco, La ópera en Barcelona, estudio histórico-crítico, Establecimiento tip. de Redondo y Xumetra, 1888
