= Linda di Chamounix =

Opera by Gaetano Donizetti

- melodramma semiserio by Gaetano Donizetti
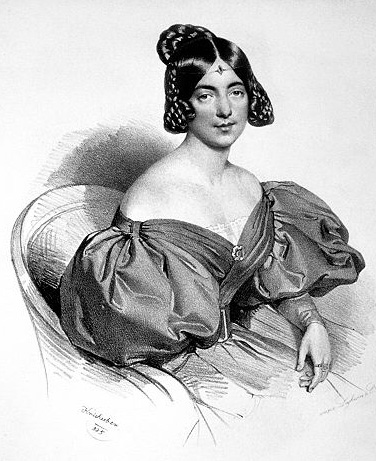
- Eugenia Tadolini, the first singer of the title role, portrait by Josef Kriehuber
- Librettist: Gaetano Rossi
- Language: Italian
- Premiere: 19 May 1842; Kärntnertortheater, Vienna

Linda di Chamounix is melodramma semiserio in three acts by Gaetano Donizetti. The Italian libretto was written by Gaetano Rossi. It premiered in Vienna, at the Kärntnertortheater, on 19 May 1842.

== Performance history ==
Linda di Chamounix was first presented in the UK on 1 June 1843, with its New York premiere following on 4 January 1847 at Palmo's Opera House. The opera was first performed in Buenos Aires on 4 October 1849.

On 1 March 1934, the opera received its Metropolitan Opera premiere with Lily Pons in the title role. Through 25 March 1935, the Met presented the opera in seven more performances, all starring Pons. It has not been performed there since.

The Teatro alla Scala produced the opera in March 1972 conducted by Gianandrea Gavazzeni with Margherita Rinaldi as Linda, Alfredo Kraus as Carlo and Renato Bruson as Antonio. The production was recorded on 17 March. It was given in Geneva in 1975 with the same three cast members and also recorded, as was the performance at the 1983 Wexford Opera Festival.

The 1990s began to see a variety of performances given in several countries, most of which were in concert form. These included two, which were both recorded, which appeared in Stockholm (in September) and in New York (in December) in 1993, the latter presented by the Opera Orchestra of New York with Paul Plishka as Il Prefetto. Another was given on 3 November 1997 at London's Royal Festival Hall under Mark Elder.

In addition, recordings of live stage performances have begun to appear. A DVD was made of a performance in 1996 given by the Zurich Opera with Edita Gruberova as Linda, while Gruberova reprised the role in a La Scala production in April 1998, with Antonio sung by Anthony Michaels-Moore.

Among other performances, the opera was staged by Gran Teatre del Liceu, Barcelona, in 2011 with Diana Damrau and Juan Diego Flórez.

== Roles ==
Role	Voice type	Premiere Cast, 19 May 1842 (Conductor: Gaetano Donizetti)
Linda	soprano	Eugenia Tadolini
Carlo, Vicomte de Sirval	tenor	Napoleone Moriani
Pierotto, an orphan	contralto	Marietta Brambilla
Antonio, Linda's father	baritone	Felice Varesi
Marquis de Boisfleury	basso buffo or baritone	Agostino Rovere
Prefect	basso profondo	Prosper Dérivis
Maddalena, Linda's mother	soprano	Madeleine Nottes Nottes
Intendant	tenor	Michele Novaro
Savoyards of the 1760s, children

== Synopsis ==
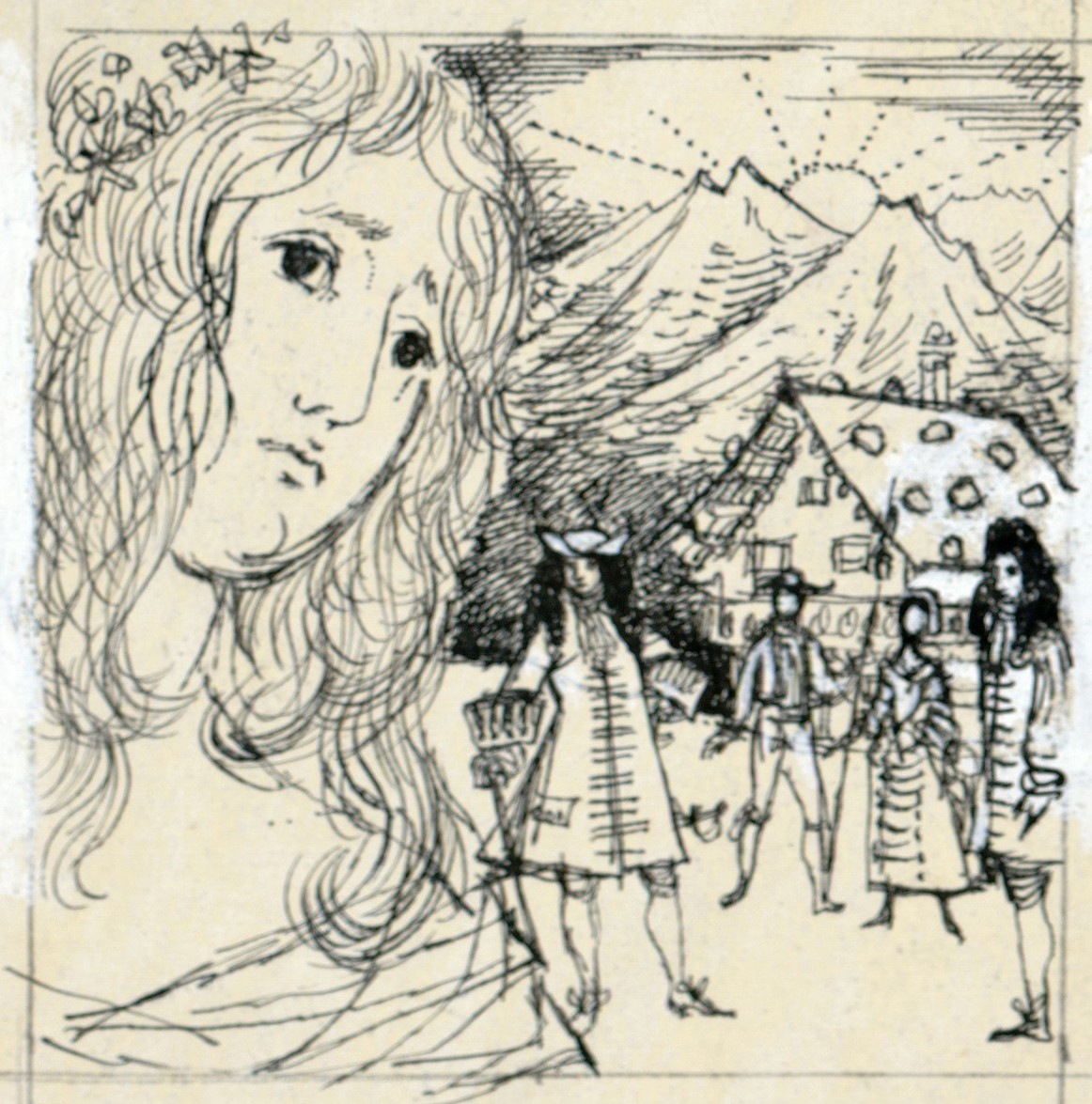
Disegno per copertina di libretto, drawing for Linda di Chamounix (1957).

Place: Chamonix, the French Alps
Time: 1760

=== Act 1 ===
The village square in Chamounix, Savoy, France.

It is dawn, and the villagers are singing on their way to church, for this is the day the young men go to Paris for the winter, to earn money as street entertainers.

Maddalena Loustolot awaits the return of her husband Antonio from a visit to the Marchesa, who owns their farm. Antonio has been anxious that their lease on the farm be renewed, and that the mortgage — held by the Marchesa — not be called in. Antonio arrives, relieved at having been assured that the Marchesa's brother, the Marchese (Marquis of Boisfleury) will speak on their behalf. The Marchese duly arrives, greeted enthusiastically by the villagers. He asks to see Linda, the Loustolot's beautiful daughter, but she is not there. Her parents assume that she has gone early to church.

The Marchese promises Antonio and Maddalena that he will not only renew the lease but also improve the buildings and farmland. There is, however, a hidden agenda: he has designs on Linda, who is the god-daughter of his sister (the Marchesa), and he says that she must come to the castle, where "she may complete her education".

They leave, and Linda enters. She has not been to church, but rather to keep a rendezvous with her beloved Carlo, an impoverished artist. However she arrived too late, and found only some flowers from him ("O luce di quest'anima"). Some girls arrive, followed by Pierotto, who sings his latest song while playing his hurdy-gurdy.

Pierotto's song is about a young girl who leaves home for a better life, but forgets her vows to her mother, falls in love, and then is betrayed. She returns home to find her mother dead, and spends the rest of her life weeping on her mother's grave.

Pierotto and the girls leave; then Carlo arrives, and meets Linda. They express their regret at missing each other earlier, and reaffirm their love. They leave, and the Prefect arrives to see Antonio. But instead of reassuring him of the Marchese's support, he warns Antonio that the Marchese has evil intentions towards his beloved daughter. The Prefect persuades Antonio that Linda must go to Paris with the men of the village, and stay there out of danger, with the Prefect's brother. The village gathers to say farewell to those who are leaving.

=== Act 2 ===
Three months later in Paris

Linda has been followed by Carlo, who has revealed that he is not after all a penniless painter, but the young Viscount of Sirval, son of the Marchesa, and nephew of the Marchese. He has provided for her an apartment in a fashionable quarter, where she now lives until their marriage. Carlo visits her daily. Linda has sent money to her parents, but has not heard from them. She hears familiar music from the street below. It is Pierotto, whom she invites in, and who explains that on arrival in Paris he was taken ill and afterwards was unable to find Linda. He expresses surprise at the luxury of her accommodation, and Linda explains about Carlo, and that their relationship is respectable. Pierotto says that he has seen the Marchese in the street below. After he leaves, the Marchese arrives and tries to persuade Linda to come and live with him. Outraged, Linda orders him out of her house. Carlo arrives having heard the terrible news that his mother has discovered his relationship, and insists that he instead marry a young titled girl immediately. He cannot, however, bring himself to tell Linda, and instead reaffirms his love for her "whatever may happen" before departing again.

Now an old man comes to the door, asking for help. It is Antonio, and he does not recognise this grand young lady as his daughter. When Linda reveals her identity, he is devastated, believing her to be living a life of sin. She tries to reassure him, but when Pierotto comes back to tell Linda that he has discovered that Carlo is to be married to another that very day, Antonio flies into a rage and disowns his daughter. At the thought of her betrayal by Carlo, Linda collapses, losing her mind.

=== Act 3 ===
Spring again in Chamounix

The villagers welcome the young men returning from Paris at winter's end. Carlo arrives and explains to the Prefect that his mother has relented and that he can after all marry Linda, whom he now seeks. The Prefect says that Linda was betrayed by a lover in Paris, has not returned, and cannot be found. Carlo is broken-hearted, telling the Prefect that he was her (entirely innocent) lover.

The Marchese arrives and tells the villagers that there is to be a wedding, and that all the villagers will be invited to the celebrations. "Just wait 'till you see who the bride is!" he says, not knowing of Linda's illness.

Pierotto now arrives, with Linda; they have travelled the 600 miles from Paris, and are exhausted. Carlo sees her, and is distraught by her condition. She recognises nobody. But Pierotto sings to her, his song stirs her, and at last she seems to know her mother. Carlo sings to her of his undying love, and when he sings the words they shared when they first met, Linda's reason is restored. The whole village rejoices in anticipation of the wedding.

== Recordings ==
Year	Cast (Linda, Carlo, Antonio, Pierotto, Prefect, Marquis)	Conductor, Opera House and Orchestra	Label
1953	Margherita Carosio, Gianni Raimondi, Giuseppe Taddei, Rina Corsi, Giuseppe Modesti, Carlo Badioli	Alfredo Simonetto; RAI Milano Orchestra and Chorus	Audio CD: Walhall «Eternity Series» Cat: WLCD 0128
1956	Antonietta Stella, Cesare Valletti, Giuseppe Taddei, Fedora Barbieri, Giuseppe Modesti, Renato Capecchi	Tullio Serafin; Teatro San Carlo Orchestra and Chorus	Audio CD: Philips; Cat: 442 093-2
1972	Margherita Rinaldi, Alfredo Kraus, Renato Bruson, Elena Zilio, Carlo Cava, Enzo Dara	Gianandrea Gavazzeni; Teatro alla Scala Orchestra and Chorus, (Recording of a performance at La Scala, 16 March)	Audio CD: Opera d'Oro; Cat: OPD 1269
1991	Mariella Devia, Luca Canonici, Petteri Salomaa, Sonia Ganassi, Donato di Stefano, Stefano Antoniozzi	Gabriele Bellini; Orchestra of Eastern Netherlands and Netherlands State Opera Chorus	Audio CD: Arts; Cat: 47151-2
1993	Edita Gruberova, Dan Bernardino, Ettore Kim, Monika Groop, Stefano Palatchi, Anders Melander	Friedrich Haider; Swedish Radio Symphony Orchestra and Mikaeli Chamber Choir, (Recording of a concert performance in the Berwald Hall, Stockholm, September)	Audio CD: Nightingale Classics; Cat: NC 070 561-2
1996	Edita Gruberova, Deon van der Walt, Jacob Will, Laszlo Polgar, Armando Ariostini, Nadine Asher, Cornelia Kallisch	Adam Fischer; Orchester der Oper Zurich and Chor des Opernhaus Zurich, (Video recording of a performance at the Zürich Opera)	DVD: TDK Marketing Europe GmbH
2021	Jessica Pratt Francesco Demuro Marina De Lisa Fabio Capitanucci Antonio Garés	Michele Gamba Orchestra e Coro del Maggio Musicale Fiorentino (Recorded at: Teatro del Maggio Musicale Fiorentino; 15, January 2021)	Dynamic: CDS7911.03 DDD
