= Salvadore Cammarano =

Italian librettist and playwright (1801–1852)

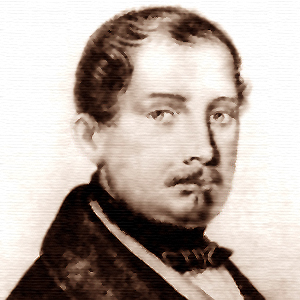
Salvadore Cammarano

Salvadore Cammarano (19 March 1801 – 17 July 1852) was an Italian librettist and playwright, perhaps best known for writing the text of Lucia di Lammermoor (1835) for Gaetano Donizetti.

For Donizetti he also contributed the libretti for L'assedio di Calais (1836), Belisario (1836), Pia de' Tolomei (1837), Roberto Devereux (1837), Maria de Rudenz (1838), Poliuto (1838), and Maria di Rohan (1843), while for Giuseppe Persiani he was the author of Ines de Castro.

For Verdi he wrote Alzira (1845), La battaglia di Legnano (1849) and Luisa Miller (1849), but after he died in July 1852, Verdi worked with Leone Emanuele Bardare to complete the libretto for Il trovatore (1853). Cammarano also started work on a libretto for a proposed adaptation of William Shakespeare's play King Lear, named Re Lear, but he died before completing it; a detailed scenario survives.

His father, Giuseppe, was a painter and set-designer. His son, Michele, was also a painter.

== Libretti by Cammarano ==
- 1834: La sposa (Egisto Vignozzi)
- 1835: Ines de Castro (Giuseppe Persiani), in collaboration with Giovanni Emanuele Bidera
- 1835: Un matrimonio per ragione (Giuseppe Staffa)
- 1835: Lucia di Lammermoor (Gaetano Donizetti)
- 1836: Belisario (Gaetano Donizetti)
- 1836: L'assedio di Calais (Gaetano Donizetti)
- 1836: Eufemio di Messina (Giuseppe Persiani), from an original libretto by Felice Romani
- 1837: Pia de' Tolomei (Gaetano Donizetti)
- 1837: Roberto Devereux (Gaetano Donizetti)
- 1838: Maria de Rudenz (Gaetano Donizetti)
- 1838: Poliuto (Gaetano Donizetti), first performance 1848
- 1838: Elena da Feltre (Saverio Mercadante)
- 1839: I ciarlatani (Luigi Cammarano)
- 1839: Il Conte di Chalais (Giuseppe Lillo)
- 1840: Cristina di Svezia (Alessandro Nini)
- 1840: Saffo (Giovanni Pacini)
- 1840: La vestale (Saverio Mercadante)
- 1841: Luigi Rolla (Federico Ricci)
- 1842: Il proscritto (Saverio Mercadante)
- 1842: La fidanzata corsa (Giovanni Pacini)
- 1843: Maria di Rohan (Gaetano Donizetti)
- 1843: Il reggente (Saverio Mercadante)
- 1843: Ester d'Engaddi (Achille Peri)
- 1843: Il ravvedimento (Luigi Cammarano)
- 1845: Bondelmonte (Giovanni Pacini)
- 1845: Alzira (Giuseppe Verdi)
- 1845: Il vascello de Gama (Saverio Mercadante)
- 1845: Stella di Napoli (Giovanni Pacini)
- 1846: Orazi e Curiazi (Saverio Mercadante)
- 1847: Merope (Giovanni Pacini)
- 1847: Eleonora Dori (Vincenzo Battista)
- 1849: La battaglia di Legnano (Giuseppe Verdi)
- 1849: Luisa Miller (Giuseppe Verdi)
- 1850: Virginia (Saverio Mercadante), first performance 1866
- 1850: Non v'è fumo senza fuoco (Luigi Cammarano)
- 1851: Malvina di Scozia (Giovanni Pacini)
- 1851: Folco d'Arles (Nicola De Giosa)
- 1851: Medea (Saverio Mercadante), from an original libretto by Felice Romani
- 1853: Il trovatore (Giuseppe Verdi)
