= Giuseppe Lillo =

Italian composer (1814–1863)

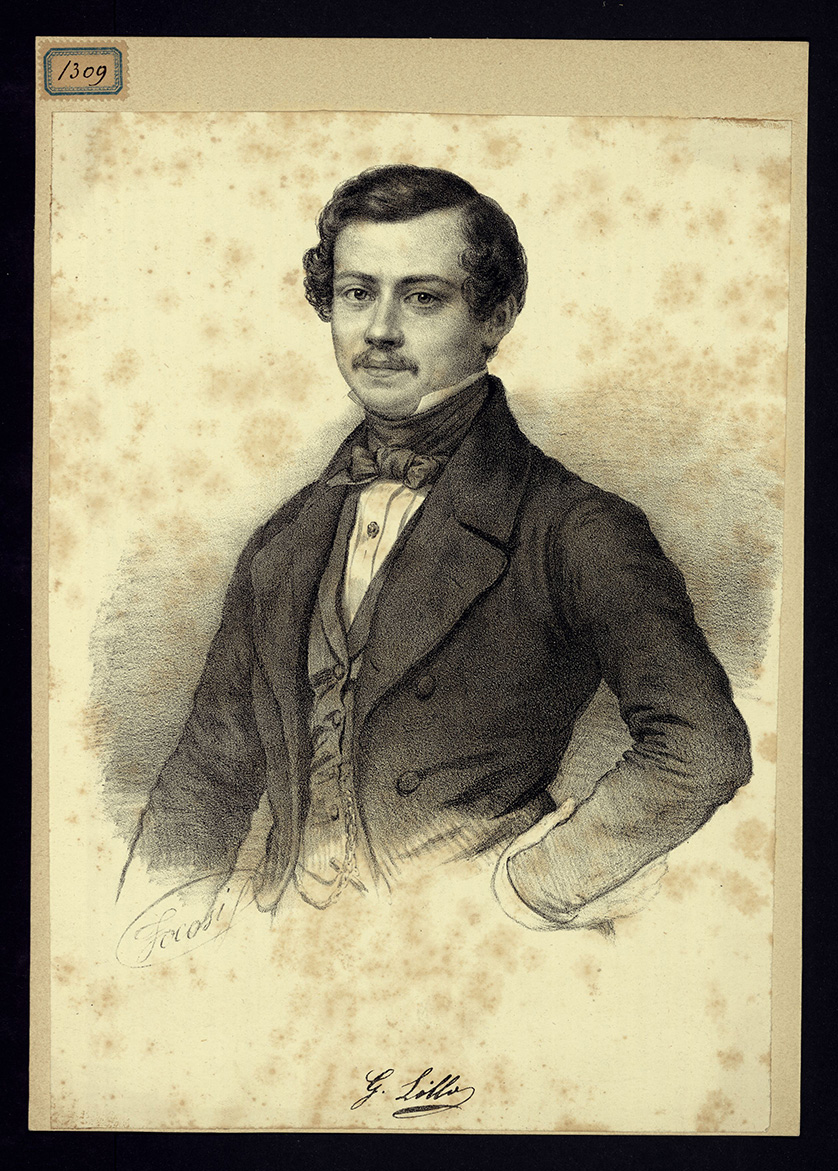
Giuseppe Lillo. Portrait by Roberto Focosi.

Giuseppe Lillo (26 February 1814 - 4 February 1863) was an Italian composer. He is best known for his operas which followed in the same vein of Gioachino Rossini. He also produced works for solo piano, a small amount of sacred music, and some chamber music.

== Life and career ==
Born in Galatina in the Province of Lecce, Lillo was the son of conductor Giosuè Lillo. He received his earliest musical training from his father before entering the Naples Conservatory where he studied harmony and counterpoint with Giovanni Furno, piano with Francesco Lanza, and composition with Niccolò Antonio Zingarelli. His first composition, a mass for four voices and orchestra, premiered to a warm reception in 1834.

As a composer Lillo primarily composed music for the stage. His first opera, La moglie per 24 ore, ossia L’ammalato di buona salute, premiered successfully at the Real Collegio di Musica during Carnival of 1834. He quickly gained a great deal of popularity with the Naples public with opera serias like Il gioiello (1835), Odda di Bernaver (1837), and Il conte di Chalais (1839). The pinnacle of his success came with his only opera comica, L’osteria di Andujar, which premiered in Fondo on 30 September 1840. After 1840, Lillo composed several more operas up through 1853, most of which were received with poor or mediocre responses. He was never able to re-obtain the popularity that he had enjoyed earlier in his career.

Around 1840 Lillo was appointed joint music director of the Teatro di San Carlo with Giacomo Cordella. He also began teaching piano in the early 1840s. He joined the faculty of the Naples Conservatory sometime around 1850, eventually being appointed professor of harmony in 1859; a position he held until his death in Naples four year later.

== List of operas ==
- La moglie per 24 ore, ossia L’ammalato di buona salute, opera buffa in 2 acts, libretto by A. Passaro, Naples, Real Collegio di Musica, carnival 1834
- Il gioiello, opera semiseria in 2 acts, libretto by Leopoldo Tarantini, Naples, Teatro Nuovo, autumn 1835
- Odda di Bernaver, opera seria in 2 acts, libretto by Giovanni Emanuele Bidera, Naples, Teatro San Carlo, 28 February 1837
- Rosmunda in Ravenna, tragedia lirica in 2 acts, libretto by Luisa Amalia Paladini, Venice, Teatro La Fenice, 26 December 1837
- Alisa di Rieux, opera semiseria in 3 acts, libretto by Gaetano Rossi, Rome, Teatro Argentina, spring 1838
- La modista, opera semiseria in 2 acts, Florence, Teatro La Pergola, 9 May 1839
- Il conte di Chalais, opera seria in 2 acts, libretto by Salvatore Cammarano, Naples, Teatro San Carlo, October 1839
- Le disgrazie di un bel giovane, ossia Il zio e il nipote, opera giocosa in 2 acts, libretto by Leopoldo Tarantini, Florence, Teatro La Pergola, spring 1840
- Le nozze campestri, dramma per musica in 1 atto, libretto by Giovanni Schmidt, Naples, Teatro San Carlo, 30 May 1840
- L’osteria di Andujar, opera comica in 3 acts, libretto by Leopoldo Tarantini, Naples, Teatro del Fondo, 30 September 1840
- Cristina di Svezia, tragedia lirica in 3 acts, libretto by Salvatore Cammarano, Naples, Teatro San Carlo, 21 January 1841
- Lara, tragedia lirica in 2 acts, libretto by Leopoldo Tarantini, Naples, Teatro San Carlo, carnival 1842
- Il cavaliere di San Giorgio, ossia Il mulatto, opera semiseria in 2 acts, libretto by Jacopo Ferretti, Turin, Teatro Carignano, autumn 1846
- Caterina Howard, opera tragica in 4 acts, libretto by G. Giachetti, Naples, Teatro San Carlo, 26 September 1849
- La Delfina, opera semiseria in 2 acts, libretto by M. d’Arienzo, Naples, Teatro Nuovo, March 1850
- La gioventù di Shakespeare, ossia Il sogno d’una notte estiva, commedia lirica in 3 acts, libretto by G.S. Giannini, Naples, Teatro Nuovo, 29 December 1851
- Ser Babbeo, opera semiseria in 3 acts, libretto by L.E. Bardare, Naples, Teatro Nuovo, 8 May 1853
- Il figlio della schiava, dramma lirico in 3 acts, libretto by G.S. Giannini, Naples, Teatro del Fondo, 9 July 1853
