= Renato Bruson =

Italian operatic baritone

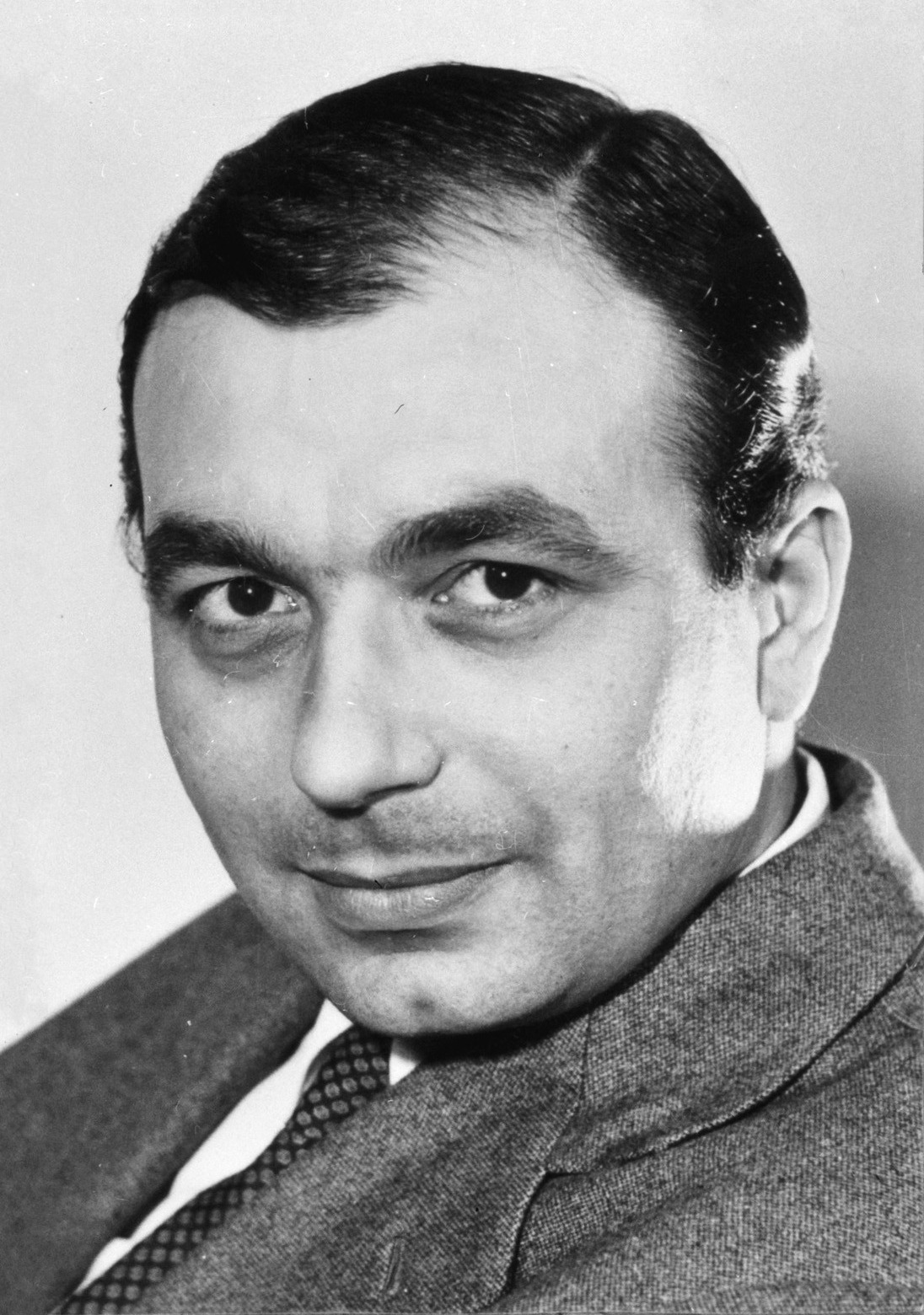
- Bruson in 1965
- Born: 13 January 1936 (age 90); Granze, Italy
- Education: Conservatory of Padua
- Occupation: Operatic baritone

Renato Bruson (born 13 January 1936) is an Italian operatic baritone. Bruson is widely considered one of the most important Verdi baritones of the late 20th and early 21st century.

== Life and career ==
Bruson was born in Granze near Padua on 13 January 1936. His passion for music matured in the parish choir when he was a child. He began his music studies at the conservatory of Padua where he was awarded a scholarship that allowed him to attend the courses in the face of economic problems. He did not receive much support from his family, who considered him a good-for-nothing. In his own words: "They thought that I only wanted to study music because I had no desire to work. At that time, the general feeling where I lived was that if someone worked, they had a future, whereas those who studied, especially if they studied music, were considered failures who would never find their path in life." However, he could continue his studies with the help of the administration of the conservatory and the support of friends.

Bruson made his operatic debut as the Conte di Luna in Verdi's Il trovatore at the Teatro Lirico Sperimentale in Spoleto in 1960. The following year he was Riccardo in Bellini's I puritani at the Teatro dell'Opera di Roma in Rome. His first Metropolitan Opera appearance was as Enrico in Donizetti's Lucia di Lammermoor in 1969. In 1970 he started his collaboration with conductor Riccardo Muti as Renato in Verdi's Un ballo in maschera in Florence. He made his debut at La Scala in Milan in 1972 as Antonio in Donizetti's Linda di Chamonix, at the Edinburgh International Festival in 1972 as Ezio in Verdi's Attila, at the Royal Opera House in London in 1975 as Renato in Un ballo in maschera, substituting with great success for Piero Cappuccilli.

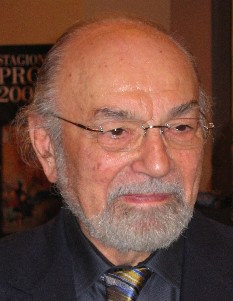
Bruson in 2008

He first appeared at the Vienna State Opera in 1978 in the title role of Verdi's Macbeth, with such a success that the theatre awarded him the title of Kammersänger. In the 1980s he turned to the 18th century, in the title role of Mozart's Don Giovanni, and to Italian verismo with Umberto Giordano's Andrea Chénier.

Bruson is considered by some critics the finest Rigoletto since Tito Gobbi. They praise his elegant and expressive phrasing, velvety tone, musical intelligence and acting qualities. He excels in long, lyrical lines. He is also appreciated for not disdaining smaller roles and for not assuming a diva attitude. Bruson once described himselfs: "I am self critic enough to understand what I can get at. Since I knew I did not have a thundering voice to make coarse effects, I sought the interpretation since I think it is more important that the public go home with something in their hearts than some sounds in their ears".

Bruson recorded the role of Macbeth on DVD in a performance from Deutsche Oper Berlin alongside Mara Zampieri and James Morris.

== Videography ==
- The Metropolitan Opera Centennial Gala, Deutsche Grammophon DVD, 00440-073-4538, 2009

== Acknowledgements ==
- Carlo Maria Giulini: "I believe Renato Bruson now is the Falstaff. He has the wit, the intelligence, the dignity and, of course, the voice. Basta."
- Giuseppe Sinopoli: "Only the baritone Renato Bruson has a similar ability (to Mirella Freni) to make expression and word coincide, he explores it with all the semantic charge it contains. And this is not the result of an intellectual activity but is a privileged instinct".
- Music critic Christian Springer wrote of Bruson: "Bruson was the quintessential Verdi baritone in the second half of the last century. A Verdi baritone not as it was understood (or rather, misunderstood) in the 1950s and 1960s, but a Verdi baritone as understood and desired by the composer himself."

== Honors and awards ==
Bruson has received numerous honors, including:

- Honorary citizenship of Fermo
- Doctor Honoris Causa by the University of Urbino
- Honorary citizenship of Parma
- Honorary citizenship of Ortona (birth city of Francesco Paolo Tosti, of whom he performed many works)
- Honorary citizenship of Palmi (birth city of Francesco Cilea)
- Honorary membership of the "Donizetti Society" of London
- Cavaliere di Gran Croce of the Italian Republic
- Commendation of the Sovereign Military Order of Malta
- Kammersänger awarded by the Wiener Staatsoper

He received the Orphée d'or by the French Académie du disque Lyrique in 1980 for the Luisa Miller on Deutsche Grammophon.
