= La vestale (Mercadante) =

Saverio Mercadante

La vestale (The Vestal Virgin) is an opera by Italian composer Saverio Mercadante. It takes the form of a tragedia lirica in three acts. The libretto, by Salvadore Cammarano, was influenced by Victor-Joseph Étienne de Jouy's libretto for Spontini's more famous 1807 opera of the same name.

The opera's first performance took place at the Teatro San Carlo, Naples, on 10 March 1840.

== Performance history ==
After its first performance, the opera was one of the most frequently performed of Mercadante's operas, with around one hundred and fifty given.

The opera was revived at the Wexford Festival in 2004. Cast members included Doriana Milazzo as Emilia and Dante Alcalá as Decio.

== Roles ==
Roles, voice types, premiere cast
Role	Voice type	Premiere cast, 10 March 1840 Conductor: Antonio Farelli
Emilia, a vestal virgin	soprano	Adelina Spech-Salvi
Giunia, another vestal and Emilia's friend	mezzo-soprano	Eloisa Buccini
Decio, a warrior and Emilia's lover	tenor	Domenico Reina
Publio, Decio's friend	baritone	Paul Barroilhet
Licinio Murena, a consul and Decio's father	tenor	Timoleone Barattini
Lucio Silano, a consul	bass	Michele Benedetti
Metello Pio, the High Priest	bass	Pietro Gianni
La gran vestale (the chief Vestal Virgin)	mezzo-soprano	Anna Salvetti

== Synopsis ==
Place: Ancient Rome
Time: the Gallic Wars

=== Act 1 ===
A sacred wood

Emilia, who believes that her lover, the warrior Decio, is dead, has joined the Vestal Virgins. The Gran Vestale (High Priestess) announces that Decio has defeated the Gauls. Emilia, unable to escape from her new position, is comforted by her friend Giulia, also a vestal virgin. When Decio arrives, he is aghast to discover that, of all the vestal virgins, it is Emilia who presents him with the laurel wreath. Alone, they lament their fate, but Decio decides that he will defy the Goddess. His friend Publio tries to keep him on the right side of the law, but eventually agrees that he will help Decio to see Emilia in secret in the Temple.

=== Act 2 ===
Scene 1: The Temple of Vesta

Giunia is praying for Emilia, while the Gran Vestale warns Emilia that if the sacred flame is allowed to go out, Rome will be in danger and the guardian of the flame will have to die. Decio arrives through the secret passage, leaving Publio to keep watch. Decio and Emilia are in despair and he threatens to commit suicide. Emilia dissuades him, but suddenly the flame goes out. Publio pulls Decio away as Emilia faints and is attended by Giunia. Metello arrives, admonishes the vestal virgins, and insists that Emilia be tried by the Senate.

Scene 2: In the sacred wood outside the Temple

The Senate gathers, and Licinio (Decio's father) condemns Emilia to death. Giunia tries to take the blame, but Emilia rejects her offer. Decio asks Licinio to spare Emilia, but his father disowns him.

=== Act 3 ===
Outside Emilia's tomb

Publio attempts to change Licinio's mind, pointing out that Decio is contemplating suicide. Licinio is adamant that the law must take its course. Emilia, who has lost her reason, thinks that her funeral cortège is for her wedding. However, approaching her tomb, she recovers and bids farewell to Giunia and the vestals. Decio and his troops arrive, but it is too late. He attacks Metello, but Licinio intervenes. Decio decides to join Emilia in death and commits suicide.

== Recordings ==
Year	Cast: Emilia, La Gran Vestale, Giunia, Decio	Conductor, opera house and orchestra	Label
1970	Angela Vercelli, Licia Falcone, Miriam Pirazzini, Giuseppe Gismondo	Giuseppe Ruisi, Orchestra of Altamura and Chorus of Altamura (Recording of a performance at Civitavecchia on 26 August)	78rpm: A.N.N.A. Record Company; Cat: ANNA 1012
1987	Dunja Vejzović, Filka Dimitrova, Paola Romanò, Gianfranco Cecchele	Vjekoslav Šutej, Teatro Nazionale Croato di Spalato Orchestra and Chorus	CD: Bongiovanni; GB 2065/66-2
2004	Doriana Milazzo, Danna Glaser, Agata Bienkowska, Dante Alcalá	Paolo Arrivabeni, Kraków Philharmonic Orchestra and Wexford Festival Opera Chorus (Recorded at performances in the Theatre Royal, Wexford on 23, 26, 29 October)	CD: Marco Polo; Cat: 8.225310-11
