= Soprano sfogato =

Type of vocal range

Soprano sfogato ('Vented' soprano) is a contralto or mezzo-soprano who is capable — by sheer industry or natural talent — of extending her upper range and encompassing the coloratura soprano tessitura. An upwardly extended natural soprano is sometimes called a soprano assoluta. (Note: In Italian, the term is soprano assoluto. In English, "soprano assoluta" is used.)

== Origin ==
In the early 19th century as well as in the baroque and classical periods, distinctions between voices were not based so much on the range as in the tessitura and color of the voice. There were two main groups: soprano and alto. Their range was often blurred, relying more on tessitura to cast different roles in opera. In Italian bel canto, the soprano did not have extremely high notes actually written (often just to B_{5} or high C_{6}) and it was not until the "nightingale" type of sopranos such as Jenny Lind, Fanny Persiani, Adelina Patti, and her imitators that ending the cabalettas in a climactic high E_{6} or E♭_{6} became traditional as it was in the French grand opera which became so popular when Rossini moved to Paris. Singers however did ornament higher than C_{6} but in a light and fast way as it was done still in the classical and baroque periods. Virtuosity was shown by mercurial agility, changes in register and tessitura, perfect control of dynamics and tonal coloration, not by whistle-like high notes.

For contraltos on the other hand, they started to be more used in Rossini's bel canto operas for example, and to assume roles replacing the castrati who by that time were almost extinct, and composers demanded a range often going as high as B_{5}. This change in demand of the voice would give birth to the soprano sfogato or assoluta.

These voices had in common with those of the greatest castrati the ability to sing widely contrasting tessituras, segments well into the contralto and segments in high soprano.

== Characteristics ==
By definition, the soprano sfogato is linked to the contralto. It possesses a dark timbre with a rich and strong low register, as well as the high notes of a soprano and occasionally a coloratura soprano. Those voices are typically strong, dramatic and agile, supported by an excellent bel canto technique and an ability to sing in the soprano tessitura as well as in the contralto tessitura with great ease, such as was said of Giuditta Pasta.

== Exponents ==
The term soprano sfogato appeared in the bel canto era of the 19th century, the time when its greatest exponents were performing. They included: Isabella Colbran, Giuditta Pasta, Maria Malibran, Giuseppina Ronzi de Begnis, Wilhelmine Schröder-Devrient, Mary Ann Paton (Mrs. Wood), Giuseppina Strepponi, Emma Calvé, Marianne Brandt, Félia Litvinne, among others. Another example was Pauline Viardot, who alternated roles of soprano and contralto.

In the 20th century, the main exponent of this voice category was Maria Callas who had a range of F♯ below middle C to in alt E_{6}. She sang and recorded (both in-full and excerpts of) roles for mezzo-soprano, such as Cenerentola, Iphigenia, Carmen, Rosina and Dalila in their original keys, as well as lighter, high coloratura roles such as Lucia, Amina, Gilda, Violetta and excerpts from Lakmé. She was also known for portraying roles with the dramatic and technical demands, contrasts, and ranges closely associated with the soprano sfogato, such as Médée, Armida, Norma, Anna Bolena, Imogene, Abigaille, and Lady Macbeth.

== Roles ==
Other roles associated with this voice type are Elisabetta in Roberto Devereux, Gemma di Vergy, Reiza in Carl Maria von Weber's Oberon.

The common requirements for the roles associated with this voice type are:

- widely varied tessitura throughout the role, extended segments lying well into the low mezzo or contralto tessitura and segments lying in high soprano tessitura
- a range extending down to at least low B and at least up to the B below high C with at least one whole tone required at either end
- fioritura (coloratura) singing in the most intricate bel canto style
- florid singing combined with heroic weight
- a heavy or dense sound in the lower range
- vocal power over energetic orchestral accompaniment

The major exponents of the soprano sfogato vocal type were able to sing both soprano and contralto roles: Giuseppina Ronzi de Begnis was the first Elisabetta in Devereux, and she also performed Bellini's Romeo as well as Norma; Isabella Colbran sang both Armida and Desdemona in Rossini's Otello as well as the contralto role of Paisiello's Nina and Mozart's soprano heroines; Giuditta Pasta originated Anna Bolena, Norma and La Sonnambula as well as singing Cenerentola, Tancredi, Arsace, Cherubino and Romeo.

== Notes and references ==
Notes
