= Giuseppe de Begnis =

Italian operatic bass singer

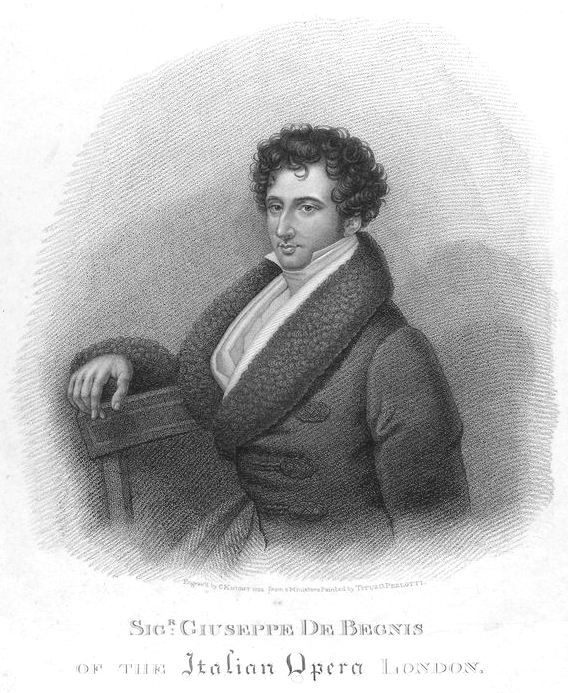
- Giuseppe de Begnis in London in 1822
- Born: 1793; Lugo, Italy
- Died: August 10, 1849 (aged 55–56); New York City, U.S.

Giuseppe de Begnis (1793-10 August 1849) was an Italian operatic bass singer. Born in Lugo di Romagna, he started his musical education when he was 7 years old, under Padre Bongiovanni, and sang soprano in the church. At age 15 he had serious problems with his voice and began studying acting under Mandini, a famous actor of the time. His father did not want Giuseppe to become a comedian and in due course the young man became a pupil of the composer Giovanni Morandi, the husband of the singer Rosa Morandi.

In the autumn of 1816 he married the soprano Giuseppina Ronzi de Begnis in Bologna and they were together until 1825. His countenance was seriously affected by smallpox, but he was skilled at applying make-up and on stage he gave no evidence of facial disfigurement.

By 1815 he had established himself in a promising career which continued until the late 1820s in Italy, France and London and then in Ireland from 1829 where he also ran an opera company. He continued to sing and manage opera companies in Scotland and from New York from 1838, where he lived until his death in 1849. He has been described as "an ideal interpreter of Rossini's comic operas".

== Operatic career ==
=== Beginnings, 1813 to 1817 ===
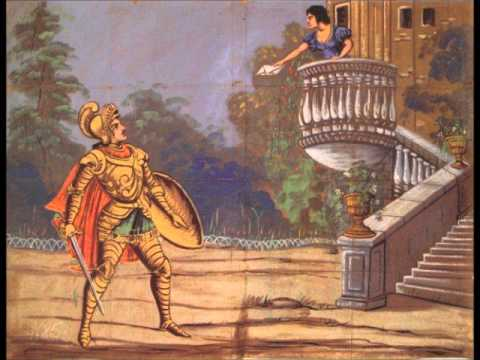
Scene from Mayr's Ginevra di Scozia

De Begnis made his debut in Modena during the Carnival 1813 season as a primo buffo in Stefano Pavesi's Ser Marcantonio. He was greeted by generous applause and this proved to him that he was moving in the right direction. From there he went to Forli and Rimini, ending the first year of his professional career again in Modena. For the new carnival season he was in Siena for the inauguration of the newly built Teatro degli Accademici Rozzi. There he sang the most demanding role of Uberto in Ferdinando Paër's Agnese – an opera semi-seria that includes one of the earliest and most dramatic mad scenes. This was a challenge that did not intimidate the young de Begnis because he had studied and refined his acting; in fact, the audience responded with enthusiasm and he was praised "both as an actor and singer".

This was followed by an equally successful Selim in Rossini's Il Turco in Italia. His familiarization with stage and public, as well as with colleagues and musicians, was a learning process that enabled him to aim higher. From Tuscany he moved on to Ferrara, Badia, and Trieste. At the Teatro Nuovo of the latter town he sang Don Placenzio in Luigi Caruso's Così si fa alle donne, followed by Carlo Coccia's farsa per musica La Matilde; Giuseppe Farinelli's Teresa e Claudio; Pietro Carlo Guglielmi's Don Papirio; and Filippo Celli's Don Timonella di Piacenza.

During the 1815–1816 carnival season, on 17 February 1816, he made his debut at La Scala in Simone Mayr's Ginevra di Scozia. This was only a short engagement; but for most of the carnival season he was busy closer to home at Cesena where he impressed the audience with his performance in Valentino Fioravanti's dramma giocoso per musica Il bello piace a tutti. He delivered his main aria in the old rondo style imitating the celebrated mezzo-soprano castrato Gaspare Pacchierotti; his falsetto stunned the public and an ovation followed. De Begnis went on to Vincenzo Pucitta's farsa giocosa per musica La burla fortunata ossia I due prigionieri, and concluded the carnival season with the opera buffa La guerra aperta by Pietro Carlo Guglielmi. Between 1934 and 1938, he was director of the company and after 1938 he became its general manager. The latter he repeated in Mantova during spring, but before that, he appeared for the first time in Rossini's L'Italiana in Algeri as the bey of Algiers, Mustafà. The Rossini fever that was sweeping Italy had reached Udine, where in the summer de Begnis repeated his Mustafà, followed by L'inganno felice.

=== Rossini's relationship with the de Begnis couple, 1817 to 1819 ===
Between 1802 and 1804 Rossini lived in Lugo, his father's birthplace and Giuseppe de Begnis' birthplace. Both studied music in Lugo, Giuseppe being only one year younger than Gioachino. How much this coincidence influenced Giuseppe's career may never be known, but certainly Lugo di Romagna was, at the time, a small town where everyone knew each other. The Morandis were good friends of Giacchino Rossini, and it was probably at their suggestion that the composer offered Giuseppe a magnificent opportunity, creating the role of Dandini for him in La cenerentola. This opera premiered in Rome on 25 January 1817 and ran for twenty consecutive performances; it was to remain in his repertory for the rest of his life.

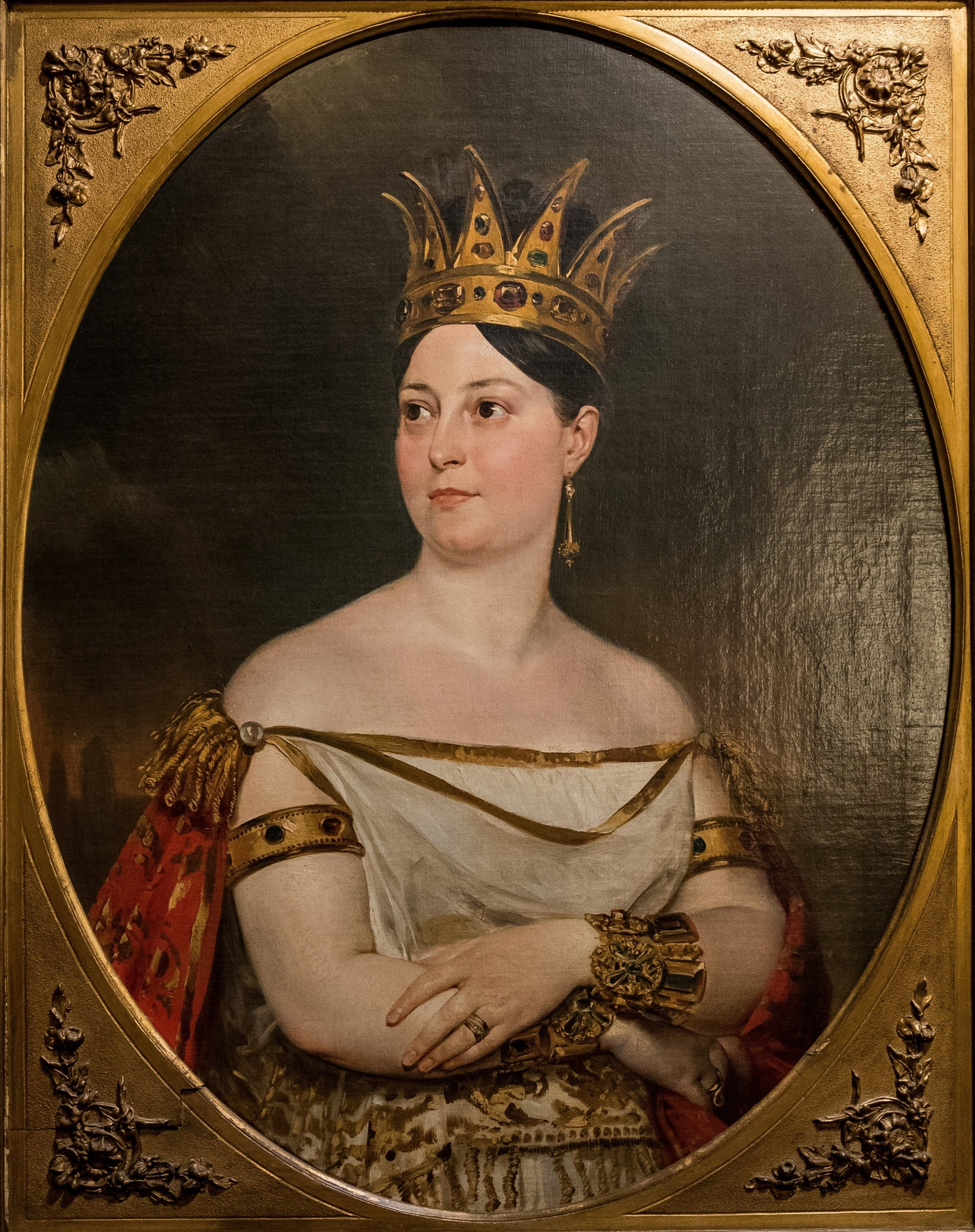
Giuseppina Ronzi de Begnis by Karl Briullov.

That same year while in Verona, the de Begnis couple met a very young Donizetti. In the course of time his voice matured and his technique became more sophisticated and as early as 1821 he was described as baritone. In 1818, for the grand inauguration of the newly built Teatro Nuovo in Pesaro, Rossini wanted Isabella Colbran and Andrea Nozzari—who had appeared in the Naples premiere—for a new production of his Armida. However budget constraints forced him to downsize and when an attempt to secure his friend Rosa Morandi for La gazza ladra failed, he engaged Giuseppina Ronzi de Begnis as Ninetta and, at a reduced fee, her husband Giuseppe de Begnis as the Mayor. He often composed with particular performers in mind. This move left him with enough money to engage a first class tenor like Alberico Curioni for the role of Giannetto.

=== Paris, 1819 to 1822 ===
In January 1819, Giuseppe and Giuseppina moved to Paris where they sang for the re-opening of the Théâtre Italien in the Parisian premiere of Ferdinando Paër's dramma semi-serio I Fuoriusciti di Firenze on 20 March. The opera received a good review in Le Moniteur Universel, and the Journal de Paris praised Giuseppe for his Uberto and Giuseppina for her Isabella. In due course, by popular demand, Paër expanded Giuseppe's role by adding a scena and an aria expressly for him in Act 1.

In the meantime Rossini had been informed that the de Begnises had been secured for La gazza ladra. The prospects were encouraging and on 5 May the couple sang in Pietro Alessandro Guglielmi's La pastorella nobile. Positive reviews greeted them during the summer of the same year when they sang in Domenico Cimarosa's Il matrimonio segreto and Rossini's Il Turco in Italia. On 3 April 1821 the couple was busy singing in Rossini's La Pietra del Paragone: Giuseppe sang Marforio and Giuseppina sang Clarice. At the end of 1821 Giuseppe was in Bologna for the Carnival season and there he sang in Rossini's La gazza ladra at the Teatro Comunale di Bologna.

=== London and Edinburgh, 1822 to 1832 ===
In April 1822 the de Begnises arrived in London, where their debut took place that summer in the well-tested Il Turco in Italia. As would be expected, the public and critics were enchanted with Giuseppina, but Giuseppe was equally praised. The Times critic, Thomas M. Alsager, described his voice as "barytone, not powerful, but extremely pure and flexible".

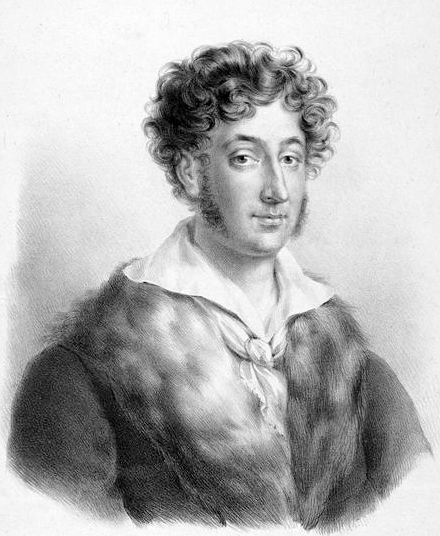
Giuseppe de Begnis, portrait of December 1828 when appointed "Director and Instructor of the Pupils of the Royal Academy of Music"

That same first London season, he sang in the London premiere of Rossini's Matilde di Shabran.

The de Begnises returned the following season in Il Turco in Italia and during the same year Giuseppe sang Fernando in La gazza ladra. On 10 September 1823 he sang in Rossini's Otello. Still in London in 1824, he appeared as Leporello in Don Giovanni receiving good reviews; this role remained in his repertory and he sang the role in Scotland in 1832. A real war-horse for Giuseppe was his Don Febeo in Simone Mayr's Che originali renamed Il fanatico per la musica which he sang throughout his career. In 1825 he appeared in Mercadante's Elisa e Claudio at Faenza; that same year and in the following few years, Count Almaviva in Le nozze di Figaro and Alfonso in Così fan tutte were roles in which he was frequently heard. Similarly, in 1826, he made appearances as Don Magnifico in La cenerentola, in 1827 it was as Mustapha in Giovanni Pacini's La Schiava in Bagdad, with Caradori, Zuchelli (real name Rebecca Isaacs) and Curioni, as well as in Il Turco in Italia and La gazza ladra.

In May/June 1827, he returned to Italy for a brief period to sing in Matilde di Shabran and then in Giuseppe Farinelli's Camilla and La Locandiera. In 1827, his last season at the King's Theatre in London, he was seen again in Pacini's La schiava di Bagdad. After this, he led a touring company to Scotland.

De Begnis began teaching acting at the Royal Academy of Music in London in 1828.

==== De Begnis as opera company artistic director, 1823 to 1832 ====
Meanwhile, in 1823, he had become the artistic director of Italian opera seasons in Bath, a post he held until 1824. Then he held the same post in Edinburgh from 1827 to 1828. La cenerentola had a special place in his heart and in March 1831, when this opera returned at The King's Theatre in London, a great surprise awaited the public with Lablache singing Dandini and de Begnis as Don Magnifico: "The duet between them, "Un segreto d'importanza" was a rich unctuous piece of comic acting". This situation occurred again in 1833, when Vincenzo Galli sang Dandini opposite to de Begnis's Don Magnifico. In both instances the critics would have preferred a switch of the roles, although they credited de Begnis with doing an excellent job.

=== Dublin 1829 to 1837 ===
Appearing in Dublin in 1829, de Begnis sang Figaro in Il Barbiere di Siviglia to great acclaim. Later, returning to Dublin between 1834 and 1837, his continued presence there led to his becoming the impresario who produced the first professionally managed Italian opera company in Northern Ireland. Furthermore, he was long remembered for being the first Giorgio in I Puritani on 4 February 1837: his Suoni la tromba with Berrettoni was very highly regarded.

=== America, 1838 until his death ===
In 1838 Giuseppe de Begnis travelled to the United States where he was to remain for the rest of his life. His reputation had preceded him and his New York debut took place on 18 September at the National Theatre where he shone as Figaro in a grand scene from Il Barbiere di Siviglia; the following night he sang his time-tested Il fanatico per la musica. Don Febeo and Figaro remained his most applauded roles in the United States. On 3 November 1838, he gave a concert in Boston at the Boylston Hall.

The positive reception which de Begnis received is confirmed by the contemporary American critic Richard Grant White:

Among the artists of reputation who were known in the second quarter of this century, Giuseppe de Begnis was indisputably the great buffo of his time. He was a singer of the old Italian school, had been thoroughly trained in music from his childhood up, and would have been an accomplished artist even without his vocal gifts and his comic opera. With him, buffo-singing did not mean buffoonery, and he thought great scorn of those who descended to low tricks to promote laughter... By a mere look he sometimes produced an irresistibly comical effect; and although his voice was rich and smooth, its inflections conveyed ludicrous ideas with a delicacy and quickness which pierced his audiences with laughter. To his mother's great delight he was an outstandingly musical child, unlike his sisters, who inherited their father's indifference to music, while his brother was interested only in cats. His principal operas were II Barbiere and Il fanatico per la musica.

Based in New York and living and working there, de Begnis' experience was typical of Italian and other companies of the period which travelled to present performances in various parts of the East Coast, including Boston and other cities. For a while he successfully managed Palmo's Opera House and given his entrepreneurial skills, in 1842 he made a concerted effort to organize an opera season in New York but encountered a large number of obstacles. In the meantime he had compiled and published The Carcanet, an anthology of vocal music. He made a living as a vocal teacher and in due course he started a profitable pedagogical venture with Madame Mecovino-Malone, an English mezzo soprano that had settled in New York. As late as 1844 he was Figaro in Il Barbiere di Siviglia at Palmo's Opera House in April and in July; the latter was an eleventh hour notice to replace an indisposed baritone and save the night for Cinti-Domoreau who sang the Rosina.

De Begnis died in New York on 10 August 1849 after contracting cholera. Apparently he chose not to return to Europe by crossing the Atlantic again through fear of sea sickness. His obituary placed him at the same level of Lablache. According to a British magazine, de Begnis left a large fortune for unnamed heirs, and therefore the estate was passed on to the public administrator of New York, in default of a will. However, in November 1849, Giuseppina Ronzi de Begnis placed a claim on the husband's estate which was granted after her death to her daughter Clotilde Fraschini in September 1854.

== Sources ==
- Brodsky, Vera, (1988), Strong on Music: The New York Music Scene in the days of George Templeton Strong, Vol. 1. University of Chicago Press
- Coldham, Peter Wilson, (1989) American Wills and Administrations in the Prerogative Court of Canterbury 1610–1857, Baltimore.
- Castellani, Giuliano, (2009), Ferdinando Paer: Biografia, Opere e Documenti degli anni parigini, Bern: Peter Lang
- Ferner, Theodore (1994), Opera in London: Views of the Press, 1785–1830. Southern Illinois University. ISBN 0809319128
- Forbes, Elizabeth, (1998), “Begnis, Giuseppe de" in Stanley Sadie, (Ed.), The New Grove Dictionary of Opera, Vol. One. London: MacMillan Publishers, Inc. ISBN 0-333-73432-7 ISBN 1-56159-228-5
- Lablache Cheer, Clarissa, (2009), The Great Lablache: Nineteenth Century Operatic Superstar His Life and His Times, Xlibris, ISBN 9781441502155
- Levy, Richard N.; O'Rourke, J. (1880), Annals of the Theatre Royal, Dublin, from Its Opening in 1821 to Its Destruction by Fire, February, 1880; With Occasional Notes and Observations. Dublin. US: Nabu Press, 2010; UK: Read Books, 2008. ISBN 1177657759 ISBN 9781177657754
- Novello, J. Alfred (pub.) (1840), The Italian Opera in 1839: Its Latest Improvements and Existing Defects, Impartially Considered (1840). US: Kessinger Publishing, 2010. ISBN 1120891809 ISBN 9781120891808
- Opera Scotland: "Giuseppe de Begnis": details of his career in Scotland and elsewhere on operascotland.org.
- Osborne, Richard, (2007), Rossini, New York and Oxford: Oxford University Press. ISBN 978-0-19-518129-6
- Saintsbury, John H. (1827) A Dictionary of Musicians: from the Earliest Ages to the Present Time. Comprising the Most Important Biographical Contents of the works of Gerber, Choron, and Fayolle, Count Orloff, Dr. Burney, Sir John Hawkins, &c. &c.. London: Sainsbury and Co.
- Schiavo, Giovanni E. (1947), Italian-American History, Vol. I, New York
