= Giuseppina Ronzi de Begnis =

Italian opera singer

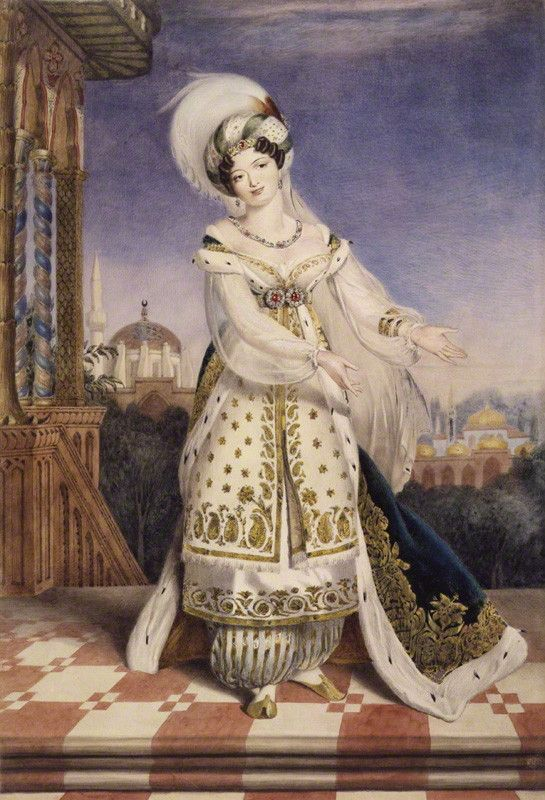
Portrait of Giuseppina de Begnis as Fatima in Rossini's oratorio Pietro L' Eremita (1828). The oratorio was a reworking of Mosè in Egitto.

Giuseppina Ronzi de Begnis (born Giuseppina Ronzi; Milan 11 January 1800 – died, Florence, 7 June 1853) was an Italian soprano opera singer famous for the roles written for her by the prominent composers of the 1820s and 1830s. Her father, Gaspare, was a prominent ballet dancer and choreographer, and her mother, Antonia, was a ballerina. Her brothers Stanislao and Pollione were opera singers. As a singer, she made her debut in Naples at the Teatro dei Fiorentini in 1814 in Giovanni Cordella's L'Avaro, followed by important engagements in Bologna in 1816, also appearing in Genoa, Florence; in 1817 as Giulia La Vestale, and in Bergamo. She married Italian bass Giuseppe de Begnis (1793–1849) when she was only 16. The marriage lasted only a few years and the two separated in 1825.

== Personality ==
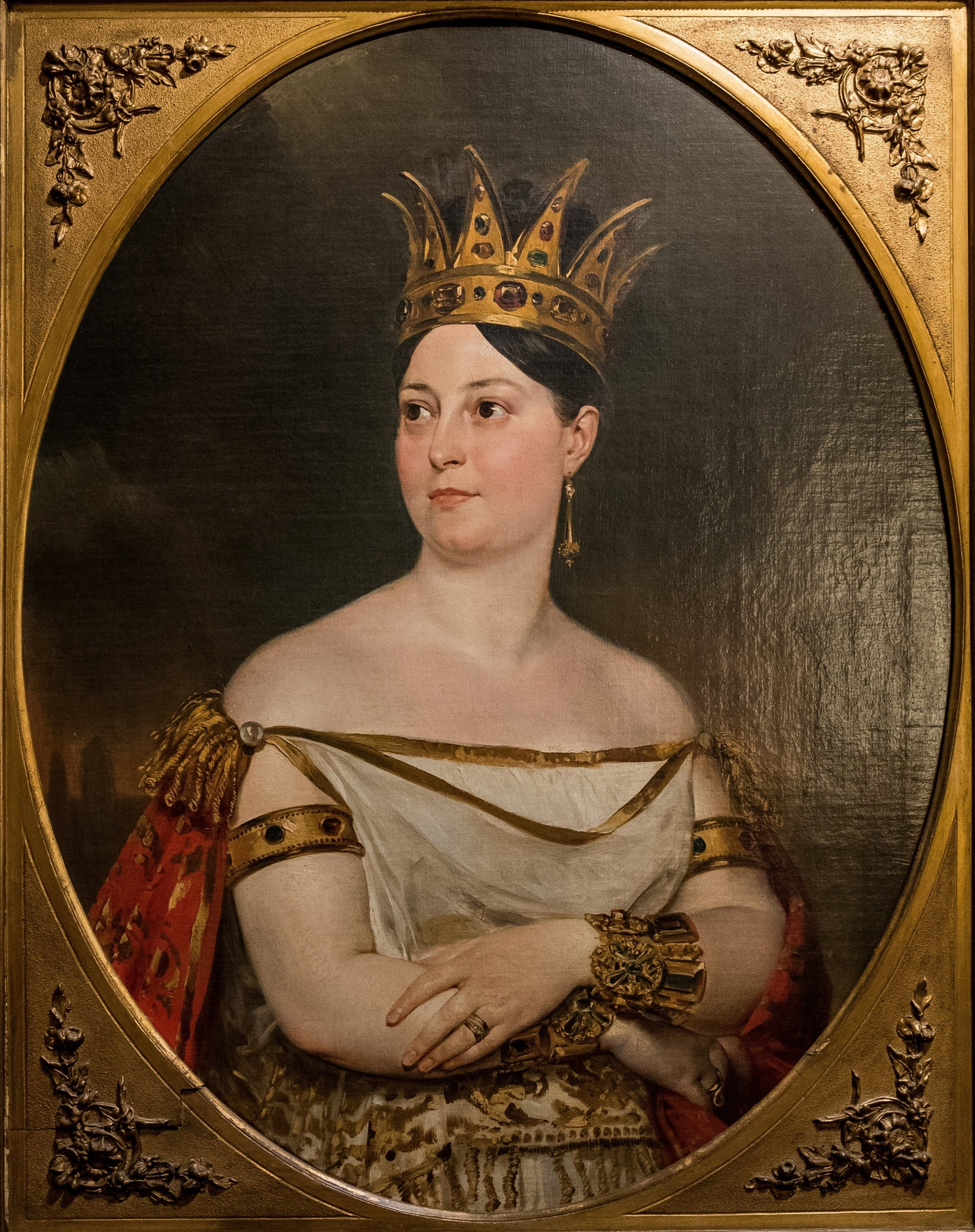
Giuseppina Ronzi de Begnis by Karl Briullov

Her figure has been described by her contemporaries, including Donizetti, as fat and voluptuous; a critic of Teatri di Milano wrote that "Ronzi was nevertheless a very beautiful figure on the stage, and for those who are not enemies of the flesh, she was very beautiful."

Shortly after her arrival in Paris, in August 1819, she became incensed when she learned that she was expected to sing Donna Anna in the upcoming production of Don Giovanni at the Opera instead of Zerlina. Ronzi was also known for her capricious attitudes and for having confrontations and arguments with female colleagues, including the famous altercation with Anna Del Sere during the rehearsals of Maria Stuarda. The two leading ladies took the heated match between the two crowned heads a step further, and when Ronzi overemphasized her response to Elisabetta with the famous “Vil bastarda” insult, a raging fight ensued. Donizetti might have fuelled the animosity between the two primadonnas when in response to an overheard comment by Ronzi that he “protected that whore of a Del Sere” he responded that he protected neither of them. Afterwards adding that "those two queens were whores, and you two are equally whores":

The rumbustious Ronzi De Begnis felt a bit ashamed but did not respond to the Maestro’s remarks and the rehearsal continued. Some reports published by a theatrical magazine would have us believe that Del Sere was badly bruised during the fight and needed to convalesce for two weeks. Be that as it may, these confrontations, although distorted in varying degrees by the contemporary media and later on by writers and biographers, did not help the staging of the new opera in Naples."

The incident was highly publicized and generated a scandal that prompted the censors to ban the libretto forcing Donizetti to make a last-minute change to the libretto and story-line to fit his music to a story of Florentine feuds in the 1200s re-titled Buondelmonte.

Her temperament notwithstanding, composers like Giovanni Pacini, Saverio Mercadante, Vincenzo Bellini and Gaetano Donizetti were fond of her. In a sonnet dedicated to "La Ronza", the highly acclaimed Roman poet Giuseppe Gioachino Belli, who had been mesmerized by her Norma, confirms her voluptuousness and its seductive effects on the public and concluded that the whole theatre seemed to waver: "Blessed be this witch who enchants us".

Shortly after her husband's death in New York, she retired from the stage. She died in Florence, in 1853 aged 53, leaving a substantial inheritance to her only child Clotilde who in 1843 had married the tenor Gaetano Fraschini. Clotilde was born in 1824 while De Begnis was engaged at the King's Theatre in London.

== Operatic career ==
=== Early encounter with Rossini ===
In 1818, Rossini secured her as Ninetta in his La gazza ladra for the grand inauguration of the newly built Teatro Nuovo in Pesaro. Rossini had grand ideas for the occasion and he wanted Isabella Colbran and Andrea Nozzari for a colossal production of his Armida; however budget constraints forced him to downsize his dreams, but when an attempt to secure his friend Rosa Morandi for La gazza ladra failed, he engaged Giuseppina Ronzi de Begnis and, at a reduced fee, her husband Giuseppe de Begnis as the Mayor. This move left him with enough money to engage a first-class tenor like Alberico Curioni.

=== Early years in Paris and London ===
In January 1819, Giuseppina and her husband moved to Paris where they sang for the re-opening of the Théâtre Italien in the Parisian premiere of Ferdinando Paër's drama semi-serio I Fuoriusciti di Firenze on 20 March. The opera received a good review in Le Moniteur Universel, and the Journal de Paris praised Giuseppe for his Uberto and Giuseppina for her Isabella. In the meantime Rossini had been informed that the de Begnises had been secured for La gazza ladra. The prospects were encouraging and on 5 May the couple sang in Pietro Alessandro Guglielmi's La pastorella nobile. Positive reviews greeted the couple during the summer of the same year when they sang in Il matrimonio segreto and Rossini's Il turco in Italia. In Paris she appeared as Susanna in Le Nozze di Figaro, and Rosina in Il barbiere di Siviglia. She capitalized on her Parisian sojourn and found time to study with Pierre Garat honing buffo roles of Paisiello and Mozart.

In 1822, she went to London, where she obtained brilliant successes at the King's Theatre, notably in Pietro l'Eremita (an oratorio version of Mose in Egitto) on 30 January 1822, Rossini's La donna del lago and the title role in his Matilde di Shabran. Other Rossini successes in London included Fiorilla in Il Turco in Italia and Amenaide in Tancredi.

=== In Italy ===
Ronzi returned to Italy in 1825, her marriage fell apart, and she might have had problems with her voice. For the next five years, she worked hard to refine her technique and extension until she became a soprano sfogato like Grisi, Ungher, Malibran, and Pasta. On 13 April 1831 the Milanese newspaper L'Eco announced her return to Naples to restart her operatic career. She was engaged at the San Carlo in Naples, where she also won considerable acclaim in roles Donizetti wrote specifically for her. Ronzi's biggest triumph in Naples was her performances as the title character in Rossini's Semiramide; in Rome, in 1834, she earned equally remarkable success in her first Norma at the Teatro Apollo. Her debut at Milan's La Scala took place in 1834, when she successfully sang the title role in Donizetti's Gemma di Vergy. She had repeated curtain calls and a critic wrote that her "demeanour was noble, natural and dignified without exaggeration and affectation, her accent was beautiful, crisp and expressive; her singing all Italian and of the best school."

1834 was possibly her most memorable year because she also had great success in Rome in her first Anna Bolena, and in Florence, she charmed the public with her Romeo in Bellini's I Capuleti e i Montecchi as well as Desdemona in Rossini's Otello – a role she had already sung in Naples.

=== Working with Donizetti ===
Donizetti created the leading roles in five very important operas specifically for her: Fausta, Sancia di Castiglia, Maria Stuarda, Gemma di Vergy, and Roberto Devereux. Her Elisabetta in Roberto Devereux received rave reviews and on the second night, 15 November 1837, a critic wrote that "the applauses started with Ronzi de Begnis' entrance and ended with the rondò at the end of the opera." Her repertory included other operas by Donizetti such as L'assedio di Calais, L'esule di Roma, Parisina, Pia de' Tolomei, and Belisario.

Next to Henriette Sontag, Ronzi was considered the best Donna Anna and the best Norma after Giuditta Pasta. In fact, for almost a decade (1834–1843) she was a most successful and reliable Norma. Bellini was quite happy with her technique and in 1834 he was contemplating writing an opera for the San Carlo starring Ronzi de Begnis.
