= Gemma di Vergy =

Opera by Gaetano Donizetti

- Opera by Gaetano Donizetti
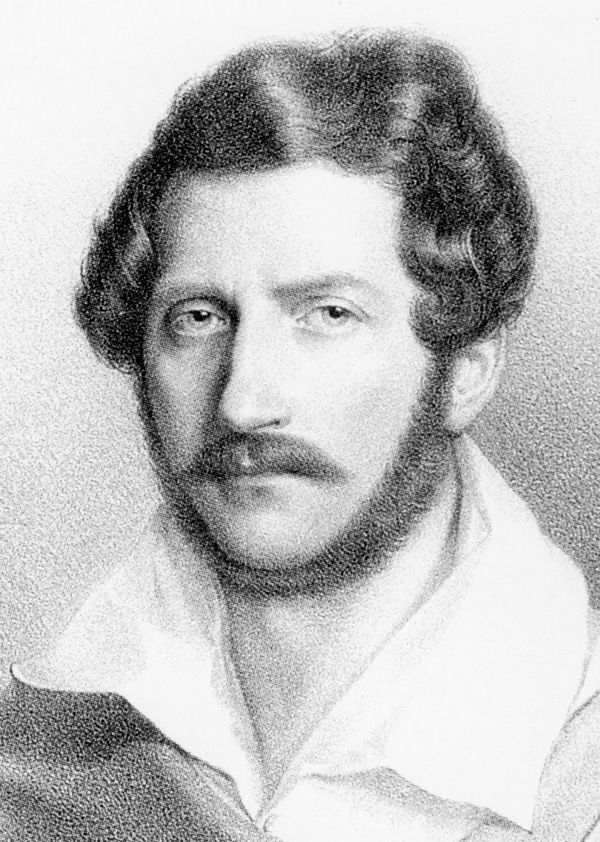
- Gaetano Donizetti c. 1835
- Librettist: Giovanni Emanuele Bidera
- Language: Italian
- Based on: Charles VII chez ses grands vassaux by Alexandre Dumas père
- Premiere: 26 December 1834; La Scala, Milan

Gemma di Vergy is an 1834 tragedia lirica (tragic opera) in two acts by Gaetano Donizetti from a libretto by Giovanni Emanuele Bidera. It is based on the tragedy Charles VII chez ses grands vassaux (Charles VII and His Chief Vassals) (1831) by Alexandre Dumas père, (This later became the basis of the opera The Saracen by the Russian composer César Cui.)

The heroine is the childless wife of the Count of Vergy, and the plot deals with her jealousy and grief as her husband arranges an annulment of their marriage in preparation for the arrival of his new bride, Ida, and her despair following the murder of her husband by a slave, Tamas, who is secretly in love with her.

Gemma di Vergy was first performed on 26 December 1834 at the La Scala, Milan. The leading role was taken by the Italian soprano Giuseppina Ronzi de Begnis, Donizetti's favourite prima donna at the time, for whom he had previously composed Fausta (1832 ), and for whom he was later to compose Roberto Devereux (1837).

== Performance history ==
The opera remained very popular in Italy until at least the 1860s. It was not performed at the Teatro di San Carlo in Naples until 4 March 1837, but it remained popular there and appeared every year until 1848. Productions were also staged in London on 12 March 1842, Paris, New York City on 2 October 1843, Lisbon, St. Petersburg, Vienna and Barcelona. While initially popular, it had disappeared from the repertoire by about 1900, although before its 20th-century revivals, it was staged in Empoli in 1901.

Gemma di Vergy was revived for the soprano Montserrat Caballé in a production at the Teatro San Carlo in Naples in December 1975. Subsequently, the same soprano performed the work in concert in several other cities. A number of live recordings exist of the Caballé performances from Naples, Paris and New York.

== Roles ==
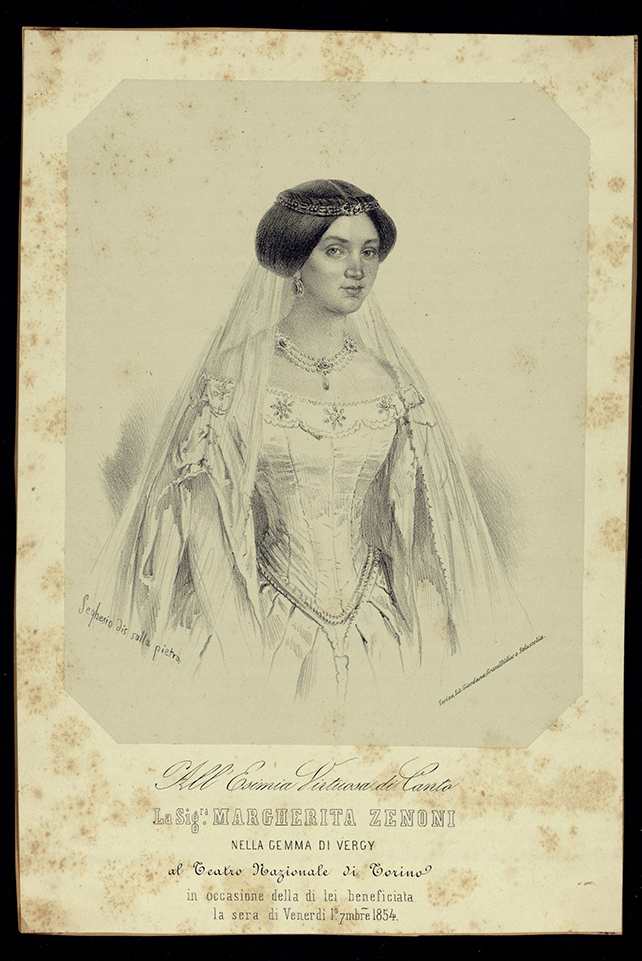
Gemma di Vergy, drawing for Gemma di Vergy (1854).

Role	Voice type	Premiere Cast, 26 December 1834 (Conductor: - Eugenio Cavallini)
Earl of Vergy	baritone	Giovanni Orazio Cartagenova
Gemma	soprano	Giuseppina Ronzi de Begnis
Ida di Greville	soprano	Felicita Baillou-Hillaret
Tamas	tenor	Domenico Reina
Guido	bass	Ignazio Marini
Rolando	bass	Domenico Spiaggi
Knights, archers, soldiers, bridesmaids

== Recordings ==
Year	Cast (Gemma, Ida, Tamas, Conte di Vergy)	Conductor, Opera House and Orchestra	Label
1975	Montserrat Caballé, Biancamaria Casoni, Giorgio Lamberti, Renato Bruson	Armando Gatto; Teatro San Carlo, Naples Orchestra and Chorus	Audio CD: Opera d'Oro; Cat: OPD 1379
1976	Montserrat Caballé, Natalya Chudy, Luis Lima, Louis Quilico, Paul Plishka (Guido)	Eve Queler, New York Opera Orchestra, Schola Cantorum (New York)	Audio LP: Columbia, (first issue on CD Sony 2017)
1987	Adriana Maliponte, Nucci Condò, Ottavio Garaventa, Luigi De Corato	Gert Meditz; Teatro Gaetano Donizetti, RAI Milano Orchestra and Chorus	DVD: House of Opera; Cat: DVDCC 601
