= Giovanni Emanuele Bidera =

Italian writer (1784–1858)

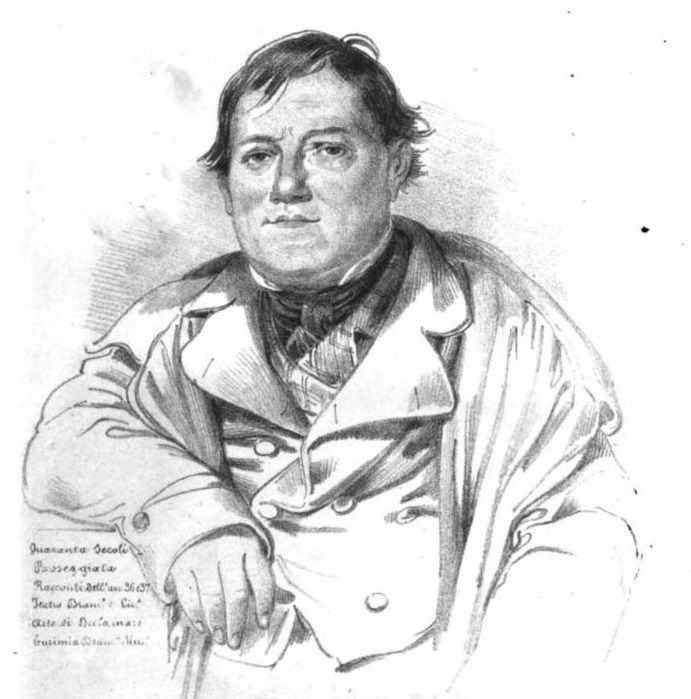
- Born: 4 October 1784; Palazzo Adriano, Kingdom of Sicily
- Died: 8 April 1858 (aged 73); Palermo, Kingdom of the Two Sicilies
- Occupations: Librettist and playwright

Giovanni Emanuele Bidera (or Bideri) (Note: The family surname was variously recorded as "Bideri" or "Bidera" in 18th- and 19th-century documents. Giovanni Emanuele Bidera used "Bidera" on his published works until 1854 when he and his family definitively adopted the "Bideri" form.) (4 October 1784 – 8 April 1858) was an Italian writer.

He is primarily known as the librettist of Gaetano Donizetti's operas Gemma di Vergy and Marino Faliero, but he also wrote many other librettos for lesser known composers as well as plays, essays, books about Naples, and a treatise on acting. Bidera was born in the small Sicilian town of Palazzo Adriano and spent most of his career in Naples. In 1850 he retired to Palermo where he died at the age of 73.

== Biography ==
Bidera was born in Palazzo Adriano, now a commune of Palermo. His family was part of the Arbëreshë community of Sicily. According to the Dizionario Biografico degli Italiani, his family were of humble origins. However, according to a 1986 article on Bidera's life and work written by his great-great-grandson, Luciano Villevieille Bideri, the Bideri were a noble family who later fell on hard times. Bidera was one of the seven children of Baroness Anna Dara and Count Pietro Atanasio Bideri. (Note: According to Luciano Villevieille Bideri, the full name of Bidera's father was Atanasio Bideri Masarechio Castriota Scanderberg Lopez Sanseverino, Baron of Tanai, Count of San Pieri, Marquess of Montesano.) In his childhood and adolescence, the family owned a large palazzo on the Piazza Beati Paoli in Palermo and another in Palazzo Adriano on the main piazza (now called Piazza Umberto I) as well as numerous houses and land in the town and its surroundings. Because of his father's support for King Ferdinand IV, the family lost virtually all their holdings when the king was deposed in 1806.

Giovanni Emanuele did not share his father's conservative views and support for the Bourbon rulers of Sicily and Naples which caused considerable friction between them. In 1799 and in the hope of modifying the young man's revolutionary sympathies, his father had sent him to the Eastern Rite seminary in Palermo. However, the seminary brought him into contact with other young men who shared his views and reinforced them. After yet another serious quarrel with his father, he ran away at the age of 18 intending study law at the university in Naples. Unable to make a living there and deeply in debt, he went back to Sicily and worked as an actor and set designer for a traveling theatre troupe. He also began writing plays.

During his various peregrinations with the theatre troupe, which also included multiple sojourns in Naples, he met Giacoma Schultz, a Sicilian woman of Swiss origin. They married in 1812 and over the next 20 years had five children. Bidera and his young family settled in Naples in the late 1820s where he published a treatise on acting and found a congenial atmosphere in a musical circle called I Trascendentali. Several of his plays had also been published in Naples and Felice Romani encouraged him to try his hand at writing librettos. He provided a new libretto for the 1832 revival in Genoa of Saverio Mercadante's opera Gabriella di Vergy and contributed the synopsis for Salvadore Cammarano's libretto to Persiani's Ines de Castro. Bidera and Cammarano were subsequently involved in a year-long battle with the Neapolitan censors before the opera finally premiered in 1835. For Donizetti, he provided the complete librettos for Gemma di Vergy which premiered in 1834 and Marino Faliero which premiered the following year.

The success of the Donizetti operas led to Bidera being appointed as a house librettist at the Teatro San Carlo where between 1835 and 1838 he wrote the librettos for operas by Carlo Coccia, Giuseppe Lillo, and Giuseppe Balducci. After his work at the Teatro San Carlo, he produced the librettos for a number of other operas by now-forgotten composers, but which had performances in Naples, Milan, and Venice. During his time in Naples, he also published Il colera in Napoli, a collection of vignettes from the 1836 cholera epidemic there and Passeggiata per Napoli e contorni, a two-volume description of the city, its surroundings, and the customs of its people.

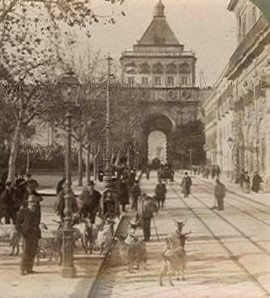
Via Toledo in Palermo where Bidera spent the last years of his life in an apartment at number 76.

Suspected of involvement in the 1848 uprisings in Naples, Bidera was required by police order to leave the city. Leaving his family behind in Naples, he retired to Palermo in 1850. He opened an acting school there and devoted himself to research in philosophy and linguistics, writing occasional pieces for the Sicilian journals L'Armonia and Il Poligrafo. In 1854 he published Teatro edito ed inedito, a collection of ten plays, some of which had been previously published. It marked the first time that his surname was given as "Bideri" in his published writings. The book began with a four-line autobiographical poem:

I lived a time of pleasure more than pain;
I was a dramatic actor and then a writer;
Amidst ancient memories, I now partake in
Old age, I think, I take walks and I smoke. (Note: Original Italian: Vissi un tempo al piacer più che al dolore; Fui un Drammatico Attor, poscia scrittore; Fra le memorie antiche ora consumo La vecchia età, penso, passeggio, e fumo.)

Bidera died in Palermo at the age of 73, leaving an unfinished science fiction novel entitled Storia ideale di 40 secoli (Ideal History of 40 Centuries). Shortly after his death, the composer and writer Marco Marcelliano Marcello wrote in the Gazzetta musicale di Milano:

I will not see him again, that good old man, with a spent cigar stub between his teeth, poor but happy; friend of the young, as I had been in Naples. I spent so many hours of the day, or rather the night, listening to the thoughts on philosophy and poetry which flowed from his lips, burning like the rivers of lava that flowed from his homeland's Mount Etna, and which I have always treasured and still remember! (Note: Original Italian: "Io non lo vedrò più, quel buon vecchierello, col suo mozzicone di zigaro spento fra i denti, povero ma lieto; amico dei giovani, come io era in quel tempo che a Napoli passai seco tante ore del giorno, o a meglio dire della notte; pendendo dalla sua bocca a udire i suoi ragionari filosofici e poetici, che gli fluivano dalle labbra, ardenti come i fiumi di lava dell' Etna suo paterno: dei quali ho fatto sempre tesoro e ricordo tuttavia!")

In the 1870s Bidera's grandson Ferdinando re-published some of Bidera's more obscure works. The first was a bizarre tract written in 1853 on musical and dramatic eurythmy and its relation to the laws of physics. It took the form of a series of letters written by Bidera to a "mademoiselle Sofia". The second, under the title Triade, contained an essay on the philosophy of Pythagoras, originally published in Il Poligrafo in 1856 and included others on Plato and Timaeus of Locri which had appeared in Bidera's Quaranta secoli, racconti su le Due Sicilie del Pelasgo Matn-Eer, originally published in 1849.

== Descendants ==
Bidera and his wife had five children. The eldest was Pietro Atanasio, born in 1813. Bidera continued the family tradition of naming the eldest son after the paternal grandfather despite the fact that he never reconciled with his father and never saw him again after he ran away in 1802. Pietro Atanasio was followed by Amalia (who died at the age of 12), Francesca, Luigi, and Francesco. Pietro Atanasio initially worked as a tax officer for the government of Ferdinand II, but was dismissed from that post around the time his father was exiled from Naples. After that he devoted himself to republishing his father's works and later founded and ran La Pubblicità Universale, a commercial newspaper published in five languages with an associated advertising agency. His son Ferdinando Bideri (1851–1930) founded the famous publishing house, known today as Gruppo Editoriale Bideri. Francesco (1833–1894) worked in Naples as an artist, sculptor, cameo engraver, and furniture designer. He also played the mandolin and served as a music teacher to Margherita of Savoy who wanted to learn the instrument. He published several transcriptions of opera arias for mandolin and piano, including pieces from the two Donizetti operas for which his father had written the librettos.

== Works ==
=== Opera librettos ===
- I promessi sposi (melodramma semiserio in 2 acts) composed by Luigi Gervasi, premiered Rome, Teatro Valle, 19 January 1834
- Gemma di Vergy (tragedia lirica in 2 acts) composed by Gaetano Donizetti, premiered Milan, Teatro alla Scala, 26 December 1834
- Marino Faliero (tragedia lirica in 3 acts) composed by Gaetano Donizetti, premiered Paris, Théâtre-Italien, 12 March 1835
- Marfa (melodramma in 4 acts) composed by Carlo Coccia, premiered Naples, Teatro San Carlo, 13 July 1835
- Marco Visconti (tragedia lirica in 2 acts) composed by Saverio Mercadante, premiered Naples, Teatro San Carlo, 7 September 1835
- Lara (tragedia lirica in 2 acts) composed by Henri de Ruolz-Montchal, premiered Naples, Teatro San Carlo, 22 November 1835
- Odda di Bernaver (opera seria in 2 acts) composed by Giuseppe Lillo, premiered Naples, Teatro San Carlo, 28 February 1837
- La battaglia di Navarino (opera seria in 2 acts) composed by Giuseppe Staffa, premiered Naples, Teatro San Carlo, 25 January 1838
- I pirati spagnuoli (melodramma in 2 acts) composed by Errico Petrella, premiered Naples, Teatro Nuovo, 13 May 1838
- Bianca Turenga (melodramma in 3 acts) composed by Giuseppe Balducci, premiered Naples, Teatro San Carlo, 11 August 1838
- Le miniere di Freinbergh (melodramma in 2 acts) composed by Errico Petrella, premiered Naples, Teatro Nuovo, 16 February 1839
- Le due epoche ossia l'astuccio d'oro (melodramma semiserio in 2 acts) composed by Filippo Falangola, premiered Naples, Teatro del Fondo, Spring 1839
- Ricciarda (tragedia lirica in 2 acts) composed by Prospero Selli, premiered Naples, Teatro San Carlo, Summer 1839
- I pirati (melodramma eroicomico in 2 acts) composed by Adelaide Orsola Appignani, premiered Rome, Teatro Alibert, 19 March 1843
- Adolfo di Gerval ossia I montanari scozzesi (azione lirica romantica in 3 acts) composed by Aurelio Bruno, premiered Naples, Teatro del Fondo, 20 July 1843
- Fenicia (tragedia lirica in 3 acts) composed by Francesco Chiaromonte, premiered Naples, Teatro del Fondo, 1844
- Costanza d'Aragona (melodramma in 3 acts) composed by Salvatore Sarmiento, premiered Naples, Teatro San Carlo, 12 December 1844
- Le nozze di Messina (tragedia lirica in 4 acts) composed by Francesco Chiaromonte, premiered Venice, La Fenice, 18 March 1852
- Elena Castriota, o La Saracena (tragedia lirica in 3 acts) composed by Andrea Butera, premiered Palermo, Teatro Carolino, 9 February 1854
- Ericarda di Wargas (opera in 4 acts) composed by Mario Michielli, premiered Pisa, Regio Teatro Nuovo 16 April 1881

=== Plays ===
- La divisione de' beni (drama in 5 acts), published in 1820
- I dilettanti comici de' piccoli paesi (comedy in 5 acts), published in 1827 and based on his experiences as an actor
- Il castello del principe (comedy in 4 acts), published in 1827
- La tragicomania (comedy in 4 acts), published in 1827
- Corinna al Campidoglio (drama in 5 acts), published in 1827 and based on Madame de Staël's novel Corinne ou l'Italie
- I trovatori fanatici (comedy in 4 acts), published in 1827
- Alessandro re de' Molossi a Pandosia (tragedy in 5 acts), published in 1854
- I sibariti (tragedy in 5 acts), published in 1854
- Il giorno di pesto (tragedy in 5 acts), published in 1854
- Alarico primo re de' Visigoti (tragedy in 5 acts), published in 1854
