= La sonnambula =

1831 opera by Vincenzo Bellini

- Opera by Vincenzo Bellini
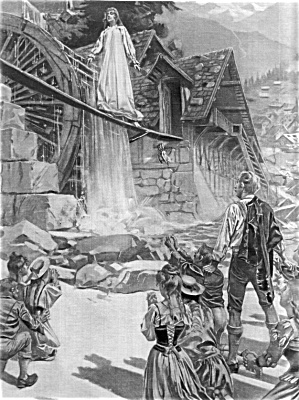
- The sleepwalker in act 2, sc. 2, (William de Leftwich Dodge, 1899)
- Librettist: Felice Romani
- Language: Italian
- Based on: La somnambule, ou L'arrivée d'un nouveau seigneur by Eugène Scribe and Jean-Pierre Aumer
- Premiere: 6 March 1831; Teatro Carcano, Milan

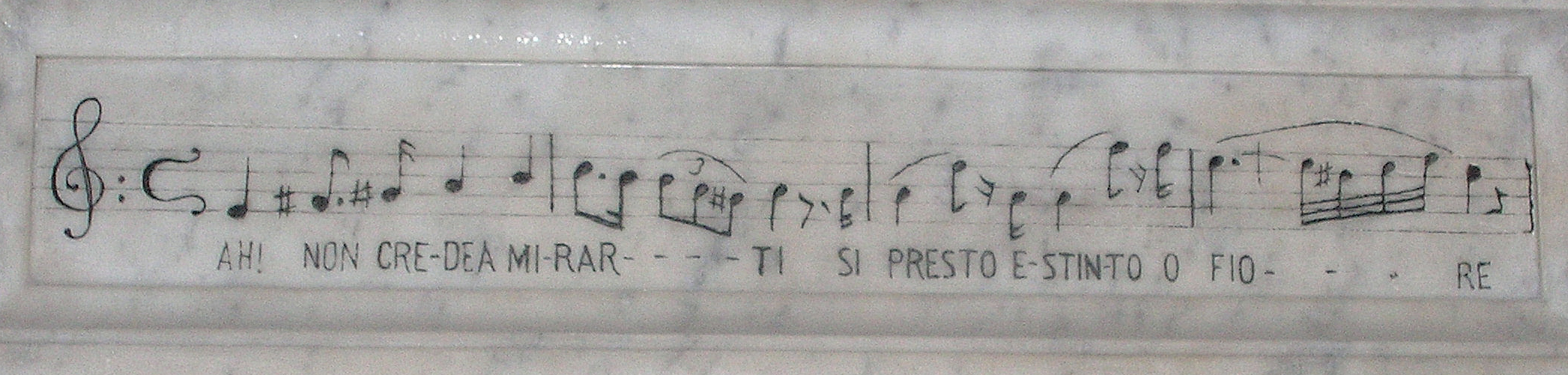
Ah! non credea mirarti / Sì presto estinto, o fiore [I did not believe you would fade so soon, oh flower] from act 2, scene 2, of La sonnambula appears on Bellini's tomb in the Catania Cathedral, Sicily

La sonnambula (Italian pronunciation: [la sonˈnambula]; The Sleepwalker) is an opera semiseria in two acts, with music in the bel canto tradition by Vincenzo Bellini set to an Italian libretto by Felice Romani, based on a scenario for a ballet-pantomime written by Eugène Scribe and choreographed by Jean-Pierre Aumer called La somnambule, ou L'arrivée d'un nouveau seigneur. The ballet had premiered in Paris in September 1827 at the height of a fashion for stage works incorporating somnambulism.

The role of Amina was originally written for the soprano sfogato Giuditta Pasta, but during Bellini's lifetime another soprano sfogato, Maria Malibran, was a notable exponent of the role. The first performance took place at the Teatro Carcano in Milan on 6 March 1831.

The majority of twentieth-century recordings have been made with a soprano cast as Amina, usually with added top-notes and other changes according to tradition, although it was written for the soprano sfogato voice (not be confused with the modern mezzo, nonexistent at the time) who sang soprano and contralto roles unmodified.

The phrase Ah! non credea mirarti / Sì presto estinto, o fiore [I did not believe I would see you fade so soon, oh flower] from Amina's final aria is inscribed on Bellini's tomb in the Catania Cathedral in Sicily.

== Composition history ==
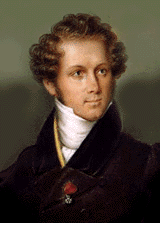
Vincenzo Bellini by Natale Schiavoni

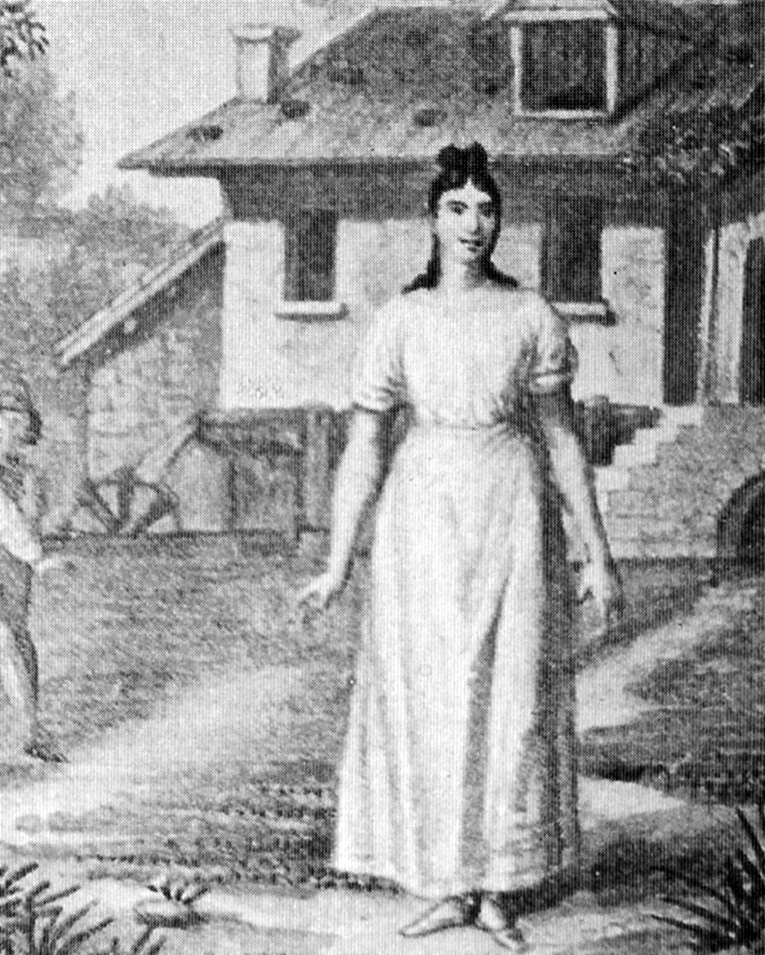
Giuditta Pasta as Amina, May 1831 premiere

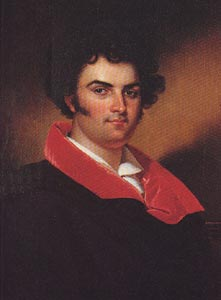
Tenor Giovanni Battista Rubini sang Elvino

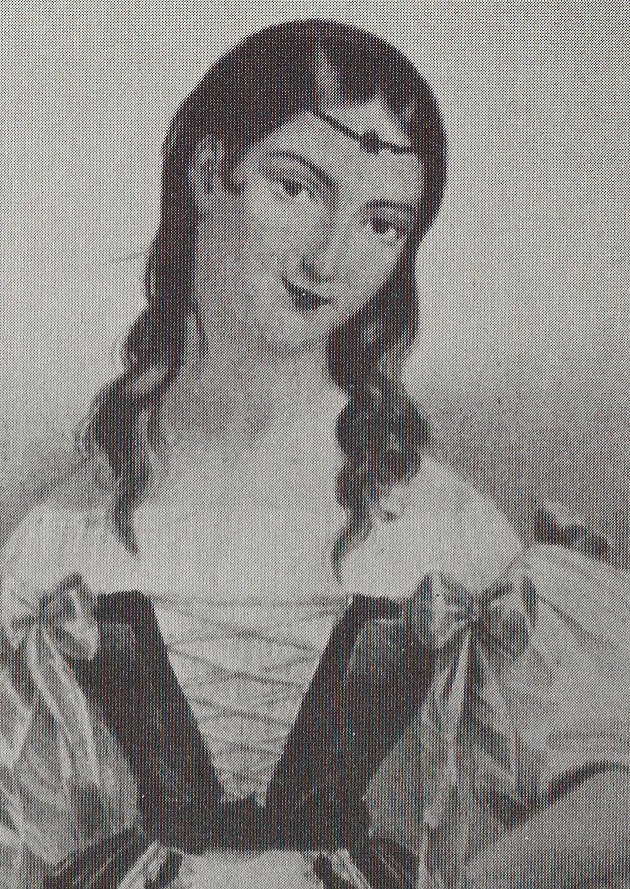
Maria Malibran as Amina, London 1833

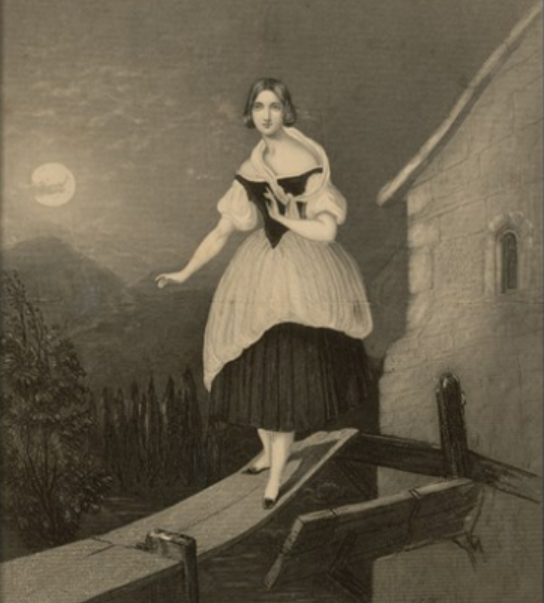
Jenny Lind in La sonnambula, 1840s

Returning to Milan after the I Capuleti e i Montecchi performances in March 1830, little occurred until the latter part of April when Bellini was able to negotiate a contract with both the Milan house for the autumn of 1831 and another for the 1832 Carnival season at La Fenice in Venice; these operas were to become Norma for La Scala and Beatrice di Tenda for Venice. Writing to his uncle in Sicily, the composer reported that "I shall earn almost twice as much as if I had composed [only for the Venetian impresario]".

However, there was also a contract for a second Milan house for the following winter season for as-yet an unnamed opera, but it had already been agreed that Giuditta Pasta, who had achieved success in Milan in 1829 and 1830 appearing in several major operas, would be the principal artist.

Then Bellini experienced the re-occurrence of an illness which had emerged in Venice due to pressure of work and the bad weather, and which consistently recurred after each opera. The gastro-enteric condition—which he described as "a tremendous inflammatory gastric bilious fever"— resulted in his being cared for by friends. It was not until the summer, when he went to stay near Lake Como, that the pressure to decide upon a subject for the following winter's opera became more urgent. That Pasta owned a house near Como and would be staying there over the summer was the reason that Felice Romani traveled to meet both her and Bellini.

By 15 July they had decided on a subject for early 1831, but it was uncertain as to whether Pasta was interested in singing a trousers role, that of the protagonist, Ernani, in an adaptation of Victor Hugo's Hernani, later set to music by Giuseppe Verdi in 1844. With both men having various other commitments, by the end of November 1830 nothing had been achieved in the way of writing either the libretto or the score of Ernani but, by January, the situation and the subject had changed. Bellini wrote that "[Romani] is now writing La sonnambula, ossia I Due Fidanzati svezzeri...It must go on stage on 20 February at the latest."

That music which he was beginning to use for Ernani was transferred to Sonnambula is not in doubt, and, as Weinstock comments, "he was as ready as most other composers of his era to reuse in a new situation musical passages created for a different, earlier one".

During Bellini's lifetime another sfogato, Maria Malibran, was to become a notable exponent of the role of Amina.

== Performance history ==
=== 19th century ===
With its pastoral setting and story, La sonnambula was an immediate success and is still regularly performed. The title role of Amina (the sleepwalker) with its high tessitura is renowned for its difficulty, requiring a complete command of trills and florid technique, but it fitted Pasta's vocal capabilities, her soprano also having been described as a soprano sfogato, one which designates a contralto who is capable—by sheer industry or natural talent—of extending her upper range and being able to encompass the coloratura soprano tessitura.

The opera's premiere performance took place on 6 March 1831, a little later than the original date. Its success was partly due to the differences between Romani's earlier libretti and this one, as well as "the accumulation of operatic experience which both [Bellini] and Romani had brought to its creation." Press reactions were universally positive, as was that of the Russian composer, Mikhail Glinka, who attended and wrote overwhelmingly enthusiastically:

Pasta and Rubini sang with the most evident enthusiasm to support their favourite conductor [sic]; the second act the singers themselves wept and carried the audience along with them.

After its premiere, the opera was performed in London on 28 July 1831 at the King's Theatre and in New York on 13 November 1835 at the Park Theatre. Herbert Weinstock provides a comprehensive year-by-year listing of performances following the premiere and then, with some gaps, all the way up to 1900.

Later, it was a vehicle for showcasing Jenny Lind, Emma Albani and—in the early 20th century—for Lina Pagliughi and Toti Dal Monte.

=== 20th and 21st centuries ===
Weinstock gave an account of performances starting in 1905. Stagings were presented as frequently as every two years in one European or North American venue or another, and they continued through the 1950s bel canto revivals up to the publication of his book in 1971. The opera was rescued from the ornamental excesses and misrepresentations more similar to the baroque style than the bel canto of Bellini when it was sung by Maria Callas in the now-famous 1955 production by Luchino Visconti at La Scala.

Contributing to the revivals were Joan Sutherland's taking the role of Amina at Covent Garden in 1961 and at the Metropolitan Opera in 1963, where the role become one of her most significant successes.

While not part of the standard repertory, La sonnambula is performed reasonably frequently in the 21st century. It has been given three productions with Natalie Dessay, the first at the Santa Fe Opera in 2004, the second in Paris in January/February 2010, and the third at the Metropolitan Opera in 2009, a production which was revived in Spring 2014 with Diana Damrau singing the role of Amina. A production was mounted by The Royal Opera in London in 2011, by the Salzburger Landestheater in Salzburg 2015, and by the Staatstheater am Gärtnerplatz in Munich in 2015/2016. The first mezzo-soprano to record the role was Frederica von Stade in 1980, followed by Cecilia Bartoli. Most recently, American soprano Nadine Sierra was featured as Amina in the Metropolitan Opera's new production of the opera during the 2025-26 season.

== Roles ==
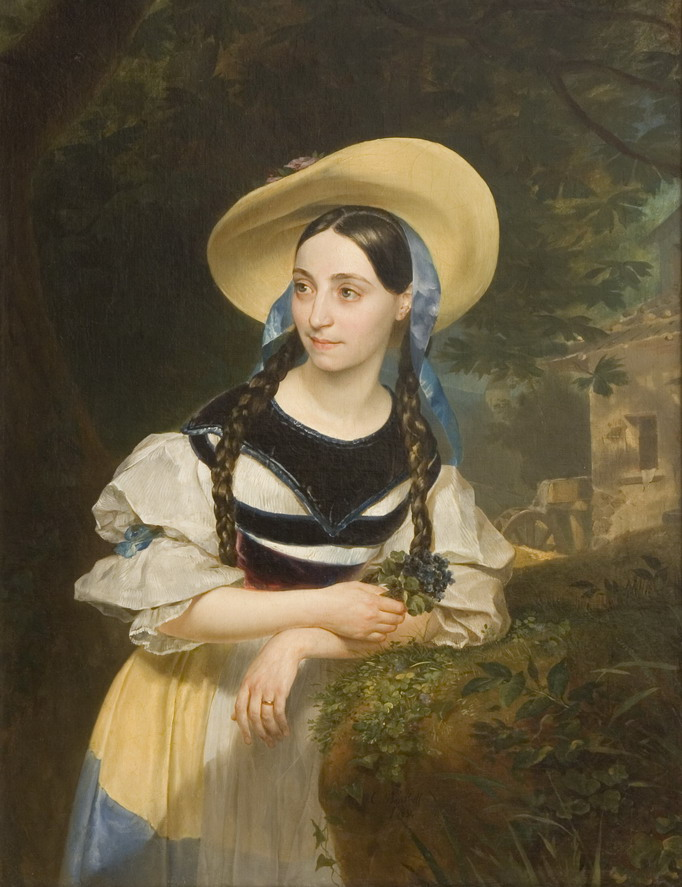
Fanny Tacchinardi Persiani as Amina by Karl Bryullov, 1834

Roles, voice types, premiere cast
Role	Voice type	Premiere cast, 6 March 1831 Conductor: Nicola Zamboni Petrini
Count Rodolfo	bass	Luciano Mariani
Amina	soprano	Giuditta Pasta
Elvino	tenor	Giovanni Battista Rubini
Lisa	soprano	Elisa Taccani
Teresa	mezzo-soprano	Felicita Baillou-Hilaret
Alessio	bass	Lorenzo Biondi
Notary	tenor	Antonio Crippa
Villagers – Chorus

== Synopsis ==
Place: Switzerland
Time: Indeterminate

=== Act 1 ===
Scene 1: A village, a mill in the background

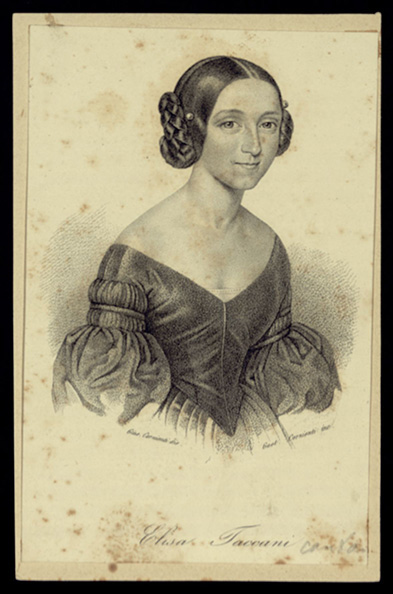
Elisa Taccani, who created the role of Lisa, by Giuseppe Cornienti

As the betrothal procession of Amina and Elvino approaches, the villagers all proclaiming joy for Amina, Lisa, the proprietress of the inn, comes outside expressing her misery: Tutto è gioia, tutto è festa...Sol per me non non v'ha contento / "All is joy and merriment... I alone am miserable". She is consumed with jealousy for she had once been betrothed to Elvino and had been abandoned by him in favour of Amina. The lovelorn Alessio arrives, but she rejects his advances. All assembled proclaim the beauty of Amina: In Elvezia non v'ha rosa / fresca e cara al par d'Amina / "In Switzerland there is no flower sweeter, dearer than Amina". Then Amina comes out of the mill with her adoptive mother, Teresa, the mill owner. Amina thanks her, also expressing her thanks to her assembled friends for their kind wishes. (Aria: Come per me sereno / oggi rinacque il di! / "How brightly this day dawned for me".) Additionally, she thanks Alessio, who tells her that he has composed the wedding song and organised the celebrations; she wishes him well in his courtship of Lisa, but Lisa cynically rejects the idea of love. Elvino arrives, exclaiming Perdona, o mia diletta / "Forgive me my beloved", and explaining that he had to stop on his way at his mother's grave to ask her blessing on Amina. As they exchange vows, the notary asks what she brings to the partnership: "Only my heart" she answers at which Elvino's exclaims: "Ah the heart is everything!". (Elvino's aria, then Amina, then all express their love and their joy: Prendi: l'anel ti dono / che un dì recava all'ara / "Here, receive this ring that the beloved spirit who smiled upon our love wore at the altar".)

The sound of horses' hooves and a cracking whip is heard. A stranger arrives, asking the way to the castle. Lisa points out that it is getting late and he will not reach it before dark and she offers him lodging at her inn. When he says that he knows the inn, all are surprised. (Rodolfo's aria: Vi ravviso, o luoghi ameni, / in cui lieti, in cui sereni / "O lovely scenes, again I see you, / where in serenity I spent the calm and happy days of my earliest youth".) The newcomer, who surprises the villagers by his familiarity with the locality, asks about the celebrations and admires Amina, who reminds him of a girl he had loved long ago. (Tu non sai con quei begli occhi / come dolce il cor mi tocchi / "You can't know how those dear eyes gently touch my heart, what adorable beauty".) He admits to having once stayed in the castle, whose lord has been dead for four years. When Teresa explains that his son had vanished some years previously, the stranger assures them that he is alive and will return. As darkness approaches the villagers warn him that it is time to be indoors to avoid the village phantom: A fosco cielo, a notte bruna,/ al fioco raggio d'incerta luna / "When the sky is dark at night, and the moon's rays are weak, at the gloomy thunder's sound [...] a shade appears." Not being superstitious, he assures them that they will soon be free of the apparition. Elvino is jealous of the stranger's admiration of Amina; he is jealous even of the breezes that caress her, but he promises her he will reform. (Duet finale, Elvino and Amina: Son geloso del zefiro errante / che ti scherza col crin e col velo / "I envy the wandering breeze that plays with your hair, your veil").

Scene 2: A room in the inn

Lisa enters Rodolfo's room to see if all is well. She reveals that his identity is known to all as Rodolfo, the long-lost son of the count. She advises him that the village is preparing a formal welcome; meanwhile she wishes to be the first to pay her respects. She is flattered when he begins a flirtation with her, but runs out at the sound of people approaching, dropping her handkerchief which the Count picks up. He sees the approaching phantom whom he recognises as Amina. She enters the room, walking in her sleep, all the while calling for Elvino and asking where he is. Realising that her nocturnal wanderings have given rise to the story of the village phantom, Rodolfo is about to take advantage of her helpless state. But then he is struck by her obvious innocence and refrains: (Scene: first Rodolfo: O ciel! che tento / "God! What am I doing?"; then, separately, Amina: Oh! come lieto è il popolo / "How happy all the people are, accompanying us to the church"; then together.) Amina continues her sleepwalk and falls asleep on the sofa, but Rodolfo hears the sound of people approaching and, with no other way out, he climbs out of the window.

Amina continues to sleep on the sofa as the villagers arrive at the inn. Lisa enters and points to Amina, who wakes up at the noise. Elvino, believing her faithless, rejects Amina in fury. Only Teresa, her adoptive mother, believes in her innocence: Ensemble finale, first Amina D'un pensiero e d'un accento / "In my thought or in my words never, never have I sinned"; then Elvino: Voglia il cielo che il duol ch'io sento / "Heaven keep you from feeling ever the pain that I feel now!"; then the people and Lisa, the former proclaiming her treachery, Teresa pleading for her to be allowed to explain. Elvino then exclaims that there will be no wedding, and each expresses his or her emotional reaction to this discovery.

=== Act 2 ===
Scene 1: A wood

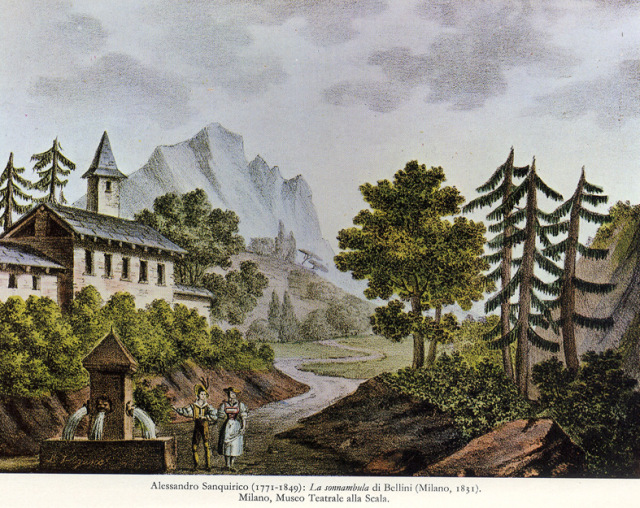
Alessandro Sanquirico's set design for act 2 scene 1

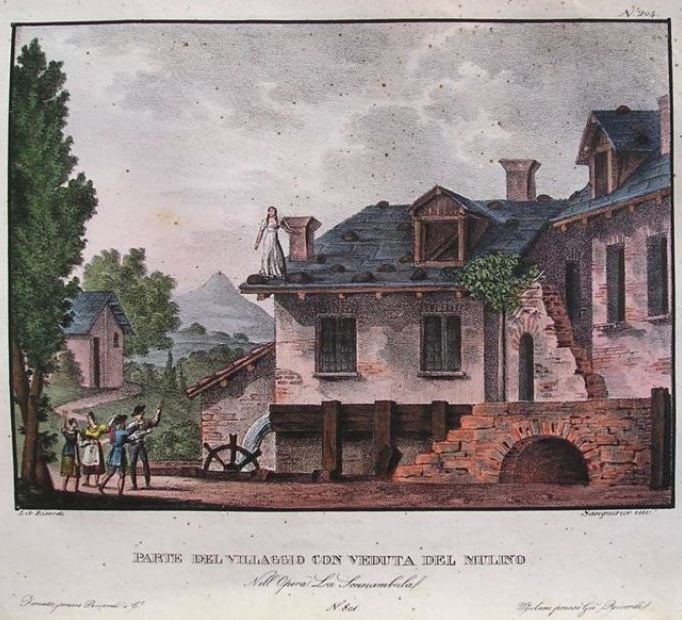
Alessandro Sanquirico's set design for the act. 2 scene 2 sleepwalking scene for the premiere production

On their way to ask the count to attest to Amina's innocence, the villagers rest in the woods and consider how they will express their support to him: (Chorus: Qui la selva è più folta ed ombrosa / "Here the wood is thick and dark"). Amina and Teresa arrive and are on a similar mission, but Amina is despondent, although Teresa encourages her daughter to continue. They then see Elvino coming in the wood looking downcast and sad. He continues to reject Amina, even when the townspeople come in with the news that the count says that she is innocent. Elvino is not convinced and takes back the ring, though he is unable to tear her image from his heart: (Aria, then chorus: Ah! Perché non posso odiarti, infedel, com'io vorrei! / "Why cannot I despise you, faithless, as I should?")

Scene 2: The village, as in act 1

Lisa, Alessio, Elvino and the villagers are in the square. Elvino declares that he will renew his vows and proceed to marry Lisa. She is delighted. As they are about to go to the church, Rodolfo enters and tries to explain that Amina is innocent because she did not come to his room awake – she is a somnambulist, a sleepwalker: (Duet, first Elvino Signor Conte, agli occhi miei / negar fede non poss'io / "I cannot deny, my lord, what my eyes have seen"; then Rodolfo V'han certuni che dormendo / "Certain people when they sleep go about as if awake".) Elvino refuses to believe him and calls upon Lisa to leave, but at that moment Teresa begs the villagers to be quiet, because Amina has at last fallen into an exhausted sleep.

Learning of the impending marriage, Teresa confronts Lisa, who says that she has never been found alone in a man's room. Teresa produces the handkerchief Lisa had accidentally dropped in the Count's room. The Count is unwilling to say what he thinks of this, but continues to insist on Amina's virtue. Elvino demands proof and Rodolfo, seeing the sleeping Amina walking across the high, dangerously unstable mill bridge, warns that to wake her would be fatal. All watch as she relives her betrothal and her grief at Elvino's rejection, taking the withered flowers in her hand. (Aria: Amina Ah! non credea mirarti / sì presto estinto, o fiore / "I had not thought I would see you, dear flowers, perished so soon".) Then as she reaches the other side safely, the distraught Elvino calls to her and she is taken into his arms. Rodolfo hands him the ring which he places on her finger, at which time she awakens and is amazed by what has happened. All rejoice. In an aria finale, Amina expresses her joy: Ah! non giunge uman pensiero / al contento ond'io son piena / "Human thought cannot conceive of the happiness that fills me".

== Recordings ==
"Ah! non credea mirarti"
Act 2, sc. 2, sung by Adelina Patti in 1906

"Ah! non credea mirarti"
Act 2, sc. 2, sung by Anna Case in 1915

"Ah! non credea mirarti"
Act 2, sc. 2, sung by Francisca Pomar de Maristany in 1929

=== Audio ===
Year	Cast (Amina, Elvino, Rodolfo, Lisa, Teresa)	Conductor Opera house and orchestra	Label
1952	Lina Pagliughi, Ferruccio Tagliavini, Cesare Siepi, Wanda Ruggeri, Anna Maria Anelli	Franco Capuana, RAI Torino Orchestra and Chorus	CD: Preiser Records; Cat: 20038
1955	Maria Callas, Cesare Valletti, Giuseppe Modesti, Eugenia Ratti, Gabriella Carturan	Leonard Bernstein, La Scala Orchestra and Chorus; Recording of a performance at La Scala on March 5	CD: Warner Classics
1957	Maria Callas, Nicola Monti, Nicola Zaccaria, Eugenia Ratti, Fiorenza Cossotto	Antonino Votto, La Scala Orchestra and Chorus, (Recorded at the Basilica di Sant'Eufemia, Milan, 3–9 March)	CD: EMI Classics; Cat: B000002RXR
1962	Joan Sutherland, Nicola Monti, Fernando Corena, Sylvia Stahlman, Margreta Elkins	Richard Bonynge, Maggio Musicale Fiorentino Orchestra and Chorus	CD: Decca; Cat: 448 966-2; 455 823-2 (France)
1980	Joan Sutherland, Luciano Pavarotti, Nicolai Ghiaurov, Isobel Buchanan, Della Jones	Richard Bonynge, National Philharmonic Orchestra; London Opera Chorus	CD: Decca; Cat: 417 424-2
1987	Jana Valášková, Josef Kundlák, Peter Mikuláš, Eva Antolicová, Ján Gallo	Ondrej Lenárd, Slovak Radio Symphony Orchestra; Slovak Philharmonic Chorus	CD: Opus; Cat: 9356 1928/29
1990	Lucia Aliberti, John Aler, Francesco Ellero d'Artegna, Jane Giering, Iris Vermillion	Jesús López Cobos, Deutschen Oper Berlin; Live recording	CD: Eurodisc; Cat: RD 69242
1992	Ľuba Orgonášová, Raúl Giménez, Francesco Ellero d'Artegna, Dilber Yunus; Alexandra Papadjiakou	Alberto Zedda, Netherlands Radio Chamber Orchestra (Recording of a concert performance in the Concertgebouw, Amsterdam)	CD: Naxos; Cat: 8.660042/43
1998	Edita Gruberová, José Bros, Roberto Scandiuzzi, Dawn Kotoski, Gloria Banditelli	Marcello Viotti, Munich Radio Orchestra	CD: Nightinggale
1999	Eva Lind, William Matteuzzi, Petteri Salomaa, Sonia Ganassi, Stefania Donzelli	Gabriele Bellini, Orchestra of Eastern Netherlands	CD: Arts
2006	Natalie Dessay, Francesco Meli, Carlo Colombara, Sara Mingardo, Jael Azzaretti	Evelino Pido, Orchestra and Chorus of the Opéra de Lyon	CD: Virgin Classics; Cat: 3 95138 2
2008	Cecilia Bartoli, Juan Diego Flórez, Ildebrando D'Arcangelo, Gemma Bertagnolli, Liliana Nikiteanu	Alessandro De Marchi, Orchestra La Scintilla	CD: L'Oiseau-Lyre (Decca); Cat: 478 1084

=== Video ===
Year	Cast (Amina, Elvino, Rodolfo, Lisa, Teresa)	Conductor, Opera house and orchestra	Label
1956	Anna Moffo, Danilo Vega, Plinio Clabassi, Gianna Galli, Anna Maria Anelli	Bruno Bartoletti; RAI Milano Orchestra and Chorus; Directed by Mario Lanfranchi (Video recording of a black and white television film)	DVD: Video Artists International; Cat: 4239
2004	Eva Mei, José Bros, Giacomo Prestia, Gemma Bertagnolli, Nicoletta Curiel	Daniel Oren; RAI Maggio Musicale Fiorentino; Directed by Federico Tiezzi (Video recording made at performances in January)	DVD: TDK DVWW; Cat: 4239
2009	Natalie Dessay, Juan Diego Flórez, Michele Pertusi, Jennifer Black, Jane Bunnell	Evelino Pidò, Metropolitan Opera Orchestra, Chorus and Ballet; Directed by Mary Zimmerman (Video recording made at performances in March)	DVD: Decca; Cat: B002Y5FKUE; HD video: Met Opera on Demand
2013	Jessica Pratt, Shalva Mukeria, Giovanni Battista Parodi, Anna Viola, Julie Mellor	Gabriele Ferro, Orchestra e Coro del Teatro La Fenice; Directed by Bepi Morassi (Video recording made at performances in April)	DVD: Cmajor; Cat: 0814337011390
2025	Nadine Sierra, Xabier Anduaga, Alexander Vinogradov, Sydney Mancasola, Deborah Nansteel	Riccardo Frizza, Metropolitan Opera Orchestra & Chorus (Recorded live, 18 October 2025; production: Rolando Villazón)	HD video: Met Opera on Demand
