= Il turco in Italia =

Opera by Gioachino Rossini

- Opera buffa by Gioachino Rossini
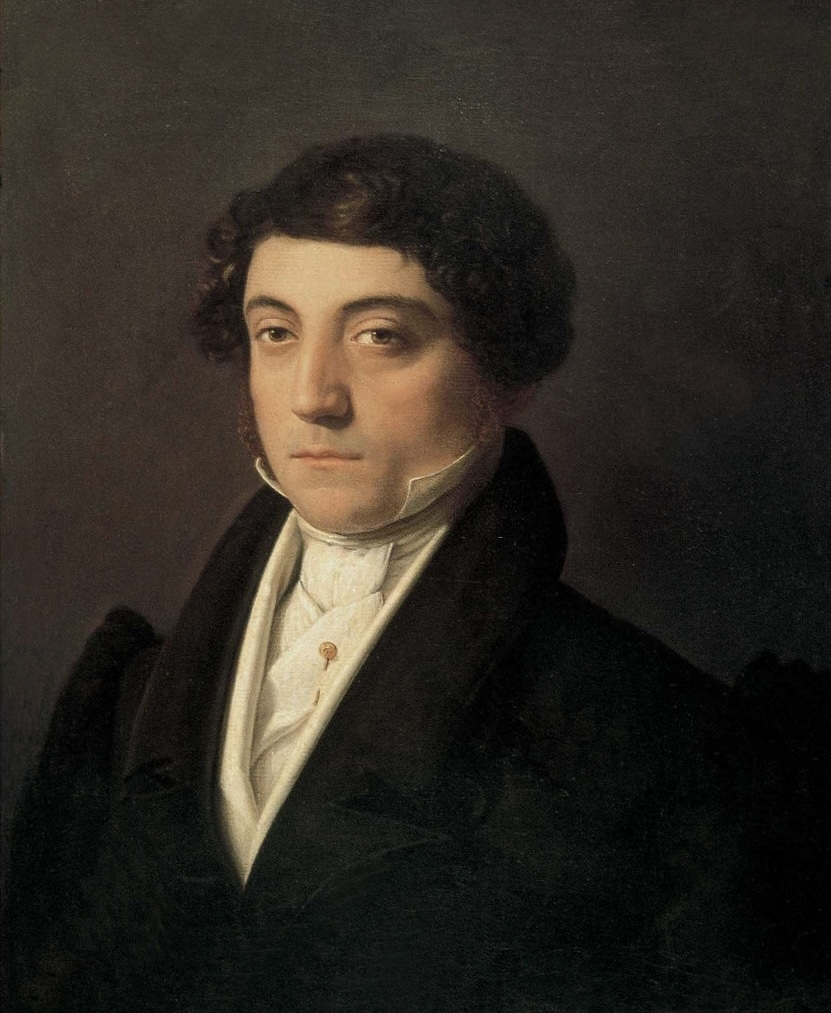
- Portrait of the composer
- Translation: The Turk in Italy
- Librettist: Felice Romani
- Language: Italian
- Premiere: 14 August 1814; La Scala, Milan

Il turco in Italia (English: The Turk in Italy) is an opera buffa in two acts by Gioachino Rossini. The Italian-language libretto was written by Felice Romani. It was a re-working of a libretto by Caterino Mazzolà set as an opera (with the same title) by the German composer Franz Seydelmann in 1788.

An opera buffa, it was influenced by Mozart's Così fan tutte, which was performed at the same theatre shortly before Rossini's work. The strangely harmonized overture, though infrequently recorded, is one of the best examples of Rossini's characteristic style. An unusually long introduction displays an extended, melancholy horn solo with full orchestral accompaniment, before giving way to a lively, purely comic main theme.

== Performance history ==
Il turco in Italia was first performed in La Scala, Milan, on 14 August 1814. It was given in London at His Majesty's Theatre on 19 May 1822 with Giuseppe de Begnis and Giuseppina de Begnis. It was first staged in New York City at the Park Theatre on 14 March 1826 with Maria Malibran, Manuel García Senior, Manuel García Junior, Barbieri, Crivelli, Rosich and Agrisani. In 1950 it was revived in Rome at the Teatro Eliseo with Maria Callas. In 1955 Callas again starred as Fiorilla, this time at the Teatro alla Scala where the opera was produced by Franco Zeffirelli. In later years Fiorilla has been sung by Cecilia Bartoli.

== Roles ==
Role	Voice type	Premiere Cast, August 14, 1814 (Conductor: Alessandro Rolla)
Don Geronio, a Neapolitan gentleman	bass	Luigi Pacini
Fiorilla, his wife	soprano	Francesca Maffei Festa
Selim, the Turk	bass	Filippo Galli
Narciso, in love with Fiorilla	tenor	Giovanni David
Prosdocimo, a poet	baritone	Pietro Vasoli
Zaida, a Turk	mezzo-soprano	Adelaide Carpano
Albazar, a Turk	tenor	Gaetano Pozzi
Gypsies, Turks, people - Chorus

== Synopsis ==
Time: 18th Century
Place: In and around Naples

=== Act 1 ===
By the sea shore near Naples

The poet Prosdocimo (baritone) is searching for a plot for a drama buffo. He meets a band of Gypsies, including the beautiful but unhappy Zaida (mezzo-soprano) and her confidant Albazar (tenor). Perhaps the Gypsies can provide some ideas? Prosdocimo's friend, the obstinate and sometimes foolish Geronio (bass), is looking for a fortune teller to advise him on his marital problems, but the Gypsies tease him. Zaida tells Prosdocimo that she is from a Turkish harem. She and her master, Prince Selim, were in love, but jealous rivals accused her of infidelity and she had to flee for her life, accompanied by Albazar. Nevertheless, she still loves only one man and that man is Selim. Prosdocimo knows that a Turkish prince will shortly be arriving in Italy. Perhaps he can help? Geronio's capricious young wife Fiorilla (soprano) enters singing (in contrast to Zaida) of the joys of free and unfettered love. A Turkish ship arrives and the prince disembarks. It is Selim (bass) himself. Fiorilla is immediately attracted to the handsome Turk, and a romance rapidly develops. Narciso (tenor) appears in her pursuit. He is an ineffectual admirer of Fiorilla posing as a friend of her husband. Geronio follows, horrified to learn that Fiorilla is taking the Turk home to drink his coffee!

Geronio's house

Fiorilla and Selim are flirting. Geronio enters timidly and Selim is initially impressed by his unexpected meekness, however Narciso noisily scolds Geronio. The domestic menage irritates Selim and he leaves after quietly arranging to meet Fiorilla again by his ship. Geronio tells Fiorilla he will not allow any more Turks - or Italians - in his house. She sweetly undermines his complaints, and then, when he softens, threatens to punish him by enjoying herself even more wildly.

The sea shore at night

Selim is waiting for Fiorilla. Instead he meets Zaida. The former lovers are shocked and delighted, and declare once more their mutual love. Narciso re-appears, followed by Fiorilla in disguise, with Geronio in pursuit. Selim confuses the veiled Fiorilla with Zaida and the two women come suddenly face to face. Fiorilla accuses Selim of betrayal. Zaida confronts Fiorilla. Geronio tells his wife to go home. There is a stormy finale.

=== Act 2 ===
At an inn

Selim approaches Geronio amicably, offering to buy Fiorilla. That way Geronio can be rid of his problems and also make some money. Geronio refuses. Selim vows to steal her instead. After they leave, Fiorilla and a group of her friends appear, followed by Zaida. Fiorilla has set up a meeting between them and Selim, so that the Turk will be forced to decide between the two women. In the event he is indecisive, not wishing to lose either of them. Zaida leaves in disgust. Selim and Fiorilla quarrel but are eventually reconciled. As the poet tells Geronio, there is going to be a party. Fiorilla will be there to meet Selim, who will be masked. Geronio should also go - disguised as a Turk! Narciso overhears this, and decides to take advantage of the situation to take Fiorilla himself, in revenge for her former indifference. Geronio laments his destiny, that he should have such a terrible, crazy wife. Albazar passes by holding a costume - for Zaida!

A ballroom with masqueraders and dancers

Fiorilla mistakes Narciso for Selim and Narciso leads her away. Meanwhile, Selim enters with Zaida, under the impression that she is Fiorilla. Geronio is in utter despair at finding two couples and two Fiorillas! Narciso and Selim both entreat their partners to leave with them. Confused and angry, Geronio attempts to stop both couples, but they eventually escape.

Back at the inn

Prosdocimo meets Geronio. They now know that Selim was with Zaida and guess that Fiorilla was with Narciso. Albazar confirms that Selim will definitely stay with Zaida. Prosdocimo advises Geronio to have his revenge on Fiorilla by pretending to divorce her and threatening to send her back to her family.

Having discovered Narciso's deception, Fiorilla tries to find Selim, but he has already left with Zaida. She returns home only to find the divorce letter, and her belongings being removed from the house. She is devastated by shame, and promptly deserted by her friends.

The beach

Selim and Zaida are about to set sail for Turkey, while Fiorilla is looking for a boat to take her back to her home town. Geronio finds and forgives her. They are affectionately reconciled. Both couples are now reunited and Prosdocimo is delighted with his happy ending.

== Recordings ==
Year	Cast: Don Geronio, Donna Fiorilla, Selim, Don Narciso, Zaida, Prosdocimo, Albazar	Conductor, Opera House and Orchestra	Label
1954	Franco Calabrese, Maria Callas, Nicola Rossi-Lemeni, Nicolai Gedda, Jolanda Gardino, Mariano Stabile, Piero de Palma	Gianandrea Gavazzeni, Chorus and Orchestra of the Teatro alla Scala, Milan	Audio CD: EMI Classics; Cat: CD 58662
1958	Franco Calabrese, Graziella Sciutti, Sesto Bruscantini, Agostino Lazzari, Renata Mattioli, Scipio Colombo	Nino Sanzogno, RAI Symphony Orchestra and Chorus, Milan	Audio CD: Pantheon/Myto/Urania/Opera d'Oro; Cat: CD 6653
1978	James Billings, Beverly Sills, Donald Gramm, Henry Price, Susanne Marsee	Julius Rudel, New York City Opera Orchestra and Chorus (Video recording of a performance in an English translation by Andrew Porter at the New York City Opera, stage directed by Tito Capobianco, 4 October)	DVD: Premiere Opera Ltd. DVD 5148
1981	Enzo Dara, Montserrat Caballé, Samuel Ramey, Ernesto Palacio, Jane Berbié, Leo Nucci, Paolo Barbacini	Riccardo Chailly, National Philharmonic Orchestra and the Ambrosian Opera Chorus	Audio CD: CBS “Masterworks”/Sony Music Distribution; Cat: CD 37859
1991	Enrico Fissore, Sumi Jo, Simone Alaimo, Raúl Giménez, Susanne Mentzer, Alessandro Corbelli, Peter Bronder	Neville Marriner, Academy of St Martin in the Fields and the Ambrosian Opera Chorus	Audio CD: Philips; Cat:000943202
1998	Michele Pertusi, Cecilia Bartoli, Alessandro Corbelli, Ramón Vargas, Laura Polverelli, Roberto de Candia, Francesco Piccoli	Riccardo Chailly, Theatre Chorus and Orchestra of La Scala	Audio CD:Decca/London; Cat: 458924
2000	Paolo Rumetz, Paoletta Marrocu, Antonio de Gobbi, Davide Cicchetti, Laura Brioli	Alessandro Pinzauti, Citta Lirica Orchestra and Chorus	Audio CD: Kicco Classic; Cat: 53
2002	Paolo Rumetz, Cecilia Bartoli, Ruggero Raimondi, Reinaldo Macias, Judith Schmid	Franz Welser-Möst, Orchestra and Chorus of the Zürich Opera (Video recording of a performance at the Zürich Opera, April or May 2002)	DVD: ArtHaus Musik; Cat: 100.369
2005	Piero Guarnera, Myrtò Papatanasiu, Natale de Carolis, Daniele Zanfardino, Damiana Pinti, Massimiliano Gagliardo, Amadeo Moretti	Marzio Conti, Orchestra and Chorus of the Theatre Maruccino, Chieti	Audio CD: Naxos Records; Cat: 8660183-84
2008	Andrea Concetti, Alessandra Marianelli, Marco Vinco, Filippo Adami, Elena Belfiore, Bruno Taddia, Daniele Zanfardino	Antonello Allemandi, Haydn Orchestra of Bolzano and Trento	Audio CD: Dynamic; Cat: 5661-2
