= Giuseppe Balducci (composer) =

Italian composer

- Born: Giuseppe Antonio Luigi Angelo Balducci; 2 May 1796; Iesi, Italy
- Died: 1845; Málaga, Spain
- Occupation: Composer

Giuseppe Balducci (2 May 1796 – 1845) was an Italian composer, primarily of operas. Born in Iesi, he spent most of his career in Naples and was one of the originators of the "salon opera" genre, the forerunner of chamber opera.

== Life and career ==
Balducci was born in Iesi to a once-prosperous family in the city. He was a distant cousin of the composer Giovanni Battista Pergolesi (their grandfathers were brothers). Balducci's father, a successful businessman, was kidnapped and killed on one of his travels shortly before Balducci was born. A business partner fraudulently took possession of most of his father's wealth leaving Balducci's mother and children in very straitened circumstances. Balducci studied music under the castrato singer Giovanni Ripa in Iesi and the composer Pietro Morandi in nearby Senigallia.

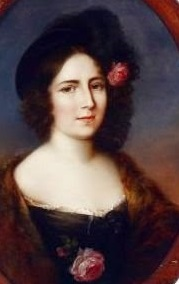
Matilde Capece Minutolo, the wife of Raimondo and mother of Paolina, Adelaide, and Clotilde for whom Balducci wrote his chamber operas

By the age of 17, Balducci had formed his own opera troupe, in which he also sang as the lead tenor. However, a year later, he was forced to flee his native city after killing the nephew of the Papal Governor in a duel. On his arrival in Naples, he found employment as the music master to the three young daughters of Raimondo Capece Minutolo (1769–1827), a retired field marshal, and a member of an ancient Neapolitan noble family. Balducci would remain a member of the Capece Minutolo household for the rest of his life.

Once he was settled in Naples, Balducci resumed his own music studies, this time with the composer Niccolò Zingarelli at the Collegio San Sebastiano. He made his debut as an opera composer with Il sospetto funesto, an opera semiseria which was produced at the Teatro del Fondo in March 1820. The critic for the Giornale del Regno delle Due Sicilie excoriated the hackneyed libretto based on a play which had been circulating throughout Italy, but reserved praise for Balducci's music. Four more operas followed, the last of which Tazia was performed at the Teatro San Carlo in 1826 with Caroline Ungher in the title role. According to Balducci's biographer Jeremy Commons, the performance was "sabotaged by a disaffected orchestra for unknown reasons", and Balducci retired from composing for the public theatre for the next twelve years.

After the death of Raimondo Capece Minutolo in 1827, his widow Matilde (daughter of the former Viceroy of Mexico Bernardo de Galvez) named Balducci the guardian or tutore of her daughters Paolina, Adelaide, and Clotilde. (Note: In the 19th century, a male guardian was customary in Italy for all minors whose fathers had died, although the mother normally had the right to choose the guardian if one had not been specified in the father's will.) He devoted much of his time to helping her in the administration of the family's finances and the education of the three sisters. Between 1827 and 1839, Balducci composed five "salon operas" (forerunners of the modern chamber opera) which were performed by Paolina, Adelaide, and Clotilde and their friends in the family's house. Unusually for Italian operas of the day, these works were composed solely for women's voices. With the exception of his penultimate opera for the family, Scherzo, the musical accompaniment was scored for only two pianos.

In 1838, Balducci returned to the public theatre for a final time with his opera Bianca Turenga, which was performed at the Teatro San Carlo. Arias from the work were later published in Milan by Casa Ricordi. The following year, Matilde Capece Minutolo died suddenly in Spain while attending to her properties there. (Note: Matilde de Gálvez Capece Minutolo was a member of a noble Spanish family which had holdings in Andalusia and in the New World. Her father, Bernardo de Gálvez, was the Viceroy of Mexico from 1785 to 1786.) After her death, Balducci's responsibilities in the household increased dramatically, and he virtually ceased composing. He died in Málaga, Spain in 1845, while carrying out business affairs for the Capece Minutolo family.

In 1882, Clotilde Capece Minutolo, the last surviving sister, donated her family's extensive music collection to the San Pietro a Majella conservatory in Naples. It includes the autograph scores of many of Balducci's works as well as Clotilde's diary, which is the source for much of the information about Balducci's early life and the circumstances of his flight from Iesi. Although Balducci's works were largely forgotten after his death, all of his chamber operas have since been revived beginning in the early 1990s. Opera Waikato in New Zealand has staged I gelosi (1993), Il noce di Benevento (1995) and Scherzo (1996). Scherzo was staged again in 2014 during the Festival dell'Opera da Camera in Jesi, its first public performance in Italy. The Rossini in Wildbad festival has staged I gelosi (2006), Boabdil, re di Granata (2007), Il noce di Benevento (2011), and Il conte di Marsico (2016).

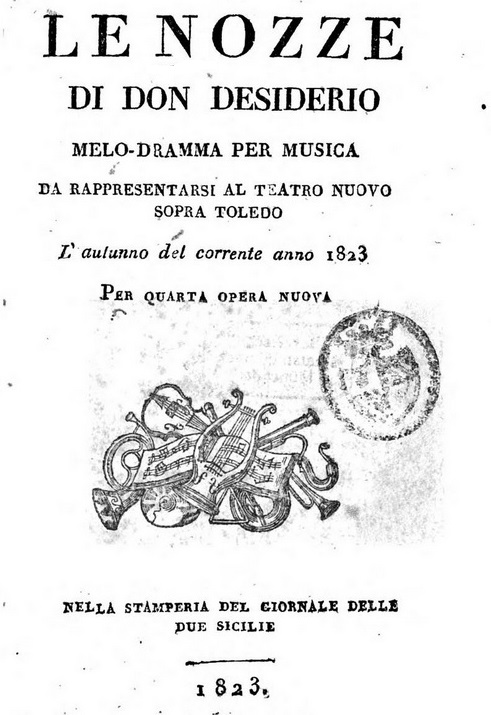
Libretto for Balducci's 1823 opera Le nozze di Don Desiderio

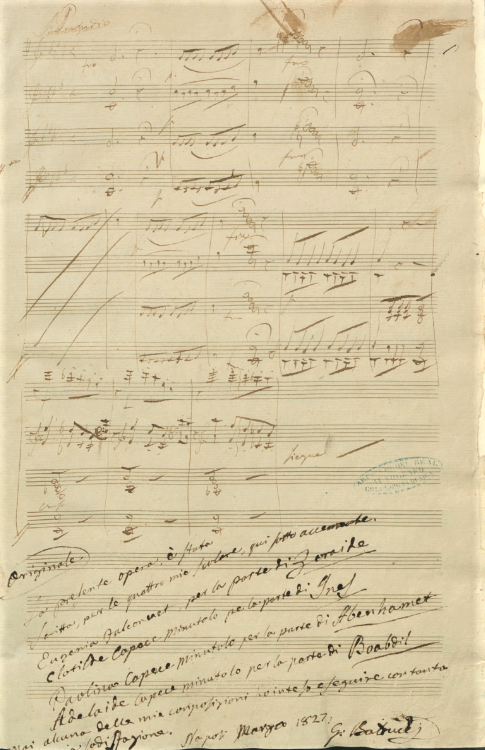
Balducci's autograph score for Boabdil, re di Granata (page 1)

== Works ==
Although he was primarily known for his operas in his own lifetime, Balducci composed several pieces of religious vocal music including two masses and a Salve regina. He also composed various songs and duets; an oratorio, Adamo; a cantata for two voices, Andromaca; and additional music for Stephen Storace's opera The Pirates when it was revived under the title Isidore de Merida in 1827.

Operas composed for public performance

- Il sospetto funesto, opera semiseria in two acts (librettistas Pietro Celestino Giannone and Andrea Leone Tottola), premiered Teatro del Fondo, Naples, March 1820
- L'amante virtuoso, dramma giocoso in two acts (libretto by Giovanni Schmidt), premiered Teatro del Fondo, Naples, 1 April 1823
- Le nozze di Don Desiderio, melodramma per musica in two acts (librettist unknown, listed only in the printed libretto as "Signor N. N."), premiered Teatro Nuovo, Naples, 8 November 1823
- Riccardo l'intrepido, melodramma per musica in two acts (libretto by Jacopo Ferretti), premiered Teatro Valle, Rome, 9 September 1824
- Tazia, dramma in one act (libretto by Luigi Ricciuti), premiered Teatro San Carlo, Naples, 15 January 1826
- Bianca Turenga, melodramma in three acts (libretto by Giovanni Emanuele Bidera), premiered Teatro San Carlo, Naples, 11 August 1838

Chamber operas composed for the Capece Minutolo household

All of these chamber operas were scored for female voices and two pianos played by four or six hands. However Scherzo, performed to celebrate the name day of Matilde Capece Minutolo, also has a finale which employs a small orchestra and male chorus. The score of Il conte di Marsico, the last and most ambitious of these works was published by Ricordi in 1840.

- Boabdil, re di Granata, opera seria in two acts (librettist unknown), first performed Naples, March 1827
- I gelosi, commedia per musica in two acts (libretto by Giulio Tarantino), first performed Naples, April 1834
- Il noce di Benevento, opera buffa in two acts (librettist unknown), first performed Naples, Winter 1836
- Scherzo, opera comica in one act (libretto by Giuseppe Campagna), first performed Naples, 14 March 1837
- Il conte di Marsico, melodramma in a prologue and two acts (libretto by Anacleto Balducci and Vincenzo Salvagnoli), first performed Naples, 26 February 1839

== Recordings ==
Introducing Giuseppe Balducci, a sampling of Balducci's work, which includes excerpts from his chamber operas Scherzo, I gelosi and Il Conte di Marsico, was released on LP in 1986 by the New Zealand Opera Society and re-issued on CD in 2000. An excerpt from Balducci's opera Tazia appears on the CD A Hundred Years of Italian Opera 1820–1830, released by Opera Rara in 1994.
