= Fausta (opera) =

1832 opera by Gaetano Donizetti

- Opera by Gaetano Donizetti
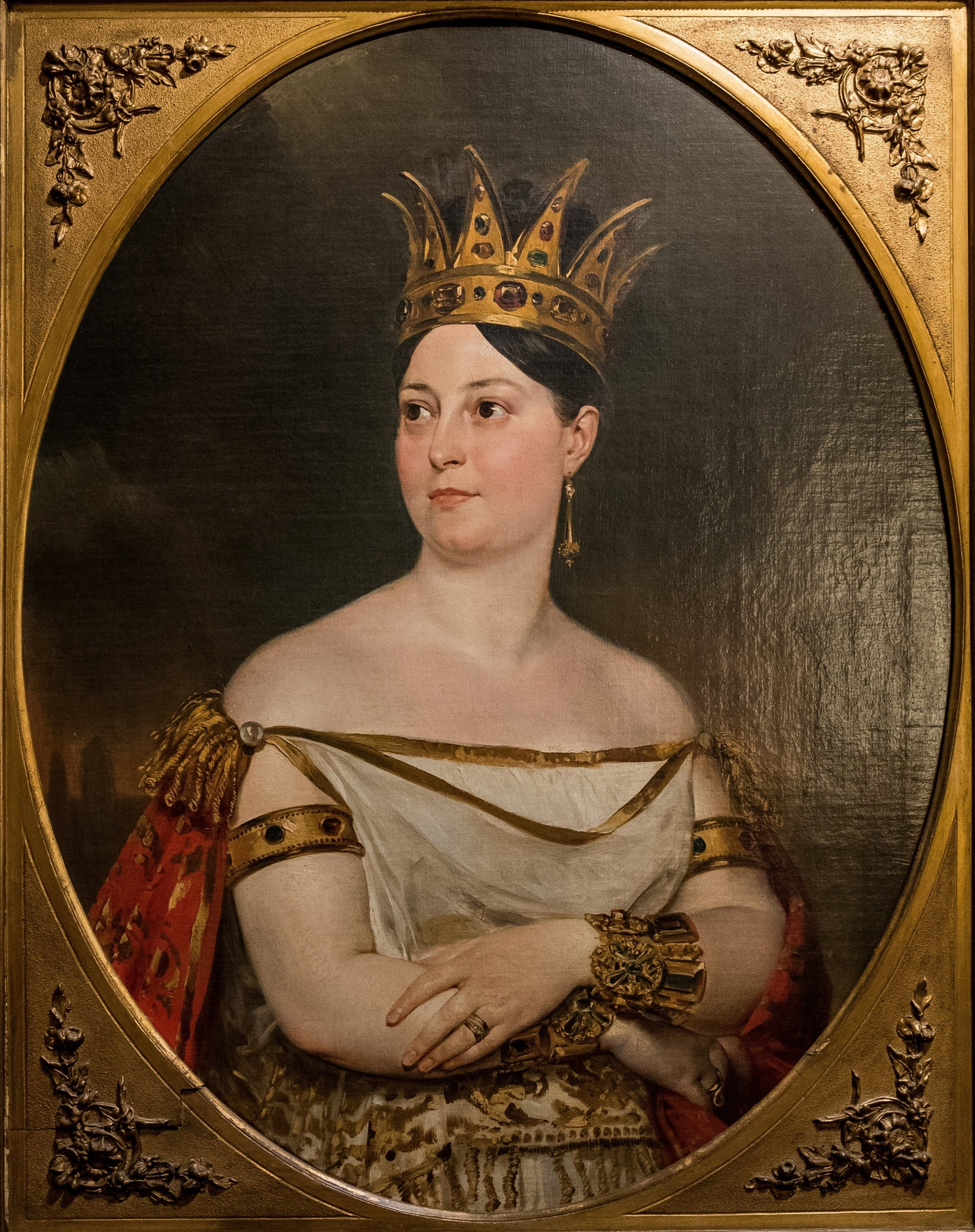
- Giuseppina Ronzi de Begnis, for whom the title was written, by Karl Briullov
- Librettist: Domenico Gilardoni
- Language: Italian
- Based on: Tommaso Sgricci's Crispo
- Premiere: 12 January 1832; Teatro San Carlo, Naples

Fausta is a melodramma, or opera seria, in two acts by Gaetano Donizetti. The Italian libretto was partly written by Domenico Gilardoni, who died while doing so: the remainder was written by Donizetti. The literary source of the opera's libretto is Crispo, a tragedy improvised by Tommaso Sgricci on 3 November 1827.

The opera successfully debuted on 12 January 1832 at the Teatro di San Carlo in Naples, and was written with prima donna Giuseppina Ronzi de Begnis in mind; she was rumored to be the king's mistress.

Although the libretto had irked the chief censor, the production went ahead, supposedly because of Ronzi de Begnis' influence in high places. Donizetti wrote this opera for the birthday of King Ferdinand II of the Two Sicilies. Walter Scott was present at the premiere and it has been suggested that the King introduced him to the composer; Scott thought that Fausta was “without any remarkable music.” The opera marked the beginning of an important and fruitful collaboration with Ronzi de Begnis. Only 18 days separate the premiere of Bellini's Norma at La Scala and Donizetti's new opera – both set in ancient Rome and her Empire. Donizetti's aim was not to compete with Bellini's opera but simply to expand on the success of his Anna Bolena of 1830.

The opera, based on historical events, involves the complications that ensue when Fausta, the wife of Emperor Constantine I falls in love with her stepson. Historical accuracy leaves something to be desired; in fact Maximian (Massimiano) had died much before the incestuous scandal involving Fausta and Crispus (Crispo) exploded.

== Performance history ==
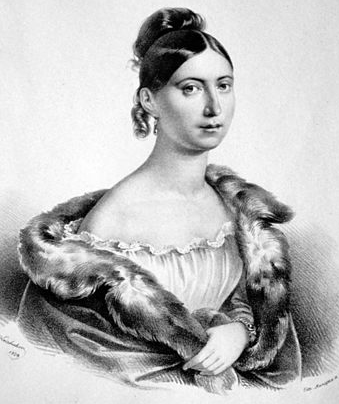
Giuditta Pasta, by Kriehuber

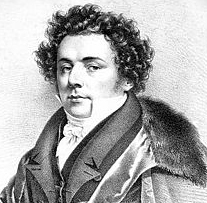
Luigi Lablache

When the opera was performed at the Teatro del Fondo on 30 August and 2 September 1832, Donizetti added a duet for Luigi Lablache who had replaced Tamburini in the role of Costantino. Donizetti was not pleased with his interpretation; however, this was one of the very rare instances in which the composer made a negative remark about the famous bass.

Fausta was performed for the first time at La Scala, Milan, on 26 December 1832, as the prestigious season's premiere; the public fell in love with it and this resulted in a total of 31 performances. For this occasion Donizetti added an overture, and a cavatina "Par che mi dica ancor" for the soprano Adelaide Tosi. The composer borrowed this aria di sortita (entrance aria) from his earlier Il castello di Kenilworth and changed the words in "Ah, se d'amor potessi". Furthermore, an aria for the tenor "Se crudel cosi m'estimi" was added without Donizetti's consent.

Nevertheless the lyrics were later recycled by Donizetti for a tenor aria added to the January 1834 production at the Teatro Regio di Torino. In 1833, Fausta was performed at La Fenice in Venice, with Giuditta Pasta as Fausta and Domenico Donzelli as Crispo receiving mixed reviews. For this occasion Donizetti added a new scene at the beginning with a new aria for Fausta and, in act 2, a new duet "Per te rinunzio al soglio" for Fausta and Crispo. This duet was later utilized for Buondelmonte and ultimately in Maria Stuarda for the Milanese premiere of this opera as a duet for Maria and Leicester, "Ben io comprendi"; later, in 1865 for a Naples production the words were changed to those used ever since: "Da tutti abbandonata". Additionally, for the Venice production Donizetti wrote a duet (act 2) for Costantino and Crispo, "T'amo ancora" replacing the baritone's aria "Se di regnar desio"; and finally, a tenor's aria (also in act 2) "Ah! perche dirmi crudel".

In 1841, for a La Scala production, Donizetti added a duet for tenor and baritone, "E che mi valse...", borrowing from earlier operas Pia de Tolomei and Il diluvio universale. Other important premieres include Madrid in 1833, Lisbon and Barcelona in 1834; Palermo, Genoa and Bologna also in 1834; Berlin in 1835; Havana in 1837; Vienna in 1841; London in 1841 (described as a "failure"); and Rio de Janeiro in 1850.

The opera received its first performance in modern times when it was revived at the Rome Opera in 1981 with Raina Kabaivanska in the title role.

== Roles ==
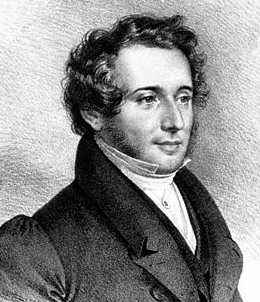
Antonio Tamburini

Roles, voice types, premiere cast
Role	Voice type	Premiere cast, 12 January 1832
Constantino il Grande, emperor of Rome	baritone	Antonio Tamburini
Fausta, his second wife	soprano	Giuseppina Ronzi de Begnis
Beroe, a prisoner, Crispo's beloved	mezzo-soprano	Virginia Eden
Crispo, son of Constantino and Minervina	tenor	Giovanni Basadonna
Massimiano, Fausta's father	bass	Giovanni Campagnoli
Licinia, Fausta's confidant	contralto	Edvige Ricci
Albino, jailer	tenor	Giovanni Revalden
Kinsmen and confidantes of the emperor, senators, soldiers, people

== Synopsis ==
Time: 326 A.D.
Place: Rome

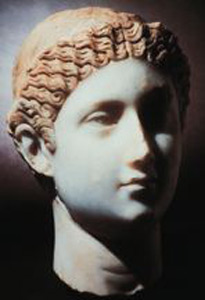
Empress Fausta: marble bust from Turkey, 325 CE; Spurlock Museum

=== Act 1 ===
Scene 1: The Capitol Square, with the Temple of Jupiter in the background

The populace welcomes the return of victorious Crispo, son of Emperor Constantine and his first wife Minervina. A high priest by the altar is waiting to crown Crispo who has been successful in his campaign against the Gauls. Fausta, the second wife of Constantine, and her father Massimiano (archrival of the Emperor), as well as Licinia, Constantine himself and scores of prisoners witness the triumph of Crispo. Fausta looks at him and feels the pangs of her incestuous love; Constantine rejoices and Beroe, one the prisoners, remembers her love at first sight for Crispo. Constantine notices her and wonders about the female prisoner; Crispo explains that she is the daughter of a prince and declares his love for her. Fausta is stunned by the development and the Emperor tells Beroe to come forward; she declares her love and Constantine tells her that he is going to marry them that very day. Fausta is devastated by the announcement and tells her husband that the wedding will have to be set for the following day because the goddess Vesta so requires. Licinia and those attending the event rejoice. After the jubilation, everyone leaves except Massimiano who is conspiring against the Emperor, and although he failed his first attempt to kill both father and son, this time he is sure he will succeed.

Scene 2: The magnificent imperial apartments

The Empress's maids wonder why she no longer smiles. Fausta, in deep thought, is depressed and asks the servants and Licinia to leave. Alone, Fausta is perturbed by her unrequited love for Crispo and she feels that her only rewards are tears and endless despair.

Scenes 3, 4, 5, and 6: The pavilion

Licinia accompanies Crispo to the pavilion where Fausta is planning to meet him. After arriving, she ensures that no one is in sight and tells her stepson that she has to unveil a secret that has caused her great distress. It is no state secret, but her love for someone.

Unexpected, Beroe arrives much to the delight of her lover, Fausta shudders, and explains to the Empress that Massimiano needs to see her. Fausta tells her rival to leave. When they are alone again she implores Crispus to forget Beroe and to direct his love to someone who is really passionately devoted to him. He begins to understand what she means by a secret and is horrified by her revelation; he tries to leave, but she grabs his hand and tells him that if he rejects her, Beroe will perish. He falls on his knees and begs her not to do that.

Constantine, Beroe, Massimiano, members of the imperial household, Licinia and the maids arrive. The Emperor is suspicious seeing the son prostrated before his wife. When she explains that he was professing his love for her, all are aghast and even Beroe believes he is guilty. The Empress whispers to Crispo that she is willing to recant and die if he loves her. Massimiano is overjoyed because the turn of events is very favourable to his plans to topple Constantine who is determined to exile the son. Crispo, in turn, blames Fausta for the curse the father has cast on him; she begins to see the early signs of the great tragedy she has unleashed.

=== Act 2 ===
Scenes 1, 2, 3 and 4: A grove close to the imperial palace

It is night. Maximinian, who dreams to become Emperor before sunrise, has summoned his followers to murder both Crispo and Constantine.

While Maximinian and his men prepare to leave, Crispo and Beroe arrive. The former captive princess explains that Licinia has confessed to Fausta's machinations. Massimiano suspects there are other people in the grove and, when he bumps into Crispo, both become very suspicious of each other and brandish their swords.

Holding torches, Massimiano's followers, along with Constantine, appear. Seeing him with his greatest enemy, the Emperor declares that his son is plotting to get rid of him. Crispo kneels at his feet saying that he is ready to die. He professes his innocence on all accusations. The father responds that the judges and the Senate will decide his fate. Crispo is arrested and carried away by the pretorians.

At dawn, Beroe and Licinia talk about the impending trial that will sentence Crispo to death.

Scenes 5 and 6: The Senate Hall

The senators have gathered and the Emperor arrives escorted by his guards. Constantine realizes he still has deep feelings for his son and warns Massimiano to give a factual deposition. However, during his narration he alleges that Crispo was planning to kill the Emperor. Crispo responds that this is a lie and asks Beroe to tell the facts. She explains that Crispo is innocent and that she is ready to be exiled with him, the truth being that Massimiano and his assassins were ready to kill both father and son. Crispo confirms this explanation, but the father tells the senators to remember what had just been said. Constantine wants to speak to Crispo and all are asked to leave, but although he professes love for the son, when he sees no tears coming from the eyes of Crispo he remains convinced that the son is guilty. Crispo responds that an innocent person has no tears. The senators are summoned back to the hall and deliver a guilty verdict. Constantine realizes that he is about to send his son to the executioner and, trembling, he signs the death warrant.

Scenes 7, 8, 9, 10 and 11: The atrium of the jail

Jailer Albino feels very sorry for the 20-year-old Crispo. Fausta enters and asks him to bring her stepson; she realizes that this is her last chance. Crispo cannot believe his eyes and ears as she professes love for him in a desperate delirium. Fausta tells him that they can run away, but he shows her the poison inside his ring. She snatches the ring and utters "Love will save you."

Massimiano and four armed guards arrive. Fausta is ordered to leave, but she resists and begs the father not to execute Crispo. One of the guards returns from Crispo's cell and confirms that the execution has been carried out. Fausta ingests the poison from the ring and collapses, Massimiano rushes to the cell and hears voices calling for his own death.

Constantine has heard the truth from Massimiano's hitmen and arrives with Beroe, Licinia, the Empress's maids and his pretorians. In his hand is the signed pardon for his son, but Massimiano proudly and cynically confirms that his son is dead. Meanwhile Fausta has regained some of her strength and tells Constantine about her lies. When the infuriated Emperor remonstrates that she will pay the ultimate price, she confesses that she has taken a deadly poison. Everyone is horrified and in unison respond, "Evil woman; there is no bigger monster than you on earth."

== Recordings ==
Year	Cast (Costantino, Fausta, Crispo, Massimiano)	Conductor, Opera house and orchestra	Label
1981	Renato Bruson, Raina Kabaivanska, Giuseppe Giacomini, Luigi Roni	Daniel Oren; Teatro dell'Opera di Roma Orchestra and Chorus (Recording of a performance at Rome, November)	CD: Gala; Cat: GL 100617
