= Sancia di Castiglia =

Opera by Gaetano Donizetti

- Opera seria by Gaetano Donizetti
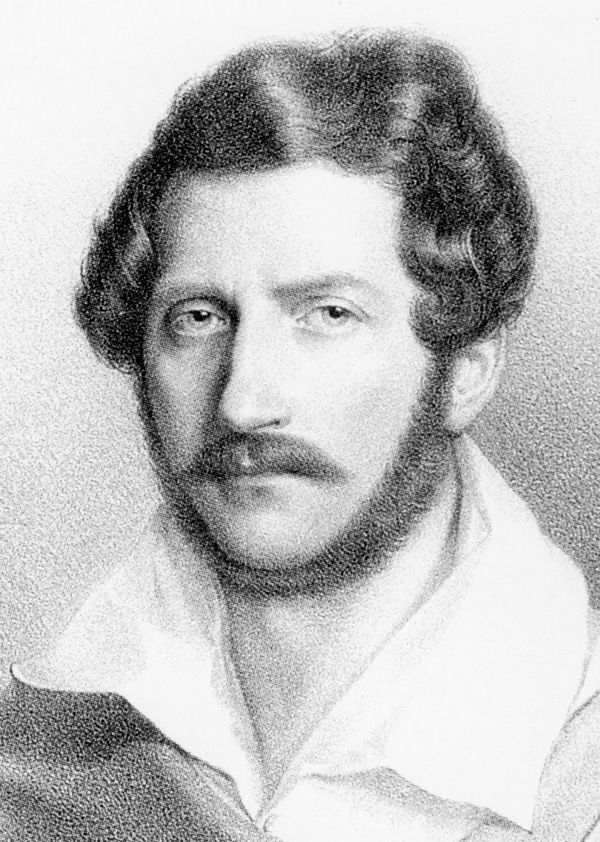
- Gaetano Donizetti c. 1835
- Librettist: Pietro Salatino
- Language: Italian
- Premiere: 4 November 1832; Teatro San Carlo, Naples

Sancia di Castiglia is an Italian opera seria in two acts by Gaetano Donizetti to a libretto by Pietro Salatino. It was first performed at the Teatro San Carlo in Naples on 4 November 1832, conducted by Nicola Festa.

== Roles ==
Roles, voice types, premiere cast
| Role | Voice type | Premiere cast, 4 November 1832 Conductor: Nicola Festa |
|---|---|---|
| Sancia | soprano | Giuseppina Ronzi de Begnis |
| Garzia, her son | mezzo-soprano | Diomilla Santolini |
| Ircano | bass | Luigi Lablache |
| Rodrigo | tenor | Giovanni Basadonna |
| Elvira | soprano | Edvige Ricci |

== Synopsis ==
Place: Castile, Spain
Time: The Middle Ages

Sancia, Queen of Castile, (Note: There were two Queens Sancha of Castile, and Sancha of León had a son García II of Galicia, but the plot is unrelated to those.) whose husband has been killed in battle, also believes that her son, Garcia, has been killed. She plans to marry the Saracen prince, Ircano, against the advice of her minister, Rodrigo. When Garcia, having survived an assassination attempt instigated by Ircano, reappears to claim the throne, Ircano tells Sancia that he will marry her only if she poisons her son. Garcia is about to drink from the poisoned goblet when a suddenly repentant Sancia snatches it and drinks it herself. She dies pleading for her son's forgiveness.

== Recordings ==
| Year | Cast: Sancia, Ircano, Rodrigo | Conductor, opera house and orchestra | Label |
|---|---|---|---|
| 1992 | Montserrat Caballé, Boris Martinovich, José Sempere | José M. Collado, Coro del Teatro Lírico Nacional. Orquesta Sinfónica de Madrid (Recording of a concert performance in the Teatro de la Zarzuela, Madrid, 9 February) | CD: House of Opera; Cat: CD 192 |
