= Teatro Rossini (Pesaro) =

Opera house in Pesaro, Italy

Coordinates: 43.9078°N 12.9087°E

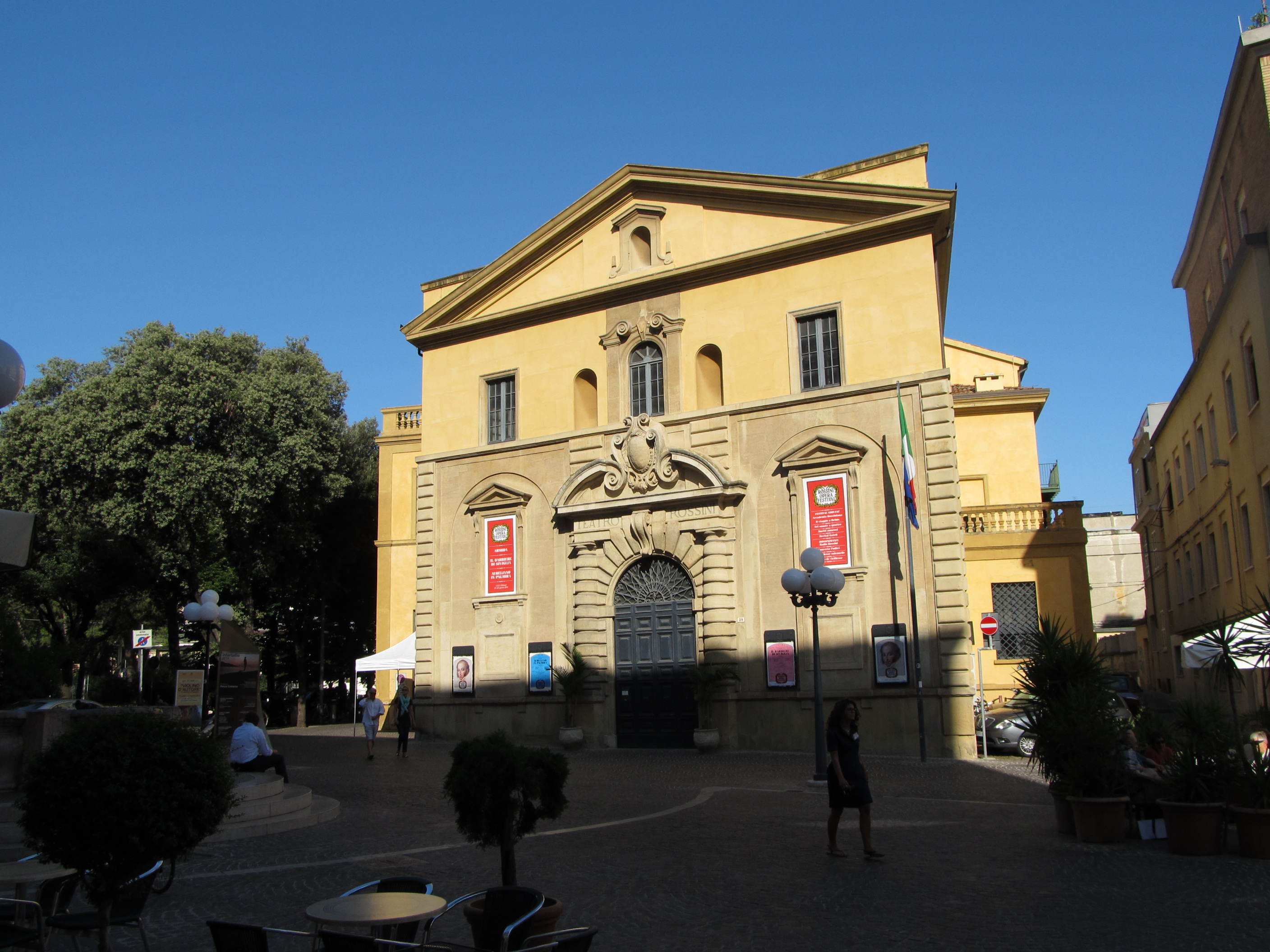
Facade of theater.

Teatro Rossini is the name of an opera house in Pesaro, Italy that serves as a venue for the Rossini Opera Festival.

Built as the Teatro Nuovo (on the site of the original 1637 Teatro del Sole), it was inaugurated on 10 June 1818 with a performance of Gioacchino Rossini's La gazza ladra conducted by the composer in the town of his birth. It seats 860, with an auditorium designed in the classic horseshoe shape with four tiers of boxes plus the gallery.

The theatre took its present name in the composer's honour in 1854.

After a 1930 earthquake it required structural renovations. It re-opened in August 1934 with a performance of Guglielmo Tell. In 1966, however, cracks in the walls and decaying woodwork led to its being declared unsafe, and it was closed for 14 years. It re-opened again on 6 April 1980, the same year as the first Rossini Opera Festival took place. Since then it has been the home of the annual festival, which is held in August. Additional renovations took place in 2002.

== See also ==
- List of opera festivals
- List of opera houses
