= Fanny Salvini-Donatelli =

Italian operatic soprano (c. 1815–1891)

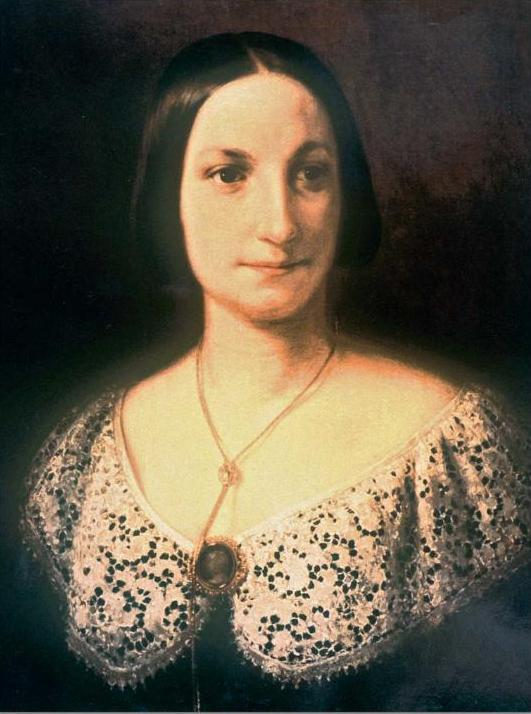
- Portrait of Fanny Salvini-Donatelli from the Teatro La Fenice archives
- Born: Francesca Lucchi c. 1815; Florence
- Died: 1891; Milan
- Occupation: Operatic soprano

Fanny Salvini-Donatelli (c. 1815 – 1891) was an Italian operatic soprano. She is best known today for creating the role of Violetta in Verdi's opera, La traviata, but she was also an admired interpreter of the composer's other works as well as those by Donizetti.

== Biography ==
Fanny Salvini-Donatelli, whose real name was Francesca Lucchi, was born in Florence to a prosperous family. Financial hardship following her father's death led her to a career as an actress. In the early 1830s, she became the second wife of the actor Giuseppe Salvini (and the stepmother of the much more famous actor Tommaso Salvini). (Note: Note that some sources, e.g. Gatti (1955), p. 133, erroneously describe her as the second wife of Tommaso Salvini.) However, her marriage was an unhappy one, as was her relationship with her stepchildren. Following her desertion of the family in 1842, Giuseppe Salvini obtained a separation on the grounds of infidelity. He died two years later. While married to Salvini, she studied singing and made her operatic debut in 1839 at the Teatro Apollo in Venice as Rosina in Il barbiere di Siviglia.

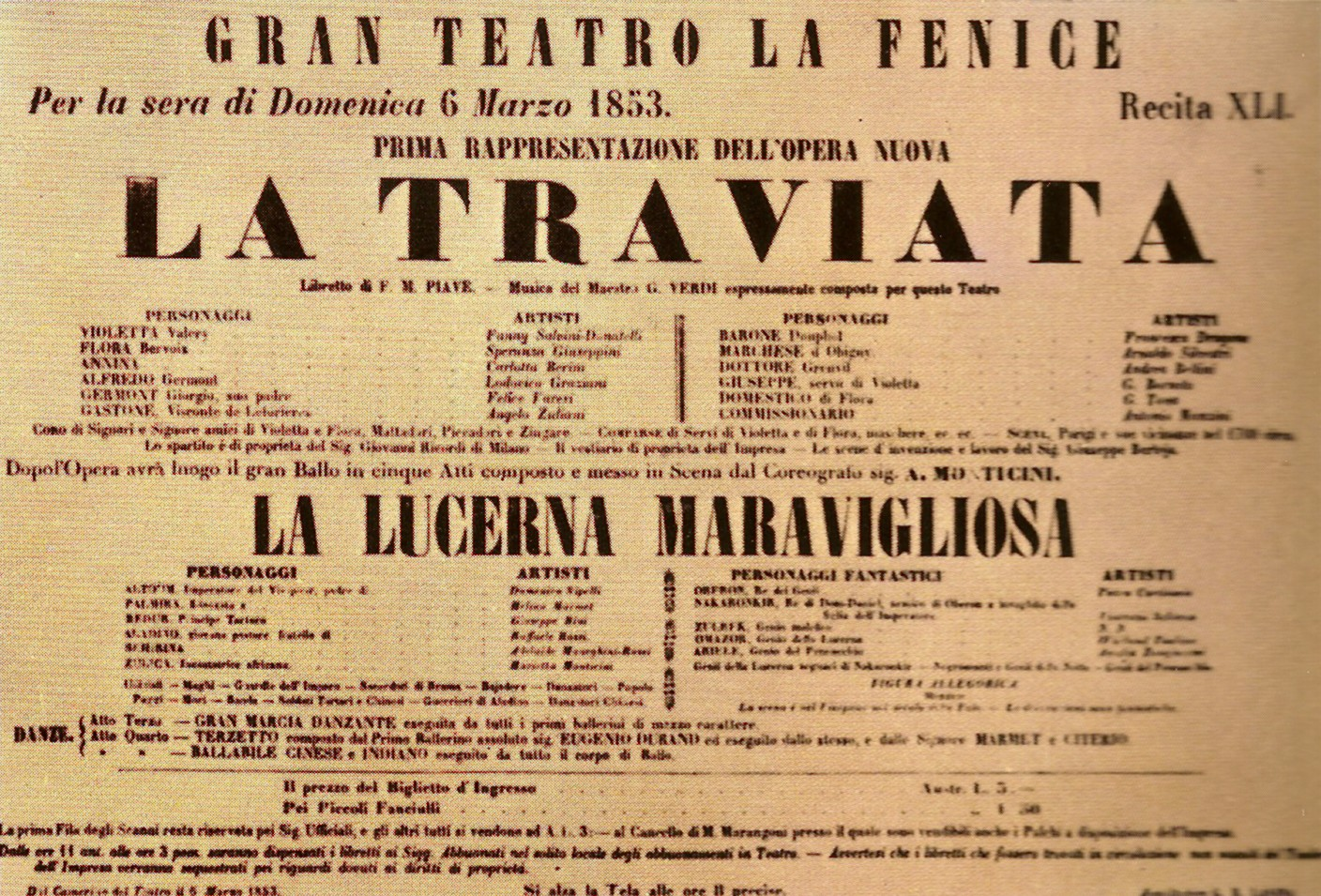
Premier poster for La traviata, Salvini-Donatelli as Violetta Valéry

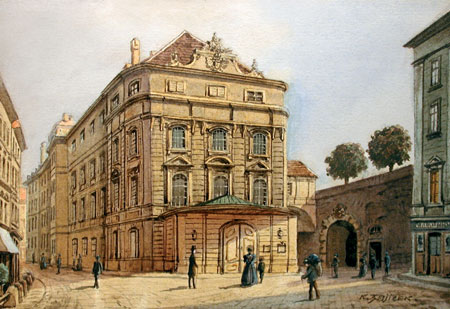
Theater am Kärntnertor where Salvini-Donatelli made her Vienna debut in 1843 as Abigaille in Verdi's Nabucco

Salvini-Donatelli went on to a major career in Italy singing primarily at La Fenice and the Teatro Regio di Parma, where in 1850 a sonnet in her honour, written by the city's epigramist, Artaserse Folli, was distributed to the audience. She also performed at La Scala, the Teatro Regio di Torino, the Teatro Comunale di Bologna, the Teatro Grande di Trieste and several other Italian theatres. Outside Italy, she sang in Paris, Barcelona, Vienna (where she made her debut in 1843 as Abigaille in Nabucco conducted by Verdi himself), and London (where she made her debut in 1858 at the Theatre Royal, Drury Lane as Leonora in Il trovatore). Although she is primarily remembered for creating the role of Violetta in La traviata, she created four other roles in now forgotten operas: Editta in Giovanni Pacini's Allan Cameron (18 March 1848, La Fenice); Elmina in Salvatore Sarmiento's Elmina (8 February 1851, Teatro Regio di Parma); Clemenza in Gualtiero Sanelli's Il fornaretto (24 March 1851, Teatro Regio di Parma); and Donna Eleonora in Carlo Ercole Bosoni's La prigioniera (16 January 1853, La Fenice).

She was generally thought to have retired from the stage in 1860. However, she is reported as singing at the Théâtre Royal de la Monnaie in Brussels in 1877. Fanny Salvini-Donatelli died in Milan in June 1891.

== The Traviata "fiasco" ==
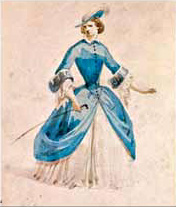
Violetta's costume designed by Giuseppe Bertoja for the premiere of La traviata

Verdi himself described the 1853 premiere of La traviata as a "fiasco". Salvini-Donatelli was 38 years old at the time and quite stout. Her physical unsuitability for playing a beautiful young woman wasting away from tuberculosis is often cited as one of the reasons for the opera's initial failure. In the third act when the doctor announced that Violetta's illness had worsened and she had only hours to live, the first-night audience is said to have burst out laughing, with one member of the public shouting: "I see no consumption, only dropsy!" Verdi himself had expressed serious doubts about Salvini-Donatelli's suitability for the role two months before the premiere and sent his librettist, Francesco Piave, to La Fenice's manager to convey his view that Violetta required a singer "with an elegant figure who is young and sings passionately". His request for a casting change was unsuccessful.

Whatever the audience may have thought of Fanny Salvini-Donatelli's physical appearance, they were appreciative of her singing. Contemporary accounts show that her first act aria, "Sempre libera", received great applause. The critic in La Gazzetta di Venezia wrote the following day: "Salvini-Donatelli sang those coloratura passages, of which the maestro wrote so many, with an indescribable skill and perfection. She captivated the theatre." (Note: Original Italian: "La Salvini-Donatelli cantò que' passi d'agilità, che molti per lei scrisse il maestro, con una perizia e perfezione da non dirsi : ella rapì il teatro." Quoted in Anon. (1854), p. 22.) The "failure" of the opening night performance was only relative. In addition to the applause for Salvini-Donatelli's aria, the orchestral Prelude was so well received that the audience began to shout for Verdi, who had to take curtain calls even before the curtain went up on the first act. Things only started derailing in the second act, especially the singing of the baritone (Felice Varesi) and the tenor (Lodovico Graziani). La traviata also did quite well at the box office. It ran for ten performances at La Fenice that season, with an average evening profit more than double that of Verdi's other two operas in the repertory there, Ernani and Il Corsaro. In any case, a year later it was mounted again at the Teatro San Benedetto in Venice to an indisputably triumphant reception. On that occasion, the role of Violetta was taken by Maria Spezia, who was thirteen years younger and considerably slimmer than Salvini-Donatelli. The first night problems do not appear to have dissuaded Salvini-Donatelli from essaying the role again. She sang it at least three more times: in 1856 in Istanbul, when Luigi Arditi brought the opera to Turkey for the first time; in 1857 at the Teatro Comunale di Bologna (the second revised version with the title Violetta); and in 1858, when she sang it in London at the Drury Lane Theatre.

== Operatic roles ==
Fanny Salvini-Donatelli is known to have sung the following roles: (Note: Data compiled primarily from Casaglia (2005) with additions from Rescigno (2001), Haine & Servais (2004), Dwight (1859) and Conati (1992). This list may not be exhaustive.)

- Verdi
  - Mina, Aroldo
  - Gulnara, Il corsaro
  - Lucrezia, I due Foscari
  - Elvira, Ernani
  - Giovanna, Giovanna d'Arco
  - Giselda, I Lombardi alla prima crociata
  - Lady Macbeth, Macbeth
  - Amalia, I masnadieri
  - Gilda, Rigoletto (under the title of Viscardello)
  - Violetta, La traviata
  - Leonora, Il trovatore
- Donizetti
  - Norina, Don Pasquale
  - Linda, Linda di Chamounix
  - Lucia, Lucia di Lammermoor
  - Lucrezia, Lucrezia Borgia
  - Maria, Maria di Rohan
  - Paolina, Poliuto
- Pacini
  - Editta, Allan Cameron
  - Beatrice, Buondelmonte
  - Lena, Il saltimbanco
- Bellini
  - Elvira, I puritani
  - Beatrice, Beatrice di Tenda
- Rossini
  - Rosina, Il barbiere di Siviglia
- Mercadante
  - Elaisa, Il giuramento
- Petrella
  - Bice, Marco Visconti
- Balfe
  - Olivia Campana, Pittore e duca
- Poniatowski
  - Angiolina, Don Desiderio
- Sarmiento (Note: Salvatore Sarmiento (1817–1869), Italian composer of several operas, religious music, and Neapolitan songs)
  - Elmina, Elmina
- Gualtiero Sanelli (Note: Gualtiero Sanelli (born Parma, 14 May 1816; died Maranhão, Brazil, 15 December 1861). He was the composer of several operas, successful in their day but now forgotten. See "Sanelli, Gualtiero" in Sadie (1992).)
  - Clemenza, Il fornaretto
- Bosoni
  - Donna Eleonora, La prigioniera
- Pedrotti
  - Gelmina, Gelmina
- Platania
  - Matilde, Matilde Bentivoglio
- Peri
  - Tancreda, Tancreda

== Notes and references ==
Notes

Sources

- Anon. (1854). "Teatri – Venezia". Teatri, arti e letteratura (in Italian). Vol. 59, 1853–1854. Bologna: Gov. alla Volpe.
- Anon. (1859). "(review)". Town Talk. Vol. 1, 8 May 1858 – 14 May 1859. H. Tuck.
- Boyden, Matthew; Kimberley, Nick; Staines, Joe (2002). The Rough Guide to Opera. Rough Guides. ISBN 1-85828-749-9.
- Bomberger, E. Douglas (1999). Brainard's Biographies of American Musicians. Greenwood. ISBN 0-313-30782-2.
- Casaglia, Gherardo (2005). "Performances by Fanny Salvini-Donatelli". L'Almanacco di Gherardo Casaglia (in Italian).
- Conati, Marcello (January 1982). "A Chronology of the First Performances of Rigoletto". Bollettino Verdi (in English and Italian). 3 (9). EDT srl: 1853ff. ISBN 88-85065-87-2.
- Conati, Marcello (1992). L' Italia Musicale: 1847–1859. Centro internazionale di ricerca sui periodici musicali, University of Maryland, College Park Center for Studies in Nineteenth-Century Music.
- Dwight, John Sullivan (1859). Dwight's Journal of Music. Vol. 13–14. Oliver Ditson.
- Gatti, Carlo (1955). Verdi, the Man and His Music. Putnam.
- Haine, Malou; Servais, Franz (2004). L'Apollonide de Leconte de Lisle et Franz Servais: 20 ans de collaboration (in French). Éditions Mardaga. ISBN 2-87009-813-8.
- Kimbell, David R. B. (1985). Verdi in the Age of Italian Romanticism. Cambridge University Press Archive. ISBN 0-521-31678-2.
- Phillips-Matz, Mary Jane (1964). "The Truth About Traviata". Opera News. Vol. 28. Metropolitan Opera Guild. Reprinted by the Metropolitan Opera International Radio Broadcast Information Center. Accessed 18 January 2009.
- Phillips-Matz, Mary Jane (February 1995). "Venetian Glories". Opera News.
- Regli, Francesco (1860). Dizionario Biografico dei più celebri poeti ed artisti melodrammatici, tragici e comici, maestri, concertisti, coreografi, mimi ballerini, scenografi, giornalisti impressarii ecc. ecc. che fiorirono in Italia dal 1800 al 1860. Enrico Dalmazzo.
- Rescigno, Eduardo [in Italian] (2001). Dizionario Verdiano (in Italian). Biblioteca Universale Rizzoli. pp. 473–474. ISBN 88-17-86628-8.
- Rosenthal, H.; Warrack, J. (1979). The Concise Oxford Dictionary of Opera (2nd ed.). Oxford University Press.
- Sadie, Stanley, ed. (1992). The New Grove Dictionary of Opera. Macmillan. ISBN 0-935859-92-6.
- Salvini, Celso (1955). Tommaso Salvini: nella storia del teatro italiano e nella vita del suo tempo (in Italian). Cappelli.
- Teatro Regio di Parma. "Serie Carteggi - 1850 – Fasc. III - Spettacoli". Archived from the original on 4 June 2011.
- Von Buchau, Stephanie (1991). "The Traviata Saga". San Francisco Opera June 2009. Archived from the original on 22 January 2009.
