= Antonio Cotogni =

Italian opera singer (1831–1918)

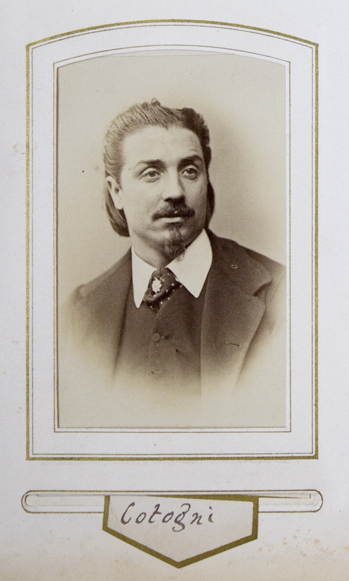
- Antonio Cotogni in the 1860s
- Born: 1 August 1831; Rome, Papal States
- Died: 15 October 1918 (aged 87); Rome, Kingdom of Italy
- Resting place: Campo Verano, Rome
- Monuments: Memorial plaque at Via dei Genovesi, 13, Rome, Italy
- Other names: Toto; Mio ignorantino (Verdi)
- Education: Hospice of San Michele; Santa Maria Maggiore
- Occupations: Operatic baritone Voice teacher
- Years active: 1851–1918
- Title: Cavaliere dell'Ordine della Corona d'Italia; Commendatore dell'Ordine della Corona d'Italia; Commendatore dell'Ordine dei SS. Maurizio e Lazzaro; Cavaliere dell'Ordine di S. Iago; Commendatore del R. Ordine Militare di Nosso Senhor Jesus Christo; Cavaliere del R. Ordine di Carlo III
- Spouse: Maria Ballerini (m. 1858)

Antonio "Toto" Cotogni (Italian pronunciation: [anˈtɔːnjo ˈtɔːto koˈtoɲɲi]; 1 August 1831 – 15 October 1918) was an Italian baritone of the first magnitude. Regarded internationally as being one of the greatest male opera singers of the 19th century, he was particularly admired by the composer Giuseppe Verdi. Cotogni forged an important second career as a singing teacher after his retirement from the stage in 1894.

== Early years and education ==
Antonio Cotogni was born in Rome to Agata Fazzini and Raffaele Cotogni, who managed a small majolica plant. He had four siblings: sister Giuditta (who remained unmarried and lived in the family household); brothers Francesco, Andrea (who owned a meat packing business), and Gaspare (later mayor of Melara).

After some initial studies at the Hospice of San Michele, where he was a student of Angelo Scardovelli, Andrea Salesi, and Ludovico Luccesi. He studied music theory at Santa Maria Maggiore under Fontemaggi. Soon after, he began working with Achille Faldi on the study of singing itself. Under his guidance, Cotogni made his first public ventures into solo singing but only in the principal churches of Rome and in small summer music festivals in the small towns of the province, such as Anagni, Valmontone, Subisco, Velletri, and Viterbo.

Early on, Cotogni worked part-time in a majolica plant and did not care much for theater. He had no pretensions for assuming a career there and was content to remain a church singer. He won his first success in 1851 singing Salvatore Capocci's oratorio Il martirio di Sant'Eustachio at the church of Santa Maria in Vallicella.

About his training prior to his Italian stage debut, Cotogni told a former student:

"For the first year I sang nothing but scales. In the second year, vocal exercises and simple songs. Third year, training in operatic music, chiefly solos. Fourth year, ensembles, duets, trios, etc. Fifth year, training in scenic action, mostly in front of a looking-glass." This may be to a certain extent too rigid a description, but the fact remains that, as Cotogni said, his master considered him fit for the stage when there was not a single opera in the current repertoire which he did not know backwards, and when, as he reproachfully added every time I tried to find an excuse for missing a top note, he could be awakened at 3 a.m. and made to give an A-flat mezza voce. Cotogni sang on the stage for over forty years.

— The Gramophone, November 1924, The Gramophone, Volume 2

== Operatic career ==
=== Debut ===
In 1852, after much insistence from Faldi and castrato Domenico Mustafà, among others, he agreed to sign a contract for his debut at Rome's Teatro Metastasio, as Belcore in L'elisir d'amore. For the next year, he did not sing in public at all but rather studied assiduously with Faldi to build his repertoire. After an initial contract at Spoleto for Il trovatore and Maria di Rohan, he began to pick up consistent work in the Italian regional operatic circuit: Lanciano for Trovatore, Rigoletto, and Maria di Rohan; Orvieto for I masnadieri; Lucrezia Borgia in several cities; I puritani at Perugia.

In the spring of 1857, he was signed by the impresario Jacovacci for Lucia di Lammermoor and Gemma di Vergy at Rome's Teatro Argentina. In September and October of that year, he performed I due Foscari and Luisa Strozzi at Teatro Rossini in Turin. It was then that he met the soprano Maria Ballerini. They married the next year but never had any children together.

Following that, Cotogni was engaged for Foscari and La traviata at Asti and then Cuneo, the Teatro Rossini again, Zara, in Genova, and at Turin for the opening of the new Teatro Alfieri. There he was asked by the impresario Scalaberni to take the place of the famous baritone Felice Varesi in an operatic company being formed for the theater in Nice. During his time in Nice, Cotogni studied the role of Don Giovanni with his predecessor, Italian baritone Antonio Tamburini, who had left the stage in 1855.

=== Breakthrough ===
The turning point in Cotogni's career came in late 1858. As soon as he arrived in Nice for rehearsals in October, he began to feel an air of contempt for his presence from everyone from the theater to public restaurants and cafés. Those who knew and loved Varesi felt that Cotogni, an virtually unknown singer, had been hastily and unfairly chosen to replace him. The first role he was engaged to sing was of Antonio in Gaetano Donizetti's Linda di Chamounix in Nice, where the audience greeted him with noises and whistling before he had even opened his mouth. This same audience fell silent during Antonio's opening aria "Ambo nati in queste valle" and gave him a unanimous, colossal applause after the cadenza, demanding a bis. That performance assured his place on the scene and revealed him to be an absolute master of his art—technically, stylistically, and dramatically. Consequently, this became one of Cotogni's signature roles, one by which he made great impressions on all the great theaters of Europe and even the most sullen critics. In Nice, he followed Linda with Gemma di Vergy, Rigoletto, La favorita, Traviata, Trovatore, Don Pasquale, Roberto Devereux, Don Sebastiano, and Il barbiere di Siviglia.

He sang with enormous success over the next year—I lombardi, Rossini's Otello, and Nabucco in Viterbo; again at Nice for Lucia di Lammermoor, Ernani, Trovatore, and Maria di Rohan; and at Barcelona's Teatro Principal for Saffo, Traviata, Attila, Gemma, Barbiere, and Trovatore. By October 1860, Cotogni had sung in 21 theaters, and it was at this point that he reached La Scala, Milan, debuting there in the role of Giovanni Bandino in Bottesini's L'assedio di Firenze. Cotogni had been nervous about this debuting, doubting his ability to do it justice and doubting the power of his voice to be heard in the theater. The reviews of the debut were encouraging, but one or two critics mentioned a certain tremulousness and constriction in his high notes. But Cotogni regained his composure after the premiere, and won over the Milan public with his other roles that season—William Tell, Peri's Vittor Pisani, Rodolfo in La sonnambula, and Ezio in Attila.

During the ensuing decades, he also appeared at the leading opera houses in Madrid, Lisbon, Paris, London, Moscow, and Saint Petersburg. He became enormously popular with London audiences, performing at the Royal Opera House, Covent Garden, from 1867 to 1889. He sang at Saint Petersburg in 26 successive seasons.

It was in 1894 at Saint Petersburg that he gave his last operatic stage performance, in Donizetti's Don Pasquale. While Cotogni had spent his career singing the opera's baritone role of Dr. Malatesta, the younger baritone Mattia Battistini was now taking over many of the Cotogni's old roles. Nevertheless, Battistini requested Cotogni to honor the company by joining them in one final performance, only this time asking that he sing the lead comic bass role of Don Pasquale, which Cotogni obliged.

== Voice teacher ==
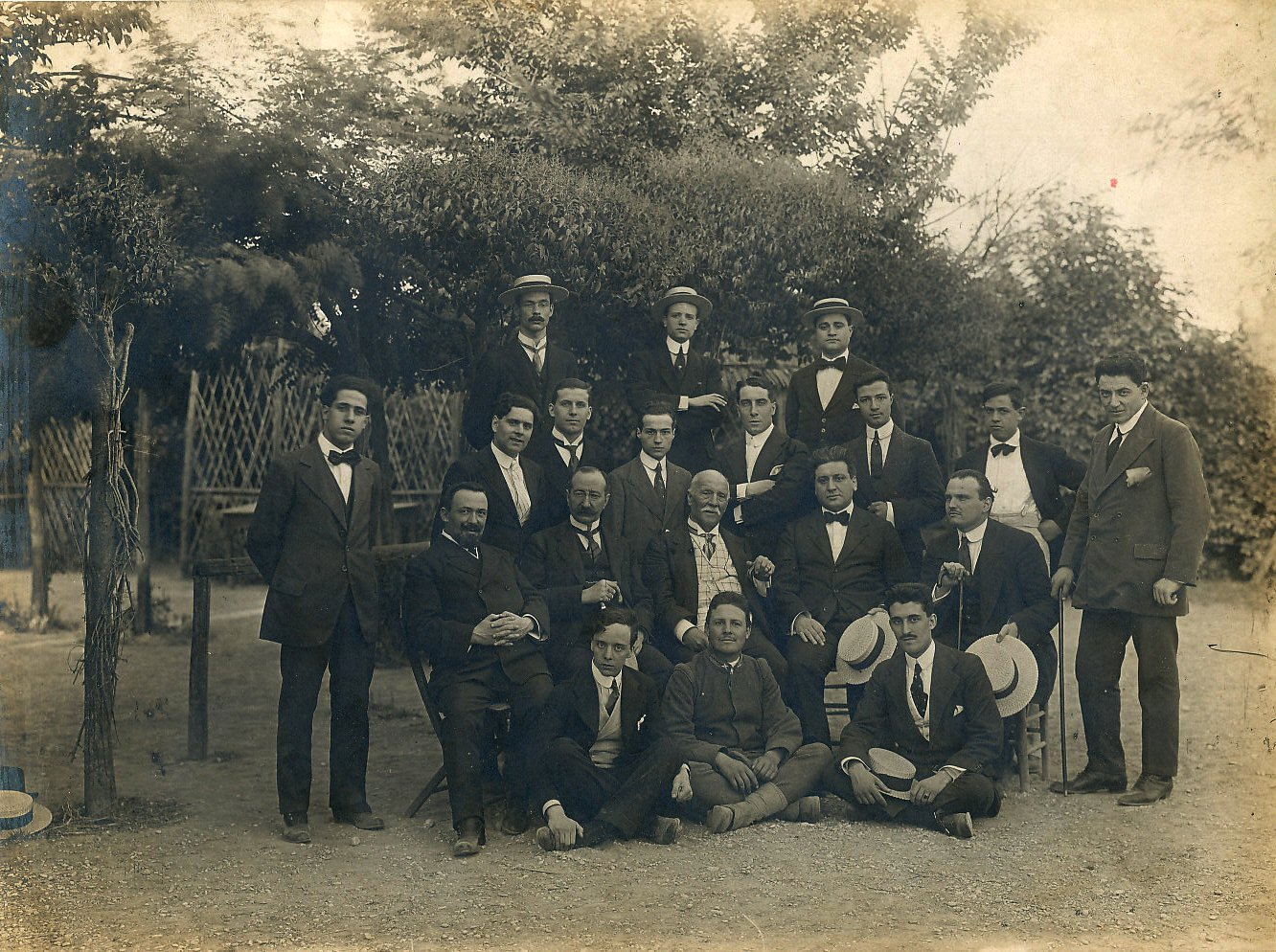
Students from the Accademia di Santa Cecilia on a trip to Frascati, June 18, 1914. Antonio Cotogni (center row, center), tenor Beniamino Gigli (top row, right), teacher Enrico Rosati (seated in chair, 2nd from right), tenor Romeo Rossi (far left), baritone Ugo Donarelli behind Cotogni, accompanist and future coach Luigi Ricci (behind and to the left of Cotogni), future teacher/ coach/conductor Luigi Gerussi (seated on ground, far left).

In retirement, Cotogni became one of the most celebrated vocal teachers in history. At the invitation of Anton Rubinstein, he taught at Saint Petersburg Conservatory (where incidentally he had Sergei Diaghilev as a student) from 1894 to 1898, but he had to abandon this post in consequence of a serious illness, subsequently taking up an appointment in 1899 as a professor at the Accademia di Santa Cecilia in Rome, where his assistant was Enrico Rosati, who was later to become teacher to Beniamino Gigli.

The qualities that made Cotogni beloved in his career on the stage, also made him an effective teacher, one who toiled for his students to provide them what they needed musically, artistically, and often even materially. (Note: "My first professor was the great baritone Antonio Cotogni. He had been on the board of examiners at the entrance examination, and had chosen me then and there to be one of his students. I consider it a privilege to have known Cotogni. He was not only a great artist, but also an exceptionally good and generous man who took a personal interest, not only in the musical progress of his students, but also in their material welfare, going so far as to send anonymous gifts of shoes, an overcoat or even money, when he thought they were needed. He was completely free from the pettiness and envy that are common to so many singers. After having spent almost thirty years as 'the Tsar's baritone' at the Moscow Imperial Theatre, he was still at the height of his fame when another Italian baritone, Battistini, appeared on the Moscow scene. Cotogni immediately decided that his own innings had lasted long enough, and he set about training the younger man as his successor. He called on Battistini unannounced one morning at eight o'clock. Battistini was somewhat taken aback. 'Young man,' said Cotogni without preamble, 'you must lose no time in preparing yourself to take over the role of Don Giovanni. Now, there are certain traditions attached to this role as sung at the Imperial Theatre; let me explain them to you.' The night Battistini made his Moscow début in 'Don Giovanni', Cotogni embraced him in full view of the audience, and then spoke a few words of farewell. He left for Rome the following day, and never sang in opera again. So great was his prestige that the Academy of Santa Cecilia promptly offered him a professorship. When I arrived, he had been teaching there for twenty years or more. I had never known anyone like Cotogni. It thrilled me to sit in his class and think that here I was, being taught by someone who had himself been one of the greatest singers in Europe. Moreover, one felt somehow ennobled by his very presence. It was natural, therefore, that I should have felt indignant when Falchi, the director of the Academy, told me that I was wasting my time in Cotogni's class. Where, I demanded, outraged, could one find a greater, more eminent teacher? The training of my voice, he said, was now his responsibility. Cotogni was over eighty years of age, and his energy was failing. If I wanted to make progress, I should enroll as a student of Maestro Enrico Rosati. I held out stubbornly as long as I could, but Falchi was, after all, the director of the Academy, and in the end I felt obliged to follow his advice. I hardly knew what explanation to give Cotogni, and as for Rosati, I entered his class unwillingly and with a very bad grace.")

During this time, twelve-year-old Luigi Ricci (who would later become a vocal coach) began accompanying voice lessons given by Cotogni, who had performed several of Verdi's operas under the composer's supervision. At this early age, Ricci began taking meticulous notes on traditions that Cotogni passed on to him from his own work with Verdi and other 19th century composers and conductors information about elements that had been changed in rehearsal and practice but had never been notated officially, as well as traditions of variations and cadenza begun by various singers from the past century. Ricci continued his copious note taking throughout his life and eventually compiled these into a four-part collection entitled Variazioni-cadenze tradizioni per canto (two volumes and two appendices published by Casa Ricordi, 1963).

Cotogni died of old age in Rome less than a month prior to the 1918 armistice that ended World War I. A group of his friends, colleagues, and former students raised money for his tomb. His burial chapel is located at plot 98 in the Pincetto Nuovo section of the Campo Verano cemetery in Rome.

=== Students & Protégés ===
Ricci reports that when in 1912 he attended performances at Moscow's Imperial theater and Zimina Opera, as well as at the Imperial Theater in St. Petersburg, half of the artists on stage had been Cotogni's students. For nearly 20 years, Cotogni dedicated himself to teaching singing. Many artists already in the fullness of their careers also came to study with him at the Liceo and/or learn from him privately.

Sortable table
First Name	Last Name	Voice Type
Adolfo	Pacini	Baritone
Alfredo	Costa	Baritone
Amleto	Pollastri	Baritone
Augusto	Beuf	Baritone
Benvenuto	Franci	Baritone
Carlo	Galeffi	Baritone
Cesare	Alessandroni	Baritone
Cesare	Ferretti	Baritone
Dante	Perrone	Baritone
Dinh	Gilly	Baritone
Domenico	Caporello	Baritone
Enrico	Nani	Baritone
Ettore	Bernabei	Baritone
Giuseppe	Bellantoni	Baritone
Giuseppe	De Luca	Baritone
Guido	Caselotti	Tenor
Jean	De Reszke	Baritone
Leone	Paci	Baritone
Luigi	Pasinati	Baritone
Luigi	Rossi-Morelli	Baritone
Mariano	Stabile	Baritone
Marino	Emiliani	Baritone
Mario	Basiola	Baritone
Mattia	Battistini	Baritone
Millo	Picco	Baritone
Nazzareno	Bertinelli	Baritone
Nikolai	Shevelev	Baritone
Onofrio	Pirrone	Baritone
Riccardo	Stracciari	Baritone
Salvatore	Persichetti	Baritone
Sergei	Diaghilev	Baritone
Titta	Ruffo	Baritone
Evgeny	Dolinin	Tenor
Ugo	Donarelli	Baritone
Valentino	Giorda	Baritone
Zygmunt (Sigismondo)	Zaleski	Baritone
Aristodemo	Giorgini	Tenor
Armando	Gualtieri	Tenor
Beniamino	Gigli	Tenor
Pasquale	Funtò	Tenor
Edgar	Herbert-Caesari	Tenor
Ellison	Van Hoose	Tenor
Enzo	Fusco	Tenor
Franco	Tumminello	Tenor
Giacomo	Eliseo	Tenor
Giacomo	Lauri-Volpi	Tenor
Giuliano	Romagnoli	Tenor
Giuseppe Antonio	Paganelli	Tenor
Guido	Ciccolini	Tenor
Julian	Biel	Tenor
Luigi	Ceccarelli	Tenor
Luigi	Lucenti	Tenor
Luigi	Pasinati	Tenor
Manfredo	Miselli	Tenor
Nicola	Bavaro	Tenor
Rinaldo	Grassi	Tenor
Vincenzo	Tanglongo	Tenor
Berardo	Berardi	Bass
Alfred	Blackman	Bass
Emilio	Casolari	Bass
Filippo	Valentine	Bass
Gennaro	Curci	Bass
Giuseppe	Quinzi Tapergi	Bass
Irnerio	Costantini	Bass
Paolo	Argentini	Bass
Tadeusz	Orda	Bass
Tito	Verger	Bass
Umberto	Di Lelio	Bass
Virgilio	Lazzari	Bass
Vladimir	Kastorsky	Bass
Carmen	Melis	Soprano
Marta	Wittkowska	Contralto
Cecilia	Cao Pinna	Mezzo-Soprano

== Voice ==
As a child, Cotogni had merely a weak soprano voice, but it did begin to increase in volume and darken, turning later into a contralto voice. As a teenager, his voice finally began to break into that of a young man, and the head music teacher Scardovelli forbade him to sing; Cotogni grudgingly obeyed and was silent for about six months. After this period of rest, he began to find a few notes, then went on to enrich and strengthen his vocal means continuously until the complete development of a baritone voice.

=== Range ===
According to his biographer, Cotogni's professional/usable vocal range was from A_{1} to B_{4}, though a handful of his roles and even his interpolations and cadenzas require a half-step lower—A♭_{1}. According to Ricci, his other noted interpolations include a high G♯ in Posa's romanza "Carlo, ch'è sol il nostro amore" in Don Carlo; high A♭'s in "O de verd'anni miei" and "O sommo Carlo" from Ernani and the end of "Suoni la tromba" in I puritani; and a quick high A♮in a roulade on the word "piacere" in "Largo al factotum" from Il barbiere di Siviglia. He did, however, chide Titta Ruffo for interpolating an unwritten high B♭ in Hamlet. (Note: "not only because it was foreign to the baritone register, but because nature had granted [Ruffo] a voice so beautiful and rich that [he] had no need to borrow effects from elsewhere.") It is therefore unlikely that Cotogni ever sang a note above the high A♮ in public performance. Of physiological interest is the fact that Cotogni suffered from a lateral lisp that affected his speech but that disappeared when he sang. (Note: "A most remarkable illustration of this was the famous baritone, Cotogni, who used to sing Figaro to Patti's Rosina at Covent Garden in Rossini's Barbiere. His delivery of the ' Largo al factotum ' was as quick and lively as that of the present-day Titta Ruffo, and certainly more distinct; and in the recitative of the Figaro of Le Nozze his clear utterance was beyond reproach. Yet it is a fact of which all his friends were aware that Cotogni suffered from an impediment in his speech which in ordinary conversation was painfully evident. He did not stammer — people who stammer badly but do not hesitate when singing or reciting are not uncommon. He made a whistling sound with the sides of his tongue against his teeth that was worse than a lisp. The moment he began to sing it entirely disappeared.")

The famed Italian conductor Toscanini remarked that Cotogni's voice was totally even and that "one didn't hear the transition between the registers... Hearing it, it seemed that everything was natural, while, instead, the poor Cotogni had practiced for years and years to acquire that perfection."

=== Critical reception ===
Journalistic reviews of his performances were often superlative.

A full voice that is mellow, flexible, and well-schooled; persona; expression; and mastery of the scene all combine to make Cotogni the model artist, a perfect singer. The public hangs on every word from his lips. The pathetic scene of the recognition of the daughter, Cotogni masterfully portrayed the truth, singing and reciting his part with heartbreaking accent. He painted ever so gently his romance "Ambo nati," and the first act duet with the thunderous Nannetti[...] was a real delirium, [stirring] unheard of fanaticism. Even I, an old theatergoer, have never heard the duet performed with such color, with so much strength and homogeneity.

— a critic, of an 1886 performance of Linda di Chamounix at Firenze

Cotogni, who can well be called the prince of baritones today, has definitively captivated the audience. This singer, of a voice both powerful and suave, really is something extraordinary. He sings like few can sing, and although his part fraught with difficulties, he breaks down everything and overcomes them with ease, with astounding ownership; in him one find not effort nor the slightest fatigue: even if sometimes he has been singing with full vibration and power, his voice can still come out quiet and safe. His ways are often exceptional, and not content with the difficulties inherent to the score, he will add new ones—always tasteful, and it seems he delights in defying them. The voice of this singer leaves an everlasting impression on you.

— Pietro Faustini, Gazzetta Musicale di Milano

The voice of the Cotogni is full, smooth, equal, of a most sympathetic timbre, and it moves the audience especially when he sings a fior di labbra. This most perfect artist makes every one of his parts into a creation. With great difficulty could there ever arise another singer who could emulate him; surpass him, never.

— Carlo Schmidl, Dizionario universale dei musicisti

=== Gramophone recording ===
Cotogni ranks with his contemporaries Francesco Graziani (baritone), Jean-Baptiste Faure and Sir Charles Santley as the foremost baritone of his star-studded generation. He "had a very brief and scarcely revealing relationship with the gramophone; at the age of 77... with the tenor Francesco Marconi, he recorded [the] duet 'I mulattieri'" (by Francesco Masini), writes Michael Scott. "Not surprisingly Marconi gets the better of it. Still, however difficult it is to make out Cotogni's contribution, it is all we have left of a singer who for over 40 years dominated the stages in London, Madrid and Lisbon, St. Petersburg and Moscow and throughout Italy."

Two other recordings, at times believed to be of Cotogni, are in fact the voice of tenore robusto Francesco Tamagno's brother, Giovanni. Comparisons of these two recordings—"O casto fior" and Stanislao Gastaldon's "Ti vorrei rapire" (formerly misidentified as "Perché?")—with the Tamagno brothers' recording of the Otello duet "Si pel ciel" reveals the baritone voice to be identical in timbre and production, with its thin and nasal qualities, especially in the passagio. These stand in contradistinction to the voice confirmed to be Cotogni's (the Mulattieri duet), which is noticeably more even, round, and sonorous throughout—even to the two high G naturals that end the refrain. In the Roman school, and in Cotogni's own teaching, any nasality was seen as a defect to be expressly avoided.

== Repertoire ==
According to his biographer Angelucci, Cotogni sang one hundred fifty-seven works, but the former was only able to cite one hundred and forty-five. Of the other twelve, he could track down neither the title nor the name of the composer.

Sortable table
Composer Surname	Composer	Opera/Oratorio	Role	City of role debut
Amadei	Roberto Amadei	Luchino Visconti		Lugo
Auber	Daniel Auber	Diamanti della corona	Rebolledo	London
Auber	Daniel Auber	Le domino noir	Gil Perez	London
Auber	Daniel Auber	Masaniello	Pietro	Lisbon
Battista	Vincenzo Battista	Esmeralda		Lanciano
Beethoven	Ludwig van Beethoven	Fidelio	Don Pizarro	London
Bellini	Vincenzo Bellini	Beatrice di Tenda	Filippo	Venice
Bellini	Vincenzo Bellini	I Capuleti ed i Montecchi	Lorenzo	Genova
Bellini	Vincenzo Bellini	I puritani	Riccardo	Milan
Bellini	Vincenzo Bellini	La sonnambula	Rodolfo	London
Berlioz	Hector Berlioz	La damnation de Faust	Méphistophélès	Rome
Bevenuti	Tommaso Bevenuti	La stella di Toledo	Filippo II	Genova
Bizet	Georges Bizet	Carmen	Escamillo	Lisbon
Bottesini	Giovanni Bottesini	L'assedio di Firenze	Giovanni Bandino	Milan
Brahms	Johannes Brahms	A German Requiem	baritone soloist	Rome
Cagnoni	Antonio Cagnoni	Claudia		Milan
Cagnoni	Antonio Cagnoni	Don Bucefalo		Trieste
Cagnoni	Antonio Cagnoni	Il vecchio della montagna	Hassan	Milan
Capocci	Salvatore Capocci	Sant'eustachio: azione sacra in due atti		Rome
Centolani	Ambrogio Centolani	Isabella Orsini		Lugo
Cimarosa	Domenico Cimarosa	Le astuzie femminili	Dottor Romualdo	London
Cimarosa	Domenico Cimarosa	Il matrimonio segreto	Count Robinson	Madrid
Clementi	Filippo Clementi	Pellegrina	Iacopo	Bologna
Coccia	Carlo Coccia	Disertore per amore		Asti
Cohen	Henri Cohen	Estella		London
De Ferrari	Serafino Amedeo De Ferrari	Pipelet, ossia Il portinajo di Parigi		Nizza
De Ferrari	Serafino De-Ferrari	Il birraio di Preston		Orvieto
De Giosa	Nicola de Giosa	Don Checco		Lanciano
Delibes	Léo Delibes	Jean de Nivelle	Le comte de Charolais	St. Petersburg
Donizetti	Gaetano Donizetti	Belisario	Belisario	Trieste
Donizetti	Gaetano Donizetti	Don Pasquale	Dr. Malatesta	London
Donizetti	Gaetano Donizetti	Don Pasquale	Don Pasquale	London
Donizetti	Gaetano Donizetti	L'elisir d'amore	Belcore	Rome
Donizetti	Gaetano Donizetti	La favorita	Alfonso	Rome
Donizetti	Gaetano Donizetti	Gemma di Vergy	Earl of Vergy	Rome
Donizetti	Gaetano Donizetti	Linda di Chamounix	Antonio	Genova
Donizetti	Gaetano Donizetti	Lucia di Lammermoor	Enrico	Rome
Donizetti	Gaetano Donizetti	Lucrezia Borgia	Alfonso	London
Donizetti	Gaetano Donizetti	Maria di Rohan	Enrico, duca di Chevreuse	Spoleto
Donizetti	Gaetano Donizetti	I martiri	Severo	Barcelona
Donizetti	Gaetano Donizetti	Poliuto	Severo	Barcelona
Donizetti	Gaetano Donizetti	Alina, regina di Golconda	Volmar	Bilbao
Donizetti	Gaetano Donizetti	Roberto Devereux	The Duke of Nottingham	Nice
Donizetti	Gaetano Donizetti	Torquato Tasso	Torquato Tasso	Modena
Faccio	Franco Faccio	Amleto	Claudio	Genova
Faccio	Franco Faccio	I profughi fiamminghi	Il conte di Bergh	Milano
Fioravanti	Vincenzo Fioravanti	Il ritorno di Columella		Torino
Flotow	Friedrich von Flotow	Alma l'incantatrice	Don Sebastian	London
Flotow	Friedrich von Flotow	Marta	Plunkett	Madrid
Gammieri	Erennio Gammieri	Niccolò de' Lapi		Saint Petersburg
Gentili	Raffaele Gentili	Rosamonda	Edgardo	Rome
Gentili	Raffaele Gentili	Werther	Il Conte Alberto di Volheim	Milan
Gomes	Antônio Carlos Gomes	Il Guarany	Gonzales	London
Gounod	Charles Gounod	Faust	Valentin	Rome
Gounod	Charles Gounod	Philémon et Baucis	Jupiter	Saint Petersburg
Gounod	Charles Gounod	Roméo et Juliette	Mercutio and Capulet	London
Gounod	Charles Gounod	Cinq-Mars		Saint Petersburg
Halévy	Fromental Halévy	L'ebrea	Ruggiero	London
Hérold	Ferdinand Hérold	Le pré aux clercs	Comte de Comminges	London
Hérold	Ferdinand Hérold	Zampa	Zampa	Bologna
Kashperov	Vladimir Kashperov	Maria Tudor		Nice
Lenepveu	Charles Lenepveu	Velleda	Teuter	London
Leoncavallo	Ruggero Leoncavallo	I pagliacci	Tonio	Saint Petersburg
Liszt	Franz Liszt	Christus	Christ	Rome
Lucilla	Domenico Lucilla	Il conte Rosso		Bologna
Lucilla	Domenico Lucilla	Eroe delle Asturie		Bologna
Manna	Ruggero Manna	Preziosa	Don Fernando d'Azevedo	Milan
Marchetti	Filippo Marchetti	Romeo e Giulietta		Genoa
Marchetti	Filippo Marchetti	Ruy Blas	Don Sallustio	Venice
Mascagni	Pietro Mascagni	Cavalleria Rusticana	Alfio	Saint Petersburg
Massenet	Jules Massenet	Le Cid	Don Fernando, King of Castille	Saint Petersburg
Mendelssohn	Felix Mendelssohn	St. Paul	bass	Rome
Mercadante	Francesco Mercadante	Il giuramento	Manfredo	Cuneo
Mercadante	Francesco Mercadante	I normanni a Parigi	Ordamante	Modena
Mercadante	Francesco Mercadante	Orazi e Curiazi	Orazio	Perugia
Mercadante	Francesco Mercadante	La vestale	Publio	Nice
Meyerbeer	Giacomo Meyerbeer	L'africana	Nélusko	Bologna
Meyerbeer	Giacomo Meyerbeer	Dinorah	Hoël	London
Meyerbeer	Giacomo Meyerbeer	La stella del nord	Peter the Great	London
Meyerbeer	Giacomo Meyerbeer	Gli ugonotti	Nevers	London
Mozart	Wolfgang Amadeus Mozart	Così fan tutte	Guglielmo	London
Mozart	Wolfgang Amadeus Mozart	Don Giovanni	Don Giovanni	London
Mozart	Wolfgang Amadeus Mozart	Il flauto magico	Papageno	London
Mozart	Wolfgang Amadeus Mozart	Le nozze di Figaro	Figaro	London
Mozart	Wolfgang Amadeus Mozart	Le nozze di Figaro	Count	London
Mugnone	Leopoldo Mugnone	Birichino	Blachot	Venice
Pacini	Giovanni Pacini	Bondelmonte		Bilbao
Pacini	Giovanni Pacini	Saffo	Alcandro	Barcelona
Paladilhe	Émile Paladilhe	Patria	Comte de Rysoor	Rome
Pedrotti	Carlo Pedrotti	Il favorito	Obolenski	Turin
Pedrotti	Carlo Pedrotti	Guerra in quattro	Candido	Milan
Pedrotti	Carlo Pedrotti	Isabella d'Aragona		Milan
Pedrotti	Carlo Pedrotti	Tutti in maschera	Abdalà	Trieste
Peri	Achille Peri	Vittore Pisani	Vittore Pisani	Milan
Persichini	Venceslao Persichini	Amante Sessagenario		Rome
Petrella	Enrico Petrella	L'assedio di Leida	Armando Boasot	Turin
Petrella	Enrico Petrella	Celinda	Arnaldo	Turin
Petrella	Enrico Petrella	Giovanna di Napoli	Marino	Turin
Petrella	Enrico Petrella	Ione	Arbace	Saragozza
Petrella	Enrico Petrella	Marco Visconti	Marco Visconti	Barcelona
Petrella	Enrico Petrella	Elnava		Cuneo
Piacenza	Pasquale Piacenza	Marinella		Cuneo
Ponchielli	Amilcare Ponchielli	La gioconda	Barnaba	St. Petersburg
Ponchielli	Amilcare Ponchielli	I lituani	Arnoldo	St. Petersburg
Poniatowski	Józef Michał Poniatowski	Gelmina		London
Puccinelli	Filippo Puccinelli	Santa Cecilia		Rome
Puccini	Giacomo Puccini	Manon Lescaut	Lescaut	St. Petersburg
Ricci	Luigi Ricci	Chiara di Rosemberg		Nice
Ricci	Luigi Ricci	Chi dura la vince		Nice
Ricci	Luigi Ricci	Crispino e la Comare	Fabrizio	Venice
Ricci	Luigi Ricci	Le Prigioni di Edimburgo		Nice
Rossi	Lauro Rossi	Domino Nero		Turin
Rossi	Lauro Rossi	Falsi Monetari		Turin
Rossini	Gioacchino Rossini	Il barbiere di Siviglia	Figaro	Genova
Rossini	Gioacchino Rossini	La Cenerentola	Dandini	Nice
Rossini	Gioacchino Rossini	La gazza ladra	Fernando Villabella	London
Rossini	Gioacchino Rossini	Guglielmo Tell	Guglielmo	St. Petersburg
Rossini	Gioacchino Rossini	Matilde di Shabran	Aliprando	Turin
Rossini	Gioacchino Rossini	Mosè	Faraone	London
Rossini	Gioacchino Rossini	Otello	Iago	Nice
Rossini	Gioacchino Rossini	Stabat mater	Baritone soloist	Rome
Rubinstein	Antonio Rubinstein	Nerone	Julius Vindex	St. Petersburg
Sanelli	Gualtiero Sanelli	Luisa Strozzi		Turin
Sinico	Giuseppe Sinico	Aurora di Nevers	Filippo Conzaga	Milan
Thomas	Ambroise Thomas	Amleto	Hamlet	London
Thomas	Ambroise Thomas	Mignon	Lothario	Rome
Ventura	Lionello Ventura	Alda	Marino Capece	Bologna
Vera	Edoardo Vera	Valeria	Claudio Imperatore	Bologna
Verdi	Giuseppe Verdi	Aïda	Amonasro	St. Petersburg
Verdi	Giuseppe Verdi	Aroldo	Egberto	Turin
Verdi	Giuseppe Verdi	Attila	Ezio	Zara
Verdi	Giuseppe Verdi	Un ballo in maschera	Renato	Dublin
Verdi	Giuseppe Verdi	Don Carlos	Posa	London
Verdi	Giuseppe Verdi	I due Foscari	Francesco Foscari	London
Verdi	Giuseppe Verdi	Ernani	Don Carlo	Rome
Verdi	Giuseppe Verdi	La forza del destino	Don Carlo di Vargas	Spoleto
Verdi	Giuseppe Verdi	I lombardi	Pagano	Milan
Verdi	Giuseppe Verdi	Luisa Miller	Miller	Turin
Verdi	Giuseppe Verdi	Macbeth	Macbeth	Nice
Verdi	Giuseppe Verdi	I masnadieri	Francesco	Viterbo
Verdi	Giuseppe Verdi	Nabucco	Nabucco	Turin
Verdi	Giuseppe Verdi	Rigoletto	Rigoletto	Rome
Verdi	Giuseppe Verdi	Stiffelio	Count Stankar	London
Verdi	Giuseppe Verdi	La traviata	Germont	Viterbo
Verdi	Giuseppe Verdi	Il trovatore	Di Luna	Madrid
Verdi	Giuseppe Verdi	I vespri siciliani	Michele de Vasconcello/Guido di Monforte	Turin
Wagner	Richard Wagner	Lohengrin	Telramund	Turin
Wagner	Richard Wagner	Tannhaüser	Wolfram	Bologna
Weber	Carl Maria von Weber	Oberon	Scherasmin	Bologna

Cotogni also sang the baritone solo in the "Dies irae" section of Alessandro Busi's Messa da requiem performed in honor of Gioachino Rossini's death on 9 December 1868 at the church of San Giovanni in Monte in Bologna. His delivery of the solo was sublime: "...the audience, who literally filled the church, was so shaken that, forgetting they were in church, they applauded [his solo] wildly." That response was not unfamiliar; when he made his public debut in Sant'Eustachio in 1851, the audience's surprise and enthusiasm toward the young Cotogni's solo was so overwhelming that police had to be called in to restore order.

== Legacy ==
During his career, Cotogni was an especial favorite of Verdi's, who praised him for the beauty, warmth and strength of his voice, as well as for the emotional intensity which he brought to his musical interpretations. He sang most of the major Verdi baritone roles and took part in the first Italian staging of Don Carlo, in Bologna in 1867, under the supervision of the composer. Verdi, wanting to test out the abilities of Cotogni, privately heard him in several of the key pieces from Don Carlo. When rehearsing the phrases leading up to the duet "Dio, che nell'alma infondere", Cotogni deviated from what Verdi had written, and though Verdi remarked on it, he accepted Cotogni's change, saying that it was actually better, with the result that the markings were changed in the new editions of the score. (Note: 'Nella prima edizione del Don Carlo, Verdi scrisse la frase "Carlo mio, con me dividi" così: [printed music phrase] Alla quarta battuta scrisse: dolcissimo e pp. Cotogni non senti in tal modo la frase. Rodrigo darà la sua vita per l'amicizia e nell'incrontro con Don Carlo, in un momento che ha bisogno di conforto, deve quasi esplodere, con tutta forza, dal cuore l'amicizia. Cotogni, invece di: dolcissimo e pp intese tale frase con crescendo e ff e Verdi l'accettò, tanto che nell nuove edizioni riformate da Lui stesso, tolse il dolcissimo e pp.') It became well known that Verdi was moved to tears by Cotogni's singing of Rodrigo's death scene at this test rehearsal. (Note: 'At noon – so [Cotogni] told me himself – I came to the house and was told that the maestro, still absent, he about to return. He returned shortly thereafter in fact outfitted for the countryside, with muddy clothes. Seeing him in that getup, rather than disturbing him, I tried to hide, but he had seen me and without giving me time to utter a word, he reached out his hand and said: "You're the baritone Cotogni, are you not? All right: Mariani already wrote me about you, and I have the pleasure of seeing you here and hearing you... Come, come with me." And with that, he took me to his study, took out the score of Don Carlo and: "Right then, sing the entrance aria," he said preluding. – You cannot imagine – Cotogni continued to narrate, with his usual modesty and sincerity — what I felt at that point! I was no longer myself: but I got over it and as God wanted, I sang "Carlo ch'è solo il nostro amore." But in the awe of that supreme test, well I stared at Verdi with feverish anxiety, to scrutinize what kind of impression he had of my singing; and the impression was good, because he approved the final cadence in a loud voice: "Bravo! Now let's hear the duet; I'll do the tenor part," the maestro said to me. The duet was my forte, and except for one point where I interpreted differently from the will of the author, nothing bothered me. However I just sang it the way I felt it, perhaps even in defiance of a warning, and Verdi stopped, looked at me and said: "You didn't execute this here as I've written it; but no matter; sing it that way, which is great; in fact, it's probably better... That crescendo gives a good effect.. And now to finish, sing the death scene." — That was what I wanted, and getting myself all worked up again, I sang the aria "Per me giunto é il dì supremo," singing it as perhaps I had never sung in my life. I put into it all the ardor of my soul, and because of the emotion, I felt my face getting wet with tears! I finished exhausted, but an ineffable joy soon flooded my heart when I realized that the maestro was crying too!... "Well done, my ignorantino!" – he said, squeezing my hand – "bravo! Go ahead to Bologna and tell Mariani I cried hearing you sing!..." – I went back to Bologna fully satisfied and waited for the first performance of Don Carlo with the utmost calm. After having sung in the presence of Verdi, the audience of the Communale didn't really bother me.') Many who knew Cotogni admired him for his almost extreme modesty and humility; Verdi was no different, only teasing him about it with his own nickname for him—mio ignorantino ("my little ignoramus"). Even after his retirement from opera, he continued singing in benefits and concerts, the very last of which was in 1904, when Cotogni was 73.

Cotogni's repertoire comprised between 150 and 160 roles. His operatic triumphs were not confined to Verdi's compositions. He was also an exponent of the elegant but technically demanding bel canto music of Gioachino Rossini, Gaetano Donizetti, Vincenzo Bellini, and Saverio Mercadante. He sang roles from the new Italian verismo literature, the French grand opera tradition, and some Wagner. He was considered a Mozart specialist and keeper of some traditions of his works, even at a time when Mozart's works were not popular. He was particularly proud of his Don Giovanni, a role that he learned from his predecessor, the Italian baritone Antonio Tamburini, and which Cotogni then passed on to the inheritor of his traditions, Mattia Battistini.

Cotogni sang in the company of many of the most famous opera singers of his time—sopranos Adelina Patti, Teresa Stolz, Thérèse Tietjens, Marcella Sembrich, Christina Nilsson, Emma Albani, and Gemma Bellincioni; castrato Alessandro Moreschi; the Marchisio sisters; contralto Sofia Scalchi; tenors Mario, Francesco Marconi, Julián Gayarre, Angelo Masini, Pietro Mongini, Lodovico Graziani, Enrico Tamberlick, and Francesco Tamagno; baritones Charles Santley, Jean-Baptiste Faure, Francesco Graziani, Leone Giraldoni, and Mattia Battistini; and basses Foli, Eraclito Bagagiolo, and Édouard de Reszke.

== Sources ==
- Nino Angelucci, Ricordi di una artista, Antonio Cotogni (Roma, 1907). ISBN 978-1148413716
- Roland Mancini and Jean-Jacques Rouveroux, (orig. H. Rosenthal and J. Warrack, French edition), Guide de l'opéra, Les indispensables de la musique (Fayard, 1995). ISBN 2-213-59567-4
- Arthur Eaglefield Hull (Ed.), A Dictionary of Modern Music and Musicians (Dent, London and Toronto 1924).
