= Bosoni =

Bosoni is a surname. Notable people with the surname include:

- Carlo Ercole Bosoni (1826–1887), Italian composer and conductor
- Giorgio Boccardo Bosoni (born 1982), Chilean politician
