= Francesco Graziani (baritone) =

Italian opera singer

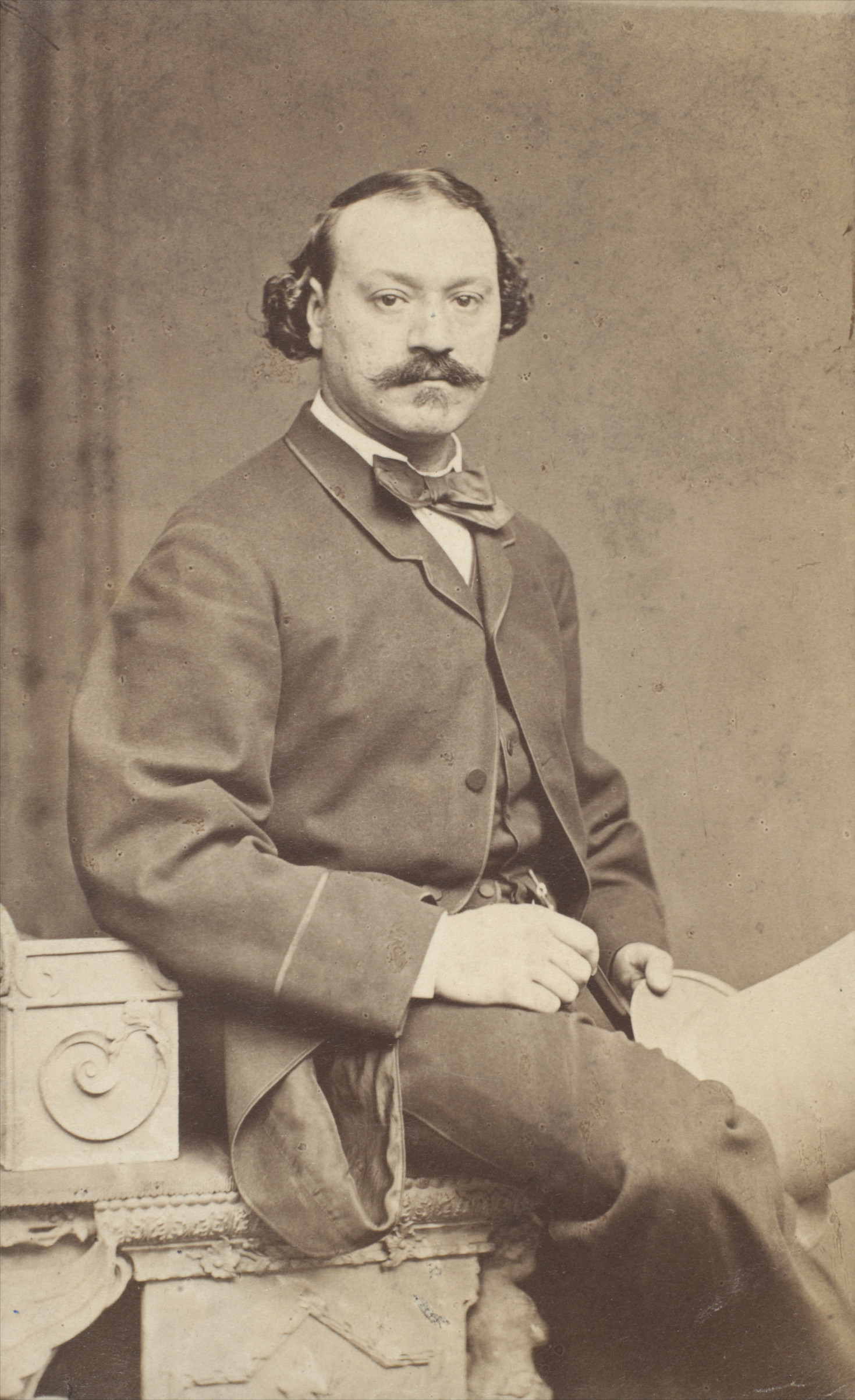
- Born: 26 April 1828; Fermo, Italy
- Died: 30 June 1901 (aged 73); Fermo, Italy
- Occupations: Baritone, Voice Teacher
- Notable work: Collaborations with Giuseppe Verdi
- Family: Lodovico Graziani (brother) Vincenzo Graziani (brother) Giuseppe Graziani (brother)

Francesco Graziani (26 April 1828 – 30 June 1901) was an Italian baritone and voice teacher. Graziani has been called the first modern baritone because his vocal attributes were well suited to the high-lying operatic parts composed by Giuseppe Verdi, with whom he worked.

== Early life and career ==
Graziani was born in 1828 in Fermo, Italy. His older brother, Lodovico Graziani (1820–1885), was a dramatic tenor.

He studied with Cellini and made his debut in Italy in 1851 at Ascoli Piceno in Donizetti's Gemma di Vergy. The next season, he sang in Macerata, performing Francesco in Verdi's I masnadieri.

Graziani also appeared at the Salle Ventadour with the Théâtre-Italien from 1853 to 1861, where he particularly excelled in the operas of Verdi, creating for Paris the role of Count di Luna in Il trovatore and also singing Germont in La traviata, the title role in Rigoletto, and Renato in Un ballo in maschera.

In the summer of 1854, he performed with Max Maretzek's Italian opera company at Castle Garden in New York City.

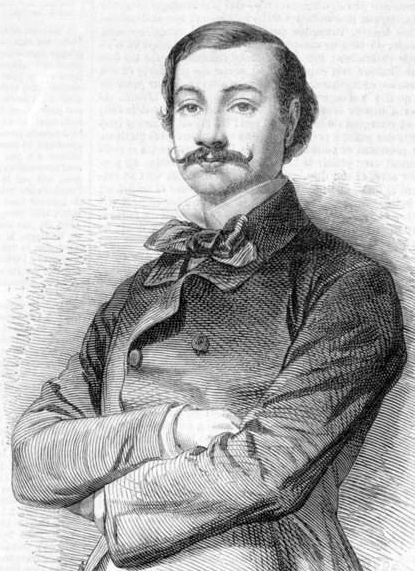
Francesco Graziani, 1855

He appeared at the Royal Opera House, Covent Garden from 1855 to 1880. His debut was on 26 April as Carlo in Verdi's Ernani, followed by Count di Luna in Verdi's Il Trovatore on 10 May, Riccardo in Bellini's I puritani on 17 May, Alfonso in Donizetti's La favorita on 24 May, and Iago in Rossini's Otello on 7 August. He performed the role of Nelusco in the 1865 London premiere of Giacomo Meyerbeer's L'Africaine. Among the other roles he sang in London were the title role in Rigoletto, Renato in Un ballo in maschera, Posa in Don Carlo, and Amonasro in Aida (all by Verdi). His last performance at the house was as Germont in La traviata with Adelina Patti on 17 July in the final performance of the 1880 season.

At St Petersburg, on 10 November 1862, he had cemented a spot in operatic history by creating the role of Don Carlos in the first performance of Verdi's La forza del destino.

The range of Graziani's voice extended up to A4 and it was much praised by contemporary critics for its smoothness, beauty and ease of production, but his histrionic skills were said to be of a less compelling standard.

Graziani later moved to Berlin, where he became a voice teacher. Among his pupils was the American soprano Geraldine Farrar.

He died on 30 June 1901, at his birthplace, Fermo, in Italy.

During his career, Graziani had faced strong competition on stage from a number of other outstanding Italian baritones. Probably the greatest of his immediate rivals was Roman-born Antonio Cotogni, whose voice was of similar quality and range to Graziani's.

== Graziani brothers ==
Francesco Graziani had three brothers who also sang professionally:

- Giuseppe Graziani (born Fermo, 28 August 1819; died Porto San Giorgio, 6 March 1905) was a bass. He studied with Saverio Mercadante in Naples and performed primarily in concerts.
- Lodovico Graziani (born Fermo, 14 November 1820; died Fermo, 15 May 1885) became a well-known tenor. He created the role of Alfredo in Verdi's La traviata at La Fenice.
- Vincenzo Graziani (born Fermo, 16 February 1836; died Fermo, 2 November 1906) became a baritone. His debut in 1862 was as Belcore in Donizetti's L'elisir d'amore. He gave up his career early, after an illness caused him to become partially deaf.
