= Lodovico Graziani =

Italian opera singer (1820–1885)

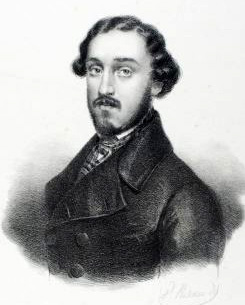
- Graziani in c. 1845
- Born: 14 November 1820; Fermo, Italy
- Died: 15 May 1885 (aged 64); Fermo, Italy
- Occupation: Opera singer (tenor)
- Relatives: Francesco Graziani (brother)

Lodovico Graziani (14 November 1820 – 15 May 1885) was an Italian operatic tenor. According to John Warrack and Ewan West, writing in The Oxford Dictionary of Opera: "His voice was clear and vibrant, but he lacked dramatic gifts." He is now mainly remembered for having created the role of Alfredo Germont in the world premiere of Giuseppe Verdi's La traviata in 1853.

== Career ==
Graziani was born in Fermo, Italy, into a musical family. Three of his brothers also became professional singers, in particular his younger brother Francesco Graziani, who became a well-known baritone and spent much of his career singing for the Royal Italian Opera (Covent Garden) in London. Lodovico studied with Cellini and made his debut in 1845 in Bologna in Carlo Cambiaggio's Don Procopio. In 1846, he was heard at the Regio Teatro degli Avvalorati in Livorno as Elvino in Vincenzo Bellini's La sonnambula. He made his debut at La Scala on 14 August 1847 in the title role of Gaetano Donizetti's Dom Sébastien.

In 1851, at the Théâtre-Italien's Salle Ventadour in Paris, Graziani sang Gennaro in Donizetti's Lucrezia Borgia with Marianna Barbieri-Nini in the title role and Fortini as the Duke of Ferrara. The following season he went to La Fenice in Venice where he was heard as Idreno in Rossini's Semiramide, the Duke of Mantua in Rigoletto, the title role of Verdi's Stiffelio, and in the premieres of several operas by minor Italian composers. In his second season there, on 6 March 1853, he created the role of Alfredo in Verdi's La traviata. The production was poorly received, and Verdi, who was depressed and disappointed, described Graziani's singing as "marmoreal" and "monotonous", although most of the blame for the opera's lack of success was reserved for the baritone Felice Varesi, who sang Giorgio Germont. Graziani had not been well — one performance was cancelled because of his indisposition. Later in his career, in other Verdi roles, Graziani was more successful.

Graziani returned to the Théâtre-Italien for the 1854–1855 season to sing Manrico in Verdi's Il trovatore, with the contralto Adelaide Borghi-Mamo as Azucena. Verdi, who was in Paris at the time working on the Opéra's production of Les vêpres siciliennes, was somehow persuaded by the Italien's director Calzado to not only sanction the production, but to help supervise, without a fee. The performances, which introduced the opera to Paris beginning on 23 December 1854, were successful. (The next year, Verdi sued the company for mounting productions of La traviata and Rigoletto with unauthorized material, but lost the case.)

Graziani returned to La Scala in 1855 in Giuseppe Apolloni's L'ebreo, and in 1862 performed there as Riccardo in Verdi's Un ballo in maschera. Other Verdi roles at La Scala included the Duke of Mantua in Rigoletto and Enrico (Henri) in Giovanna de Guzman (the name used for the first Italian version of Les vêpres siciliennes).

He sang the title role in Donizetti's Dom Sébastien at the Teatro San Carlo in Naples in 1856, and the role of Vasco da Gama in the first Italian performance of Meyerbeer's L'Africaine in Bologna in 1865. He also performed in Vienna (1860).

Graziani had also been a keen amateur chess player. He studied the game with Jean-Louis Preti and once played Paul Morphy after which he reportedly said: "If anybody asks me if I understand chess, I shall say, 'Oh, yes; I play sometimes with Mr. Morphy.'"

Graziani died in Fermo.

== Brothers ==
Lodovico Graziani's three brothers, who became professional singers, were: Giuseppe (1819–1905), a bass; Francesco (1828–1901), a baritone; and Vincenzo (1836–1906), also a baritone. (For more details about his brothers, see Francesco Graziani.)
