= Francesco Marconi =

Italian opera singer (died 1916)

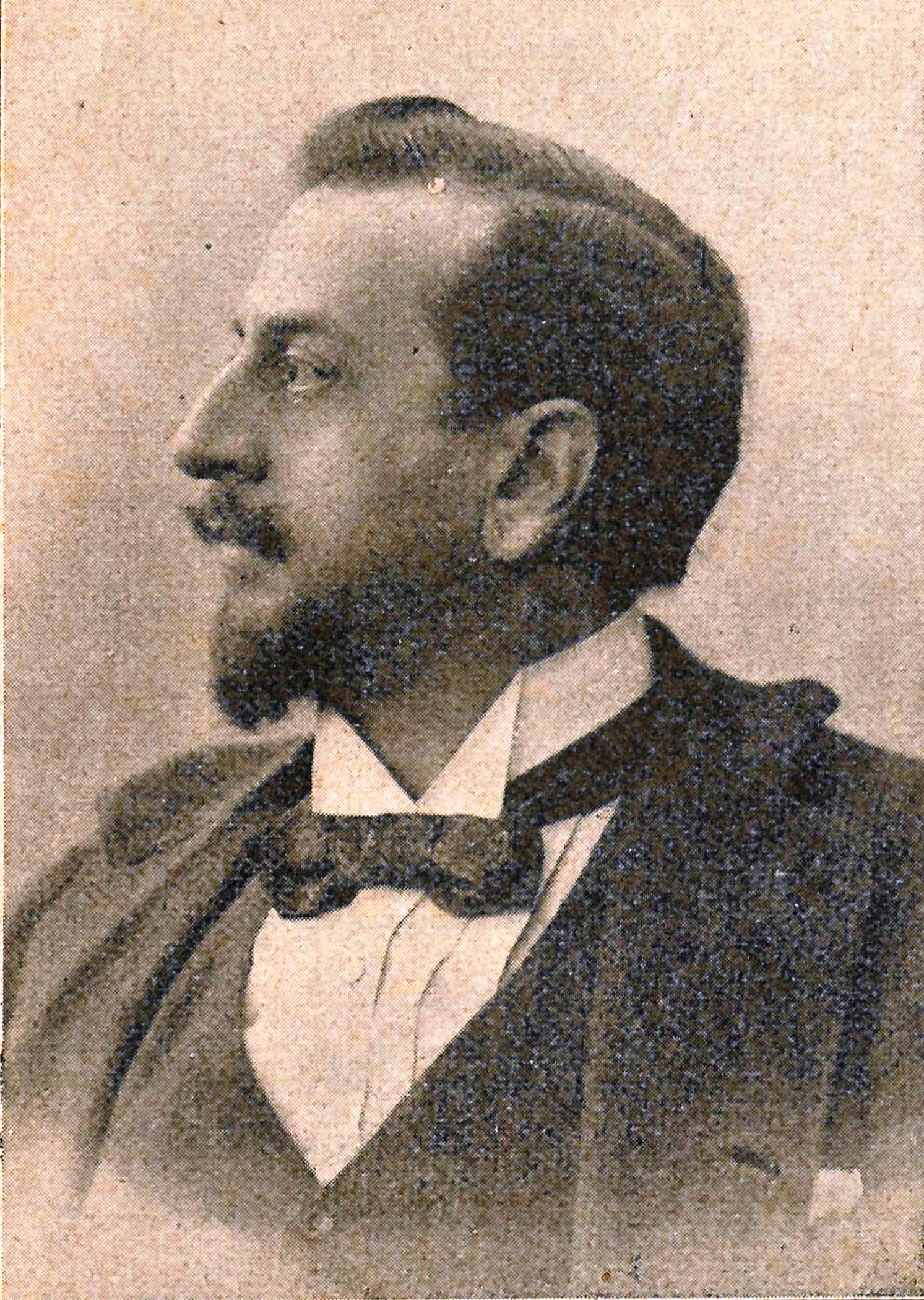

Francesco Marconi (14 May 1853 [or 1855] – 5 February 1916) was an operatic tenor from Rome who enjoyed an important international career. In 1924, a reputable biographical dictionary of musicians called him 'one of the most renowned and esteemed singers of the last 50 years'. Along with his great contemporary Francesco Tamagno (1850–1905), he is the earliest Italian tenor to have left a representative legacy of acoustic recordings.

== Life & singing career ==
Born of humble origins in Rome, "Cecco" Marconi worked as a carpenter during his youth. The promising quality of his voice came to the attention of a singing teacher, Augusto Macciò, who began his lessons in vocalizing. Later, he studied with a more prominent pedagogue, Ottavio Bartolini, a baritone of the previous generation and teacher of dramatic tenor Francesco Signorini and bass Paolo Wulman—and who later would discover baritone Giuseppe De Luca at age thirteen and encourage him to study at the Accademia di Santa Cecilia under Venceslao Persichini.

Marconi made his operatic debut in the Spanish capital of Madrid in 1878 at the Teatro Real, singing the title role in Faust by Charles Gounod. His debut was a success, and he was soon appearing regularly at Italy's premier opera house, La Scala, Milan, with lucrative summer seasons spent performing in South America, mainly at Buenos Aires. He also sang with distinction at the Royal Opera House, Covent Garden, London, for two seasons: 1883 and 1884.

He was engaged to perform the United States, and in New York City in 1888, he appeared as the protagonist in the first American performances of Giuseppe Verdi's Otello. He failed, however, to achieve a real success on this particular occasion because his lyric voice was not equal to the heavyweight dramatic demands of Otello's score, which had been written by Verdi to suit the more powerful tones of his stentorian rival Tamagno.

Thereafter, Marconi built his operatic career increasingly in Eastern Europe, singing often in Poland and Russia to considerable acclaim during the 1890s. While in Russia, he appeared at the imperial opera houses situated in Moscow and Saint Petersburg, and added Anton Rubinstein's Nero and Peter Tchaikovsky's Eugene Onegin to his repertoire.

Marconi's repertoire did not consist entirely of operas, however. He also participated in performances of such significant sacred works as Rossini's Stabat mater and the Verdi Requiem. Indeed, near the end of his career, he toured widely in the Requiem, performing as part of a regular quartet of singers which contained one other top-class artist, Francesco Navarini (1855-1923), who was considered to be the best Italian bass of the era.

The operatic parts that Marconi undertook in Europe and the two American continents included the principal tenor roles in the following works:

Lucrezia Borgia, Lucia di Lammermoor La favorita (all composed by Gaetano Donizetti), I Puritani (by Vincenzo Bellini), Un ballo in maschera, Rigoletto, La traviata and Aida (all by Verdi), La Gioconda (by Amilcare Ponchielli), Mefistofele (by Arrigo Boito), Ruy Blas (by Filippo Marchetti), L'Africaine and Les Huguenots (by Giacomo Meyerbeer) and Lohengrin (by Richard Wagner).

Famed during the peak of his career for the silvery beauty of his singing, the ease of his high notes and the spontaneity of his interpretations, Marconi retained all his life a simplicity of character which endeared him to many admirers. He made two sets of recordings, in 1903 (or 1904) and 1907/08, for the Gramophone Company. Some of them, like Marconi's sweet-toned and finely structured version of Cielo e mar from La Gioconda and his stylish delivery of arias from Lucia di Lammermoor, successfully convey the limpidity and grace of his bel canto method of vocalism; but most of them demonstrate that by the age of 50, both his breath control and the sweetly lyrical timbre of his voice had been damaged by the strain of singing such taxing roles as Radames, Otello, Lohengrin and Don Alvaro.

Marconi notably partnered Antonio Cotogni, an illustrious baritone and voice teacher from an earlier generation, in the only record that is known to have been made by Cotogni, the duet "I mulattieri." (Marconi and Cotogni were well known to each other: they had sung together, for instance, in London in the early 1880s, appearing in the same production of La Gioconda.) In 1990, the English firm Symposium Records issued a compact disc containing 22 of Marconi's recordings, including the duet with Cotogni. (The CD catalogue number of this Marconi collection is 1069; five more Marconi tracks are included on a later Symposium release, number 1073.)

== Discography ==
Marconi's recordings were made for the Gramophone Company's Italian Catalogue, as follows:

- 52016 Dai campi, dai prati, Mefistofele (Boito), with piano. (10", 1903/04)
- 52017 Stanze, Nerone (Rubinstein), with piano. (10", 1903/04)
- 52788 Questa o quella, Rigoletto (Verdi), with piano. (10", 1903/04)
- 052054 Romanza del duello, Eugene Onegin (Tchaikovsky), with piano. (12", 1903/04)
- 052055 O Paradiso! L'Africaine (Meyerbeer), with piano. (12", 1903/04)
- 052056 Cielo e mar! La Gioconda (Ponchielli), with piano. (12", 1903/04)
- 052057 Ingemisco tamquam reus, Requiem (Verdi), with piano. (12", 1903/04)
- 052058 Bella cantiam l'amore (Mascagni), with piano. (12", 1903/04)
- 052065 Non guardarmi così (Paloni), with piano. (12", 1903/04)
- 052200 Di pescatore ignobile, Lucrezia Borgia (Donizetti), with piano. (12", 1903/04: re-pressed on VB 27)
- 2-52631 Invan, invan, Nerone (Rubinstein), with piano. (10", 1908)
- 2-52632 Questa o quella, Rigoletto (Verdi), with piano. (10", 1908)
- 2-52662 Ed ei non, Ruy Blas (Marchetti). (10", 1908)
- 2-52663 Una vergine, un angiol di Dio, La favorita (Donizetti). (10", 1908)
- 2-52672 Dai campi, dai prati, Mefistofele (Boito). (10", 1908)
- 2-52673 In questa sera (Denza). (10", 1908)
- 54373 (with Antonio Cotogni, baritone) Duetto, I Mulattieri (Masini), with piano. (10", 1908)
- 052221 Fra poco a me ricovero, Lucia di Lammermoor (Donizetti). (12", 1908)
- 052233 O Paradiso! L'Africaine (Meyerbeer). (12", 1908)
- 052234 Tu che a Dio spiegasti l'ali, Lucia di Lammermoor (Donizetti). (12", 1908)
- 054186 (with Bice Mililotti, soprano) Madrigale a due voci, Roméo et Juliette (Gounod). (12", 1908)
- 054187 (with Bice Mililotti, soprano) O mia Mimosa, The Geisha (Jones). (12", 1908)
- 054188 (with Bice Mililotti, soprano) Duetto della rosa, Martha (Flotow). (12", 1908)
- 054189 (with Bice Mililotti, soprano) Sento una forza indomita, Il Guarany (Gomes). (12", 1908)
- 054190 (with Bice Mililotti, soprano) Madre se ognor lontano, Lucrezia Borgia (Donizetti). (12", 1908)
- 054208 (with Maria Galvany, soprano) Vieni fra queste, I puritani (Donizetti). (12", 1908: re-pressed on His Master's Voice DB 481 and VB 4)
- 054214 (with Nestore Della Torre, baritone) Solenne in quest'ora, La forza del destino (Verdi). (12", 1908)

== Literature ==
- Barini, Giorgio, 'In morte di Francesco Marconi', La Nuova Antologia Review (Rome 1916).
