= Baritone =

Type of classical male vocal range

A baritone is a type of classical male singing voice whose vocal range lies between the bass and the tenor voice types. It is the most common human male voice. The term originates from the Greek βαρύτονος (barýtonos), meaning "low sounding". Composers typically write music for this voice in the range from the second F below middle C to the F above middle C (i.e. F_{2}–F_{4}) in choral music, and from the second G below middle C to the G above middle C (G_{2} to G_{4}) in operatic music, but the range can extend at either end. Subtypes of baritone include the baryton-Martin baritone (light baritone), lyric baritone, Kavalierbariton, Verdi baritone, dramatic baritone, baryton-noble baritone, and the bass-baritone.

== History ==
The first use of the term "baritone" emerged as baritonans, late in the 15th century, usually in French sacred polyphonic music. At this early stage it was frequently used as the lowest of the voices (including the bass), but in 17th-century Italy the term was all-encompassing and used to describe the average male choral voice.

Baritones took roughly the range as it is known today at the beginning of the 18th century, but they were still lumped in with their bass colleagues until well into the 19th century. Many operatic works of the 18th century have roles marked as bass that in reality are low baritone roles (or bass-baritone parts in modern parlance). Examples of this are to be found, for instance, in the operas and oratorios of George Frideric Handel. The greatest and most enduring parts for baritones in 18th-century operatic music were composed by Wolfgang Amadeus Mozart. They include Count Almaviva in The Marriage of Figaro, Guglielmo in Così fan tutte, Papageno in The Magic Flute and Don Giovanni.

=== 19th century ===
In theatrical documents, cast lists, and journalistic dispatches that from the beginning of the 19th century till the mid-1820s, the terms primo basso, basse chantante, and basse-taille were often used for men who would later be called baritones. These included the likes of Filippo Galli, Giovanni Inchindi, and Henri-Bernard Dabadie. The basse-taille and the proper bass were commonly confused because their roles were sometimes sung by singers of either actual voice part.

The bel canto style of vocalism which arose in Italy in the early 19th century supplanted the castrato-dominated opera seria of the previous century. It led to the baritone being viewed as a separate voice category from the bass. Traditionally, basses in operas had been cast as authority figures such as a king or high priest; but with the advent of the more fluid baritone voice, the roles allotted by composers to lower male voices expanded in the direction of trusted companions or even romantic leads—normally the province of tenors. More often than not, however, baritones found themselves portraying villains.

The principal composers of bel canto opera are considered to be:

- Gioachino Rossini (The Barber of Seville, William Tell);
- Gaetano Donizetti (Don Pasquale, L'elisir d'amore, Lucia di Lammermoor, Lucrezia Borgia, La favorite);
- Vincenzo Bellini (I puritani, Norma);
- Giacomo Meyerbeer (Les Huguenots); and
- the young Giuseppe Verdi (Nabucco, Ernani, Macbeth, Rigoletto, La traviata, Il trovatore).

The prolific operas of these composers, plus the works of Verdi's maturity, such as Un ballo in maschera, La forza del destino, Don Carlos/Don Carlo, the revised Simon Boccanegra, Aida, Otello and Falstaff, blazed many new and rewarding performance pathways for baritones. Figaro in Il barbiere is often called the first true baritone role. However, Donizetti and Verdi in their vocal writing went on to emphasize the top fifth of the baritone voice, rather than its lower notes—thus generating a more brilliant sound. Further pathways opened up when the musically complex and physically demanding operas of Richard Wagner began to enter the mainstream repertory of the world's opera houses during the second half of the 19th century.

The major international baritone of the first half of the 19th century was the Italian Antonio Tamburini (1800–1876). He was a famous Don Giovanni in Mozart's eponymous opera as well as being a Bellini and Donizetti specialist. Commentators praised his voice for its beauty, flexibility and smooth tonal emission, which are the hallmarks of a bel canto singer. Tamburini's range, however, was probably closer to that of a bass-baritone than to that of a modern "Verdi baritone". His French equivalent was Henri-Bernard Dabadie, who was a mainstay of the Paris Opera between 1819 and 1836 and the creator of several major Rossinian baritone roles, including Guillaume Tell. Dabadie sang in Italy, too, where he originated the role of Belcore in L'elisir d'amore in 1832.

The most important of Tamburini's Italianate successors were all Verdians. They included:

- Giorgio Ronconi, who created the title role in Verdi's Nabucco
- Felice Varesi, who created the title roles in Macbeth and Rigoletto as well as Germont in La traviata
- Antonio Superchi, the originator of Don Carlo in Ernani
- Francesco Graziani, who was the original Don Carlo di Vargas in La forza del destino
- Leone Giraldoni, the creator of Renato in Un ballo in maschera and the first Simon Boccanegra
- Enrico Delle Sedie, who was London's first Renato
- Francesco Pandolfini, whose singing at La Scala during the 1870s was praised by Verdi
- Antonio Cotogni, a much lauded singer in Milan, London and Saint Petersburg, the first Italian Posa in Don Carlos and later a great vocal pedagogue, too
- Filippo Coletti, creator of Verdi's Gusmano in Alzira, Francesco in I masnadieri, Germont in the second version of La traviata and for whom Verdi considered writing the (unrealized) opera Lear
- Giuseppe Del Puente, who sang Verdi to acclaim in the United States

Among the non-Italian born baritones that were active in the third quarter of the 19th century, Tamburini's mantle as an outstanding exponent of Mozart and Donizetti's music was probably taken up most faithfully by a Belgian, Camille Everardi, who later settled in Russia and taught voice. In France, Paul Barroilhet succeeded Dabadie as the Paris opera's best known baritone. Like Dabadie, he also sang in Italy and created an important Donizetti role: in his case, Alphonse in La favorite (in 1840).

Luckily, the gramophone was invented early enough to capture on disc the voices of the top Italian Verdi and Donizetti baritones of the last two decades of the 19th century, whose operatic performances were characterized by considerable re-creative freedom and a high degree of technical finish. They included Mattia Battistini (known as the "King of Baritones"), Giuseppe Kaschmann (born Josip Kašman) who, atypically, sang Wagner's Telramund and Amfortas not in Italian but in German, at the Bayreuth Festival in the 1890s; Giuseppe Campanari; Antonio Magini-Coletti; Mario Ancona (chosen to be the first Silvio in Pagliacci); and Antonio Scotti, who came to the Met from Europe in 1899 and remained on the roster of singers until 1933. Antonio Pini-Corsi was the standout Italian buffo baritone in the period between about 1880 and World War I, reveling in comic opera roles by Rossini, Donizetti and Paer, among others. In 1893, he created the part of Ford in Verdi's last opera, Falstaff.

Notable among their contemporaries were the cultured and technically adroit French baritones Jean Lassalle (hailed as the most accomplished baritone of his generation), Victor Maurel (the creator of Verdi's Iago, Falstaff and Tonio in Leoncavallo's Pagliacci), Paul Lhérie (the first Posa in the revised, Italian-language version of Don Carlos), and Maurice Renaud (a singing actor of the first magnitude). Lassalle, Maurel and Renaud enjoyed superlative careers on either side of the Atlantic and left a valuable legacy of recordings. Five other significant Francophone baritones who recorded, too, during the early days of the gramophone/phonograph were Léon Melchissédec and Jean Noté of the Paris Opera and Gabriel Soulacroix, Henry Albers and Charles Gilibert of the Opéra-Comique. The Quaker baritone David Bispham, who sang in London and New York between 1891 and 1903, was the leading American male singer of this generation. He also recorded for the gramophone.

The oldest-born star baritone known for sure to have made solo gramophone discs was the Englishman Sir Charles Santley (1834–1922). Santley made his operatic debut in Italy in 1858 and became one of Covent Garden's leading singers. He was still giving critically acclaimed concerts in London in the 1890s. The composer of Faust, Charles Gounod, wrote Valentine's aria "Even bravest heart" for him at his request for the London production in 1864 so that the leading baritone would have an aria. A couple of primitive cylinder recordings dating from about 1900 have been attributed by collectors to the dominant French baritone of the 1860s and 1870s, Jean-Baptiste Faure (1830–1914), the creator of Posa in Verdi's original French-language version of Don Carlos. It is doubtful, however, that Faure (who retired in 1886) made the cylinders. However, a contemporary of Faure's, Antonio Cotogni, (1831–1918)—probably the foremost Italian baritone of his generation—can be heard, briefly and dimly, at the age of 77, on a duet recording with the tenor Francesco Marconi. (Cotogni and Marconi had sung together in the first London performance of Amilcare Ponchielli's La Gioconda in 1883, performing the roles of Barnaba and Enzo respectively.)

== Subtypes ==
There are 19th-century references in the musical literature to certain baritone subtypes. These include the light and tenorish baryton-Martin, named after French singer Jean-Blaise Martin (1768/69–1837), and the deeper, more powerful Heldenbariton (today's bass-baritone) of Wagnerian opera.

Perhaps the most accomplished Heldenbaritons of Wagner's day were August Kindermann, Franz Betz and Theodor Reichmann. Betz created Hans Sachs in Die Meistersinger and undertook Wotan in the first Der Ring des Nibelungen cycle at Bayreuth, while Reichmann created Amfortas in Parsifal, also at Bayreuth. Lyric German baritones sang lighter Wagnerian roles such as Wolfram in Tannhäuser, Kurwenal in Tristan und Isolde or Telramund in Lohengrin. They made large strides, too, in the performance of art song and oratorio, with Franz Schubert favouring several baritones for his vocal music, in particular Johann Michael Vogl.

Nineteenth-century operettas became the preserve of lightweight baritone voices. They were given comic parts by Gilbert and Sullivan in many of their productions, in the tradition of the previous century's comic bass. This did not prevent the French master of operetta, Jacques Offenbach, from assigning the villain's role in The Tales of Hoffmann to a big-voiced baritone for the sake of dramatic effect. Other 19th-century French composers like Meyerbeer, Hector Berlioz, Camille Saint-Saëns, Georges Bizet and Jules Massenet wrote attractive parts for baritones, too. These included Nelusko in L'Africaine (Meyerbeer's last opera), Mephistopheles in La Damnation de Faust (a role also sung by basses), the Priest of Dagon in Samson and Delilah, Escamillo in Carmen, Zurga in Les pêcheurs de perles, Lescaut in Manon, Athanael in Thaïs and Herod in Hérodiade. Russian composers included substantial baritone parts in their operas. Witness the title roles in Peter Tchaikovsky's Eugene Onegin (which received its first production in 1879) and Alexander Borodin's Prince Igor (1890).

Mozart continued to be sung throughout the 19th century although, generally speaking, his operas were not revered to the same extent that they are today by music critics and audiences. Back then, baritones rather than high basses normally sang Don Giovanni – arguably Mozart's greatest male operatic creation. Famous Dons of the late 19th and early 20th centuries included Scotti and Maurel, as well as Portugal's Francisco D'Andrade and Sweden's John Forsell.

The verismo baritone, Verdi baritone, and other subtypes are mentioned below, though not necessarily in 19th-century context.

=== 20th century ===
The dawn of the 20th century opened up more opportunities for baritones than ever before as a taste for strenuously exciting vocalism and lurid, "slice-of-life" operatic plots took hold in Italy and spread elsewhere. The most prominent verismo baritones included such major singers in Europe and America as the polished Giuseppe De Luca (the first Sharpless in Madama Butterfly), Mario Sammarco (the first Gerard in Andrea Chénier), Eugenio Giraldoni (the first Scarpia in Tosca), Pasquale Amato (the first Rance in La fanciulla del West), Riccardo Stracciari (noted for his richly attractive timbre) and Domenico Viglione Borghese, whose voice was exceeded in size only by that of the lion-voiced Titta Ruffo. Ruffo was the most commanding Italian baritone of his era or, arguably, any other era. He was at his prime from the early 1900s to the early 1920s and enjoyed success in Italy, England and America (in Chicago and later at the Met).

The chief verismo composers were Giacomo Puccini, Ruggero Leoncavallo, Pietro Mascagni, Alberto Franchetti, Umberto Giordano and Francesco Cilea. Verdi's works continued to remain popular, however, with audiences in Italy, the Spanish-speaking countries, the United States and the United Kingdom, and in Germany, where there was a major Verdi revival in Berlin between the wars.

Outside the field of Italian opera, an important addition to the Austro-German repertory occurred in 1905. This was the premiere of Richard Strauss's Salome, with the pivotal part of John the Baptist assigned to a baritone. (The enormous-voiced Dutch baritone Anton van Rooy, a Wagner specialist, sang John when the opera reached the Met in 1907). Then, in 1925, Germany's Leo Schützendorf created the title baritone role in Alban Berg's harrowing Wozzeck. In a separate development, the French composer Claude Debussy's post-Wagnerian masterpiece Pelléas et Mélisande featured not one but two lead baritones at its 1902 premiere. These two baritones, Jean Périer and Hector Dufranne, possessed contrasting voices. (Dufranne – sometimes classed as a bass-baritone – had a darker, more powerful instrument than did Périer, who was a true baryton-Martin.)

Characteristic of the Wagnerian baritones of the 20th century was a general progression of individual singers from higher-lying baritone parts to lower-pitched ones. This was the case with Germany's Hans Hotter. Hotter made his debut in 1929. As a young singer he appeared in Verdi and created the Commandant in Richard Strauss's Friedenstag and Olivier in Capriccio. By the 1950s, however, he was being hailed as the top Wagnerian bass-baritone in the world. His Wotan was especially praised by critics for its musicianship. Other major Wagnerian baritones have included Hotter's predecessors Leopold Demuth, Anton van Rooy, Hermann Weil, Clarence Whitehill, Friedrich Schorr, Rudolf Bockelmann and Hans-Hermann Nissen. Demuth, van Rooy, Weil and Whitehill were at their peak in the late 19th and early 20th centuries while Schorr, Bockelmann and Nissen were stars of the 1920s and 1930s.

In addition to their heavyweight Wagnerian cousins, there was a plethora of baritones with more lyrical voices active in Germany and Austria during the period between the outbreak of WW1 in 1914 and the end of WW2 in 1945. Among them were Joseph Schwarz, Heinrich Schlusnus, Herbert Janssen, Willi Domgraf-Fassbaender, Karl Schmitt-Walter and Gerhard Hüsch. Their abundant inter-war Italian counterparts included, among others, Carlo Galeffi, Giuseppe Danise, Enrico Molinari, Umberto Urbano, Cesare Formichi, Luigi Montesanto, Apollo Granforte, Benvenuto Franci, Renato Zanelli (who switched to tenor roles in 1924), Mario Basiola, Giovanni Inghilleri, Carlo Morelli (the Chilean-born younger brother of Renato Zanelli) and Carlo Tagliabue, who retired as late as 1958.

One of the best known Italian Verdi baritones of the 1920s and 1930s, Mariano Stabile, sang Iago and Rigoletto and Falstaff (at La Scala) under the baton of Arturo Toscanini. Stabile also appeared in London, Chicago and Salzburg. He was noted more for his histrionic skills than for his voice, however. Stabile was followed by Tito Gobbi, a versatile singing actor capable of vivid comic and tragic performances during the years of his prime in the 1940s, 1950s and early 1960s. He learned more than 100 roles in his lifetime and was mostly known for his roles in Verdi and Puccini operas, including appearances as Scarpia opposite soprano Maria Callas as Tosca at Covent Garden.

Gobbi's competitors included Gino Bechi, Giuseppe Valdengo, Paolo Silveri, Giuseppe Taddei, Ettore Bastianini, Cesare Bardelli and Giangiacomo Guelfi. Another of Gobbi's contemporaries was the Welshman Geraint Evans, who famously sang Falstaff at Glyndebourne and created the roles of Mr. Flint and Mountjoy in works by Benjamin Britten. Some considered his best role to have been Wozzeck. The next significant Welsh baritone was Bryn Terfel. He made his premiere at Glyndebourne in 1990 and went on to build an international career as Falstaff and, more generally, in the operas of Mozart and Wagner.

Perhaps the first famous American baritone appeared in the 1900s. It was the American-born but Paris-based Charles W. Clark who sang Italian, French and German composers. An outstanding group of virile-voiced American baritones appeared then in the 1920s. The younger members of this group were still active as recently as the late 1970s. Outstanding among its members were the Met-based Verdians Lawrence Tibbett (a compelling, rich-voiced singing actor), Richard Bonelli, John Charles Thomas, Robert Weede, Leonard Warren and Robert Merrill. They sang French opera, too, as did the American-born but also Paris-based baritone of the 1920s, and 1930s Arthur Endreze.

Also to be found singing Verdi roles at the Met, Covent Garden and the Vienna Opera during the late 1930s and the 1940s was the big-voiced Hungarian baritone, Sandor (Alexander) Sved.

The leading Verdi baritones of the 1970s and 1980s were probably Italy's Renato Bruson and Piero Cappuccilli, America's Sherrill Milnes, Sweden's Ingvar Wixell and the Romanian baritone Nicolae Herlea. At the same time, Britain's Sir Thomas Allen was considered to be the most versatile baritone of his generation in regards to repertoire, which ranged from Mozart to Verdi and lighter Wagner roles, through French and Russian opera, to modern English music. Another British baritone, Norman Bailey, established himself internationally as a memorable Wotan and Hans Sachs. However, he had a distinguished, brighter-voiced Wagnerian rival during the 1960s, 70s, and 80s in the person of Thomas Stewart of America. Other notable post-War Wagnerian baritones have been Canada's George London, Germany's Hermann Uhde and, more recently, America's James Morris.

Among the late-20th-century baritones noted throughout the opera world for their Verdi performances was Vladimir Chernov, who emerged from the former USSR to sing at the Met. Chernov followed in the footsteps of such richly endowed East European baritones as Ippolit Pryanishnikov (a favorite of Tchaikovski's), Joachim Tartakov (an Everardi pupil), Oskar Kamionsky (an exceptional bel canto singer nicknamed the "Russian Battistini"), Waclaw Brzezinski (known as the "Polish Battistini"), Georges Baklanoff (a powerful singing actor), and, during a career lasting from 1935 to 1966, the Bolshoi's Pavel Lisitsian. Dmitri Hvorostovsky and Sergei Leiferkus are two Russian baritones of the modern era who appear regularly in the West. Like Lisitsian, they sing Verdi and the works of their native composers, including Tchaikovsky's Eugene Onegin and The Queen of Spades.

In the realm of French song, the bass-baritone José van Dam and the lighter-voiced Gérard Souzay have been notable. Souzay's repertoire extended from the Baroque works of Jean-Baptiste Lully to 20th-century composers such as Francis Poulenc. Pierre Bernac, Souzay's teacher, was an interpreter of Poulenc's songs in the previous generation. Older baritones identified with this style include France's Dinh Gilly and Charles Panzéra and Australia's John Brownlee. Another Australian, Peter Dawson, made a small but precious legacy of benchmark Handel recordings during the 1920s and 1930s. (Dawson, incidentally, acquired his outstanding Handelian technique from Sir Charles Santley.) Yet another Australian baritone of distinction between the wars was Harold Williams, who was based in the United Kingdom. Important British-born baritones of the 1930s and 1940s were Dennis Noble, who sang Italian and English operatic roles, and the Mozartian Roy Henderson. Both appeared often at Covent Garden.

Prior to World War II, Germany's Heinrich Schlusnus, Gerhard Hüsch and Herbert Janssen were celebrated for their beautifully sung lieder recitals as well as for their mellifluous operatic performances in Verdi, Mozart, and Wagner respectively. After the war's conclusion, Hermann Prey and Dietrich Fischer-Dieskau appeared on the scene to take their place. In addition to his interpretations of lieder and the works of Mozart, Prey sang in Strauss operas and tackled lighter Wagner roles such as Wolfram or Beckmesser. Fischer-Dieskau sang parts in 'fringe' operas by the likes of Ferruccio Busoni and Paul Hindemith as well as appearing in standard works by Verdi and Wagner. He earned his principal renown, however, as a lieder singer. Talented German and Austrian lieder singers of a younger generation include Olaf Bär, Matthias Goerne, Wolfgang Holzmair and Johannes Sterkel (which are also performing or have performed regularly in opera), Thomas Quasthoff, Stephan Genz and Christian Gerhaher. Well-known non-Germanic baritones of recent times have included the Italians Giorgio Zancanaro and Leo Nucci, the Frenchman François le Roux, the Canadians Gerald Finley and James Westman and the versatile American Thomas Hampson, his compatriot Nathan Gunn and the Englishman Simon Keenlyside.

== Vocal range ==
Baritone vocal range (G_{2}–G_{4}) notated on the bass staff (left), and (A_{2}–A_{4}) on the piano keyboard in green with middle C (C_{4}) shown by a black dot

The vocal range of the baritone lies between the bass and the tenor voice types. The baritone vocal range is usually between the second G below middle C (G_{2}) and the G above middle C (G_{4}). Composers typically write music for this voice in the range from the second F below middle C to the F above middle C (i.e. F_{2}–F_{4}) in choral music, and from the second A below middle C to the A above middle C (A_{2} to A_{4}) in operatic music.

== Subtypes and roles in opera ==
Within the baritone voice type category are seven generally recognized subcategories: baryton-Martin baritone (light baritone); lyric baritone; Kavalierbariton; Verdi baritone; dramatic baritone; baryton-noble baritone; and the bass-baritone.

=== Baryton-Martin ===
The baryton-Martin baritone (sometimes referred to as light baritone) lacks the lower G_{2}–B_{2} range a heavier baritone is capable of, and has a lighter, almost tenor-like quality. Its common range is from C_{3} to the B above middle C (C_{3} to B_{4}). Generally seen only in French repertoire, this Fach was named after the French singer Jean-Blaise Martin. Associated with the rise of the baritone in the 19th century, Martin was well known for his fondness for falsetto singing, and the designation 'baryton Martin' has been used (Faure, 1886) to separate his voice from the 'Verdi Baritone', which carried the chest register further into the upper range. This voice type shares the primo passaggio and secondo passaggio with the Dramatic Tenor and Heldentenor (C_{4} and F_{4} respectively), and hence could be trained as a tenor.

Baryton-Martin roles in opera:

- Aeneas, Dido and Aeneas (Purcell)
- Dancaïre, Carmen (Bizet)
- L'horloge comtoise, L'enfant et les sortilèges (Ravel)
- Orfeo, L'Orfeo (Monteverdi)
- Pelléas, Pelléas et Mélisande (Debussy)
- Ramiro, L'heure espagnole (Ravel)

=== Lyric ===
The lyric baritone is a sweeter, milder sounding baritone voice, lacking in harshness; lighter and perhaps mellower than the dramatic baritone with a higher tessitura. Its common range is from the A below C_{3} to the A♭ above middle C (A_{2} to A♭_{4}). It is typically assigned to comic roles.

Lyric baritone roles in opera:

- Count Almaviva, The Marriage of Figaro (Mozart)
- Guglielmo, Così fan tutte (Mozart)
- Papageno, The Magic Flute (Mozart)
- Dr Malatesta, Don Pasquale (Donizetti)
- Prospero, The Tempest (Adès)
- Marcello, La bohème (Puccini)
- Figaro, The Barber of Seville (Rossini)
- Morales, Carmen (Bizet)
- Top, The Tender Land (Copland)

=== Kavalierbariton ===
Riccardo Stracciari singing Giorgio Germont's aria Di provenza il mar il suol from La traviata

The Kavalierbariton baritone is a metallic voice that can sing both lyric and dramatic phrases, a manly, noble baritonal color. Its common range is from the A below low C to the G above middle C (A_{2} to G_{4}). Not quite as powerful as the Verdi baritone who is expected to have a powerful appearance on stage, perhaps muscular or physically large.

Kavalierbariton roles in opera:

- Don Giovanni, Don Giovanni (Mozart)
- Count, Capriccio (R. Strauss)
- Giorgio Germont, La traviata (Verdi)
- Zurga, Les pêcheurs de perles (Bizet)

=== Verdi ===
The Verdi baritone is a more specialized voice category and a subset of the Dramatic Baritone. Its common range is from the G below low C to the B♭ above middle C (G_{2} to B♭_{4}). A Verdi baritone refers to a voice capable of singing consistently and with ease in the highest part of the baritone range. It will generally have a lot of squillo. Verdi baritone roles in opera:

- Amonasro, Aida
- Conte di Luna, Il trovatore
- Don Carlo, Ernani
- Don Carlo di Vargas, La forza del destino
- Falstaff, Falstaff
- Ford, Falstaff
- Germont, La traviata
- Iago, Otello
- Macbeth, Macbeth
- Nabucco, Nabucco
- Renato, Un ballo in maschera
- Rigoletto, Rigoletto
- Rodrigo, Don Carlos
- Simon Boccanegra, Simon Boccanegra

=== Dramatic ===
The dramatic baritone is a voice that is richer, fuller, and sometimes harsher than a lyric baritone and with a darker quality. Its common range is from the G half an octave below low C to the G above middle C (G_{2} to G_{4}). The dramatic baritone category corresponds roughly to the Heldenbariton in the German Fach system except that some Verdi baritone roles are not included. The primo passaggio and secondo passaggio of both the Verdi and dramatic baritone are at B♭ and E♭ respectively, hence the differentiation is based more heavily on timbre and tessitura. Accordingly, roles that fall into this category tend to have a slightly lower tessitura than typical Verdi baritone roles, only rising above an F at the moments of greatest intensity. Many of the Puccini roles fall into this category. However, a Verdi Baritone is simply a Dramatic Baritone with greater ease in the upper tessitura (Verdi Baritone roles center approximately a minor third higher). Because the Verdi Baritone is sometimes seen as a subset of the Dramatic Baritone, some singers perform roles from both sets of repertoire. Similarly, the lower tessitura of these roles allows them frequently to be sung by bass-baritones.

Dramatic baritone roles in opera:

- Jack Rance, La fanciulla del West (Puccini)
- Scarpia, Tosca (Puccini)
- Iago, Otello (Verdi)
- Escamillo, Carmen (Bizet)

=== Baryton-noble ===
The baryton-noble baritone is French for "noble baritone" and describes a part that requires a noble bearing, smooth vocalisation and forceful declamation, all in perfect balance. This category originated in the Paris Opera, but it greatly influenced Verdi (Don Carlo in Ernani and Don Carlo di Vargas in La forza del destino; Count di Luna in Il trovatore; Simon Boccanegra) and Wagner as well (Wotan; Amfortas). Similar to the Kavalierbariton.

Baryton-noble roles in opera are:

- Aleko, Aleko
- Alberich, Siegfried
- Albert, Werther
- Alfio, Cavalleria rusticana
- Amfortas, Parsifal
- Amonasro, Aida
- Ascanio Petrucci, Lucrezia Borgia
- Athanaël, Thaïs
- Barnaba, La Gioconda
- Baron Mirko Zeta, The Merry Widow
- Belcore, L'elisir d'amore
- Boris Godunov, Boris Godunov
- Chou En-lai, Nixon in China
- Chorèbe, Les Troyens
- Count di Luna, Il trovatore
- Count Monterone, Rigoletto
- Count Tomsky, The Queen of Spades
- Count von Eberbach, Der Wildschütz
- Dandini, La Cenerentola
- Don Carlo, Ernani
- Don Carlo di Vargas, La forza del destino
- Don Giovanni, Don Giovanni
- Dr. Malatesta, Don Pasquale
- Dr. P., The Man Who Mistook His Wife for a Hat
- Duke of Nottingham, Roberto Devereux
- Dunois, The Maid of Orleans
- Eddie Carbone, A View from the Bridge
- Eochaidh, The Immortal Hour
- Enrico Ashton, Lucia di Lammermoor
- Ernesto, Il pirata
- Escamillo, Carmen
- Eugene Onegin, Eugene Onegin
- Falstaff, Falstaff
- Figaro, The Barber of Seville
- Ford, Falstaff
- Ford, The Merry Wives of Windsor
- Francisco Goya, Facing Goya
- Friedrich of Telramund, Lohengrin
- Fyodor Poyarok, The Legend of the Invisible City of Kitezh and the Maiden Fevroniya
- Gérard, Andrea Chénier
- Giorgio Germont, La traviata
- Golaud, Pelléas et Mélisande
- Guglielmo, Così fan tutte
- Guglielmo Tell, William Tell
- Hamlet, Hamlet
- Hans Heiling, Hans Heiling
- Herr von Faninal, Der Rosenkavalier
- High Priest of Dagon, Samson and Delilah
- Horace Tabor, The Ballad of Baby Doe
- Iago, Otello
- Igor Svyatoslavich, Prince Igor
- Ivan Mazepa, Mazeppa
- Jack Rance, La fanciulla del West
- Jochanaan, Salome
- John Styx, Orpheus in the Underworld
- Jupiter, Orpheus in the Underworld
- Kilian, Der Freischütz
- Kochubey, Mazeppa
- Krušina, The Bartered Bride
- Kurwenal, Tristan und Isolde
- Le Comte de Nevers, Les Huguenots
- Le Comte de Saint-Bris, Les Huguenots
- Lescaut, Manon Lescaut
- Lescaut, Manon
- Lionel, The Maid of Orleans
- Lord Cockburn, Fra Diavolo
- Lord Guglielmo Cecil, Maria Stuarda
- Marcello, La bohème
- Marullo, Rigoletto
- Mercutio, Roméo et Juliette
- Nabucco, Nabucco
- Ottokar, Der Freischütz
- Paolo Albiani, Simon Boccanegra
- Papageno, The Magic Flute
- Peter, Hänsel und Gretel
- Prince Afron, The Golden Cockerel
- Prince Vyazminsky, The Oprichnik
- Prince Yeletsky, The Queen of Spades
- Prince Nikita Kurlyatev, The Enchantress
- Prosdocimo, Il turco in Italia
- Raimbaud, Le comte Ory
- Richard Nixon, Nixon in China
- Ruggiero, La Juive
- Rigoletto, Rigoletto
- Rodrigue, Don Carlos
- Scarpia, Tosca
- Schaunard, La bohème
- Sharpless, Madama Butterfly
- Sherasmin, Oberon
- Simon, Simon Boccanegra
- Sir Riccardo Forth, I puritani
- Tonio, Pagliacci
- Tutor, Le comte Ory
- Valentin, Faust
- Wolfram von Eschenbach, Tannhäuser
- Wozzeck, Wozzeck
- Zurga, Les pêcheurs de perles

=== Bass-baritone ===
Renato Capecchi singing Non più andrai from Le nozze di Figaro

The bass-baritone range extends from the F below low C to the F or F♯ above middle C (F_{2} to F_{4} or F♯_{4}). Bass-baritones are typically divided into two separate categories: lyric bass-baritone and dramatic bass-baritone.

Lyric bass-baritone roles in opera include:

- Don Pizarro, Fidelio (Beethoven)
- Golaud, Pelléas et Mélisande (Debussy)
- Méphistophélès, Faust (Gounod)
- Don Alfonso, Così fan tutte (Mozart)
- Figaro, The Marriage of Figaro (Mozart)
- Leporello, Don Giovanni (Mozart)

Dramatic bass-baritone roles in opera include:

- Aleko, Aleko (Rachmaninoff)
- Igor, Prince Igor (Borodin)
- Dutchman, The Flying Dutchman (Wagner)
- Hans Sachs, Die Meistersinger von Nürnberg (Wagner)
- Wotan, Der Ring des Nibelungen (Wagner)
- Amfortas, Parsifal (Wagner)

=== Gilbert and Sullivan ===
All of Gilbert and Sullivan's Savoy operas have at least one lead baritone character (frequently the comic principal). Notable operetta roles are:

- Archibald Grosvenor, Patience
- Bill Bobstay (Boatswain's Mate), H.M.S. Pinafore
- Captain Corcoran, H.M.S. Pinafore
- Dr. Daly, The Sorcerer
- The Duke of Plaza-Toro, The Gondoliers
- Florian, Princess Ida
- Giuseppe Palmieri, The Gondoliers
- Jack Point, The Yeomen of the Guard
- John Wellington Wells, The Sorcerer
- King Gama, Princess Ida
- Ko-Ko, The Mikado
- Lord Mountararat, Iolanthe
- The Lord Chancellor, Iolanthe
- Luiz, The Gondoliers
- Major-General Stanley, The Pirates of Penzance
- Major Murgatroyd, Patience
- The Pirate King, The Pirates of Penzance
- Pish-Tush, The Mikado
- Pooh-Bah, The Mikado
- Reginald Bunthorne, Patience
- Sir Despard Murgatroyd, Ruddigore
- Sir Joseph Porter, H.M.S. Pinafore
- Sir Richard Cholmondeley (Lieutenant of the Tower), The Yeomen of the Guard
- Sir Ruthven Murgatroyd (as Robin Oakapple), Ruddigore
- Strephon, Iolanthe
- Samuel, The Pirates of Penzance
- Wilfred Shadbolt. The Yeomen of the Guard

=== Baritone in popular music ===
In barbershop music, the baritone part sings in a similar range to the lead (singing the melody) however usually singing lower than the lead. A barbershop baritone has a specific and specialized role in the formation of the four-part harmony that characterizes the style.

The baritone singer is often the one required to support or "fill" the bass sound (typically by singing the fifth above the bass root) and to complete a chord. On the other hand, the baritone will occasionally find himself harmonizing above the melody, which calls for a tenor-like quality. Because the baritone fills the chord, the part is often not very melodic.

In bluegrass music, the melody line is called the lead. Tenor is sung an interval of a third above the lead. Baritone is the fifth of the scale that has the lead as a tonic, and may be sung below the lead, or even above the lead (and the tenor), in which case it is called "high baritone". Conversely, the more "soul" baritones have the more traditional timbre, but sing in a vocal range that is closer to the tenor vocal range. Some of these singers include David Ruffin, Wilson Pickett, Otis Redding, Tom Jones, Michael McDonald, and Levi Stubbs of the Four Tops.

== See also ==
- Category of baritones
- Fach, the German system for classifying voices
- Voice classification in non-classical music
- List of baritones in non-classical music
