= Felice Varesi =

Italian opera singer

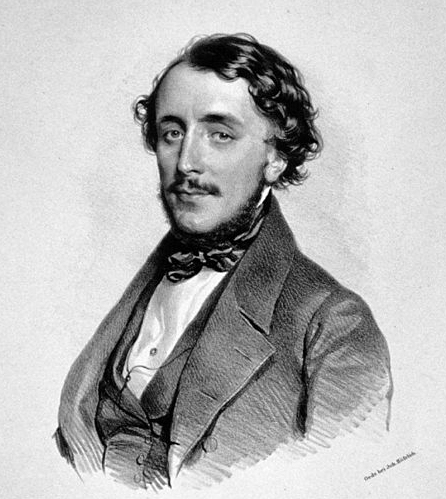
Felice Varesi, lithograph by Josef Kriehuber, 1843

Felice Varesi (1813 in Calais – 13 March 1889 in Milan) was a French-born Italian baritone with an illustrious singing career that began in the 1830s and extended into the 1860s. He is best remembered today for his close association with several famous operas composed by Giuseppe Verdi, whose birth year he shared.

== Career ==
Specializing initially in the bel canto operas of Verdi's predecessor Gaetano Donizetti, Varesi began his career in Varese in 1834 and went on to sing in Faenza, Florence, Modena, Rome, Perugia and Genoa. By 1841 he was singing at La Scala, Milan, and from 1842 to 1847 he was in demand in Vienna, where he appeared at the Kärntnertortheater. Here he created the role of Antonio in Donizetti's Linda di Chamounix as well as appearing in other works by the same composer.

In 1844 he sang the role of Don Carlo in Ernani at Padua, his initial Verdi opera, and later appeared as the Doge in Verdi's I due Foscari. In 1847, in Florence, he was the first Macbeth in Verdi's opera of the same name. Then, in 1851 at La Fenice, Venice, he created Verdi's Rigoletto, and in 1853, at the same house, he became Verdi's first Giorgio Germont in La traviata. Varesi disliked Germont's character but sang the part anyway.

He came to London in 1864 to perform Rigoletto – probably his best-known role – at Her Majesty's Theatre.

Varesi was admired for his intelligence, musicianship and acting ability as well as for the exceptional quality of his voice. He set the scene for a succeeding generation of great Verdi baritones that included Leone Giraldoni and Antonio Cotogni, while his chief contemporary rival was Giorgio Ronconi (the creator of Verdi's Nabucco).

He was married to the operatic soprano Cecilia Boccabadatti Gazzudo. Their daughter, Elena (1844–1920), also sang as a soprano, opening a singing school in Chicago following her retirement from the stage. Elena's daughter, Gilda Varesi, was an actress and playwright.

== Sources ==
- Forbes, Elizabeth (1992), 'Varesi, Felice' in The New Grove Dictionary of Opera, ed. Stanley Sadie (London) ISBN 0-333-73432-7.
- Harold Rosenthal and John Warrack (1979), 'Varesi, Felice' in The Concise Oxford Dictionary of Opera (second edition; London) ISBN 0-19-311321-X.
