= Carlo Ercole Bosoni =

Italian composer and conductor

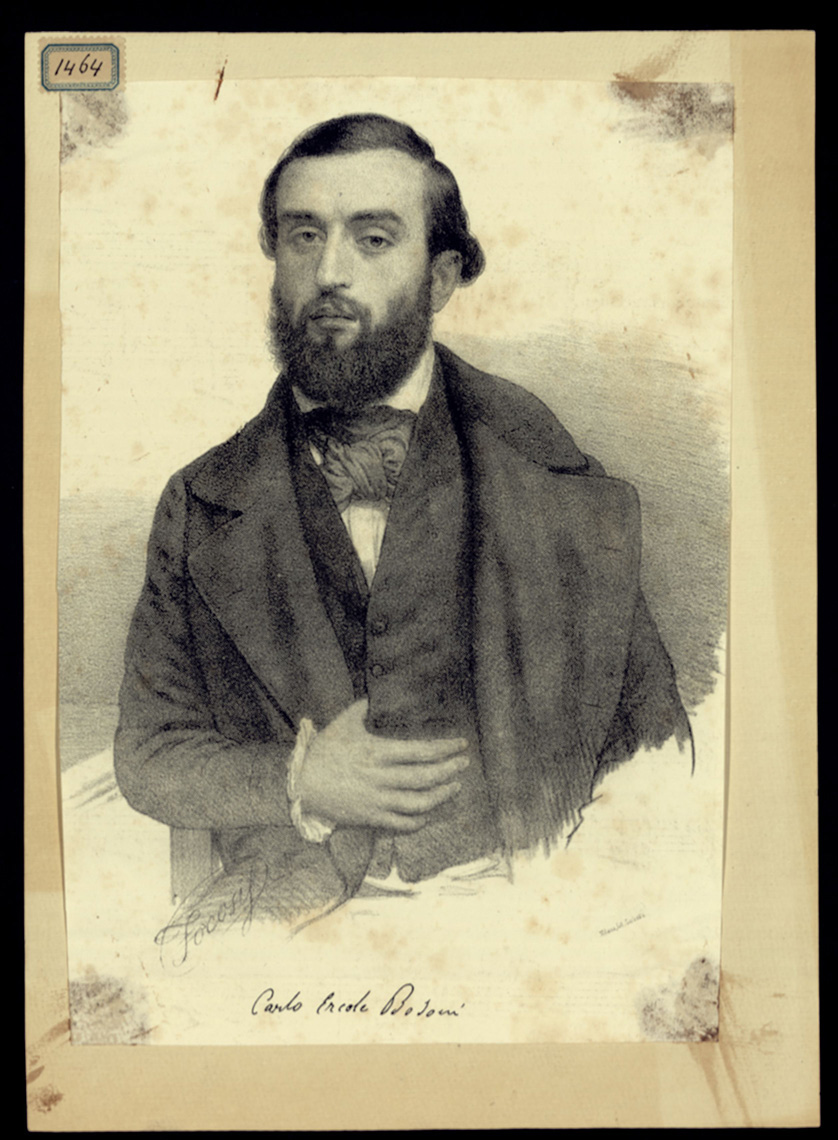
Carlo Ercole Bosoni

Carlo Ercole Bosoni (1826-1887) was an Italian composer and conductor. He was active as a conductor at La Fenice in Venice during the 1850s and 1870s. Some of his operas premiered there as well.
