= La traviata =

1853 opera by Giuseppe Verdi

- Opera by Giuseppe Verdi
- Violetta's costume, premiere 1853
- Other title: Violetta
- Librettist: Francesco Maria Piave
- Language: Italian
- Based on: La Dame aux camélias by Alexandre Dumas fils
- Premiere: 6 March 1853; Teatro La Fenice, Venice

La traviata (Italian: [la traviˈaːta, -aˈvjaː-]; The Wayward Woman) is an opera in three acts by Giuseppe Verdi set to an Italian libretto by Francesco Maria Piave. It is based on La Dame aux camélias (1852), a play by Alexandre Dumas fils, which he adapted from his own 1848 novel. The opera was originally titled Violetta, after the main character. It was first performed on 6 March 1853 at La Fenice opera house in Venice.

Piave and Verdi wanted to follow Dumas in giving the opera a contemporary setting, but the authorities at La Fenice insisted that it be set in the past, "c. 1700". It was not until the 1880s that the composer's and librettist's original wishes were carried out and "realistic" productions were staged. La traviata has become immensely popular and is among the most frequently performed of all operas.

== Composition history ==
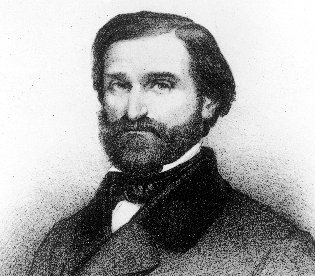
Verdi around 1850

For Verdi, the years 1851 to 1853 were filled with operatic activity. First, he had agreed with the librettist Salvadore Cammarano on a subject for what would become Il trovatore, but work on this opera could not proceed while the composer was writing Rigoletto, which premiered in Venice in March 1851. In addition, personal affairs in his home town limited his activities that spring, but after Rigoletto's success in Venice, an additional commission was offered by Brenna, the secretary of La Fenice.

=== Verdi sees The Lady of the Camellias play ===
Verdi and Giuseppina Strepponi visited Paris from late 1851 and into March 1852. In February the couple attended a performance of Alexander Dumas fils' The Lady of the Camellias. As a result of this, Verdi's biographer Mary Jane Phillips-Matz reports, the composer immediately began to compose music for what would later become La traviata. However, Julian Budden notes that Verdi had probably read the Dumas novel some time before, and, after seeing the play and returning to Italy, "he was already setting up an ideal operatic cast for it in his mind", shown by his dealings with La Fenice.

=== Composing for Venice ===
Francesco Maria Piave, librettist of the opera

Francesco Maria Piave was engaged to write the new libretto and the two men tried to come up with a suitable subject, but the composer complained that his librettist "had not yet offered him an 'original' or 'provocative' idea". Writing to Piave, he added that "I don't want any of those everyday subjects that one can find by the hundreds." But at the same time, the composer expressed concern about censorship in Venice, something with which he was very familiar after his dealings with the censors concerning Rigoletto. As the months dragged on into October, it was agreed that Piave would come to Sant'Agata (Verdi's home near Busseto) and work with the composer. One subject was chosen, Piave set to work, and then Verdi threw in another idea, which may have been La traviata. Within a short time, a synopsis was dispatched to Venice under the title of Amore e morte (Love and Death). However, Verdi wrote to his friend De Sanctis telling him that "for Venice I'm doing La Dame aux camélias which will probably be called La traviata. A subject for our own age." Although still bogged down at Sant'Agata, Piave was sanguine: "Everything will turn out fine, and we'll have a new masterpiece from this true wizard of modern harmonies".

When back at Sant'Agata in late January 1853 Verdi was reminded that his contract called for him to be in Venice within a week or two and for the premiere to be held on the "first Saturday in March 1853". However, it soon became clear that a modern-dress staging of the new opera was impossible—the requirement was that it should be set in the 17th century "in the era of Richelieu"—and reports from the opening of the season confirmed the limitations of the chosen soprano, the 38-year-old Fanny Salvini-Donatelli for taking the role of Violetta. Verdi was distraught, for he held on to the notion that the opera could be staged in modern dress—as Stiffelio had been done—Piave was sent back to Sant'Agata to no avail: he could not persuade the composer to back down on his insistence that another soprano be secured, yet the 15 January deadline for securing one had come and gone. Verdi was filled with premonitions of disaster upon his arrival in Venice on 21 February for rehearsals and he made his unhappiness clear to the singers.

== Performance history ==
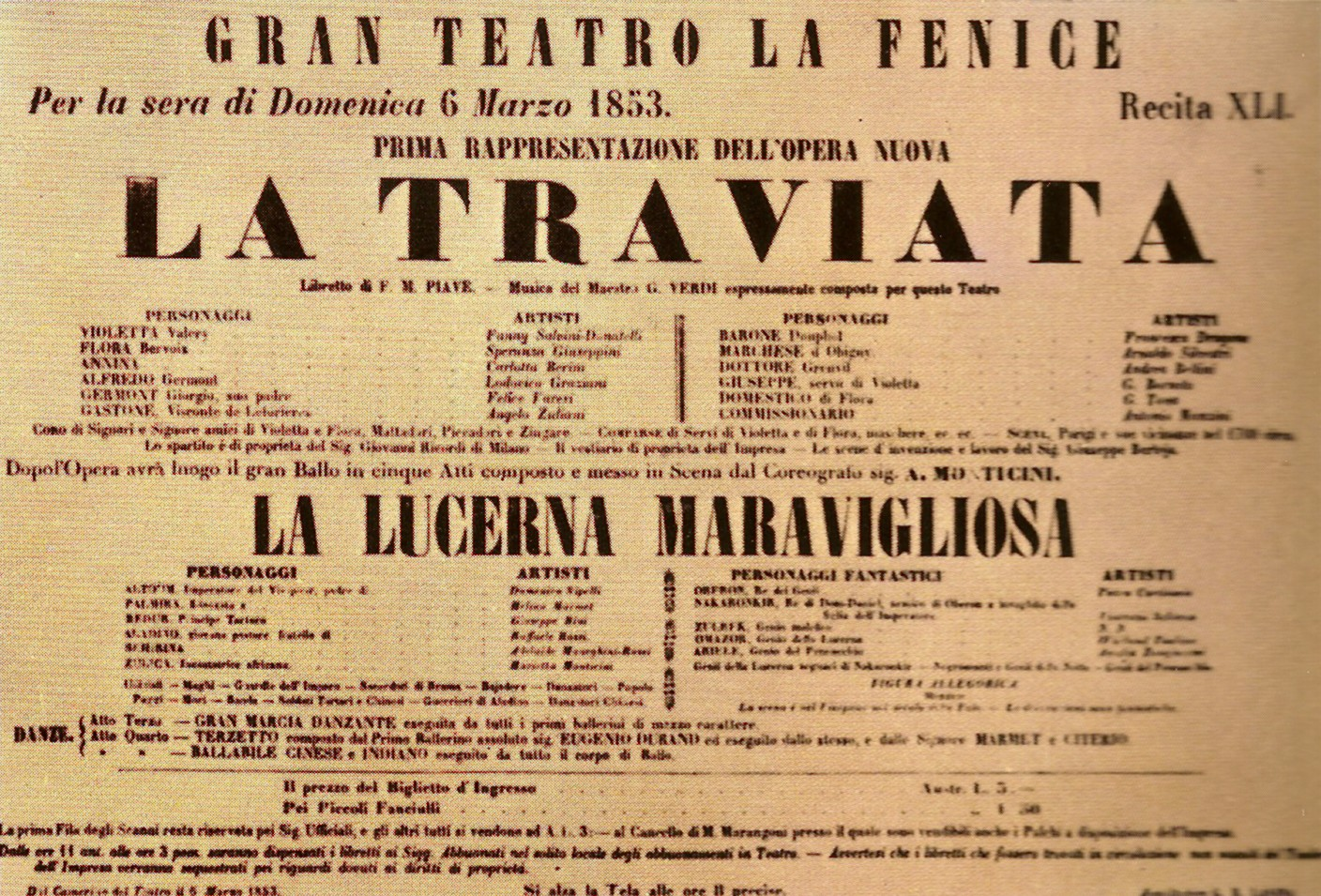
Poster for the world premiere

The audience jeered at times during the premiere, directing some of their scorn at the casting of soprano Fanny Salvini-Donatelli in the lead role of Violetta. Though she was an acclaimed singer, they considered her to be too old (at 38) and overweight to credibly play a young woman dying of consumption. (Verdi had previously attempted to persuade the manager of La Fenice to re-cast the role with a younger woman, but with no success.) Nevertheless, the first act was met with applause and cheering at the end; but in the second act, the audience began to turn against the performance, especially after the singing of the baritone Felice Varesi and the tenor Lodovico Graziani. The next day, Verdi wrote to his friend Emanuele Muzio in what has now become perhaps his most famous letter: "La traviata last night a failure. Was the fault mine or the singers'? Time will tell."

Coincidentally, as Philips-Matz points out, an Italian translation of the play La Dame aux camélias was being presented just a short distance from La Fenice.

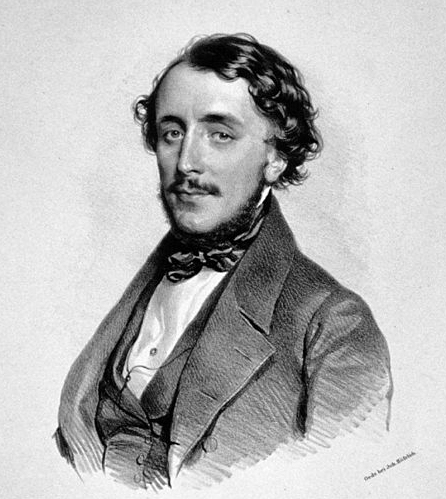
Felice Varesi, the first Germont père
(Litho: Josef Kriehuber)

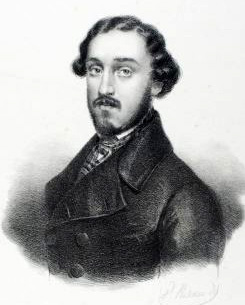
Lodovico Graziani c. 1845, the first Alfredo

While there were demands for productions from impresarios in various Italian cities, Verdi was loath to allow them unless he could be sure of the strength of the singers, and in spite of their pleas, the composer refused. As Budden notes, it came to be Venice "that made an honest woman of Violetta" when Verdi allowed a performance at the Teatro San Benedetto. Some revisions took place between 1853 and May 1854, mostly affecting acts 2 and 3, but the opera was performed again on 6 May 1854 and was a great success, largely due to Maria Spezia-Aldighieri's portrayal of Violetta. "Then [referring to the La Fenice performances] it was a fiasco; now it has created a furore. Draw your own conclusions!" reported Piave (who had overseen the production in Verdi's absence).

The opera (in the revised version) was first performed in Madrid on 1 February 1855 with Spezia-Aldighieri at Teatro Real, in Vienna on 4 May 1855 in Italian and in Barcelona on 25 October at Gran Teatre del Liceu. It was first performed in England on 24 May 1856 in Italian at His Majesty's Theatre in London, where it was considered morally questionable, and "the heads of the Church did their best to put an injunction upon performance; the Queen refrained from visiting the theatre during the performances, though the music, words and all, were not unheard at the palace". It was first given in Buenos Aires at the Teatro de la Victoria by the Lorini company on 10 June 1856. The protagonist was Sofía Vera Lorini. It was first performed in the United States by the Max Maretzek Italian Opera Company on 3 December 1856 in Italian at the Academy of Music in New York. George Templeton Strong noted in his diary: "People say the plot's immoral, but I don't see that it's so much worse than many others, not to speak of Don Giovanni, which as put on the stage is little but rampant lechery", while the Evening Post critic wrote: "Those who have quietly sat through the glaring improprieties of Don Giovanni will hardly blush or frown at anything in La traviata."

The opera was first performed in France on 6 December 1856 in Italian by the Théâtre-Italien at the Salle Ventadour in Paris, and on 27 October 1864 in French as Violetta (an adaptation by Édouard Duprez, older brother of the tenor Gilbert Duprez) at the Théâtre Lyrique on the Place du Châtelet with Christina Nilsson in the title role. The French adaptation of the libretto was published in 1865.

According to the Encyclopædia Britannica, La traviata became one of the most frequently performed operas during Verdi's lifetime. It is often ranked highly on annual lists of most performed operas.

== Roles ==
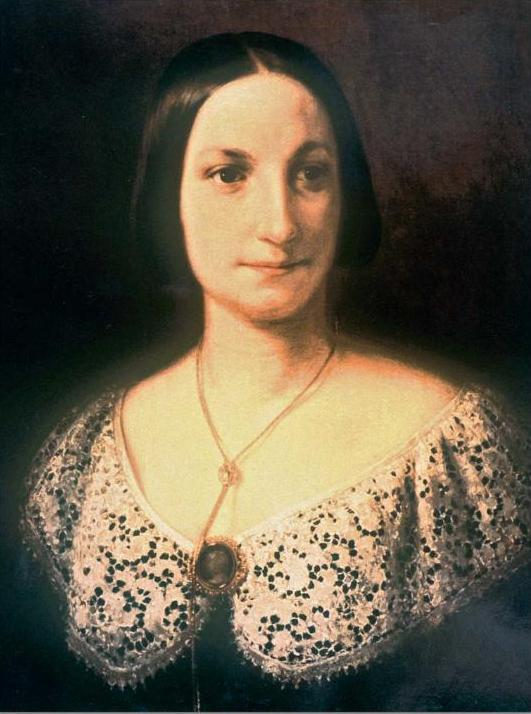
Fanny Salvini-Donatelli, the first Violetta

Roles, voice types, premiere cast
Role	Voice type	Premiere cast, 6 March 1853 Conductor: Gaetano Mares
Violetta Valéry, a courtesan	soprano	Fanny Salvini-Donatelli
Alfredo Germont, a young bourgeois from a provincial family	tenor	Lodovico Graziani
Giorgio Germont, Alfredo's father	baritone	Felice Varesi
Flora Bervoix, Violetta's friend	mezzo-soprano	Speranza Giuseppini
Annina, Violetta's maid	soprano	Carlotta Berini
Gastone de Letorières, Alfredo's friend	tenor	Angelo Zuliani
Barone Douphol, Violetta's lover, a rival of Alfredo	baritone	Francesco Dragone
Marchese d'Obigny	bass	Arnaldo Silvestri
Dottore Grenvil	bass	Andrea Bellini
Giuseppe, Violetta's servant	tenor	G. Borsato
Flora's servant	bass	G. Tona
Commissioner	bass	Antonio Mazzini

== Synopsis ==
Prelude to act 1
New York Philharmonic, Arturo Toscanini, 1929

Place: Paris and its vicinity
Time: Beginning of the 19th century

=== Act 1 ===
The salon in Violetta's house

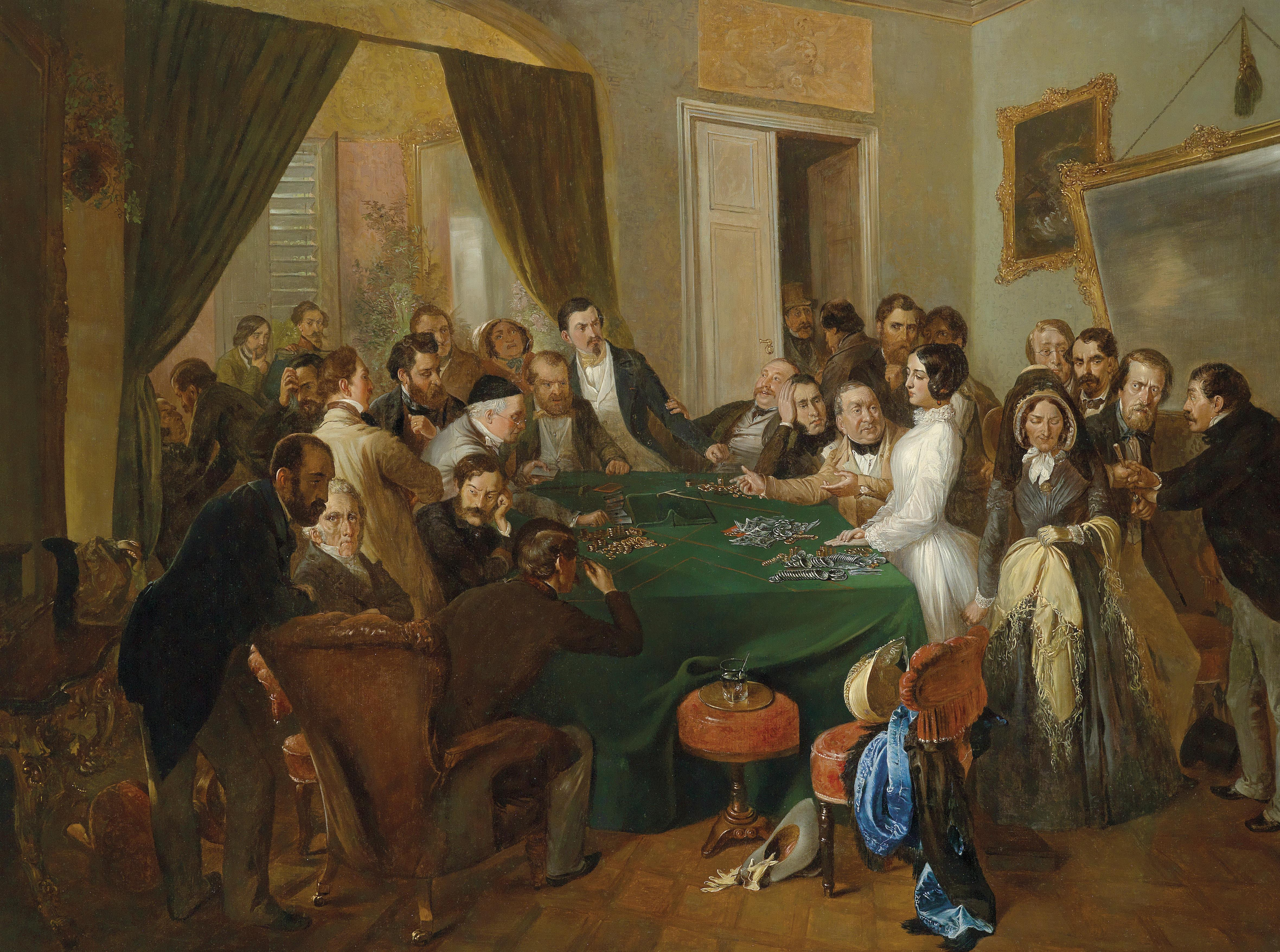
Scene 1: Party (attrib. Carl d'Unker)

Libiamo ne' lieti calici
Maria Callas and Giuseppe Di Stefano, Mexico City, 3 June 1952

Baron Douphol, Violetta's current lover, waits nearby to escort her to the salon. Once there, the Baron is asked to give a toast, but refuses, and the crowd turns to Alfredo, who agrees to sing a brindisi – a drinking song (Alfredo, Violetta, chorus: Libiamo ne' lieti calici – "Let's drink from the joyful cups").

From the next room, the sound of the orchestra is heard and the guests move there to dance. After a series of severe coughs and almost fainting, Violetta begins to feel dizzy and asks her guests to go ahead and to leave her to rest until she recovers. While the guests dance in the next room, Violetta looks at her pale face in her mirror. Alfredo enters and expresses his concern for her fragile health, later declaring his love for her (Alfredo, Violetta: Un dì, felice, eterea – "One day, happy and ethereal"). At first, she rejects him because his love means nothing to her, but there is something about Alfredo that touches her heart. He is about to leave when she gives him a flower, telling him to return it when it has wilted, which will be the very next day.

"È strano! ... Ah, fors'è lui" / "Sempre libera"
Act 1 finale, sung by Lucrezia Bori in 1910 for Edison Records

After the guests leave, Violetta wonders if Alfredo could actually be the one in her life (Violetta: È strano! ... Ah, fors' è lui – "Ah, perhaps he is the one"). But she concludes that she needs freedom to live her life (Violetta, Alfredo: Sempre libera – "Always free"). From off stage, Alfredo's voice is heard singing about love as he walks down the street.

=== Act 2 ===
Scene 1: Violetta's country house outside Paris

Three months later, Alfredo and Violetta are living together in a peaceful country house outside Paris. Violetta has fallen in love with Alfredo and she has completely abandoned her former life. Alfredo sings of their happy life together (Alfredo: De' miei bollenti spiriti / Il giovanile ardore – "The youthful ardor of my ebullient spirits"). Annina, the maid, arrives from Paris, and, when questioned by Alfredo, tells him that she went there to sell the horses, carriages and everything owned by Violetta to support their country lifestyle.

Alfredo is shocked to learn this and leaves for Paris immediately to settle matters himself. Violetta returns home and receives an invitation from her friend, Flora, to a party in Paris that evening. Alfredo's father, Giorgio Germont, is announced and demands that she break off her relationship with his son for the sake of his family, since he reveals that Violetta's relationship with Alfredo has threatened his daughter's engagement (Giorgio: Pura siccome un angelo, iddio mi diè una figlia – "Pure as an angel, God gave me a daughter") because of Violetta's reputation. Meanwhile, he reluctantly becomes impressed by Violetta's nobility, something which he did not expect from a courtesan. She responds that she cannot end the relationship because she loves Alfredo so much, but Giorgio pleads with her for the sake of his family. With growing remorse, she finally agrees (Violetta, Giorgio: Dite alla giovine, sì bella e pura, – "Tell the young girl, so beautiful and pure,") and says goodbye to Giorgio. In a gesture of gratitude for her kindness and sacrifice, Giorgio kisses her forehead before leaving her weeping alone.

Violetta gives a note to Annina to send to Flora accepting the party invitation and, as she is writing a farewell letter to Alfredo, he enters. She can barely control her sadness and tears; she tells him repeatedly of her unconditional love (Violetta: Amami, Alfredo, amami quant'io t'amo – "Love me, Alfredo, love me as I love you"). Before rushing out and setting off for Paris, she hands the farewell letter to her servant to give to Alfredo.

Soon, the servant brings the letter to Alfredo and, as soon as he has read it, Giorgio returns and attempts to comfort his son, reminding him of his family in Provence (Giorgio: Di Provenza il mar, il suol chi dal cor ti cancellò? – "Who erased the sea, the land of Provence from your heart?"). Alfredo suspects that the Baron is behind his separation from Violetta, and the party invitation, which he finds on the desk, strengthens his suspicions. He decides to confront Violetta at the party. Giorgio tries to stop Alfredo, but he rushes out.

Scene 2: Party at Flora's house

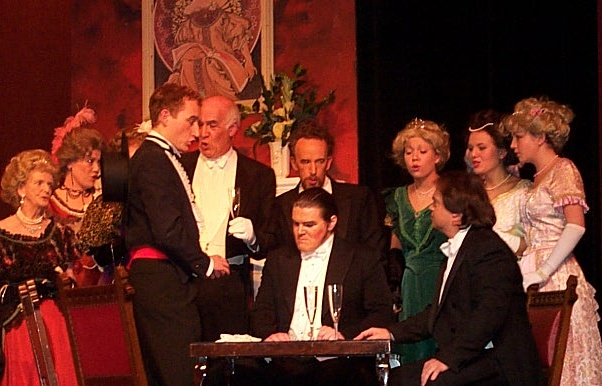
Act 2, scene 2 from Fife Opera's 2004 production

At the party, the Marquis tells Flora that Violetta and Alfredo have separated, much to the amazement of everyone who had previously seen the happy couple. She calls for the entertainers to perform for the guests (Chorus: Noi siamo zingarelle venute da lontano – "We are gypsy girls who have come from afar"; Di Madride noi siam mattadori – "We are matadors from Madrid"). Gastone and his friends join the matadors and sing (Gastone, chorus, dancers: È Piquillo un bel gagliardo Biscaglino mattador – "Piquillo is a bold and handsome matador from Biscay").

Violetta arrives with Baron Douphol. They see Alfredo at the gambling table. When he sees them, Alfredo loudly proclaims that he will take Violetta home with him. Feeling annoyed, the Baron goes to the gambling table and joins him in a game. As they bet, Alfredo wins some large sums until Flora announces that supper is ready. Alfredo leaves with handfuls of money.

As everyone is leaving the room, Violetta has asked Alfredo to see her. Fearing that the Baron's anger will lead him to challenge Alfredo to a duel, she gently asks Alfredo to leave. Alfredo misunderstands her apprehension and demands that she admit that she loves the Baron. In grief, she makes that admission and, furiously, Alfredo calls the guests to witness what he has to say (Questa donna conoscete? – "You know this woman?"). He humiliates and denounces Violetta in front of the guests and then throws his winnings at her feet in payment for her services. She faints onto the floor. The guests reprimand Alfredo (Di donne ignobile insultatore, di qua allontanati, ne desti orror! - "Ignoble insulter of women, go away from here, you fill us with horror!").

In search of his son, Giorgio enters the hall and, knowing the real significance of the scene, denounces his son's behavior (Giorgio, Alfredo, Violetta, chorus: Di sprezzo degno sè stesso rende chi pur nell'ira la donna offende. – "A man, who even in anger, offends a woman renders himself deserving of contempt.").

Flora and the ladies attempt to persuade Violetta to leave the dining room, but Violetta turns to Alfredo (Violetta: Alfredo, Alfredo, di questo core non-puoi comprendere tutto l'amore... – "Alfredo, Alfredo, you can't understand all the love in this heart...").

=== Act 3 ===
Violetta's bedroom

"Addio del passato"
Amelita Galli-Curci (1943)

"Parigi, o cara, noi lasceremo"
Fernando De Lucia, Giuseppina Huguet

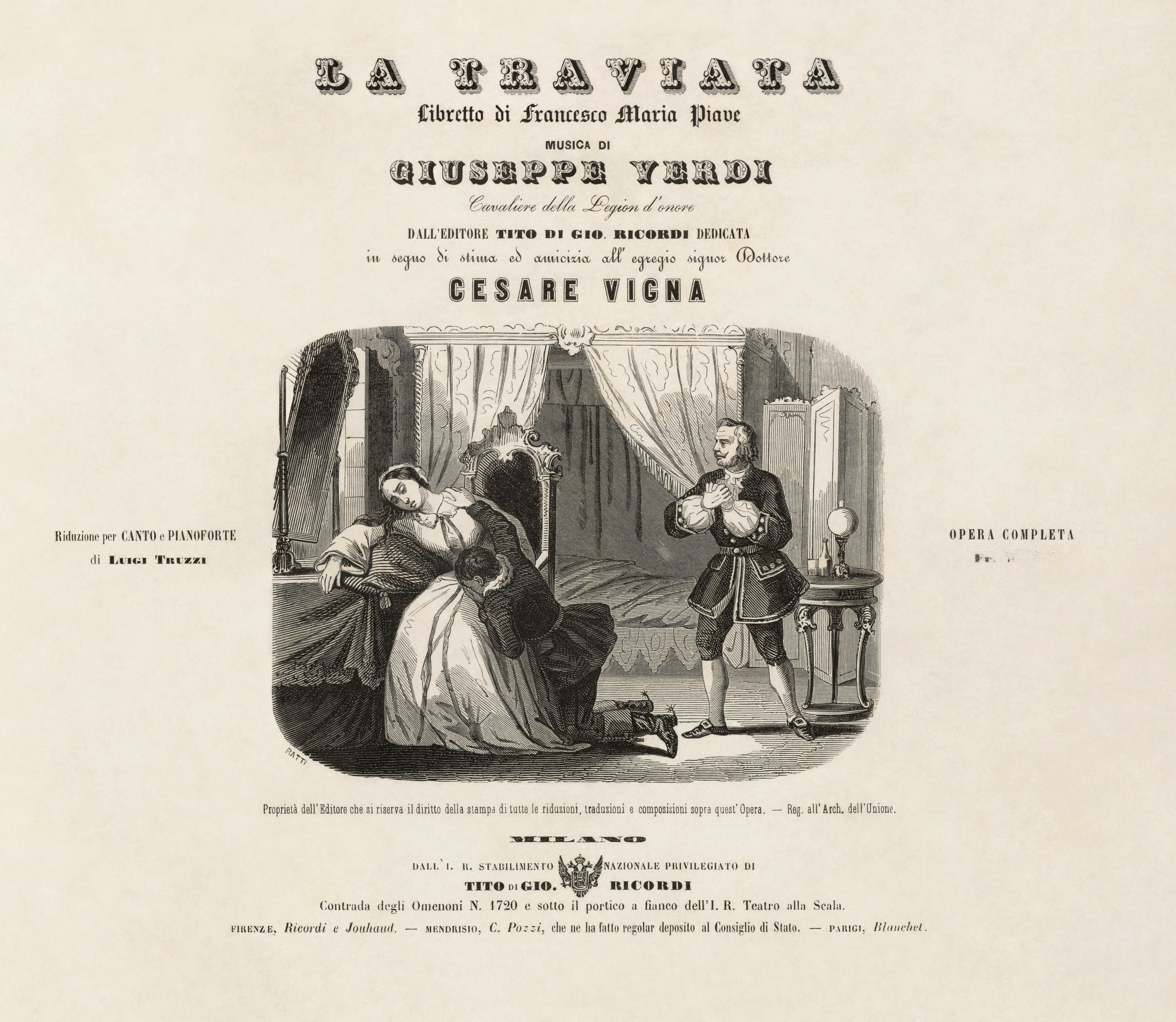
Cover of a circa 1855 vocal score with an engraving by Leopoldo Ratti

Dr. Grenvil tells Annina that Violetta will not live long since her tuberculosis has worsened. Alone in her room, Violetta reads a letter from Alfredo's father telling her that the Baron was only wounded in his duel with Alfredo. He has informed Alfredo of the sacrifice she has made for him and his sister; and he is sending his son to see her as quickly as possible to ask for her forgiveness. But Violetta senses it is too late (Violetta: Addio, del passato bei sogni ridenti – "Farewell, lovely, happy dreams of the past").

Annina rushes into the room to tell Violetta of Alfredo's arrival. The lovers are reunited and Alfredo suggests that they leave Paris (Alfredo, Violetta: Parigi, o cara, noi lasceremo – "We will leave Paris, O beloved").

But it is too late: she knows her death approaches (Alfredo, Violetta: Gran Dio!...morir sì giovane – "Great God!...to die so young"). Alfredo's father enters with the doctor, regretting what he has done. After singing a duet with Alfredo, Violetta suddenly revives, exclaiming that the pain and discomfort have left her. A moment later, she dies in Alfredo's arms.

== Instrumentation ==
The opera uses an orchestra with the following instrumentation: 2 flutes (fl. 2 doubling piccolo), 2 oboes, 2 clarinets, 2 bassoons, 4 horns, 2 trumpets, 3 trombones, harp, cimbasso, timpani, cymbals, bass drum, triangle, strings.

Banda: Verdi did not fully orchestrate the parts of the on-stage band, but rather composed it in the style of a piano reduction, leaving the actual realization to the person in charge of the band. Over the years many versions were created, varying from theater to theater depending on the instruments available, but none of them is authoritative. A widespread version is: 1 piccolo, 4 clarinets, 2 horns, flugelhorn, 3 trumpets, at least 2 trombones, low brasses (number unspecified), bass drum.

== Music ==
The prelude to the opera begins with very soft, very high strings depicting the frail heroine, followed by the main love theme of the opera, which is then played on lower strings while the higher instruments decorate the melody.

This delicate atmosphere is altered on curtain rise by lively dance tunes in the orchestra. After the famous "Brindisi", an offstage band plays a series of waltzes (waltz rhythms pervade the first act of the opera, creating a Parisian atmosphere). The concluding part of Violetta's solo scene that ends the first act is full of vocal decoration and feverish ornamentation as she swears to stay free ("Sempre libera"). These coloratura effects are not required for the character after the first act.

The lengthy and crucial duet between the elder Germont and Violetta in act 2 is multi-sectioned with the music following the changing dramatic situation.

La traviata is the only one of Verdi's many operas to be set entirely indoors. Unlike Il trovatore, which was composed simultaneously, La traviata is an intimate piece, full of tender lyricism. The character of Violetta dominates the work and her music changes as she develops through the drama, from the hectic, almost hysterical coloratura of the first act, to the more dramatic passages of the second, and the spiritual quality of her music as she dies in act 3.

== Documentaries ==
- The 2012 documentary film Becoming Traviata chronicles at length rehearsals for a production of La traviata directed by Jean-François Sivadier at the Aix-en-Provence Festival featuring Natalie Dessay and Charles Castronovo.

== Inspired music ==
- Donato Lovreglio (1841–1907), an Italian flautist and composer, wrote the "Concert Fantasy on themes from Verdi's La traviata", Op. 45, for clarinet and orchestra (published Ricordi, 1865); in it, Lovreglio used the overture and several arias from the opera.
- The Spanish composer Julián Arcas (1832–1882) wrote a "Fantasía sobre motivos de La traviata".

== In popular culture ==
An excerpt of the opera is heard in the second episode of the 2025 Italian miniseries Sandokan, though in an anachronistic manner, as the series is set in 1841, twelve years before it was composed.
