= List of schools in Estonia =

This is a list of schools in Estonia.

== Harju County ==
=== Tallinn ===
- Audentes School (IB DP)
- Audentes Sport Gymnasium (established in 2000)
- EBS Gümnaasium (EBS High School)
- Elfriede Lender Private Gymnasium (Elfriede Lenderi Eragümnaasium; 1907–1940)
- Elise von der Howen school (Elise von der Howeni tütarlastekool)
- Haabersti Vene Gümnaasium
- International Elementary School of Estonia
- Jakob Westholmi Gümnaasium (Jakob Westholm Gymnasium, Jakob Westholm Grammar School, Jakob Westholm High School)
- Kaarli School
- Karjamaa Gümnaasium
- Kivimurru Gümnaasium
- Pelgulinna Gümnaasium (Pelgulinna Gymnasium)
- Pelguranna Gümnaasium
- Secondary Science School of Tallinn (Tallinn 2. Secondary School, Tallinn's Second Gymnasium)
- Tallinn School No. 21 (Tallinna 21. Kool)
- Tallinna 32. Keskkool
- Tallinna Arte Gümnaasium
- Tallinna Audentese Erakool
- Tallinn European School (Tallinna Euroopa Kool)
- Gustav Adolf Grammar School (Gustav Adolfi Gümnaasium)
- Hanseatic School, Tallinn
- Tallinna Humanitaargümnaasium
- Tallinn English College (Tallinna Inglise Kolledž)
- Tallinna Järveotsa Gümnaasium
- Tallinn Jewish School (Tallinna Juudi Kool)
- Tallinna Kadrioru Saksa Gümnaasium
- Tallinna Kesklinna Vene Gümnaasium
- Tallinna Kristiine Gümnaasium
- Tallinna Kunstigümnaasium (Tallinn Art Gymnasium)
- Tallinna Kuristiku Gümnaasium
- Tallinna Laagna Gümnaasium
- Tallinna Lasnamäe Gümnaasium
- Tallinn Lasnamae Russian School (Tallinna Lasnamäe Vene Gümnaasium)
- Tallinna Lasnamäe Üldgümnaasium
- Tallinna Liivalaia Gümnaasium
- Tallinna Lilleküla Gümnaasium (Tallinn Lilleküla High School)
- Tallinna Linnamäe Vene Lütseum
- Tallinna Läänemere Gümnaasium
- Tallinn Mustamäe Secondary School (Tallinna Mustamäe Gümnaasium)
- Tallinna Mustamäe Humanitaargümnaasium
- Tallinna Mustamäe Reaalgümnaasium
- Tallinna Mustamäe Riigigümnaasium
- Tallinna Mustjõe Gümnaasium
- Tallinna Muusikakeskkool
- Tallinna Nõmme Gümnaasium (Nõmme High School)
- Tallinna Pae Gümnaasium
- Tallinna Paekaare Gümnaasium
- Tallinna Pirita Majandusgümnaasium (or Pirita Gymnasium of Economics)
- Tallinn High School for Boys and Girls
- Tallinn Polytechnic School (Tallinna Polütehnikum)
- Tallinn French Lyceum (Tallinna Prantsuse Lütseum)
- Tallinna Pääsküla Gümnaasium
- Tallinna Reaalkool
- Tallinna Rocca al Mare Kool Era-üldhariduskool
- Tallinna Saksa Gümnaasium
- Tallinna Sikupilli Keskkool (Tallinn Sikupilli High School)
- Tallinna Sõle Gümnaasium
- Tallinna Tehnikagümnaasium (earlier name 43rd Secondary School of Tallinn)
- Tallinna Tõnismäe Reaalkool
- Tallinn School of Transportation
- Tallinna Täiskasvanute Gümnaasium
- Tallinna Vaba Waldorfkool
- Tallinna Valdeku Gümnaasium (Tallinn Valdeku Gymnasium, earlier name 30th High School of Tallinn)
- Tallinna Vanalinna Hariduskolleegium
- Tallinna Vanalinna Täiskasvanute Gümnaasium (Tallinn's Old Town School for Adults, Tallinn Old Town Adult High School)
- Tallinna Järveotsa Gümnaasium
- Tallinna Õismäe Humanitaargümnaasium (Tallinn Õismäe Humanities High School)
- Tallinna Õismäe Vene Lütseum
- Tallinna Ühisgümnaasium (Tallinn Coeducational Gymnasium, Tallinn Coeducational High School)
- Sakala Eragümnaasium
- Vana-Kalamaja Täiskasvanute Gümnaasium
- Estonian SSR Teacher Training Institute (Tallinn Teacher Training College)

=== Other Harju County ===
- Aegviidu Põhikool
- Ardu Kool
- Aruküla Basic School (Aruküla Põhikool)
- Aruküla Vaba Waldorfkool
- Harkujärve Põhikool
- Harjumaa Folk University
- Harmi Põhikool
- Jüri Gümnaasium
- Kallavere Keskkool
- Kehra Keskkool
- Keila Gümnaasium
- Kernu Põhikool
- Kiili Gümnaasium
- Kolga Keskkool
- Kose Gümnaasium
- Kostivere Põhikool
- Kurtna Kool
- Kuusalu Keskkool
- Lagedi Põhikool
- Loksa Gümnaasium
- Loksa Russian Gymnasium
- Loksa 2. Secondary School
- Loksa 1. Secondary School
- Loo Keskkool
- Nissi Põhikool
- Oru Põhikool
- Padise Põhikool
- Paldiski Gümnaasium
- Paldiski Vene Gümnaasium
- Pikavere kool
- Prangli Põhikool
- Püünsi Põhikool
- Raasiku Põhikool
- Risti Põhikool
- Ruila Põhikool
- Saku Gümnaasium
- Saue Gümnaasium (or Saue Gymnasium)
- Tabasalu Ühisgümnaasium
- Turba Gümnaasium
- Viimsi Keskkool (Viimsi School)
- Peetri Lasteaed-Põhikool

== Hiiu County ==
- Käina Gümnaasium
- Kärdla Ühisgümnaasium
- Palade Põhikool
- Emmaste Põhikool

== Ida-Viru County ==
- Ahtme Gümnaasium
- Aseri Keskkool
- Avinurme Gümnaasium
- Iisaku Gümnaasium
- Illuka Põhikool
- Jõhvi Gümnaasium
- Jõhvi Vene Gümnaasium
- Kiviõli I Keskkool
- Kohtla Põhikool
- Kohtla-Järve Järve Gümnaasium
- Kohtla-Järve Ühisgümnaasium
- Lüganuse Keskkool
- Maidla Põhikool
- Mäetaguse Põhikool
- Narva 6. Kool
- Narva Eesti Gümnaasium
- Narva Gymnasium
- Narva Joala Kool (closed)
- Narva Humanitaargümnaasium
- Narva Kesklinna Gümnaasium
- Narva Paju Kool
- Narva Pähklimäe Gümnaasium
- Narva Soldino Gümnaasium
- Narva Vanalinna Riigikool
- Sillamäe Kannuka Kool
- Tammiku Gümnaasium
- Toila Gümnaasium

== Jõgeva County ==
- Adavere Põhikool
- Jõgeva Gümnaasium
- Jõgeva Täiskasvanute Keskkool
- Jõgeva Ühisgümnaasium
- Laiuse Põhikool
- Lustivere Põhikool
- J.V. Veski nim. Maarja Põhikool
- Mustvee Gümnaasium
- Oskar Lutsu Palamuse Gümnaasium
- Puurmani Keskkool
- Põltsamaa Ühisgümnaasium
- Tabivere Gümnaasium
- Carl Robert Jakobsoni nim. Torma Põhikool

== Järva County ==
- Albu Põhikool
- Ambla Põhikool
- Aravete keskkool
- Imavere Põhikool
- Järva-Jaani Gümnaasium
- Kabala Põhikool
- Koeru Keskkool
- Koigi Põhikool
- Laupa Põhikool
- Paide Hammerbecki Põhikool (Paide Hammerbeck Secondary School)
- Paide Gümnaasium
- Peetri Kool
- Retla Kool
- Roosna-Alliku Põhikool
- Türi Põhikool
- Türi Ühisgümnaasium

== Lääne County ==
- Haapsalu Gümnaasium
- Haapsalu Nikolai Kool
- Haapsalu Täiskasvanute Gümnaasium
- Haapsalu Wiedemanni Gümnaasium
- Kullamaa keskkool
- Lihula Gümnaasium
- Martna Põhikool
- Noarootsi Gümnaasium
- Noarootsi Kool
- Nõva Põhikool
- Oru Kool
- Ridala Põhikool
- Risti Põhikool
- Taebla Gümnaasium

== Lääne-Viru County ==
- Aaspere Põhikool
- Aluvere Põhikool
- Haljala Gümnaasium
- Jäneda Põhikool
- Kadrina Keskkool
- Kiltsi Põhikool
- Koeru Keskkool
- Kunda Ühisgümnaasium
- Laekvere Põhikool
- Lasila Põhikool
- Lehtse Põhikool
- Muuga Põhikool
- Rakke Gümnaasium
- Rakvere Eragümnaasium
- Rakvere Gümnaasium
- Rakvere Põhikool
- Rakvere Reaalgümnaasium (Rakvere Reaalkool)
- Rakvere Õhtukeskkool
- Rakvere Teacher Training College
- Rakvere Freedom School
- Ferdinand von Wrangell'i nim. Roela Põhikool
- Tamsalu Gümnaasium
- Tapa Gümnaasium
- Tapa Vene Gümnaasium
- Vinni-Pajusti Gümnaasium
- Väike-Maarja Gümnaasium

== Põlva County ==
- Fr. Tuglase nim. Ahja Keskkool (or Ahja Keskkool)
- Johannese Kool Rosmal
- Kanepi Gümnaasium
- Kauksi Põhikool
- Krootuse Põhikool
- Mikitamäe Põhikool
- Mooste Põhikool
- Orava Põhikool
- Põlva Keskkool
- Põlva Ühisgümnaasium
- Ruusa Põhikool
- Räpina Ühisgümnaasium (Räpina High School)

== Pärnu County ==
- Are Põhikool
- Audru Keskkool
- Häädemeeste Keskkool
- Jõõpre Põhikool
- Kihnu School
- Kilingi-Nõmme Gümnaasium
- Koonga Põhikool
- Metsapoole Põhikool
- Paikuse Põhikool
- Pärnjõe Põhikool
- Pärnu Hansagümnaasium
- Pärnu Koidula Gümnaasium (Koidula Gymnasium)
- Pärnu Kuninga Tänava Põhikool
- Pärnu Raeküla Kool
- Pärnu Rääma Põhikool
- Pärnu Sütevaka Humanitaargümnaasium
- Pärnu Täiskasvanute Gümnaasium
- Pärnu Vanalinna Põhikool
- Pärnu Vene Gümnaasium
- Pärnu Ühisgümnaasium
- Pärnu Ülejõe Gümnaasium
- Pärnu-Jaagupi Gümnaasium
- Sindi Gümnaasium
- Tõstamaa Secondary School (Tõstamaa Keskkool)
- Vändra Gümnaasium

== Rapla County ==
- Eidapere Põhikool
- Hagudi Põhikool
- Haimre Põhikool
- E. Vilde nim. Juuru Gümnaasium
- Järvakandi Gümnaasium
- Kabala Lasteaed-Põhikool
- Kaiu Põhikool
- Kehtna Põhikool
- Kivi-Vigala Põhikool
- Kodila Põhikool
- Kohila Gümnaasium
- Käru Põhikool
- Märjamaa Gümnaasium (Märjamaa High School)
- Rapla Vesiroosi Kool
- Rapla Täiskasvanute Gümnaasium
- Rapla Ühisgümnaasium (Rapla Secondary School)

== Saare County ==
- Aste Põhikool
- Kaali Põhikool
- Kaarma Põhikool
- Kahtla Põhikool
- Kihelkonna Põhikool
- Kuressaare Secondary School No. 2
- Kuressaare Gümnaasium (Kuressaare Gymnasium)
- Kuressaare Maritime School
- Kuressaare Põhikool
- Kuressaare Täiskasvanute Gümnaasium
- Kuressaare Vanalinna Kool
- Kärla Põhikool
- Leisi Keskkool
- Lümanda Põhikool
- Muhu Põhikool
- Mustjala Põhikool
- Orissaare Gümnaasium
- Ruhnu Põhikool
- Saaremaa Ühisgümnaasium
- Tornimäe Põhikool

== Tartu County ==
=== Tartu ===
- Tartu Annelinna Gümnaasium
- Tartu Audentese Erakool
- Tartu Descartes'i Kool (or Tartu Descartes Lyceum or Tartu Descartes School)
- Tartu Forseliuse Gümnaasium (Tartu Forselius School)
- Tartu Hugo Treffneri Gümnaasium
- Tartu Karlova Kool
- Tartu Katoliku Kool
- Tartu Kivilinna Gümnaasium (Tartu Kivilinna School)
- Tartu Hansa Kool (Tartu Hansa School)
- Tartu Commercial School
- Tartu Kunstigümnaasium
- Tartu Mart Reiniku Gümnaasium
- Tartu Miina Härma Gümnaasium
- Tartu Jaak Petersoni Gymnasium
- Tartu Jaan Poska Gymnasium (Jaan Poska Gymnasium)
- Tartu Boy's Gymnasium
- Tartu Nature House (Tartu Loodusmaja)
- Tartu Pushkini Gümnaasium (Tartu Pushkin Girls' High School, Pushkin Girls' Gymnasium)
- Tartu Raatuse Gümnaasium
- Tartu Reaalkool (Tartu High School for Boys)
- Tartu Tamme Gümnaasium (Tartu Tamme Gymnasium)
- Tartu Technical School
- Tartu Täiskasvanute Gümnaasium
- Tartu Vene Lütseum (Tartu Vene Lyceum)
- Tartu Waldorfgümnaasium
- Tartu Teacher Training College (Tartu Teachers' Training Institute, Tartu Teachers' Seminar, Tartu Teachers' College)

=== Other Tartu County ===
- Anna Haava nim. Pala Kool (A. Haava Pala Basic School, Pala Comprehensive School)
- Juhan Liivi nimeline Alatskivi Kool
- Elva Gümnaasium
- Ilmatsalu Põhikool
- Kallaste Keskkool
- Kambja Ignatsi Jaagu Põhikool
- Kuuste Kool
- Kõrveküla Põhikool
- Laeva kool
- Luunja Keskkool
- Lähte Ühisgümnaasium
- Mehikoorma Põhikool
- Nõo Põhikool
- Nõo Reaalgümnaasium (Nõo Gymnasium)
- Puhja Gümnaasium
- Rannu Keskkool
- Rõngu Keskkool
- Võnnu Keskkool
- Ülenurme Gümnaasium (Ülenurme Gymnasium)

== Valga County ==
- Ala Põhikool
- Hummuli Põhikool
- Keeni Põhikool
- Lüllemäe Põhikool
- Otepää Gümnaasium
- Palupera Põhikool
- Puka Keskkool (Puka High School)
- Pühajärve Põhikool
- Tsirguliina Keskkool
- Tõrva Gümnaasium (Tõrva Gymnasium)
- Valga Gümnaasium (Valga Gymnasium, Valga City Gymnasium)
- Valga Kaugõppegümnaasium
- Valga Vene Gümnaasium

== Viljandi County ==
- Abja Gümnaasium
- Halliste Põhikool
- Kalmetu Põhikool
- August Kitzbergi nim. Karksi-Nuia Gümnaasium
- Kildu Põhikool
- Kirivere Põhikool
- Kolga-Jaani Põhikool
- Kõpu Põhikool
- Kärstna Põhikool
- Leie Põhikool
- Mõisaküla Keskkool
- Olustvere Põhikool
- Paistu Põhikool
- Raudna Põhikool
- Suure-Jaani Gümnaasium
- Tarvastu Gümnaasium (Tarvastu High School)
- Viljandi Jakobsoni Kool (Viljandi Jakobson High School)
- Viljandi Kesklinna Kool
- Viljandi Paalalinna Gümnaasium
- Viljandi Täiskasvanute Gümnaasium
- Viljandi Vene Gümnaasium
- Võhma Gümnaasium

== Võru County ==
- Antsla Gümnaasium (Antsla Gymnasium)
- Haanja-Ruusmäe Põhikool
- Krabi Põhikool
- Kuldre Põhikool
- Kääpa Põhikool
- Lepistu Põhikool (closed in 2008)
- Meremäe-Obinitsa Põhikool (Incomplete Secondary School of Obinitsa)
- Misso Keskkool
- Mõniste Põhikool
- Osula Põhikool
- Parksepa Keskkool
- Pikakannu Põhikool
- Puiga Põhikool
- Rõuge Põhikool
- Varstu Keskkool (Varstu Secondary School)
- Vastseliina Gümnaasium
- Võru Kesklinna Gümnaasium
- Võru Kreutzwaldi Kool (Võru Kreutzwald High School)
- Võru Gümnaasium
- Võru Täiskasvanute Gümnaasium
- Võru Teacher Training College

== See also ==
- List of universities in Estonia
- List of music schools in Estonia
