= Giraldoni =

Giraldoni is a surname. Notable people with the surname include:

- Eugenio Giraldoni (1871–1924), Italian opera singer, son of Leone
- Leone Giraldoni (1824–1897), Italian opera singer
