= Casta Diva =

Casta Diva can refer to:

- "Casta diva" (aria), aria from the opera Norma by Bellini
- Mandarin Oriental, Lake Como, a resort in Blevio, Como, Italy formerly known as Casta Diva.
- Casta Diva (1935 film), an Italian musical film
- Casta Diva (1954 film), an Italian drama film
