= Tallinn Secondary School of Science =

School in Tallinn

Coordinates: 59°26′02″N 24°44′56″E

- Tallinna Reaalkool
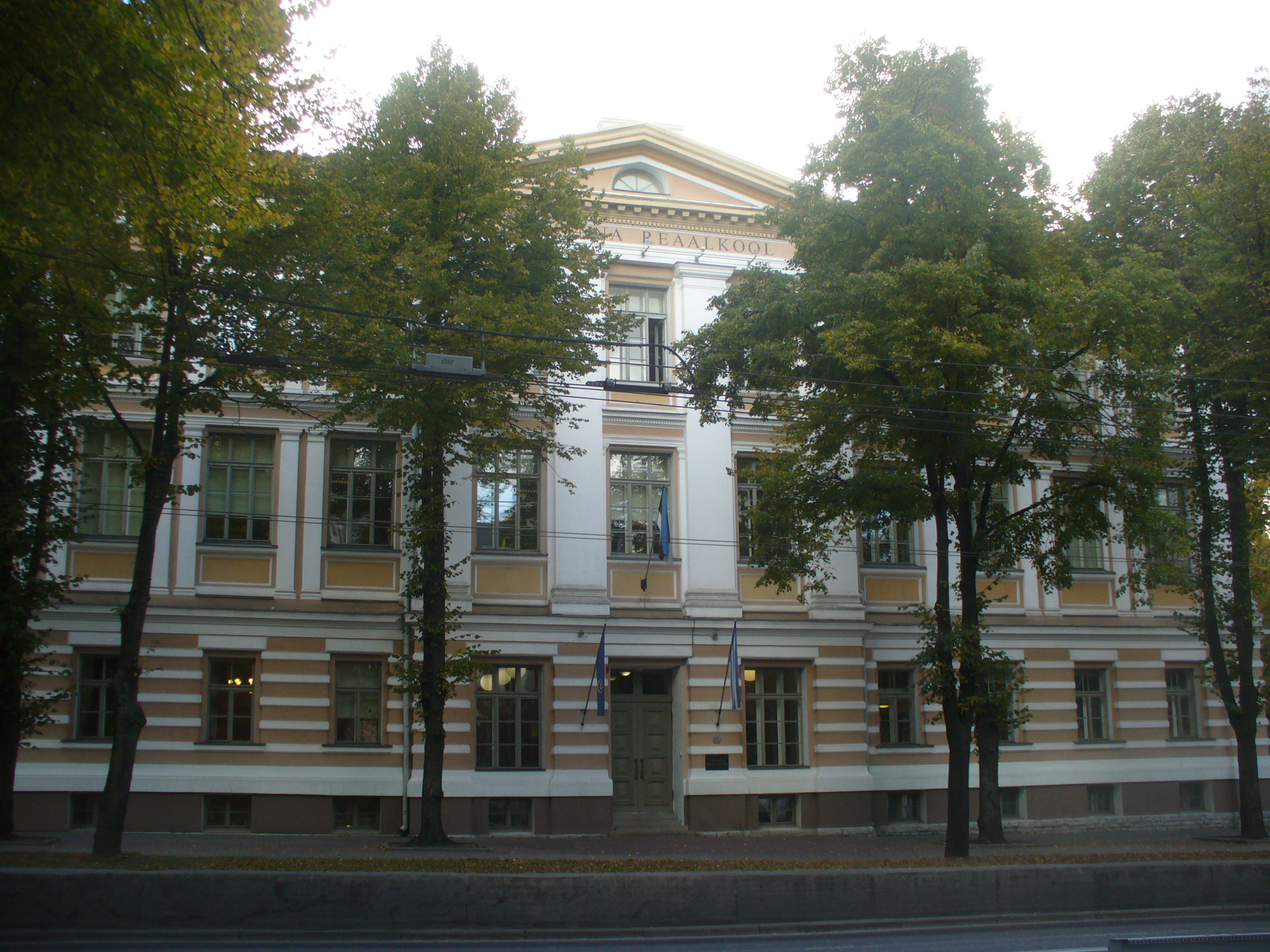
- Estonia puiestee 6, Tallinn, Estonia; Estonia

Information
- Type: Secondary School, Gymnasium
- Motto: Üks kõikide, kõik ühe eest! (One for all, all for one!)
- Established: 1881
- Director: Ene Saar
- Website: www.real.edu.ee

Tallinn Secondary School of Science (Estonian: Tallinna Reaalkool) is a gymnasium in Tallinn, Estonia.

The school is a member of the G5 Union of Schools which comprises what some call the "elite Tallinn city centre schools": Tallinn English College, Tallinn French School, Gustav Adolf Grammar School, Tallinn School No. 21.

== History ==
=== Establishment ===
In the second half of the 19th century, the Industrial Revolution reached Russia, including Estonia. The abolition of Tallinn's fortress zone in 1857 and the opening of the Baltic railway in 1870 gave Tallinn’s trade and industry the opportunity for strong development. Because of this, there was a need to reform the current education system. In 1872, a school law was issued in Russia, on the basis of which a new type of school was established in addition to the existing ones. Linking the need for a new educational institution to the 200th anniversary of Peter the Great's birth in the same year, the school was named Tallinna Peetri Reaalkool (German: Petri-Realschule zu Reval), which was supported by the city government and guilds with 1,700 silver rubles.

Initially, the teaching was in German and took place in a three-story stone house located against the city wall with the address Lai 49, but already in 1883 it was moved to a newly completed school building on Estonia puiestee. Mathematics teacher Peter Osse became the first director.

=== Tsarist era ===
As a result of the russification policy initiated by Tsar Alexander III, many subjects were now taught in Russian. Although the transition was delayed, in 1890 Russian became the official language of study.

Since 1915, the principal of Tallinn Secondary School of Science was Nikolai Kann, who was also chosen to be the principal of Tallinn Secondary School of Science, on August 1, 1920. He was the first Estonian to be a principal of a public high school. Kann taught German and history, and the boys called him "dire".

=== Activity during the establishment of the Republic of Estonia ===
The students and teachers of Tallinn Secondary School of Science, especially gymnastics teacher Anton Õunapuu, also played an important role in establishing an independent country, as well as protecting it in the War of Independence. Of course, we should not forget that many other teachers of the school, led by the later principal Karl Koljo, gymnastics teacher Voldemar Resel-Resev and drawing teacher Roman Nyman, participated in the war. In the summer of 1917, Anton Õunapuu, a teacher of Tallinn Secondary School of Science, also became a militia commissar of Tallinn. In 1917, Õunapuu founded a special unit (scout group) of students, which he called Õppiva Noorsoo Rood. 340 students, of which 82 were from Tallinn Secondary School of Science, participated in ÕN rood. ÕN rood created by Õunapuu became the first nationally minded force in Tallinn.

In 1917, Russia's internal disintegration continued due to World War I. Although the Bolsheviks, who came to power with the October revolution, aimed to get Russia out of World War I, this plan was not immediately realized. Germany continued its offensive on the Eastern Front, and in the fall of 1917 the islands of Western Estonia fell under German occupation. The advance of the German troops continued, and on February 23, 1918, the German troops reached the immediate vicinity of Tallinn.

=== Estonian War of Independence ===
On November 28, 1918, the War of Independence began. The majority of people and most of the soldiers, who were tired of the World War, lacked faith in the meaning of the war of independence and the possibility of preserving independence. The shortage of men and low combat morale forced the military leadership to take decisive steps to amend the front-line units, especially the crews of armored trains. Johan Laidoner, P. Kann and Johan Pitka went to the Beljajeva school to recruit young people to complete the new troops. Thanks to the proceleusmatic speech, it was possible to recruit 125 of the 200 boys, twelve of whom were from Tallinn Secondary School of Science. When general A. Tõnisson inspected the new volunteer units, he had to admit that there were too few of them as an infantry unit, and therefore they were assigned to Armored Train no. 2. Armored train no. 2 started with only ten wagons, but at the end of the war there were already as many as twenty. Initially, Armored Train no. 2 was in Aegviidu, from where the first mission was on December 28, 1918, the recapture of the town of Tapa, which was unsuccessful. However, the unit received its first real crossfire on the same day under Anna manor. The situation at the front was bad, out of nearly 12,000 men, 6,000 had deserted their unit and gone back home. Armored trains were in the best situation. The staff of the armored trains remained together because it consisted almost exclusively of volunteers and officers.

In December 1918, on the initiative of ensign Leopold Tõnson, the foundation of Kalevlaste Malev was laid in the buildings of Tallinn Secondary School of Science, the official permission was given by the Ministry of War on December 16, 1918. Among the organizers was Anton Õunapuu, the gymnastics teacher of Tallinn Secondary School of Science, who became the head of the machine gun commando, and Otto Tief. Already on December 20, 1918, the volunteer reception office, headed by Leopold Tõnson, started operating in the office of Tallinn Secondary School of Science. By December 22, Kalevlaste Malev had more than two groups of men together. They had barely trained for a week when Johan Pitka was ordered to make a landing on Loksa, 60 men took part in it. Before going to Viru front in Jõelähtme, there were 250 men in Kalevlaste Malev. It was with the help of the Kalevlasete Malev and also the Finns that they managed to put an end to the retreat. Rumors of the arrival of additional troops also encouraged the soldiers on other fronts to such an extent that all enemy attacks were repulsed. This moment, together with the arrival of the British fleet, can be considered a turning point in the War of Independence.

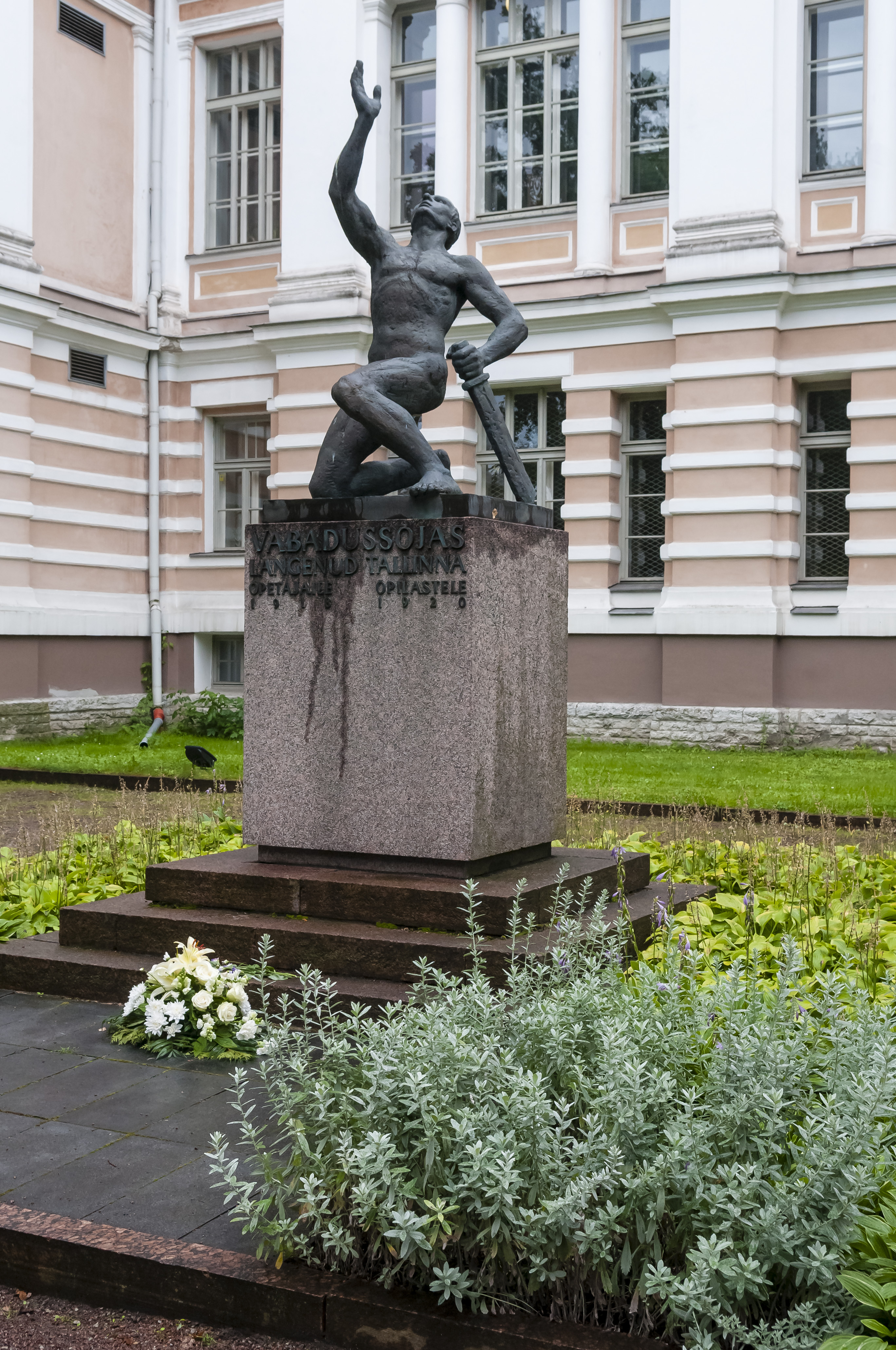
A memorial dedicated to the teachers and students of Tallinn who fell in the War of Independence, which is also called “Boy of the Science School”.

The first student soldier of Tallinn Secondary School of Science, who died in the War of Independence on December 8, 1918 was Harald Triigel. Initially, he was buried in the mass grave of Järve manor, but his father exhumed his body from there in 1919 and buried Harald's body in the current Siselinna cemetery. On May 9, 2000, Tallinn Secondary School of Science installed a dignified gravestone on his grave to commemorate the memory of the heroic soldier, which is visited by Tallinn Secondary School of Science every year on December 8. Thirteen days later, on December 21, 1918, the next student of Tallinn Secondary School of Science fell - Gunnar Dobka. The funeral service took place in Niguliste Church and the burial took place at the Tallinn Kopli cemetery. The burial ground has disappeared into nothingness with looting and leveling. Eugen Seeberg, the third student soldier of Tallinn Secondary School of Science in the ranks of Kalevlaste Malev defending Mõniste manor. The funeral arrangements took place in St. John's Church and he was buried in the Kopli cemetery - the fate of the grave is the same as that of Dobka. Artur Sisask was on Armored Train no. 2. He was killed on March 19, 1919, when Armored Train no. 2 landing group with marines and Armored Train no.1 men went to recapture Orava manor.

According to Märt Karmo, 84 students of Tallinn Secondary School of Science participated in the War of Independence (not all of them were at the front, however). There were 129 student soldiers in Gustav Adolf Gymnasium. In honor of all the students and teachers from Tallinn, who died in the War of Independence, a monument built in 1927 - Reaali Poiss - stands next to Tallinn Secondary School of Science, which is also the oldest monument of the War of Independence in Tallinn. The sculptor was Ferdi Sannamees and the architect was Anton Soans, an alumnus of Tallinn Secondary School of Science. In addition to the monument, there is a marble plaque made for the four students and Õunapuu who died in the War of Independence, which is located on the wall of Tallinn Secondary School of Science hall, which was opened on February 24, 1923.

=== World War II ===
Since Estonia entered the USSR's sphere of influence according to the non-aggression pact signed between Germany and the USSR on August 23, 1939, Hitler invited the Baltic Germans living in Estonia to return to their homeland. Because of that, in the fall of 1939, Paul Ederberg, nicknamed Pudi, a mathematics, physics and cosmography teacher who started working at Tallinn Secondary School of Science in 1919, also left. In Germany, Pudi also worked as a teacher, the last reports of him come from May 1945.

In the fall of 1940, after the occupation of the Republic of Estonia by the Soviet Union, the school year began with many changes: the teaching staff had partly changed, there were many changes in teaching. The school was renamed to Tallinna II Gümnaasium. For example, on August 7, 1940, Karl Koljo, who had worked as the school's principal since 1936, was removed from his position. Only recently, on January 25, 1940, had principal Karl Koljo encouraged class teachers to relentlessly defend and teach students the noble idea of Estonia retaining its independence.

=== Soviet occupation ===
Between 1945 and 1949, the headmaster changed five times. Then Tallinn Secondary School No.2 got its first female headmistress - Emilie Pertels, who worked at Tallinn Secondary School of Science between 1949 and 1953. Although Pertels was a member of the Communist Party of the Soviet Union, she never discussed party politics, nor did she show enthusiasm for promoting the official ideology. She was also not irreconcilably opposed to learning in Estonian or pro-Estonian manifestations. Pertels' main mark in the history of Tallinn Secondary School of Science is considered to be the final bell tradition that was made during her tenure.

Pertels was succeeded by Aleksei Tsõgankov, nicknamed Paša (in office from 1953 to 1970). Tsõgankov also taught the history of the USSR. Over time, he became a patriot of the school, who successfully linked the ideological guidelines and the practical life of the school. In 1955, he laid the foundation for the January alumni days, which replaced the alumni days held on September 29. To this day, Tallinn Secondary School of Science alumni day is held on the last saturday of January. During his time, the school was also changed into a mixed school and a building for primary classes was built next to the main building, which is called The Small House.

=== Notes from the history of Tallinn Secondary School of Science ===
- 1881 - Tallinna Peetri Reaalkool was founded with German as the language of study. The building of Tallinna Peetri Reaalkool has been recognized as cultural monument No. 1072.
- 1884 - the main building was completed, the first building designed as a school in Tallinn, architect Max Höppener and engineer Carl Gustav Jacoby.
- 1885 - first students of Tallinna Reaalkool graduated
- 1918 - student soldiers joined Kaitseliit and went to the War of Independence.
- 1921 - a black and gold school cap was introduced.
- 1927 - the "Boy" was opened - a monument to the teachers and students of Tallinn who fell in the War of Independence.
- 1954 - the school was changed into a mixed school
- 1958 - the new building, the so-called Small House, was completed.
- 1981 - a major renovation was done for the school's jubilee.
- 1993 - the monument to the teachers and students of Tallinn who fell in the War of Independence was restored.
- 2000 - the school continued to work in the thoroughly renovated school building.

=== School names ===
- 1881 Tallinna Peetri Reaalkool – Petri-Realschule zu Reval
- 1890 Ревельское Петровское Реальное училище
- 1918 Revaler Oberrealschule (German Science School for Boys, with German as the language of study) and Tallinna Linna Eesti Reaalkool (Estonian Science School for Boys, with Estonian as the language of study)
- 1919 Tallinna Linna I Reaalkool (Tallinn I Secondary School of Science)
- 1923 Tallinna Linna Poeglaste Reaalgümnaasium (Tallinn Gymnasium of Science for Boys)
- 1930 Tallinna Linna Poeglaste Gümnaasium (Tallinn Gymnasium for Boys)
- 1934 Gymnasium branch as Tallinna Linna 1. Poeglaste Keskkool (Tallinn 1st Boys High School)
- 1937 as two branches:
  - Tallinna 2. Progümnaasium (Tallinn 2nd Progymnasium) + Tallinna 2. Gümnaasium (Tallinn 2nd Gymnasium)
  - Tallinna 2. Reaalkool (Tallinn 2nd Secondary School of Science) + Tallinna Majanduslik Erikool (Tallinn Economic Special School)
- 1939 Tallinn’s Economic Special School was changed into Tallinna 2. Poeglaste Kommertskool (Tallinn 2nd Boys' Commercial School)
- 1940 Tallinna 2. Keskkool (Tallinn Secondary School No. 2)
- 1941 Tallinna 2. Gümnaasium (Tallinn 2nd Gymnasium)
- 1944 Tallinna 2. Keskkool (Tallinn Secondary School No. 2)
- 1990 Tallinna Reaalkool (Tallinn Secondary School of Science)

=== Headmasters ===
- 1881–1890 Peter Osse
- 1890–1915 Wilhelm Petersen
- 1915–1933 Nikolai Kann
- 1933–1936 kt. Ernst Peterson-Särgava
- 1936–1940 Karl Koljo
- 1940–1941 kt. Anton Lipping
- 1941–1945 Tiit Reinaste
- 1945 – Arnold Kurve
- 1945–1947 Johan Hansschmidt
- 1947–1949 Albert Kiitam
- 1949–1953 Emilie Pertels
- 1953–1970 Aleksei Tsõgankov
- 1970–1976 Oskar Radik
- 1976–1980 Hain Hiieaas
- 1980–1986 Harri Sirgi
- 1986–1995 Hain Hiieaas
- 1995 – kt Helen Kaasik
- 1995–1998 Mart Kuurme
- 1998–2014 Gunnar Polma
- 2014–... Ene Saar

== Symbols ==
=== School building ===
On June 10, 1881, the Tallinn city government made a decision to build a new school house for Tallinna Peetri Reaalkool. The location that was chosen was a spacious and large square at the corner of the current Estonia puiestee and Georg Otsa street. The main building of Tallinna Reaalkool is built in neoclassical style and was built in 1881-1883. The project was selected in an international architectural competition, architect Max Höppener, engineer Carl Gustav Jacoby. The main facade of the three-story, flat-roofed historicist building is articulated by a portico with rustic pilasters, which ends with a triangular pediment. The main floors are decorated with pilasters and cornices. Caryatids by the sculptor August Volz are placed between the hall windows opening onto the side facade.

The building has generally preserved its original form. The rooms are arranged around the central ceremonial staircase and next to it is a hall extending through the II and III floors, into which the corridors of the III floor open as a gallery. The grand staircase gives the house a sense of solemnity, while also ensuring sufficient light for the corridors. The main staircase connects the three floors with 106 steps, while the side stairs lead to the fourth floor with 196 steps. The main staircase is traditionally walked only with the handrail always on the right handside.

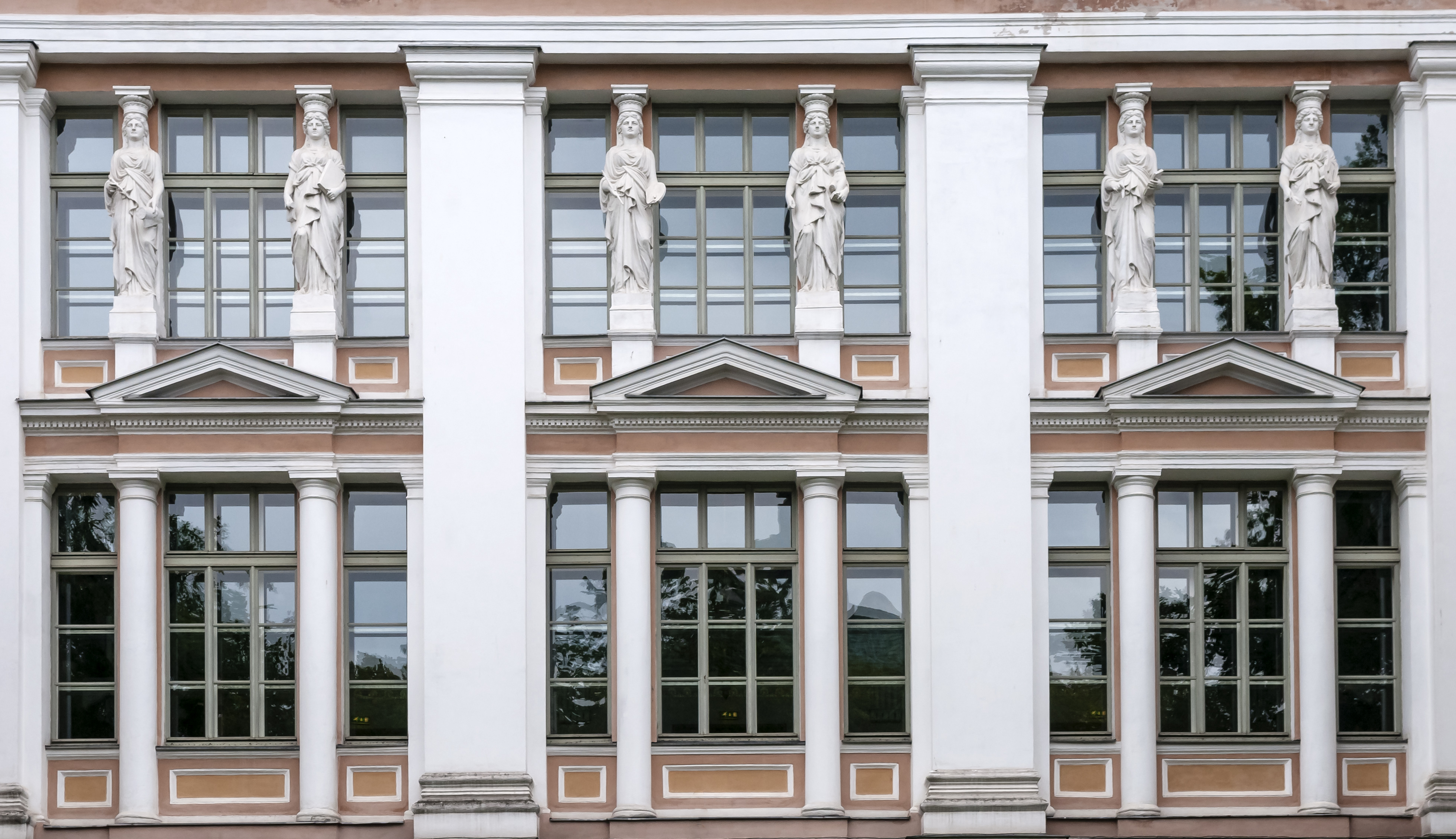
Caryatids on the facade that is facing the Georg Otsa street.

In the years 1999–2000, comprehensive restoration works took place in Tallinna Reaalkool, which ended in September 2000. The corresponding project was made in 1998-1999 in the project office of AS Tallinna Restauraator, the authors were architect Katrin Etverk and interior designer Tiiu Lõhmus, and it was implemented by AS Merko Ehitus. The fourth floor has been added to the building, without changing the historical exterior of the building. As far as possible, the known original color schemes have been restored. The works started in 1999 with the installation of external networks, in parallel, preparations for external finishing works and the construction of new staircases were started, demolition work was done indoors and structures were opened.

=== Student cap ===
A school cap of Tallinn Secondary School of Science made in the 1930s that belonged to Ilmar Mikiver.

The most common symbol of Tallinn Secondary School of Science is the student cap, which has a long history, during which the cap has also changed. In 1921, the artist, the school's art and drawing teacher Roman Nyman gave the cap its final shape and colour, which stands today. This design was approved by the pedagogical council and a year later by the Ministry of Education. It was probably during that time when the cap, made of black fabric, with golden stripes on the sides and zigzags on the bottom, got the right to life and remained a symbol and hallmark of the school for more than twenty years. In 1923, the school's pedagogical council decided to make wearing a student cap mandatory. After the school reform, the Ministry of Education made changes to the general regulation of student caps, as a result of which primary school students were no longer allowed to have golden zigzags on the bottom of their caps, but high school students retained this right. Today, the caps are placed on the heads of students by the school principal and class teacher before the opening ceremony of the school year.

=== School ring and badge ===
Next to the school cap, the school badge and the school ring are important symbols of Tallinn Secondary School of Science. It is rumored that the school badge was already in use in the early years of the 20th century, but the oldest badge that has been found dates back to 1918, although the 1916 alumnus Georg Meri has also claimed that their class had a similar badge. In 1924, the first design competition for badges was held, with the hope that by choosing the most liked design, a more solid and unified design could be perpetuated in the future.

However, the following year, 1925, a new competition was organized, which was won by Alfred Kang-Kaingi. In the design he created, you can already recognize the basic shape of all the later school badges. "The rhombus had lost its equilaterality and was replaced by two rhombuses and one triangle. The smaller, white rhombus at the top of the badge carries the class number. The triangle with blue and white vertical stripes (the colors of the flag of Tallinn and Tallinn Secondary School of Science) is the basis of a smaller rhombus and carries the text "T I R" as the second layer. The wings decorated with black and gold passing through the rhombus (each with six feathers) refer to the colors of the school cap".

As early as in the second half of the 1920s, school badges began to be distributed solemnly during the school's anniversary, i.e. on September 29. First, the headmaster at the time praised the good athletes and musicians, and then the seniors were given their badges. As a sign of respect, the seniors then gifted the graduation badges to the principal, the inspector, the class teachers (ordinaries) and also to a couple of their favorite teachers, promoting them to "honorary seniors". In addition to the ceremony of handing out the badges, there was also a tradition of blessing them. After the occupation of the Republic of Estonia by the USSR in June 1940, the making of school badges was prohibited. During the Khrushchev Thaw, in 1957, the making of school badges was revived, but not quite in the form of the former badge.

As previously written, since the red occupation that began in 1940, the making of school badges was prohibited, which meant that there was a need for a symbol that would unite all the graduates of Reaalkool. The choice fell in favor of school rings. This custom continued during the German occupation (1941-1944), although the making and wearing of rings was also prohibited for schoolboys then. It is said that the first rings were made already in 1938. The 1939 ring featured an R and oak leaves on an oval plate. Therefore, it cannot be said that only the banning of school badges was the reason why rings were started to be made. At the same time, the banning of school badges was one of the reasons why making rings became a tradition.

In the fall of 1940, the graduating class at that time decided to order school rings for themselves as well, and initially they wanted to take the 1939 ring as an example. But then it was concluded that the version with oak leaves was not suitable, and Heino Juurikas, a student in the final grade, who was good at drawing, made a new design - the letter "R" in a dozen corners on a round black enamel plate. Heino Juurikas also drew the school's motto "One for all, all for one" on the ring.

During the Soviet occupation, school rings were quite similar in design to today's rings. They were also silver, with a school badge on a black background in the middle. The main difference was that now the rings have the letter R and at that time it was IIK. In addition, the design of the oak leaves and text was slightly different, and the pattern around the school badge did not have the dot that current rings have. Both current and former rings have the school's motto, but the wording is slightly different. The rings of the 100th class have the inscription "One for all, all for one" and the current ones "All for one, one for all".

Despite the fact that the rings were not allowed to have the letter R, a few people from almost every class had their rings made with an R. All the rings had to be checked, but it was not done very thoroughly. Some of the students later had IIK replaced by R. Those who had relatives who had previously studied at Reaalkool wore old rings that also had the letter R on them.

=== Flag ===
Tallinna Peetri Reaalkool, founded in 1881, received its first flag as a gift from the parents in 1884, when the school's new building was ceremonially opened.

On April 21, 1989, a flag with a school badge with a red torch in the center and the letter R, redesigned to resemble the Roman numeral two, was confirmed as the official school flag. Above in the arch was the motto of the school and below Tallinn Secondary School No.2. The front of the flag was blue and the lettering was yellow. The other side of the flag was designed in blue and white stripes with the main colors of the flag of the city of Tallinn.

On September 28, 1991, i.e. the eve of the 110th anniversary, a new school flag was consecrated in Kaarli Church, with the inscription Tallinna Reaalkool and the letter R at the end.

On the occasion of the 120th anniversary of Tallinn Secondary School of Science in 2001, the school flag, which is still in use today, was blessed in Kaarli Church, where there was no longer a torch and the letters were white. The flag is used on national anniversaries and school festive events: the first day of school, the graduation ceremony and the final bell ceremony, alumni day, the school's jubilee ceremony and song party processions. The flag is carried by high school students and the flag is handed over at the graduation ceremony in the spring.

=== Marble plaque ===
A marble plaque has become a historical value symbol of Tallinn Secondary School of Science. In 1923, the marble plaque was opened in the school’s assembly hall for Anton Õunapuu, a teacher who fell in the War of Independence, and four students of Reaalkool - Harald Trigel, Gunnar Dobka, Artur Sisask and Eugen Seeberg. In addition to the names, the year and place of the fall are also indicated on the board.

During the first Soviet occupation, in 1940, the marble plaque was removed from the hall. During the German occupation, in 1941, the marble plaque was restored. During the second Soviet occupation, the plaque was destroyed and a bas-relief of Lenin and Stalin was placed in its place. The board was restored again only at the end of perestroika in 1990, before the Republic of Estonia regained its independence.

At every Independence Day event, a moment is dedicated to looking at the marble plaque and remembering the fallen.

== Traditions ==
=== Pudi’s line ===
Pudi's line is a characteristic way of moving for students of Tallinn Secondary School of Science, which is used both at important school events and outside of school, for example, when going after a prize in a sports competition. People walk one after the other in a row, hands behind their backs, a serious expression on their faces. All right angles must be walked out.

Pudi’s line is named after the legendary physics teacher Paul Ederberg (nicknamed Pudi). His students have described him as embodying the subjects he taught, that is, he was precise, abstract and dry. It is probably because of this that the students developed the habit of imitating the teacher's way of walking when going to Pudi’s class. Although this way of walking was associated with one particular teacher and his students, this custom has continued to this day and has acquired an important place in Reaalkool’s identity.

=== Tradition of receiving school badges ===
In the fall of the last year, high school graduates and their chosen teachers receive school badges at the badge ceremony.

All high school students participate in the evening dance party. At 9:00 p.m., the seniors sing the younger students out of the building with the verse: "Get out, get out of the school, because it's time to go to bed, who doesn't have a badge!". The badges are then redeemed according to a specific ritual.

=== Tradition of receiving school rings ===
This is a traditional event that happens outside the school building organized by the ring recipients themselves. The rings are redeemed according to a specific ritual (rapier, rings, silver cup, candles, Latin motto).

=== Seniors hazing the freshmen ===
The hazing of new high school students is an informal week-long event organized by high school seniors. The hazing begins with an introduction party on Saturday, includes various competitions and culminates with a flash mob and the blessing of new high school students.

=== Final bell ===
On the last day of school, people come to school in national clothes. There will be an assembly, which will end with Konstantin Türnpu's "Departing Song". The clock rings 12 times for the last time. After that, holding hands, they walk through the school premises, the stadium fences and the Town Hall square. The party ends with a picnic and folk games at the Rocca al Mare Open Air Museum.

=== Head washing of Särgava ===
Ernst Peterson Särgava was a long-time teacher of Estonian and school inspector in Reaalkool. The memorial erected to him was originally located in Kadrioru Park. In 1998, at the suggestion of the students of Reaalkool, the monument was relocated to the green area in front of Tallinn Secondary School of Science. In the same year, the tradition of washing Särgava's head also began, following which school seniors wash his head every year on April 29, the anniversary of Särgava's birth. Since the monument's nickname is the Beard, this operation is also called a head wash of the Beard. A candle is traditionally lit on Särgava's grave at Metsakalmistu at 6:00 p.m.

=== Alumni day called Reaali Sumin ===
Every year, the last Saturday in January is Alumni Day. During the day, students will compete against the alumni in the Grand Prikk tournament in basketball and volleyball. In the evening, classes meet in the school building.

=== Reaali Ramm ===
In memory of Georg Lurich, the competition Reaali Ramm is held, where the strongest student of Reaalkool is determined.

=== Celebrating Independence Day ===
Every year before the anniversary of the Republic, the student councils and principles of the three Tallinn schools that took part in the War of Independence (Tallinn Secondary School of Science, Jakob Westholm Gymnasium and Gustav Adolf Gymnasium) lay a joint wreath on the statue of students and teachers who fell in the War of Independence. The mayor of Tallinn will take part in the ceremony.

=== Celebrating Independence Day with the president ===
On the jubilee anniversary of the Republic of Estonia, every five years, an anniversary ceremony will be held in the assembly hall of Tallinn Secondary School of Science with the participation of the President of the Republic. Representatives of Tallinn schools that took part in the War of Independence (Tallinn Secondary School of Science, Jakob Westholm Gymnasium and Gustav Adolf Gymnasium) will take part in the ceremony.

=== School’s birthday ===
The school's birthday is celebrated every year on September 29 by eating birthday cake together, where the most outstanding students (for example, winners of international competitions) are awarded. At the same time, students are also given scholarships from funds created to promote the activities of Tallinn Secondary School of Science.
