= Giuditta Pasta =

Italian opera singer (1797–1865)

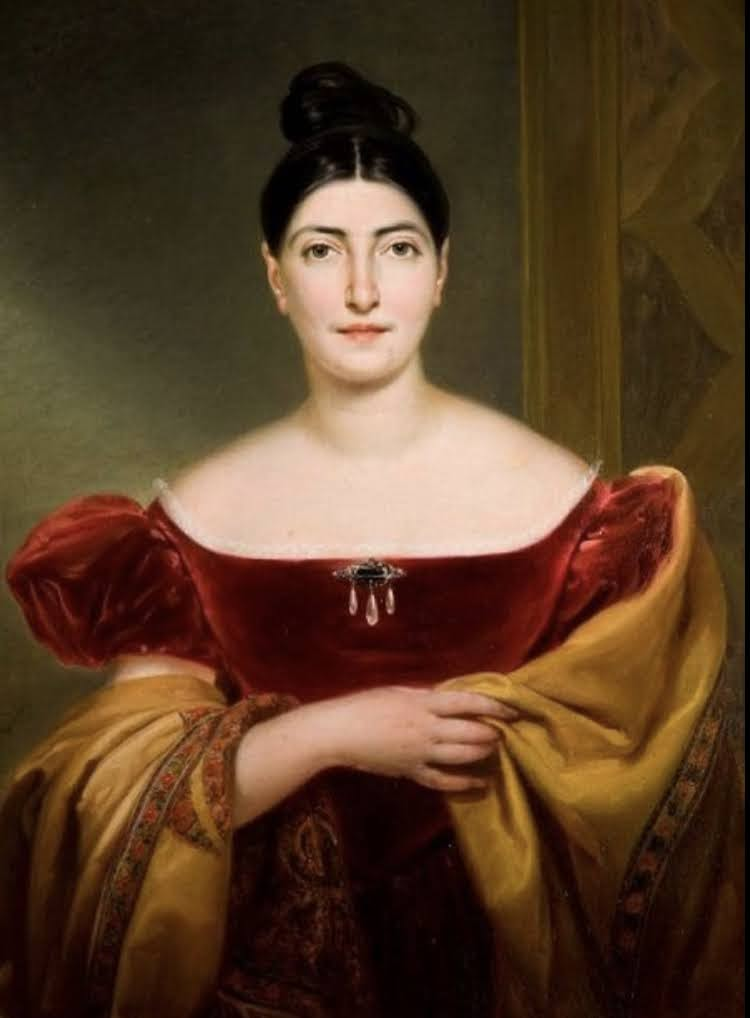
- Portrait held at Villa Roccabruna, by an unknown artist
- Born: Giuditta Angiola Maria Costanza Negri; 26 October 1797; Saronno, Cisalpine Republic
- Died: 1 April 1865 (aged 67); Blevio, Italy
- Occupation: Opera singer
- Years active: 1823–1854

Giuditta Angiola Maria Costanza Pasta (née Negri; 26 October 1797 – 1 April 1865) was an Italian opera singer. A soprano, she has been compared to the 20th-century soprano Maria Callas.

== Career ==
=== Early career ===
Pasta was born Giuditta Angiola Maria Costanza Negri in Saronno, near Milan, on 26 October 1797. She was born of the Negri family, who came from Lomazzo, where the family practiced medical art. Her father, Carlo Antonio Negri or Schwarz, was Jewish and a soldier in the Napoleonic Army. She studied in Milan with Giuseppe Scappa and Davide Banderali, and later with Girolamo Crescentini and Ferdinando Paer among others. In 1816, she married fellow singer Giuseppe Pasta and took his surname as her own. She made her professional opera début in the world première of Scappa's Le tre Eleonore in Milan that same year. Later that year she performed at the Théâtre Italien in Paris as Donna Elvira in Don Giovanni, Giulietta in Niccolò Antonio Zingarelli's Giulietta e Romeo, and in two operas by Paer.

Pasta's first appearance in London in 1817 was a failure. Further studies with Scappa were followed by a successful debut in Venice in 1819. She caused a sensation in Paris in 1821–22, in the role of Desdemona in Gioachino Rossini's opera Otello.

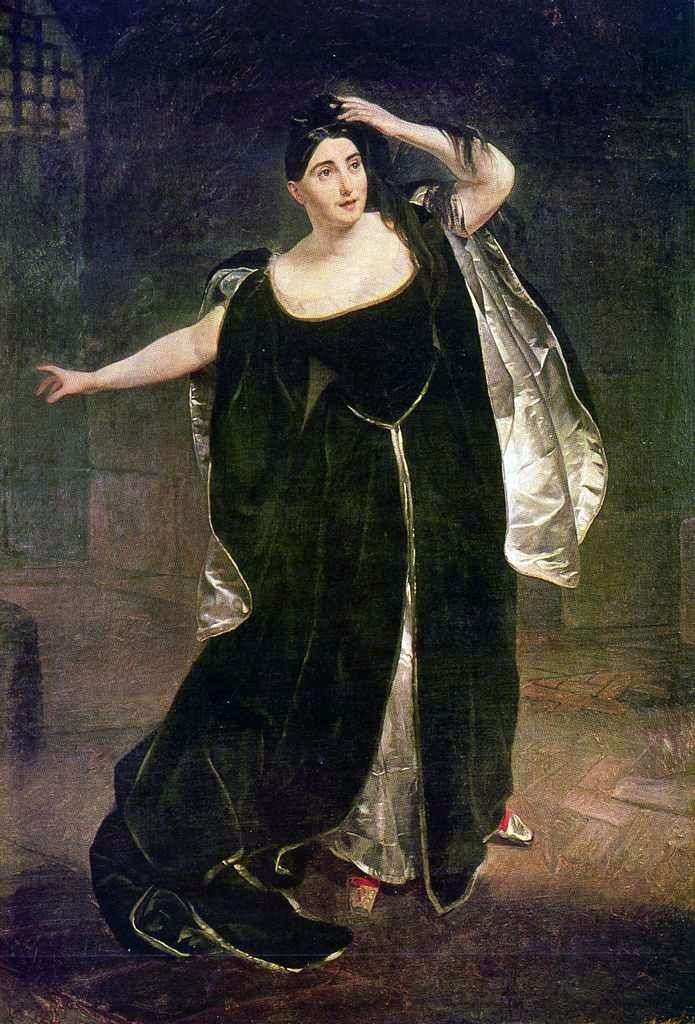
As Anna Bolena (Anne Boleyn), 1830, by Karl Bryullov

=== Roles written specifically for Pasta ===
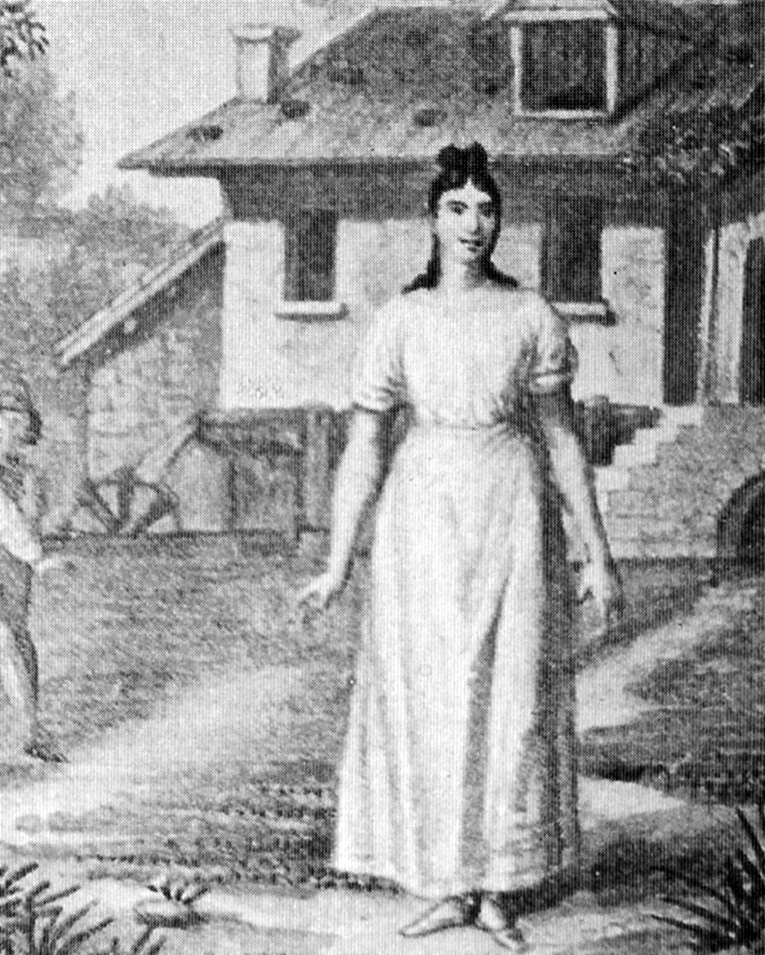
Giuditta Pasta as Amina, May 1831 premiere

She sang regularly in London, Paris, Milan and Naples between 1824 and 1837. In Milan she created three roles which were written for her voice. They were the title role of Donizetti's Anna Bolena given at the Teatro Carcano in 1830 (which was that composer's greatest success at that time), the Amina in Bellini's La sonnambula and the protagonist's part of his Norma (both in 1831), which became three of her major successes. Stendhal had argued persuasively in 1824 for the necessity of a score composed expressly for Pasta.

=== Later career ===
Pasta retired from the stage in 1835 and performed only infrequently after that date (including performances in London in 1837 and in Germany and Russia in 1840–1841.)

Pasta later taught singing in Italy. Among her notable pupils were contralto Emma Albertazzi and soprano Marianna Barbieri-Nini and the English soprano Adelaide Kemble. Another pupil was Carolina Ferni, herself a noted Norma, who in her turn taught the soprano Eugenia Burzio whose recordings are known for their passionate expression.

Pasta died in Blevio, a town in the province of Como on 1 April 1865, at the age of 67.

== Pasta's voice ==
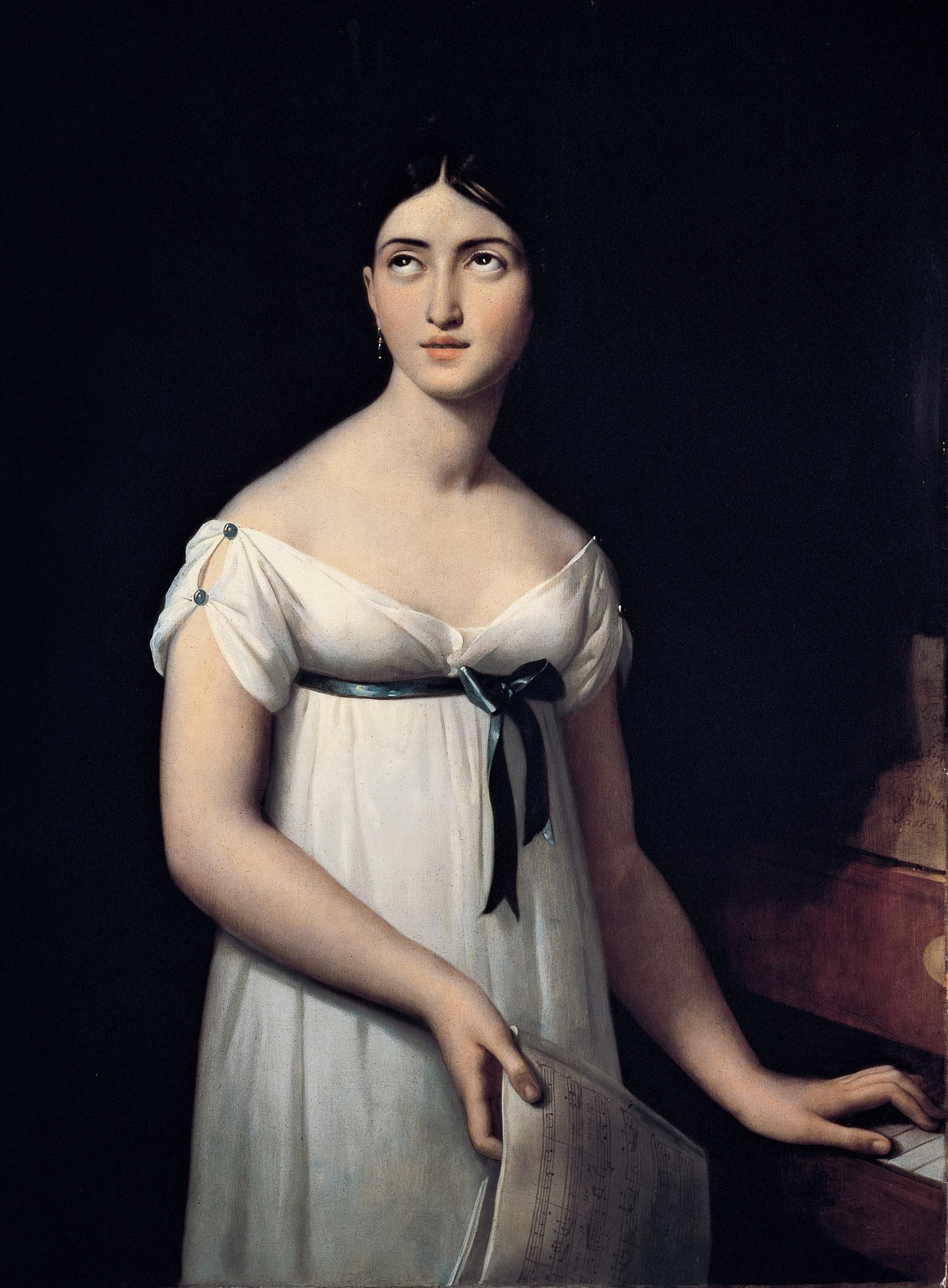
Pasta in 1821 by Gioacchino Giuseppe Serangeli

Giuditta Pasta's voice was described by a New Monthly Magazine reviewer in 1824 as follows:

It is a mezzo-soprano, somewhat similar to that of Madame Vestris, but clearer, more powerful, and of greater compass. She commands two octaves, but two or three of the highest notes of this range are forced, and not agreeable. Her middle tones are fine and full-bodied; but, occasionally, notes escape in the lowest half octave, which are husky and harsh. In point of cultivation and science, she possesses, first of all, the rare merit of a pure intonation. We have not heard her once out of tune.

Her voice type was what could be called a soprano sfogato. It was described by Stendhal as follows:

She can achieve perfect resonance on a note as low as bottom A, and can rise as high as C♯, or even to a slightly sharpened D; and she possesses the rare ability to be able to sing contralto as easily as she can sing soprano. I would suggest [...] that the true designation of her voice is mezzo-soprano, and any composer who writes for her should use the mezzo-soprano range for the thematic material of his music, while still exploiting, as it were incidentally and from time to time, notes which lie within the more peripheral areas of this remarkably rich voice. Many notes of this last category are not only extremely fine in themselves, but have the ability to produce a kind of resonant and magnetic vibration, which, through some still unexplained combination of physical phenomena, exercises an instantaneous and hypnotic effect upon the soul of the spectator. This leads to the consideration of one of the most uncommon features of Madame Pasta's voice: it is not all moulded from the same metallo, as it is said in Italy (which is to say that it possesses more than one timbre); and this fundamental variety of tone produced by a single voice affords one of the richest veins of musical expression which the artistry of a great cantatrice is able to exploit.

In 1829 named cantante delle passioni by Carlo Ritorni, one of the most erudite critics of the period, he described her as such because her voice was directed "towards expressing the most intense passions, accompanying it with expressions of physical action, unknown before her in the lyric theatre".

In modern times Susan Rutherford has made a specific comparison with Callas:

For the impact of corporeality on vocal timbre and delivery, and in the absence of Pasta's own explanations of its effect, we might turn to another distinctive attrice cantante (and one who sang much of Pasta's repertory) from a quite different period, Maria Callas. She also argued that gesture and facial expression must precede word in order to create the appropriate vehicle. It isn't merely fame that makes Pasta interesting [...] Pasta's singularity is measured rather by the tone and extent of the debates her celebrity provoked, by her influence on the operatic stage, and by the timing of her career at the transition from Rossinian opera to the works of Bellini and Donizetti (with all the stylistic ramifications this implied). No other singer during that period attracted as much intellectual discussion, or was regarded as of such significance in the articulation of theories around operatic practices. For such reasons alone, Pasta is deserving of critical attention.

== Sources ==
- Conway, David (2012). Jewry in Music. Cambridge: Cambridge University Press. ISBN 9781316639603
- Elson, Louis Charles, ed. (1912). "Giuditta Pasta". University Musical Encyclopedia (Great Vocalists).
- Pleasants, Henry (1981), The Great Singers, New York: Simon & Schuster, 2nd ed. ISBN 0-671-42160-3
- Rutherford, Susan (2007), "La cantante delle passioni: Giuditta Pasta and the Idea of Operatic Performance", Cambridge Opera Journal, Vol. 19, No. 2, July on jstor.org (subscription required)
- Stern, Kenneth (n.d.),"Pasta, Giuditta." Oxford Music Online; accessed 2 July 2017 (subscription required)
