= Kallista Kann =

Estonian linguist (1895–1983)

- Born: February 28, 1895; Dorpat, Governorate of Livonia, Russian Empire
- Died: March 23, 1983 (aged 88); Tallinn, Estonia
- Occupation: Linguist

Hermine Kallista Kann (February 28, 1895 – March 23, 1983) was an Estonian linguist and teacher.

== Early life and education ==
Kallista Kann was born in Tartu in the Governorate of Livonia, Russian Empire, the daughter of the schoolteacher Hans Kann (1849–1932) and Liisa Kann (née Pettai, 1856–1936). She was the sister of the music teacher Salme Kann. In 1913, she graduated from Tartu Pushkin High School for Girls, and she attended the university program for women in Kharkiv from 1916 to 1918.

From 1927 to 1932, she studied at the Faculty of Philosophy of the University of Tartu, graduating cum laude in 1932. From 1935 to 1936, she studied in Paris as a fellow of the French Research Institute of Tartu (Estonian: Tartu Prantsuse Teaduslik Instituut, French: l'Institut scientifique français de Tartu). In 1937, she defended her master's thesis La Place de l'Adjectif dans 'Erec et Enide' et 'Cligés' par Chrétien de Troyes (The Position of the Adjective in Érec et Énide and Cligès by Chrétien de Troyes) at the University of Tartu and received a master's degree (recognized in 1946 as a doctoral degree in philology).

== Career ==
From 1914 to 1925, Kann taught foreign languages in Ukraine and Georgia. From 1927 to 1935, during her university studies, she was the secretary of the French Research Institute of Tartu. From 1936 to 1944, she taught German and French at the Tallinn French School. From 1944 to 1945, she was the principal of Secondary School No. 4 in Tallinn (since 2006, Tallinn Kristiine High School).

From 1945 to 1949, she was a senior lecturer in the Department of Philology of Western European Nations (renamed the Department of Western European Languages in 1947) at Tartu State University. In 1949 she was named an associate professor, and she then taught the Department of Western European Languages from 1950 to 1952; in 1953 this was merged into the Department of Foreign Languages, where she taught from 1953 to 1961. From 1961 to 1963 she was head of the German Language Department, and from 1963 to 1966 an associate professor in the Department of German. She retired in 1966.

Her students included the poet and philosopher Jaan Kaplinski, the translator Nora Kaplinski, the translator and editor Leili-Maria Kask, the translator Lauri Leesi, the translator and literary scholar Ott Ojamaa, and the linguist and translator Henno Rajandi.

== Bibliography ==
- 1937: La Place de l'Adjectif dans 'Erec et Enide' et 'Cligés' par Chrétien de Troyes (master's thesis, University of Tartu)
- 1949: Grammaire française avec exercices (Tartu: Teaduslik Kirjandus)
- 1959: Prantsuse-eesti sõnaraamat (Tallinn: Eesti Riiklik Kirjastus)
- 1961: Saksa keele õpik 1, with Felix Kibbermann and Gerda Raadi (Tallinn: Eesti Riiklik Kirjastus)
- 1961: Saksa keele õpik 2 (Tallinn: Eesti Riiklik Kirjastus)
- 1964: Eesti-saksa sõnaraamat, multiple contributors (Tallinn: Eesti Riiklik Kirjastus)
- 1964: Praktische deutsche Phonetik für Esten, with Felix Kibbermann (Tallinn: Eesti Riiklik Kirjastus)
- 1966: Prantsuse keele õpik: kõrgematele õppeasutustele (Tallinn: Valgus)
- 1966: Prantsuse keele õpik: manuel de français (Tallinn: Valgus)
- 1979: Eesti-prantsuse sõnaraamat, with Nora Kaplinski (Tallinn: Valgus)
- 1979: Kirjad J. Silvetile (Tartu)
