= Carolina Ferni =

Italian musician (1846–1926)

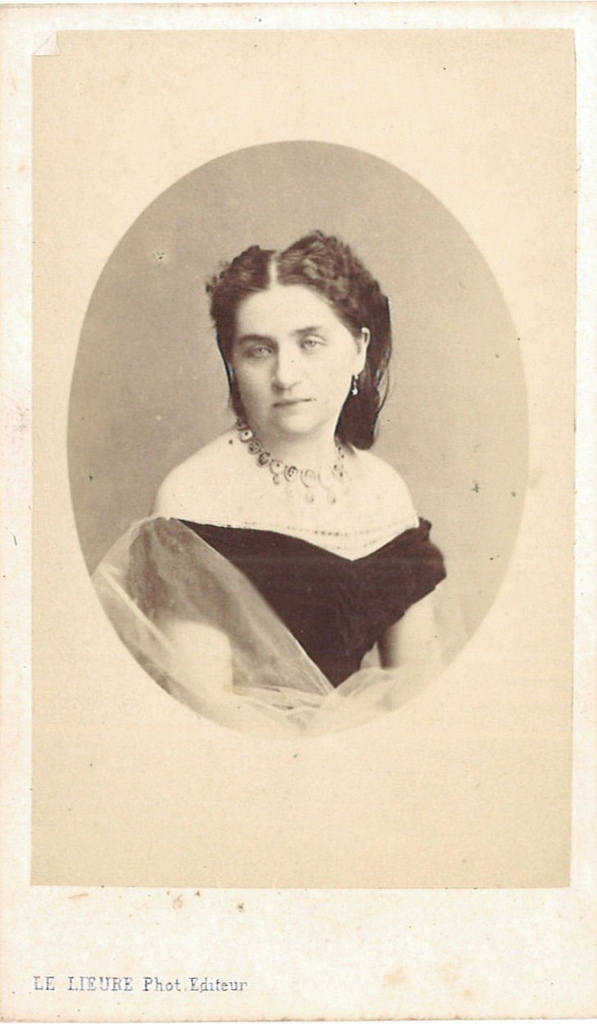
Carolina Ferni

Carolina Ferni (20 August 1839 Como – 4 June 1926 Milan) was an Italian violinist and operatic soprano.

== Biography ==
Ferni was born in Como. She began her career as a violinist in Paris and Brussels, and later studied voice with famed soprano Giuditta Pasta. She made her stage debut in Turin in 1862 as Leonora in Donizetti's La favorite. She sang at La Scala in Milan (1866–68) as Norma, Selika and Saffo, among other roles. In Agostino Mercuri's opera Il Violino del Diavolo, she both sang and played the violin.

She was married to the prominent Verdi baritone Leone Giraldoni (1824–1897). They had a son, Eugenio Giraldoni, whom she taught. Like his father, Eugenio became an operatic baritone, creating the role of Scarpia in Puccini's Tosca in 1900.

Ferni retired from the stage in 1883, and opened a singing school in Milan, and later in St. Petersburg, Russia. Among her students were the soprano Eugenia Burzio and the voice teacher Salme Kann.

She died in Milan in 1926, two years after her son.

== Sources ==
Volker Timmermann, Art. Virginia und Carolina Ferni, in: Lexikon Europäische Instrumentalistinnen des 18. und 19. Jahrhunderts, hrsg. von Freia Hoffmann, 2010.

Italian Wikiquote has quotations related to: Carolina Ferni

- Le guide de l'opéra, Mancini & Rouveroux (Fayard, 1986), ISBN 2-213-01563-5
