= List of hobby schools in Estonia =

This is the list of hobby schools (eg music schools, dance schools/studios) located in Estonia. The list is incomplete.

Name	Location (city/town, county)	Type (music, dance etc school)	Existing years	Further info	Image
Arsis Handbell School	Tartu, Tartu	music			
Estonian Academy of Music and Theatre	Tallinn, Harju	music, theatre			
Georg Ots Tallinn Music College	Tallinn, Harju	music			
Heino Eller Tartu Music College	Tartu, Tartu	music			
Kalev Sailing School	Tallinn, Harju	sailing		Estonian name: Kalevi Purjespordikool. Managed by Kalev Yacht Club	
Palupõhja Nature School	Tartu, Tartu	nature education			
Pärnu Music School	Pärnu, Pärnu	music			
Segal Music School	Tallinn, Harju	music	1903–1917		
Tallinn Art School (Tallinn Art High School)	Tallinn, Harju	art			
Tallinn School of Music and Ballet	Tallinn, Harju	music, dance			
Tallinn Music School (1991)	Tallinn, Harju	music		former Tallinn Children's Music School	
Tallinn Sports Boarding School	Tallinn, Harju	sport			
Tartu Children's Art School	Tartu, Tartu	art			
Tiina Kapper Dance Studio	Tartu, Tartu	dance	1919-1940	Led by Tiina Kapper	

== See also ==
- List of schools in Estonia
