= Tallinn French School =

School in Tallinn

Coordinates: 59.431041°N 24.741712°E

Information
- Staff: 80 (as of 2021/2022)
- Enrollment: 730
- Song: Plaisir d'amour
- Mascot: Kusti
- Nickname: TPL
- Publication: L'Air du Lycée
- Website: tpl.edu.ee

Tallinn French School or Tallinn French Lyceum (Estonian: Tallinna Prantsuse Lütseum), is a co-educational comprehensive secondary school in Tallinn, Estonia. It offers primary (years 1–9) and secondary education (years 10–12). Students perform consistently well in national exams, often placing the school in the national top 5.

== Present day ==
Students learn three foreign languages from an early age: French from year one, Russian from year three and English from year four.

Former principal Lauri Leesi believes the school is neither an arts nor a science school, it's a school where all knowledge is equally important.

The school has a policy regarding academic attendance: extracurricular activities are encouraged, but only outside class times.

Students are taught to appreciate the many forms of art, from being able to recognise and place paintings and artists to going to the theatre to enjoy a concert or a ballet. Ballroom dance is taught as part of the curriculum, culminating with the annual Spring Ball.

The school is a member of the G5 Union of Schools which comprises what some call the "elite Tallinn city centre schools": Tallinn English College, Tallinn Secondary School of Science, Gustav Adolf Grammar School, Tallinn School No. 21.

== Symbols ==
The school flag has two sides: one side features the French flag with the school's name in French, its coat of arms and motto (Probi estote per totam vitam – Be dignified all your life). The other side of the flag is similar except that the French flag is replaced by the Estonian flag and the school name is written in Estonian.

The students of the first five classes wear the school uniform, a traditional sailor suit, which is relatively uncommon in Estonia. On festive occasions the students wear the suit with a white collar, on normal schooldays with a blue collar.

All students of the school are expected to wear the school cap. The front of the cap is decorated with the initials of the school, the base of the cap is black, the sides are white and the top of the cap features the French tricolour.

Students who enter the 10th form may also receive the school ring, which comes in two styles. One is a plain silver ring with a round cylinder that is halved by a line (unofficially called "the pill"). The other ring is similar, but instead of the round cylinder it features the school initials and the French tricolour.

== History ==
=== Foundation ===
The initiative to found an Estonian school that concentrates on teaching the French language and culture came from the Republic of France. The French Institute in Estonia was founded in 1921 and soon after the institute turned to the Estonian Ministry of Education with the idea of establishing a school where French would be taught as the first foreign language – Tallinn French Gymnasium (the name was changed to Tallinn French School in 1923). Although the school opened its doors as early as 1 August 1921, its birthday is celebrated on 1 October when the first lessons were held.

=== The first 15 years ===
Tallinn French School started with 81 students, but the number of students grew over the years, reaching 500 students by 1937. The number of students at present is around 730, who are taught by 60 teachers.

Today, the main building of Tallinn French School is situated at 3 Hariduse Street and the building for younger students at 8 Hariduse St. After its establishment, Tallinn French School did not have its own building and moved from one location to another. On 1 October 1934 the French ambassador in Estonia announced that the Republic of France would support the construction of a new schoolhouse with 420,000 francs (100,000 Estonian kroons). Soon a property between Roosikrantsi and Vaestepatuste St was bought for the new school building.

=== Hariduse St building ===
In the 1930s one of the cultural priorities of the Estonian government was to advocate the English and French cultures (to lessen the German and Russian influences), so it was decided to support Tallinn French School. On 4 April 1935, when the president of Estonia Konstantin Päts visited the school, he announced that the government would support Tallinn French School with a further 100,000 kroons.

The cornerstone for the school building was laid in 1936 and construction was completed on 20 September 1937. Kallista Kann taught at the school from 1936 to 1944.

=== Tallinn Secondary School No. 7 ===
With the Soviet Union occupation of Estonia in 1940, Tallinn French School was closed and merged with Jakob Westholm Grammar School creating Tallinn Secondary School No. 7 (presently Tallinn English College).

=== Rebirth ===
After Estonia re-gained its independence in 1991, the alumni of the school from before World War II started a movement to restore Tallinn French School, resulting in its rebirth in 1992. After its re-establishment in 1992, Tallinn French School was given a school building at 38 Luise St. However, in 1994 Mr Leesi addressed Tallinn Secondary School No. 7, asking the school administration to give Tallinn French School back its historical building at 3 Hariduse Street. On 31 August 1996, the school moved back to Hariduse St.

== Arts ==
The architect of the school building is Herbert Johanson, an outstanding Estonian architect from the 1930s. The school building was built in the functional style.

Reproductions of works of art cover the walls of the school building (Modigliani, Picasso, Rembrandt, van Gogh etc.). Students in grades 6 through 12 take an annual test on these reproductions (artists, styles, etc.).

The school owns two original works that are displayed in the school halls. The first is an arras called Virvatuli 96 and is a gift from the author Lea Valter (who is an alumna of Tallinn French School). The second is a granite sculpture by Anton Starkopf, an Estonian artist of the 1930s. The statue is called Istuv akt (a sitting nude).

== Directors ==
After its foundation in 1921, Tallinn French School was coordinated by the French Institute. The first principal of the school was Hans Margens but he was soon replaced by Johan Kiivet. Bernhard Etruk took over the school after Kiivet and was the principal for four years. He was followed by Karl Vilhelmson (from 1928 to 1934), Gabrielle Brenot (1934) and Viktor Päss, who led the school for six years. Päss was especially honoured for his good spirit and professionalism.

When Tallinn French School was re-established in 1992 (after Estonia regained its independence in 1991), Lauri Leesi became the principal and held the post until 2018. As of September 2018, the principal is Peter Pedak.

== Alumni ==
see category:Tallinn French School alumni

- Georg Ots (opera singer; finished secondary school in 1938)
- Tanel Toom (film director)
- Maria Minerva (musician)
- Elina Nechayeva (opera singer)
