= Salme Kann =

Estonian voice teacher (1881–1957)

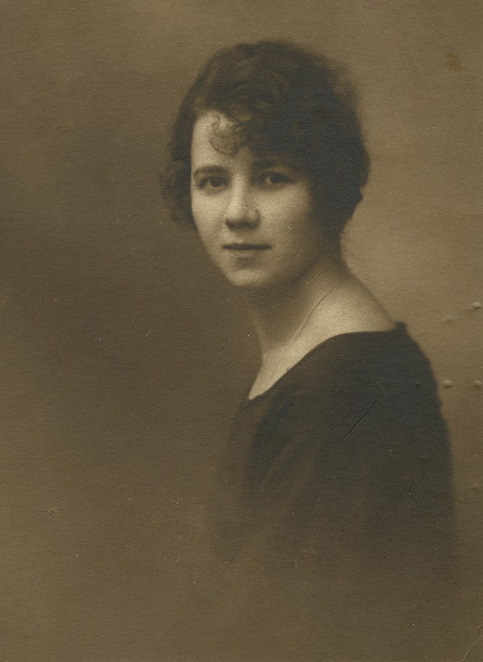
- Salme Kann
- Born: January 31, 1881; Kanepi, Governorate of Livonia, Russian Empire
- Died: October 26, 1957 (aged 76); Tartu, Estonia
- Occupations: Voice teacher and choir director

Salme Kann (January 31, 1881 – October 26, 1957) was an Estonian voice teacher and choir director.

== Early life and education ==
Salme Kann was born in Kanepi in the Governorate of Livonia, Russian Empire, the daughter of the schoolteacher Hans Kann (1849–1932) and Liisa Kann (née Pettai, 1856–1936). She was the sister of the linguist Kallista Kann. She studied singing at the Saint Petersburg Conservatory from 1902 to 1904 under Elizaveta Fyodorovna Zwanziger, from 1904 to 1906 under Carolina Ferni, and from 1906 to 1907 under Theodor Leschetizky, graduating in 1908. She then completed her studies in Milan (1908) and Florence (1909–1910).

== Career ==
In 1911, she returned to Estonia. During World War I, she worked as a nurse in Moscow, Voronezh, and Penza. She lived in Tartu from 1920, and from 1920 to 1930 she worked as a private singing teacher in Tartu. In 1926, she founded the Valgelindi Women's Choir at the Tartu Women's Temperance Union and was its choir director. In 1928, the Tartu Women's Singing Society was founded under the leadership of Salme Kann.

From 1940 to 1957, she worked as a teacher of classical singing at Tartu Music School. From August 25 to October 8, 1944, she was the acting director of the school. Her students included Margarita Miglau, Kalmer Tennosaar, and Hele Rähn.
