= Mandarin Oriental, Lake Como =

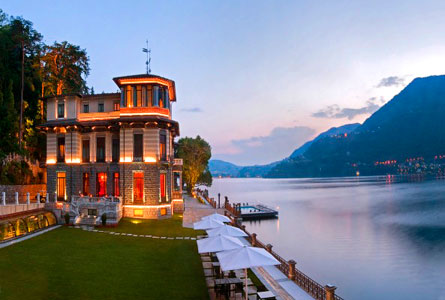
- Villa Roccabruna in the resort

- Location in Italy
- Former names: Casino Ribiere; Villa Roda; CastaDiva
- Hotel chain: Mandarin Oriental Hotel Group

General information
- Type: Resort hotel
- Architectural style: Neoclassical
- Location: Via Caronti, 69; 22020, Lombardy, Blevio, Italy
- Coordinates: 45°50′57.79″N 9°06′34.37″E

Renovating team
- Architects: Carlo Formenti; Philip Ferranti

Website
- mandarinoriental.com

Mandarin Oriental, Lake Como is a 5 star luxury resort located in Blevio in the province of Como, Italy. The estate is also known formerly as CastaDiva before its refurbishment in the late 2010s and subsequent transferral of ownership to its current owner, Hong Kong–based multinational chain Mandarin Oriental Hotel Group. The heart of the entire resort consists of the Villa Roccabruna, which was notably where composer Vincenzo Bellini wrote his two most famous works: La Sonnambula and Norma.

== History ==
Roccabruna Villa was built in the eighteenth century on the shores of Lake Como in the village of Blevio and was later restored by the opera singer Giuditta Pasta. The renovations were carried out between 1827 and 1829 by architect Philip Ferranti.

In the 19th century, the villa was known as "Casino Ribiere" from the name of the French owner, Ms. Ribier, a famous tailor and designer among Milanese aristocrats. The house was a meeting place for artists and musicians in contemporary Italy. Chronicles report that composer Gaetano Donizetti composed the tragic oper Anna Bolena during his residence in 1829. In 1827, the property was purchased by Italian opera singer Giuditta Pasta and renovated by her maternal uncle, architect Filippo Ferranti. Under Pasta's ownership, the property was nicknamed "Villa Roda" and expanded into a neo-classical manor with large garden areas and guesthouse outbuildings.

== Present day ==
The property was purchased by the Wild Family and the current structure of Villa Roccabruna was remodelled at the beginning of the 20th century. Throughout the second half of the 1900s, the estate had fluctuating periods, the end of which was almost ruin. The villa has since then been newly renovated and houses the CastaDiva Resort & Spa, which has 75 rooms, 2 restaurants, 4 conference rooms and a spa of 1,330 square metres (14,300 sq ft), under supervision of entrepreneur Gabriele Zerbi. The resort is named after the most famous aria from Norma, Casta Diva.

In 2014 Top Gear Series 21 Episode 02 was also filmed at the hotel. The CastaDiva Resort & Spa has been acquired by the Mandarin Oriental Hotel Group in 2018, with the property re-opened under new management in Spring 2019.

== Features ==
The resort offers 75 rooms: 24 guest rooms, 49 suites and two private villas in total, which are housed in nine separate building structures within the estate. Other than guest room facilities, the hotel is also outfitted with recreational amenities and dining outlets, including but not limited to:

- L˜ARIA restaurant, specialised in Italian-Japanese fusion cuisine.
- All-day dining outlet, CO.MO Bar & Bistrot.
- Pool bar, floating pool and pool deck outfitted with Jacuzzis
- Food truck with built-in pizza ovens that specialise in artisanal pizzas.
- Six treatment rooms, included two spa suite.
- A Technogym fitness centre.
- A heat-and-water experience area.
- A classical Amphitheatre and a glass-enclosed Greenhouse for outdoor events.
- A private villa, Villa del Lago.
