= Kanepi =

Borough in Estonia

- Location within Estonia
- Coordinates: 57°58′59″N 26°45′23″E
- Country: Estonia
- County: Põlva County

Population (2020)
  - Total: 560
- Time zone: UTC+2 (EET)

Kanepi (German: Kannapäh) is a small borough (alevik) in Kanepi Parish, Põlva County, in southeastern Estonia.

== Notable people ==
Notable people who were born in Kanepi include the following:

- Salme Kann (1881–1953), Estonian music teacher and choir director, born in Kanepi
- Hugo Treffner (1845–1912), educator, founder of the Hugo Treffner Gymnasium, born in Kanepi as a son of a local parish clerk

== Gallery ==
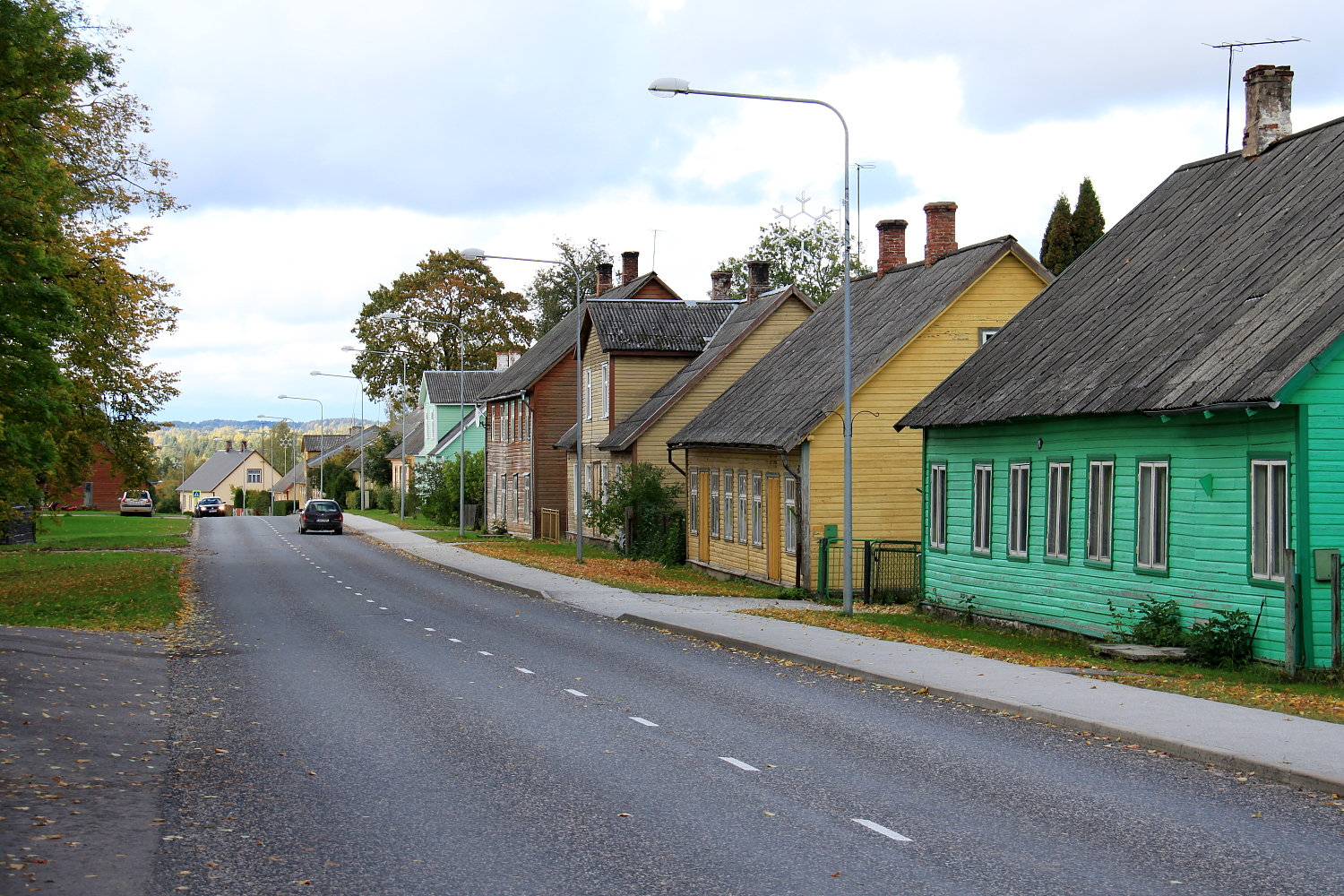
Street in Kanepi

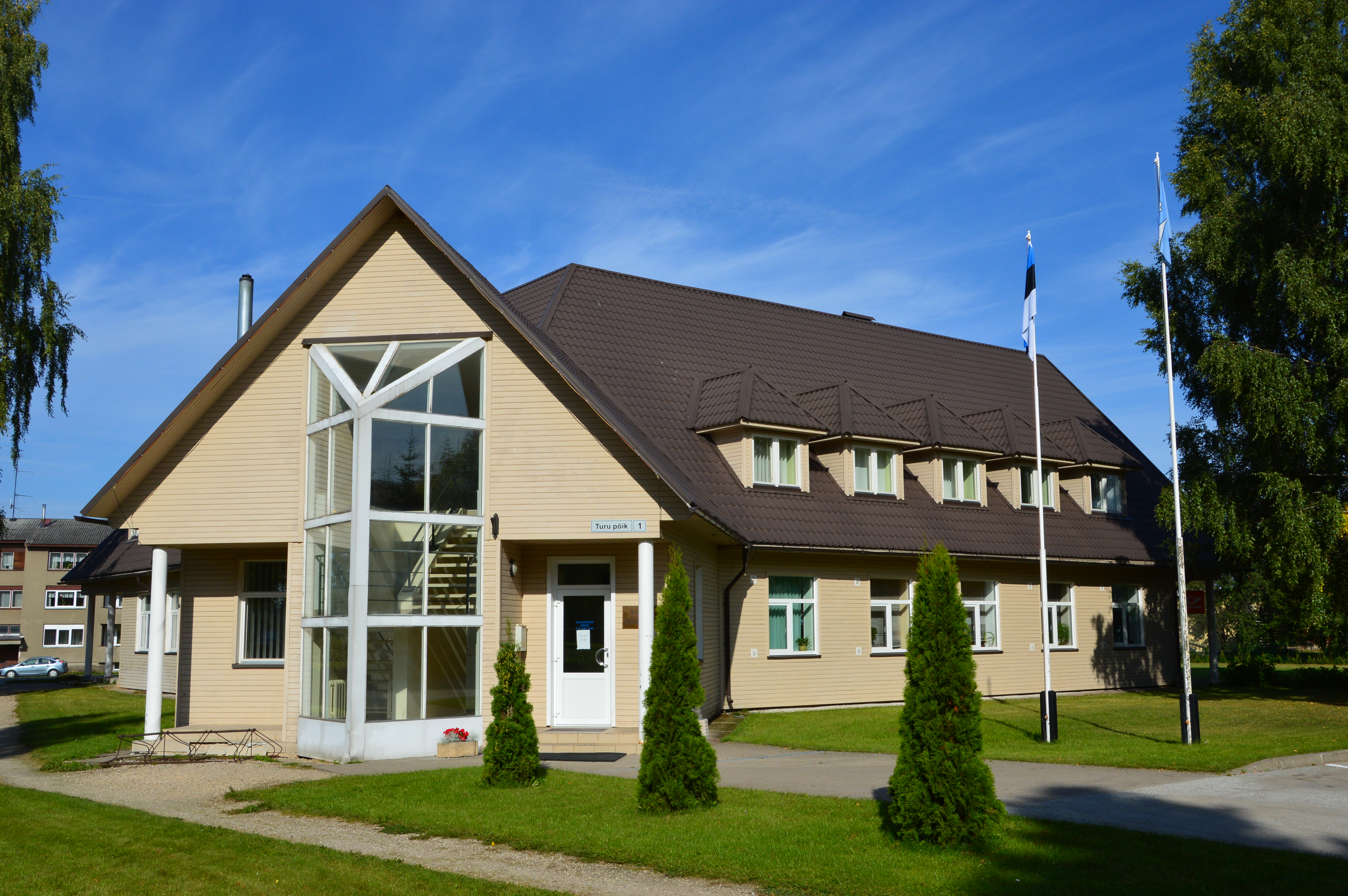
Kanepi town hall

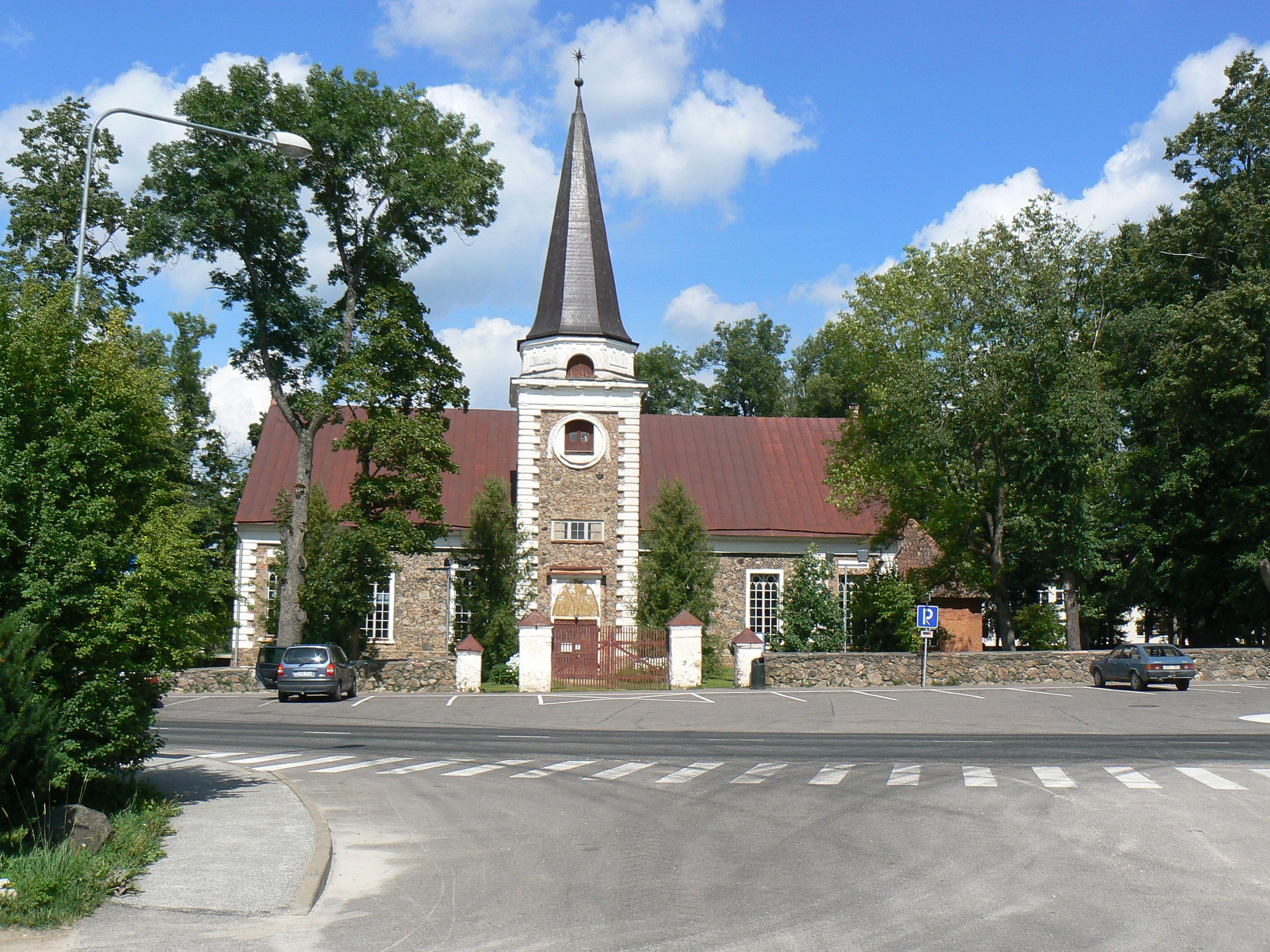
Kanepi church

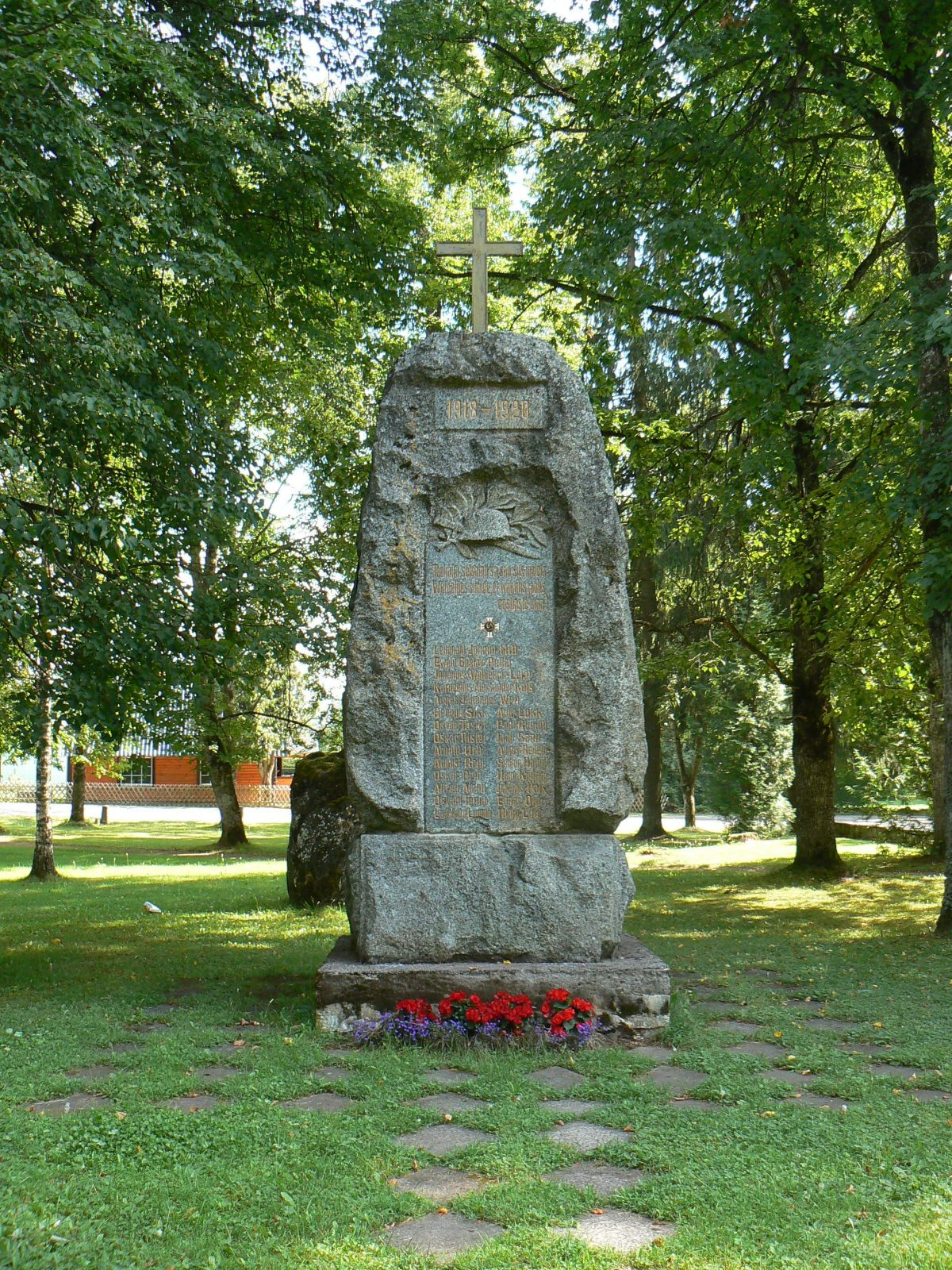
War of Independence memorial in Kanepi
