= Tallinn Mustamäe Secondary School =

School in Tallinn

Coordinates: 59°24′7.08″N 24°40′24.87″E

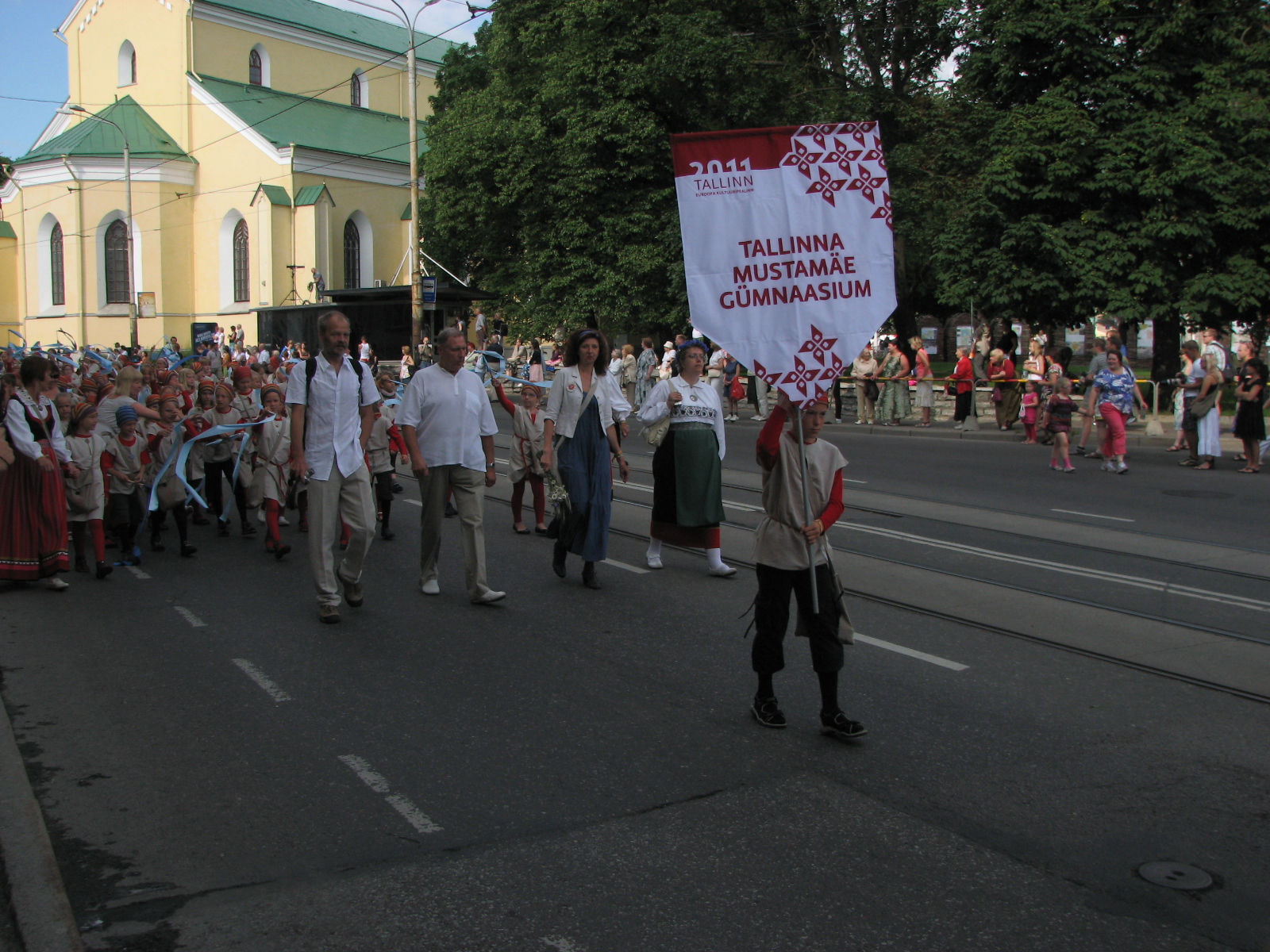
Tallinn Mustamäe Secondary School procession 2011

Tallinn Mustamäe Secondary School (Estonian: Tallinna Mustamäe Gümnaasium) is a school situated in the district of Mustamäe, Tallinn, Estonia which provides both primary and secondary education. The school opened on September 1, 1965 as Tallinna 44. Keskkool (Tallinn 44th High School). The current headmaster is Marika Randma.

== History ==
Tallinn Mustamäe Secondary School began its work as the first Estonian school in Mustamäe in September 1965. From 1965-1997, the school was officially called Tallinna 44. Keskkool. From the year of the school's founding, the curriculum has had a concentration in chemistry. The original building was built for 960 pupils but it soon became too small for the growing number of students attending Tallinn Mustamäe Secondary School School days took place in shifts for several years however there were still around 40 pupils per class. From 1992-2010, the primary level students used different buildings from the secondary level students. The main building at Keskuse street was renovated from 2004-2005 and remodeled in 2013/2014 and 2014/2015.

The first headmaster of Tallinn Mustamäe Secondary School was Ellen Kuum (1965-1983). She was followed by Valeri Aava (1983-1984). Kaidor Damberg, the current headmaster was appointed in 1984.

== Education ==
The school has three main fields of study. The students can choose to study in:

- the environment-nature class (from 1965) where the main emphasis is on biology, environmental studies, chemistry, geography and physics
- the language immersion class (from 1968) where the main emphasis is on English
- the language-STEM subjects immersion class (from 2001)

Tallinn Mustamäe Secondary School was one of the first adopters of the online school management system eKool in 2002. In 2008, the school started providing Chinese language classes.

== Extracurricular activities at TMG ==
The first ski day of the school took place already on December 22, 1965. In 1983/1984 the ski day event was held as a weekly winter sports event and it still takes place yearly.

== Awards ==
- 2001 – Õppimist väärtustav kool (School that values studying), Tallinna Haridusamet
- 2006 – Hea õpikeskkonnaga kool (Best learning environment), Tallinna Haridusamet
- 2011 – Healthy school canteen award, former first lady of Estonia, Evelin Ilves

== Alumni ==
The first alumni night took place in 1968. It was decided during this event that all future alumni reunions would take place on the first Saturday of February. Notable alumni include:

- Kersti Kaljulaid, fifth President of Estonia
- Marek Strandberg, politician
- Sten-Timmu Sokk, basketball player
- Tanel Sokk, basketball player
- Juku-Kalle Raid, journalist and poet
