= Smart-ID =

Online authentication system

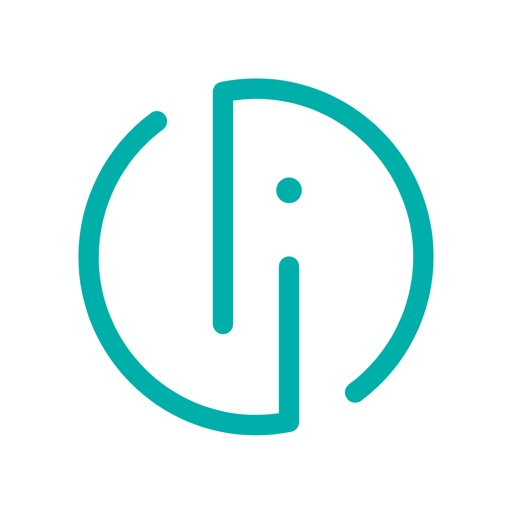

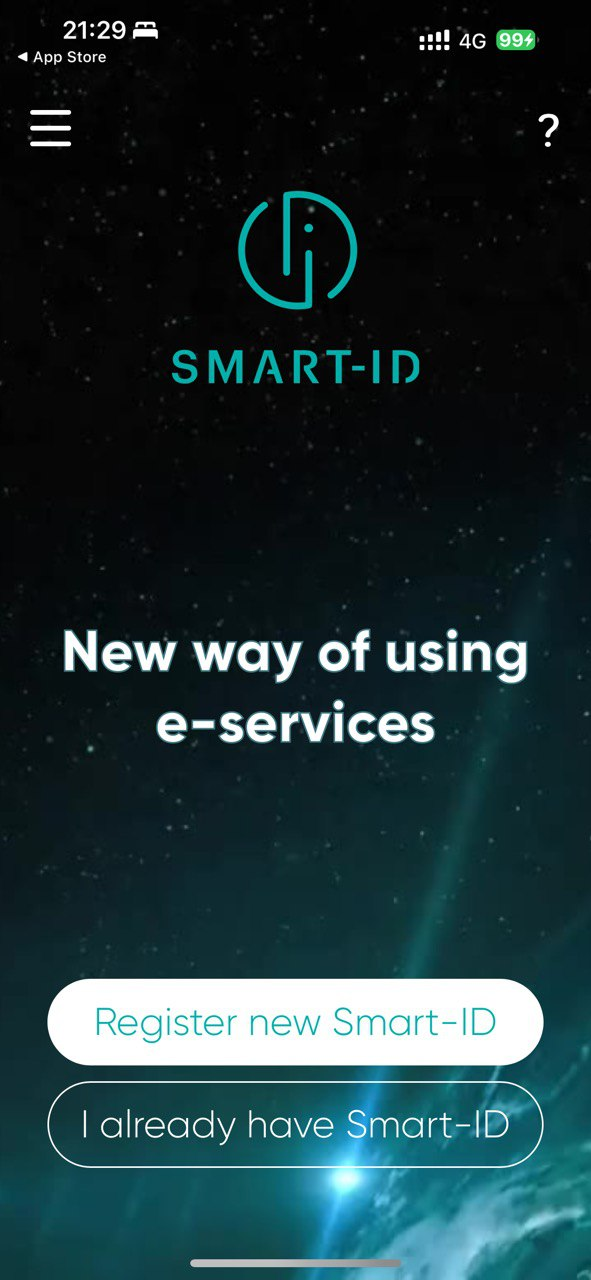
- Screenshot
- Release: November 2016; 10 years ago
- Operating system: Android, iOS, iPadOS, watchOS
- Available in: 8 languages
- List of languages English, Estonian, Latvian, Lithuanian, Russian, German, Dutch, French
- Website: www.smart-id.com

Smart-ID is an electronic authentication tool developed by SK ID Solutions, an Estonian company. Users can log in to various electronic services and sign documents with an electronic signature.

Smart-ID meets the European Union's eIDAS Regulation and the European Central Bank's standards for a secure authentication solution. Smart-ID is a Qualified Signature Creator Device (QSCD) that can issue a Qualified Electronic Signature (QES). The Smart-ID app is compatible with both iOS and Android devices and does not require a SIM card. By 2021, the Smart-ID application was launched in the Huawei AppGallery. As of May 2023, Smart-ID has 3,298,969 active users across the Baltic States (Latvia, Lithuania, and Estonia). Every month, the Smart-ID processes 79 million transactions. In March 2023, Smart-ID users made an exceptional 85 million transactions.

== History ==
In November 2016, SK ID Solutions debuted the Smart-ID tool for the first time at its annual conference. In February 2017, eKool, Starman, and Tallinn Kaubamaja Grupp were the first to implement Smart-ID authentication in their e-services. In March 2017, Smart-ID was added as an authentication option to SEB bank and Swedbank's online banking in all three Baltic States.

Dokobit, previously known as DigiDoc, began offering its clients the ability to use e-services using Smart-ID in April 2017. More than 100 service providers had implemented Smart-ID as an authentication solution for their services by November 2019.

At its annual conference on November 8, 2018, SK ID Solutions revealed that Smart-ID had been certified as compatible with the QSCD[8] level, the highest level of qualified electronic signature in the European Union, following a rigorous certification process. As a result, the Smart-QES-level ID's electronic signature, the digital counterpart of a handwritten signature, is now available to all users who have registered with the tool. This signature is accepted by all European Union member states.

On August 26, 2019, Estonian Information Systems Supervisory Authority experts reviewed Smart-ID (ISSA). Based on the methods provided in the eIDAS Regulation, the expert committee concluded that Smart-ID offers a high level of electronic identification assurance. SK ID Solutions and RIA struck an agreement in September 2019 that allows Smart-ID to authenticate Estonian state e-services via RIA's central authentication service, which is used by over 60 public authorities. Smart-ID accounts created three years ago have expired in January 2020. Therefore, renewing them and performing mandatory updates was necessary.

In February 2020, SK ID Solutions announced that Smart-ID could be used to give digital signatures in the national digital signature software DigiDoc4, which up until this moment was only possible with ID cards via Mobile-ID. Users must have at least version 4.2.4.71 or later of the DigiDoc4 software installed on their computers to use this feature.

Since February 2020, Smart-ID accounts can now be created with biometric information from an ID card or passport, but only by users who have previously used a Smart-ID account. Since October 2022, 13–17 years old minors in Lithuania are able to create a Smart-ID account using biometric information too. A parent or legal guardian must approve the registration. SK ID Solutions collaborated on the new solution with iProov from the United Kingdom and InnoValor from the Netherlands. TÜV Informationstechnik GmbH, a German certification company, assessed it.

Since May 2023, Smart-ID can be used to submit company's annual reports in Estonia and digitally sign anything in the e-business register using your PIN2.

== Overview ==
The Smart-ID app is available for download on Google Play and Apple's App Store. Android 4.4 and iOS 11 are the oldest supported operating system versions for Smart-ID. Smart-ID works on the premise of two-factor authentication, combining an intelligent device (something the user owns) with PINs (something the user knows). A new user must first authenticate themselves with an ID card or a mobile phone number and then confirm a PIN1 and PIN2 code, either manually or automatically produced. The first PIN is used to authenticate a person's identity when accessing e-banking or e-services, while the second PIN is used to support electronic signatures and authenticate transactions (e.g., transfers). The PIN1 code must be four digits long, while the PIN2 code must be five digits long. To log in to an e-service, the user must use Smart-ID as the authentication method and enter their unique Smart-ID user ID. A notification will open on the user's smart device where the software is installed and display a verification code. If the code matches the code presented to the user by the e-service, then the user can confirm the match by entering their PIN1 code. The user must verify the action with their PIN2 code when giving digital signatures. A Smart-ID account is valid for three years. The report can be updated, changed, and deleted at any given time, free of charge. Smart-ID is available in five languages: Estonian, Latvian, Lithuanian, Russian, and English.

An international survey conducted in 2021 revealed that Smart-ID is the most reliable authentication solution in Baltic countries. In January 2023, the number of times Smart-ID was used to access State Authentication Service (TARA) in Estonia has surpassed those of Mobile-ID and ID-cards for the first time since July 2022.

== Security ==
Smart-ID is based on Cybernetica's SplitKey authentication and digital signature platform technology, for which the company has filed a patent application. Public key cryptography, digital signature methods, and critical public infrastructures are all used in the technology. The user's PIN is not saved on the device and is only needed to decrypt the private key in the Smart-ID app. When the user inputs the PIN, the private key is cracked, and the answer is transmitted to the Smart-ID server, where a portion of the key given by the app is joined with the server's encrypted key. The app will block the user from accessing it for three hours if they input the incorrect PIN three times in a row. If this happens once again, the app will lock for 24 hours. If this happens a third time, the account will be permanently disabled. PINs cannot be changed or recovered once an account has been created. The user must create a new account if the account is permanently blocked. Smart-ID uses the Apple and Google messaging networks to notify the app when new data is saved on its servers.

== Phishing ==
In February 2019, unknown criminals attempted to create Smart-ID accounts with stolen IDs obtained via phishing customers' text messages and website addresses, according to a monthly report by the Estonian Information System Manager in April 2019. The Latvian Information Technology Security Incident Assessment Body Cert was also notified of these intrusions on March 1. Fraudsters sent emails to potential victims pretending to be bank representatives. The mails linked users to a phishing page after redirecting them to a phony bank login page. Victims were asked to log in using their identification information and PIN1 code. The fraudsters then began the process of generating a new Smart-ID account. As a result, the victim had to input a PIN2 number, which permitted the fraudster to finish setting up a new tab with the victim's personal information. Fraudsters in Estonia were able to log in to multiple e-services utilizing Smart-ID using a Smart-ID account and the victim's data. On behalf of the victims, fraudsters also employed online banking services. Later, the Estonian Information System Manager identified several victims, some of whom had also experienced financial losses. The Estonian Information System Manager requested a full report on the event from SK ID Solutions. The organization opted not to criticize the corporation after receiving the information, although it did propose that the procedure of creating Smart-ID accounts be reviewed. According to the Estonian Banking Association, Estonian banks have not discontinued using Smart-ID and do not think it is required. Smart-ID was exposed to a thorough review process in September 2019 to determine this authentication instrument's level of security. Reviewers discovered no flaws, and SK ID Solutions and the Estonian Information System Manager signed a contract. Estonia later introduced Smart-ID and other authentication mechanisms to the central public services portal.
