= EKool =

Estonian school management system

eKool is a school management system used in Estonia covering 90% of the nation's school network connecting all the pupils, parents and teachers involved. It is estimated that this application is used by 28-30% of Estonians in total. The name eKool means eSchool in Estonian.

The system is usable for teachers, pupils and parents to exchange information about time tables, grades, homework assignments and other similar features. eKool was created in 2002 by Look@World foundation in cooperation with companies from the private sector. It was originally designed to meet the requirements of four test schools: Rocca Al Mare School, Jüri Gymnasium, Kuressaare Gymnasium and Tallinn Arte Gymnasium. Since then it has grown to cover 90% of Estonian school network.

== History ==
eKool started in 2002 to replace printed school diaries by digital journals which would enable parents and students to see their grades and homework assignments online. The pilot project was launched by the specifications of 4 schools: Rocca Al Mare School, Jüri Gymnasium, Kuressaare Gymnaasium and Tallinn Arte Gymnasium. The initial Look@World program ended in 2005 after which it was turned into a private company: Koolitööde AS. In the next few years the eKool mostly expanded over the Estonian school system reaching over 420 schools by 2012.

Since 2014 eKool is also supported by mobile application which allows students and parents to access their information from mobile phones. However schools and teachers still need to use a computer.

== Functionalities ==
eKool can be accessed by combination of user-name and password, Estonian ID-card, Estonian Mobile-ID, Smart-ID or through online bank identification. eKool can be used by various interest groups: school personnel, students, parents and to some extent the local government overseeing their own school's. With one user account a person can access functionalities for different user groups where the user belongs to.

The schools personnel carries out most of the data entry process to eKool which latter can be used by all parties that have right to access the information. Among the information schools provide are:

- E-Journal
- Timetable
- Lesson topics and homework
- Grades
- Absences of students
- Notifications of school events and news

The parents and the students can access the information and keep themselves up to date. From their own side they make it easy for the school to collect contact information because parents and students enter it themselves and keep eKool updated by using it.
