= Eugenio Giraldoni =

Italian opera singer (1871–1924)

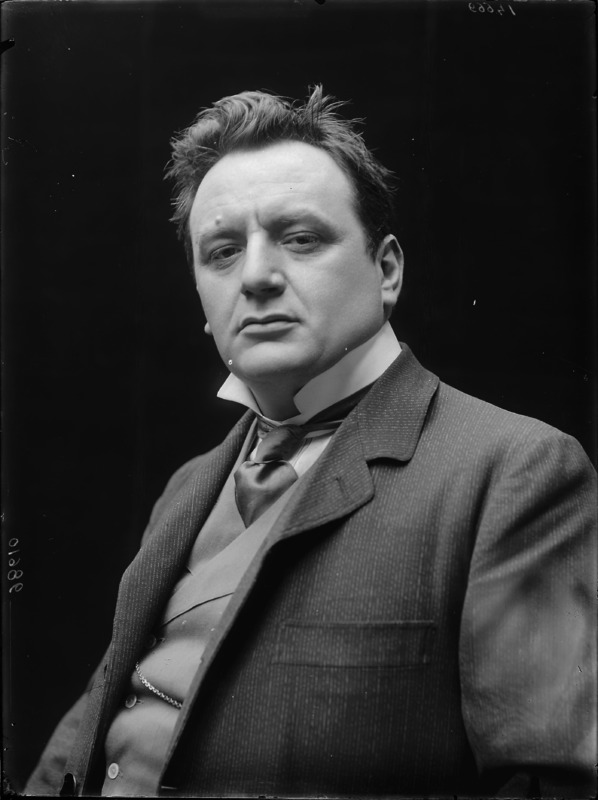
Eugenio Giraldoni

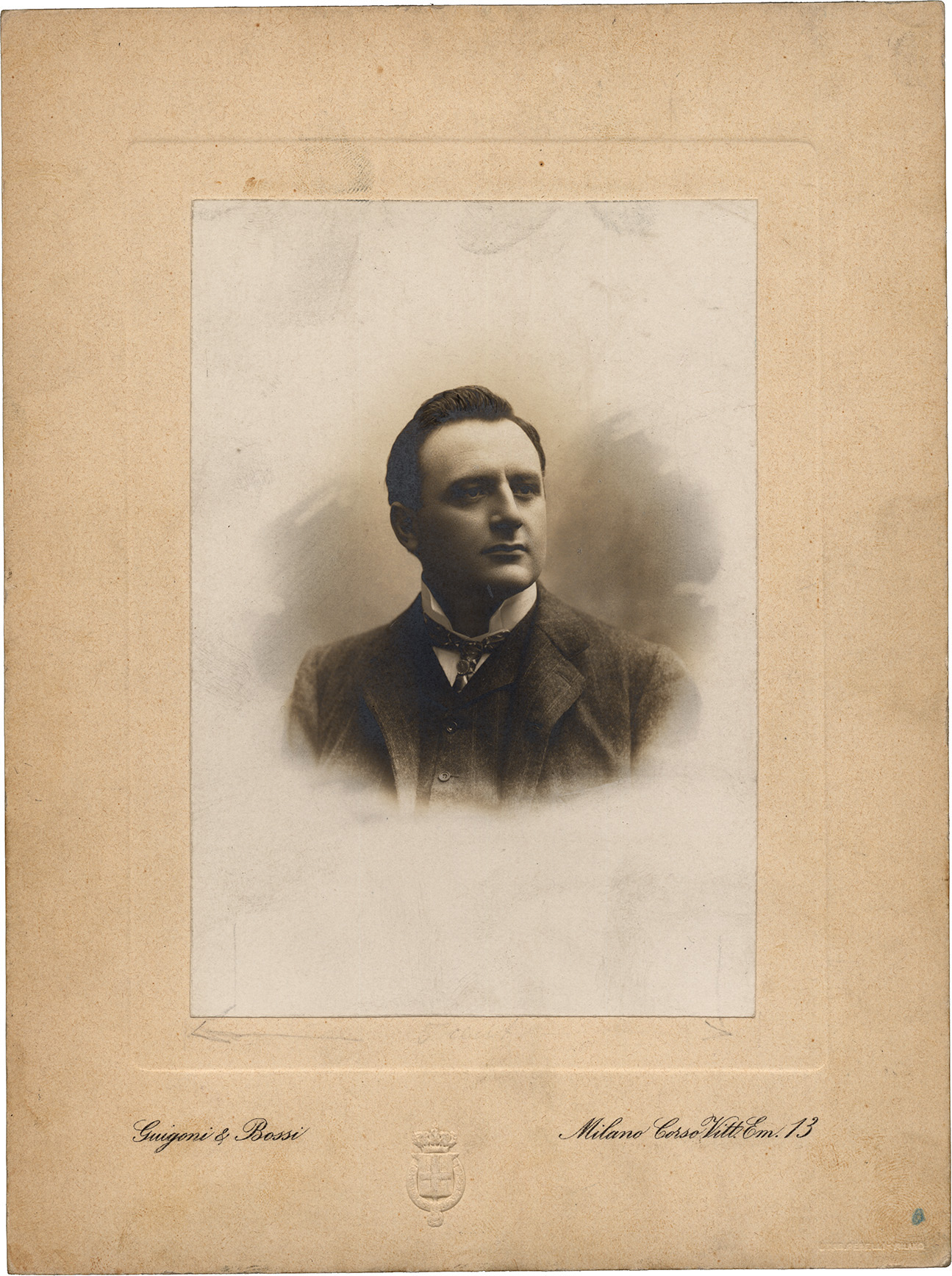
Portrait of Eugenio Giraldoni, baritone (1871-1924). Photo by Guigoni & Bossi, Milano, before 1924.

Eugenio Giraldoni (20 May 1871, Marseille – 23 June 1924, Helsinki) was an Italian operatic baritone who enjoyed a substantial international career. In 1900, he created the role of Baron Scarpia in Giacomo Puccini's Tosca.

He was the son of another leading baritone, Leone Giraldoni, and the soprano and violinist Carolina Ferni. His mother gave him voice lessons and he made his opera debut in Barcelona, as Escamillo in Carmen, in 1891.

Giraldoni consolidated his career by appearing at various operatic venues in Italy and, in 1898, visiting South America. Then, in 1900, he earned a place in operatic history when he created the part of Baron Scarpia in Tosca, at the Teatro Costanzi in Rome. He also appeared in the first performance of Alberto Franchetti's La figlia di Jorio at Italy's foremost opera house, La Scala, Milan, in 1906.

He sang in Russia and Poland from 1901 until 1907 and at the Metropolitan Opera in New York City during the 1904–05 season. In 1913, he appeared at the Opéra-Comique in Paris, as Scarpia and Sharpless.

Giraldoni had a dark, resonant voice and a strong (if unsubtle) stage presence, according to contemporary descriptions of his performances. Apart from Scarpia, his notable roles included: Don Carlo, Amonasro, Telramund, Hamlet, Berlioz's Méphisto and Onegin. But like his direct rival, the Sicilian baritone Mario Sammarco, Giraldoni's vehement style of singing was best suited to operas by verismo composers such as Ruggero Leoncavallo, who composed Pagliacci, Umberto Giordano, who composed Andrea Chénier, and Alberto Franchetti, who composed Germania and Cristoforo Colombo.

After World War I, Giraldoni sang on the Italian provincial-theatre circuit. He retired from the stage in Trieste in 1921 and died three years later in Finland, where he had gone to teach. His last operatic appearance had been as the Father in Louise.

Giraldoni made a number of recordings prior to World War I, some of which have been reissued on CD.

== Sources ==
- Le guide de l'opéra, Mancini & Rouveroux, (Fayard, 1986);
- The Record of Singing, Michael Scott, (Duckworth, 1977).
