= Leone Giraldoni =

Italian opera singer (1824–1897)

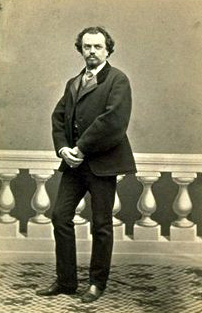
Leone Giraldoni, photographed circa 1865

Leone Giraldoni (born 4 July 1824, Paris – died 19 September 1897, Moscow) was a celebrated Italian operatic baritone. He created the title roles of Gaetano Donizetti's Il duca d'Alba (1882) and Verdi's Simon Boccanegra (1857) as well as the role of Renato in Verdi's Un ballo in maschera (1859).

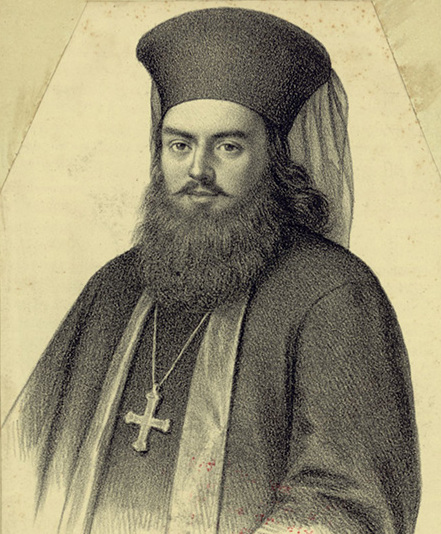
Portrait of Leone Giraldoni

Giraldoni studied in Florence with Luigi Ronzi and made his début as the High Priest in Pacini's Saffo (Lodi, 1847). He made his La Scala début as Il Conte di Luna in Il trovatore in 1850 and during his long career sang throughout Europe with considerable success. His final performance was in Filippo Marchetti's Don Giovanni d'Austria at Rome's Teatro Costanzi in 1885.

After his retirement he taught voice and singing, first in Milan, and from 1891 at the Moscow Conservatory. He was the author of two works on singing:

- Guida teorico-pratica ad uso dell'artista-cantante, Bologna, 1864 (with a revised and expanded edition published in 1884)
- Compendium, Metodo analitico, filosofico e fisiologico per la educazione della voce, Milan, Ricordi, 1889.

Contemporary accounts describe his voice as warm, smooth and evenly produced. He also was considered to be an effective actor, with a noble and dignified stage presence and beautiful phrasing, qualities which made him one of Verdi's favourite baritones.

With style and technical skill, Giraldoni performed the then demanding new works of Verdi, as well as the existing bel canto operatic repertoire.

== Personal life ==
Giraldoni was married to the well-known soprano and violinist Carolina Ferni. Their son, Eugenio Giraldoni (1870–1924), became a leading baritone like his father. In Rome in 1900, Eugenio created the role of Baron Scarpia in Puccini's Tosca.
