= Tallinn Lasnamae Russian School =

School in Tallinn

- Ласнамяэская Русская Гимназия

Location
- Koorti 23; Tallinn; Estonia
- Coordinates: 59.4426°N 24.8358°E

Information
- Type: Public
- Opened: 1 September 1981
- Grades: 1–12
- Age: 6 to 19
- Language: Russian (main language)
- Website: laveg.edu.ee

Tallinn Lasnamäe Russian Gymnasium (Estonian: Tallinna Lasnamäe Vene Gümnaasium) is a public school in Tallinn, Estonia. Established in 1981, it was first named school No 48 and opened its doors to 889 students. The school's first director was Irina Ivanovna Opekina.

From 2011 to 2013, the school participated in the international cultural project "Comenius" (Speaking.....of culture – Kultuuridest rääkimine).

In 2013 the school passed the government check, the results were good.

== Top Schools in Estonia ==
The school scored 60.3 points in the ranking of Top Schools in Estonia in 2010.

== After School Activities ==
- Estonian
- Girls Choir
- Boys Choir
- Musical Ensemble
- Drama Class
- Robotics Class
- Chess Class
