= Anton Õunapuu =

Estonian teacher and scouts movement personnel

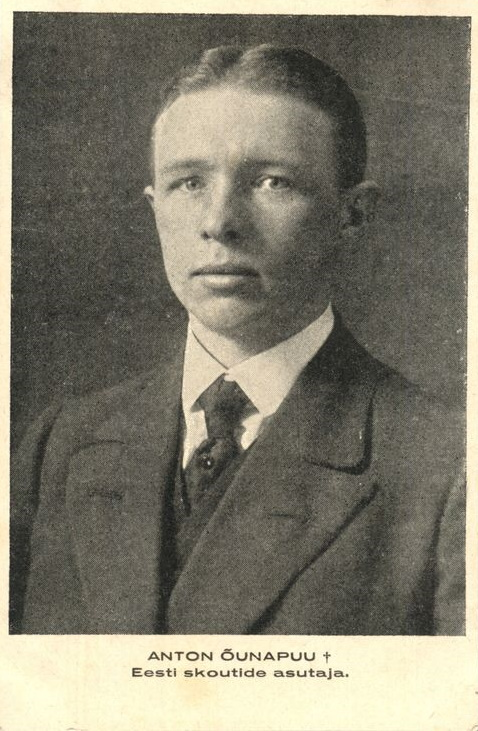
Anton Õunapuu in 1918

Anton Õunapuu VR II/3 (7 November 1887 – 2 April 1919) was an Estonian PE teacher, soldier, and the founder of the scouting movement (Estonian: Eesti skaudiliikumine) in Estonia.

== Early life and work as a PE teacher ==
Anton Õunapuu was born as a son of a farmer near Vändra in 1887. He started his studies in Vaki Municipality School (1897–1901) and graduatuated from Vändra Parish School in 1903. Studied in the Gymnastics Institute of University of Helsinki with the support of Estonian Sports Association Kalev. He graduated in 1913 and returned to Estonia.

From 1913 until 1918 he worked as a PE teacher in numerous schools in Tallinn, most notably in Tallinn Secondary School of Science (Tallinna Reaalkool) and in Tallinn Secondary School of Commerce (Tallinna Kommertskool).

The first Boy Scout squads in Estonia were formed during 1916 in these schools, mainly due to the work of Anton Õunapuu. From these squads the first Tallinn Troop of Boy Scouts was formed.

== Before and during the Estonian War of Independence ==
In 1917 Õunapuu formed a Student Home Guard Squad, which consisted of 340 of his students, of which 82 were boy scouts. Õunapuu's squad protected Estonian Salvation Committee on 24 February 1918 during the proclamation of Estonian Independence. During the German Occupation Õunapuu organized an underground squad of Estonian Defence League. On 16 December 1918 he was promoted to serve as the commander of the pioneer company of Kalevlaste Malev. He was wounded in the battle of Järveküla, near Narva.

== Death ==
Anton Õunapuu fell in the battles for Petseri County on 2 April 1919. He was posthumously awarded Cross of Liberty (Grade II, Class 3) - "For Personal Courage". He was buried to Vändra Cemetery on 9 April 1919.
