= Blevio =

Blevio Biev (Lombard)
- Comune
- Comune di Blevio
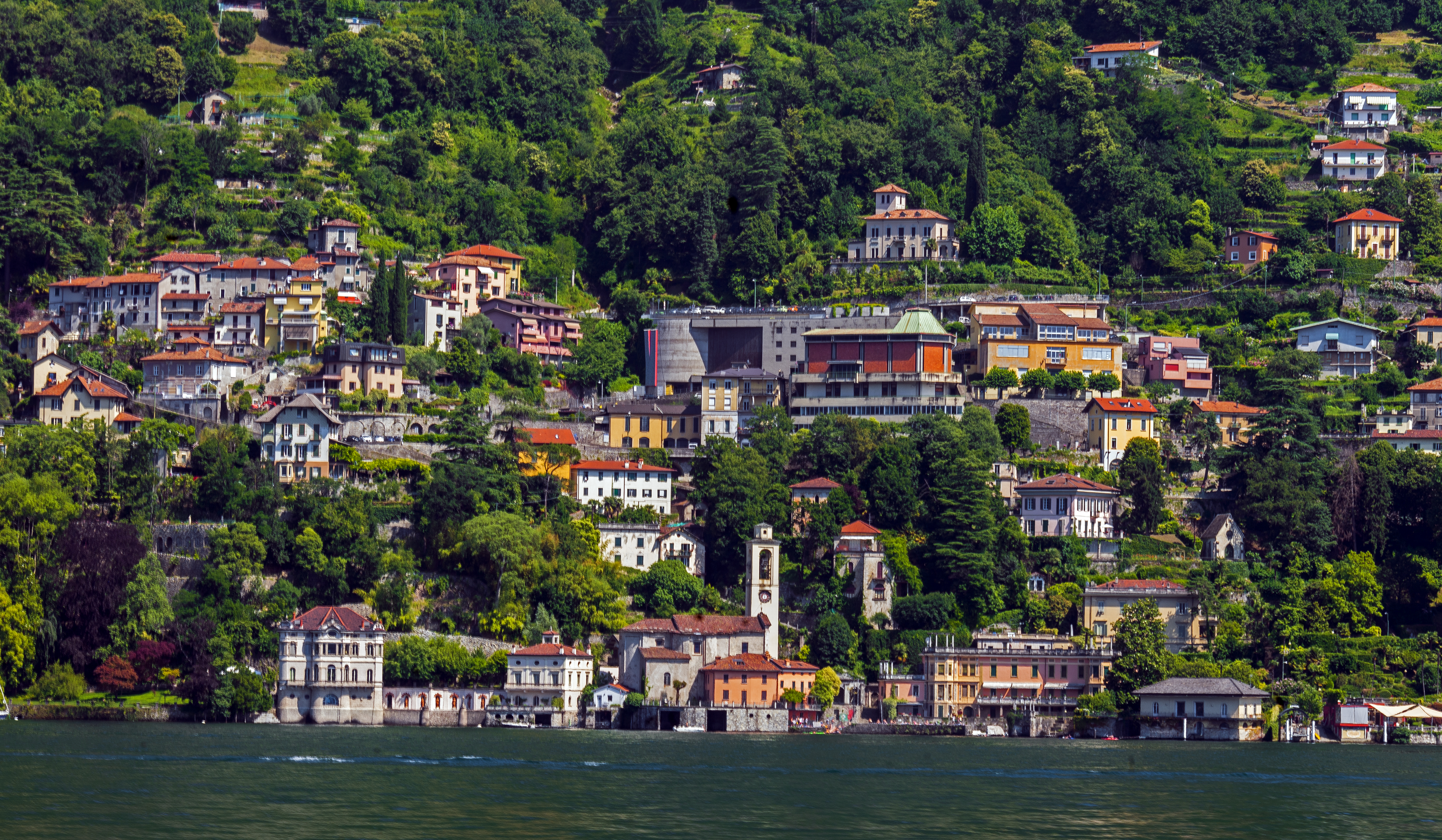
- Central Blevio seen from the lake

- Coat of arms

- Location within Italy Location within Lombardy
- Coordinates: 45.8389°N 9.1024°E
- Country: Italy
- Region: Lombardy
- Province: Como (CO)

Government
  - Mayor: Alberto Trabucchi

Area
  - Total: 5.47 km^{2} (2.11 sq mi)
- Elevation: 231 m (758 ft)

Population (31 December 2025)
  - Total: 1,002
  - Density: 183/km^{2} (474/sq mi)
- Demonym: Bleviani
- Time zone: UTC+1 (CET)
  - Summer (DST): UTC+2 (CEST)
- Postal code: 22020
- Dialing code: 031
- Website: Official website

Blevio (Comasco: Biev [ˈbjeːf]) is a comune (municipality) in the Province of Como in the Italian region Lombardy. It is situated approximately 40 kilometres (25 mi) north of Milan and 2 kilometres (1 mi) northeast of Como, overlooking the eastern shore of Lake Como from hilly slopes that rise from an elevation of 200 metres (660 ft).

Blevio shares borders with the municipalities of Brunate, Como, and Torno.

== History ==
The comune of Blevio comprises seven hamlets, traditionally known as "the seven cities": Capovico, Cazzanore, Girola, Meggianico, Mezzovico, Sopravilla, and Sorto. The municipal territory spans a significant altimetric range, extending from 200 to 1,140 metres (660 to 3,740 ft) above sea level.

The etymology of the town's name likely originates from the Celto-Ligurian Biuelius (cognate with the Latin vivo – alive, Welsh byw, and Old Irish biu).

In 1497, Ludovico Sforza, Duke of Milan, granted the fief of Blevio and several neighboring villages to Ludovica Crivelli. In the following centuries, Blevio maintained close ties with the city of Como and eventually became a fief of the Tanzi family, a patrician house whose wealth derived from the silk industry. Count Antonio von Tanzi Blevio, who was ennobled by the Habsburgs for his banking contributions, commissioned a grand villa upon the cliffs of Perlasca, now part of the neighboring town of Torno. In 1798, the villa and the village passed to the Taverna and Borromeo families—two of the most influential houses of the Milanese aristocracy—before Blevio was established as a free town following the Napoleonic era. A minor branch of the Tanzi family, titled Edler von Tanzi, retained extensive landholdings in Blevio and Torno until the early 20th century.

During the 19th century, Blevio became a favored retreat for the European elite. The renowned ballerina Marie Taglioni acquired a romantic lakefront residence, Villa Taglioni, while her companion, Prince Aleksander Trubetskoy, constructed a spectacular villa nearby. Blevio was incorporated into the Kingdom of Sardinia in 1859 and subsequently the Kingdom of Italy in 1861. Its numerous historic lakefront villas continue to host a variety of Italian and international public figures.

=== Hydrogeological instability and reconstruction ===
Since 2021, Blevio has suffered from recurring instances of hydrogeological instability. In July 2021, intense rainfall triggered mudflows and landslides that isolated hamlets and blocked the Lariana road. This was followed by similar flash flooding in August 2023, and a major emergency in September 2025, which saw the overflowing of Lake Como and further landslides submerging infrastructure. These events have left the municipality in a deteriorated state, with structural damage to private residences and public facilities. The local road network is significantly compromised, exhibiting extensive cracking and numerous potholes. As of April 2026, many construction and stabilization sites remain active throughout the town; restoration efforts are projected to continue through 2027.
