= Gustav Adolf Grammar School =

Gymnasium in Tallinn, Estonia

Coordinates: 59.439912°N 24.743174°E

- Gustav Adolfi Gümnaasium
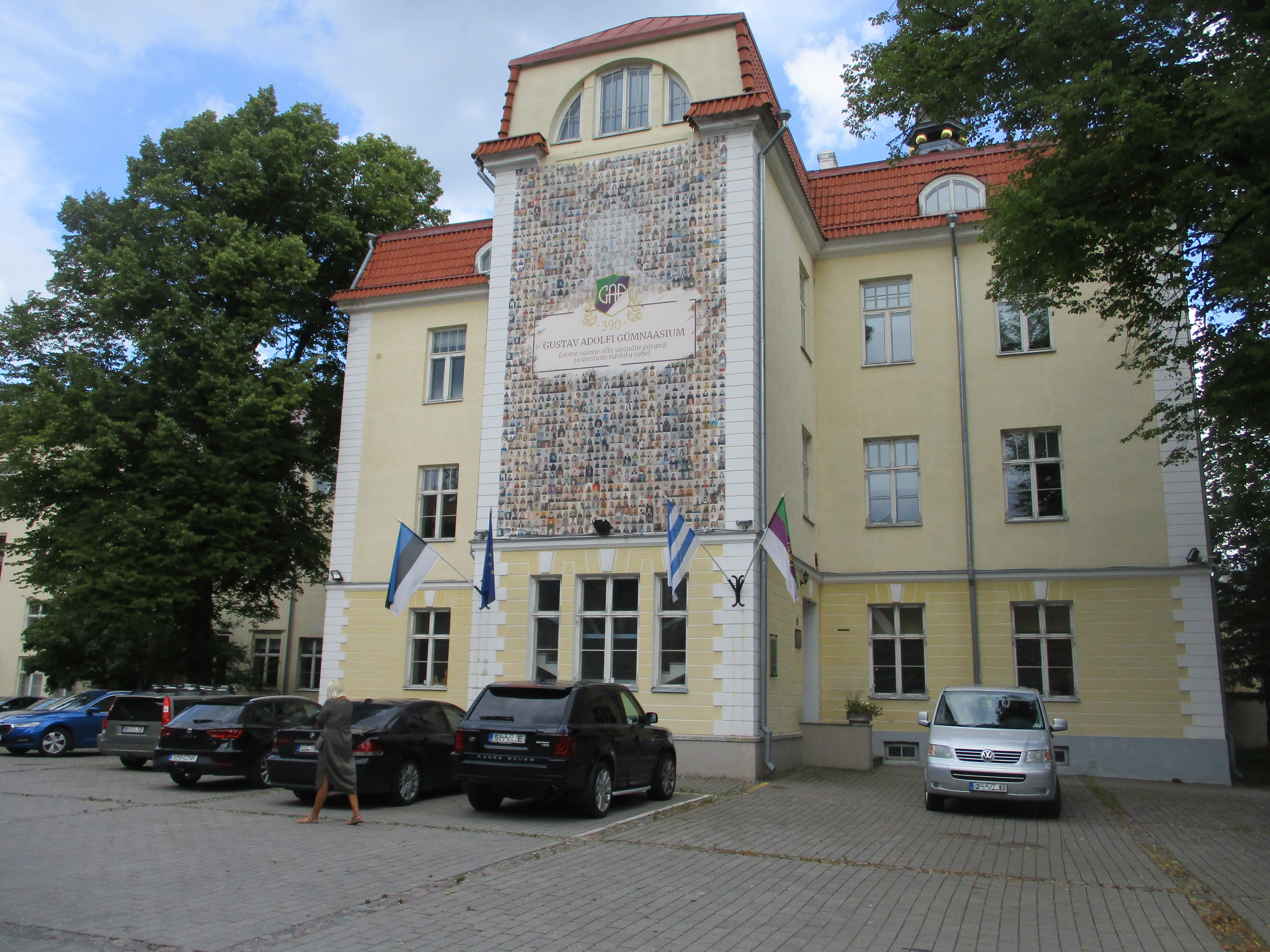
- The main building of the Gustav Adolf Grammar School decorated in 2021 for anniversary with small portraits of all students

Location
- Suur-Kloostri 16; Tallinn, Harjumaa, 10133; Estonia

Information
- Type: Public
- Motto: Vanim, vaimne, väärikas (Oldest, spiritual, dignified)
- Established: 16 February 1631; 395 years ago
- Founder: Gustav II Adolf
- Principal: Henrik Salum
- Grades: 1–12
- Enrollment: 1,530
- Colors: Green, purple, blue, white
- Nickname: GAG
- National ranking: 3rd
- Website: www.gag.ee

The Gustav Adolf Grammar School is a secondary school in Tallinn, Estonia. Swedish king Gustavus Adolphus established it as the Reval Gymnasium in 1631. It is one of the oldest extant secondary schools in Europe.

== History ==
=== 1631–1651 ===
King Gustavus Adolphus founded the school as the Reval Gymnasium. Until 1645 it consisted of four forms: quarta, tertia, secunda and prima, in ascending order. The teaching staff consisted of four professors and two colleagues (teachers of quarta and tertia). Pupils were taught rhetoric, poetry, Greek, Latin, and Ancient Hebrew languages, mathematics, theology, history etc.

== Architecture ==
The school buildings were originally constructed in the 13th century as a nunnery. Later the buildings has been rebuilt and expanded on. The latest renovation, completed in 1999, was intended to recover its historical appearance and value. The school is adjacent to the 13th century Tallinn Old Town city wall, which gives the whole complex a unique historic atmosphere and beauty.

== Education ==
Today, the school provides both primary and secondary education. In the secondary stage (gymnasium) students can choose between natural sciences, Swedish, English-Mathematics and English-French direction.

== Notable faculty ==
- Alfred Rosenberg (1893–1946) was a short-term teacher at the gymnasium during the German occupation of Estonia in 1918.
