= Andrea Bellini (singer) =

Italian opera singer

- Occupation: Italian operatic bass

Andrea Bellini was an Italian operatic bass who had an active career performing in Italy's major opera houses from the 1840s to the 1870s. He specialized in the buffo repertoire and was most often heard in comprimario roles.

== Career ==
From 1843 to 1853, 1856–1858, and 1866–1872, Bellini was committed to La Fenice in Venice. At that house he performed in several world premieres, including Samuele Levi's Giuditta (1844, Mindo), Giuseppe Verdi's Ernani (1844, Jago), Giovanni Galzerani's Giovanna Maillotte (1848), Galzerani's La vivandiera (1848), Antonio Buzzolla's Elisabetta di Valois (1850, Count di Lerme), Francesco Malipiero's Fernando Cortez (1851, Don Alfonso), Verdi's Rigoletto (1851, Count Ceprano), Giovanni Felis' Hermosa (1851), Carlo Ercole Bosoni's La prigioniera (1853, Inigo), Antonio Monticini's Aladino (1853, Uberto), Verdi's La traviata (1853, Dottore Grenvil), Verdi's Simon Boccanegra (1857, Pietro), and Serafino Amedeo De Ferrari's Il matrimonio per concorso (1858, Anselmo). He sang at the Teatro Regio di Parma in 1854–1855. He also worked as a guest artist at the Teatro di San Carlo in Naples.
