= Vincenzo Negrini =

Italian opera singer (1804–1840)

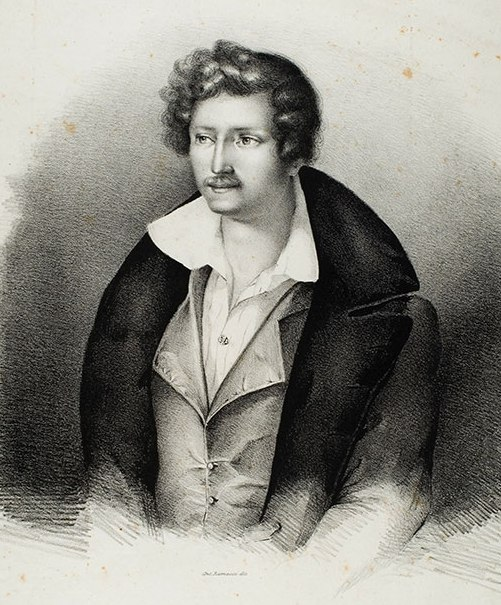
Lithograph of Vincenzo Negrini, c. 1835

Vincenzo Negrini (born Vincenzo Bartolomeo Trentanove) (24 August 1804 – 16 August 1840) was an Italian bass-baritone opera singer. Born in Cesena, he sang leading bass and baritone roles in Italy's major opera houses and created several roles in early 19th-century operas, most notably Oroveso in Bellini's Norma and Folco in Donizetti's Ugo, conte di Parigi. Severe heart disease caused him to retire from the stage in June 1840. He died in Milan two months later at the age of 35.

== Life and career ==
Negrini was born in 1804 in Cesena, Italy, a city in the Emilia-Romagna region of Italy. He was the second of the four children of Luigi Trentanove and Maria née Negrini from whom he later took his stage name. He studied singing in Bologna, and began his stage career at a young age. His earliest recorded performances were during the 1826 carnival season at the Teatro Comunitativo in Ravenna, where he appeared in Mercadante's opera Didone abbandonata and Rossini's Semiramide.

During the next four years he sang in various smaller provincial theatres in Italy but also appeared at the Teatro Apollo in Rome in Mercadante's Caritea, regina di Spagna and Rossini's Eduardo e Cristina and at the Teatro Alfieri in Florence where he created the role of Rolando in Luigi Maria Viviani's L'amore in guerra. By early 1831 he had been engaged by the Teatro Ducale in Parma where he sang in four operas, including Rossini's Matilde di Shabran and Le comte Ory. In December of that year he appeared at La Scala in Milan, singing the role of Oroveso in the world premiere of Bellini's Norma and subsequently appeared there in several more operas during the 1832 season, including the world premiere of Donizetti's Ugo, conte di Parigi singing the role of Folco.

Following the 1832 La Scala season he sang regularly in other major Italian opera houses of the day, including the Teatro San Benedetto in Venice, the Teatro Regio in Turin, and the Teatro Carlo Felice in Genoa. In 1837 he also appeared in Vienna at the Kärntnertortheater in the title role of Belisario, as Enrico Ashton in Lucia di Lammermoor, and as Filippo in Beatrice di Tenda. His last stage appearances were at the Teatro Carlo Felice in 1840 where he sang Enrico Ashton in Lucia di Lammermoor, the title role in Nicolai's Il templario, and Conte Sentinelli in the world premiere of Alessandro Nini's Cristina di Svezia. After the performances of Cristina di Svezia in June 1840, Negrini retired from the stage, gravely ill with heart disease.

During the last months of his life Negrini lived with the Dufour family in Milan while being treated at the sanatorium which they had founded in 1830. He died there on 16 August 1840 a few days before his 36th birthday. His funeral took place at the Church of San Vittore Grande accompanied by a military band and choristers from La Scala. His friend and fellow baritone, Luigi Goffredo Zuccoli, read the eulogy over his grave in the nearby Porta Vercellina cemetery. Francesco Regli wrote of Zuccoli's eulogy in the journal Il Pirata:

He was weeping ... and everyone was weeping with him ... I too was weeping ... I weep even as I write this ... I do not know when my tears will cease!

== Roles created ==
- Rolando in L'amore in guerra by Luigi Maria Viviani, Teatro Alfieri, Florence, 8 February 1829
- Oroveso in Norma by Vincenzo Bellini, La Scala, Milan, 26 December 1831
- Folco in Ugo, conte di Parigi by Gaetano Donizetti, La Scala, Milan, 13 March 1832
- Barone Ernesto di Rowelden in L'incognito by Pietro Campiuti, Teatro della Canobbiana, Milan, 13 June 1832
- Lodrisio in Marco Visconti by Nicola Vaccai, Teatro Regio, Turin, 27 January 1838
- Conte Sentinelli in Cristina di Svezia by Alessandro Nini, Teatro Carlo Felice, Genoa, 6 June 1840
