= Giacomo Panizza =

Italian composer and conductor

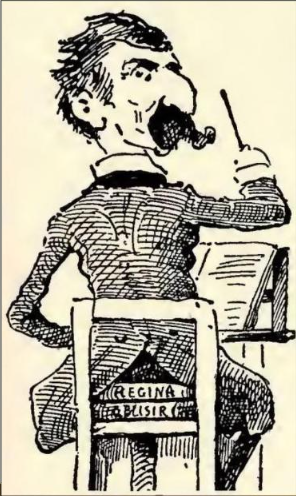
Caricature of Maestro Panizza

Giacomo Panizza (27 March 1804 – 1 May 1860) was the Maestro al Cembalo at La Scala, Milan, and conductor at the Covent Garden Theatre, London. He was born in Castellazzo Bormida and died in Milan. He is primarily noted for the ballet Faust, composed for La Scala with choreography by Jules Perrot. Faust became a popular ballet in Europe, especially in Saint Petersburg. He also fathered Achille Panizza, who was another well-known conductor.

== Early life and education ==
Panizza was baptized Giacomo Maria Panizza to Francesco Maria Panizza and Anna Maria Merli. He was the fifth child in his family. His family lived in the Piazza San Martino in Castellazzo Bormida. He attended the college of Alessandria to study literature and philosophy. At fifteen, he began to study with the organist at his church in San Martino. Eventually, he would be led to study counterpoint with Casimiro Chiesa, choirmaster of the cathedral of San Marco in Alessandria. In 1824, he became a pupil of Vincenzo Lavigna, the teacher of Giuseppe Verdi.

== Career ==
For some time, Panizza worked as the assistant to Cesare Pugni, the current Maestro al Cembalo. When Pugni had to flee Milan from his creditors, Panizza took over his position and in 1834 became Maestro al Cembalo. Panizza incurred criticism from composers such as Gaetano Donizetti and Vincenzo Bellini for altering works performed at La Scala. In 1842, Panizza responded to the complaints in the newspaper, Il Pirata. "..If Mr. Donizetti believes the writer guilty of past and future alterations to scores of his own or others, he will admit the answer, that if this is a vice, it will be that of the Maestro at the harpsichord and not of Maestro Panizza. Attributable to the place and not to the person, but rather desired by theatrical circumstances, not by the Maestro's vainglory (...). The Maestro does the best he knows and can do in the different cases, (.... to obtain the best execution and the best possible effect."

Panizza also taught vocal lessons to subsidise his income. His most famous pupil was the tenor Carlo Guasco. In 1831, he premiered his first opera, La Collerica at La Scala. His operas were not major successes. He also wrote nationalist Italian songs. The Canto guerra per gl’Italiani was his most popular opus in this genere. He wrote many ballets, his most popular ones being Odetta or the Madness of Charles VI, King of France (1847), and Faust (1848), both choreographed by Jules Perrot. However, Faust would only gain notoriety after its rather disastrous premiere. In 1852, he began to conduct at the Covent Garden Theatre, London. But only 6 years later, he would have to cancel this engagement due to his heart illness. In 1859, after Verdi had to decline writing a hymn for King Victor Emanuel II, Panizza stepped in to write it. However, his Canto di Guerra was not liked. Between late 1859 and early 1860, Panizza conducted at the Teatro Regio, Turin. Because of his illness, he was taken back to Milan. He died on May 1, 1860, at the age of fifty-seven.

== Personal life ==
Panizza was good friends with the Cavalini brothers, Ernesto and Eugenio. Panizza grew fond of their sister, Amalia, and married her on July 10, 1839. His son, Achille, was born on September 1, 1842. Achille fathered a girl in 1872 but she died at age 1. Achille is never recorded as having more children. The writer Cletto Arrighi did, however, identify Achille in his sexual life as "terribly prolific".

== Operas ==
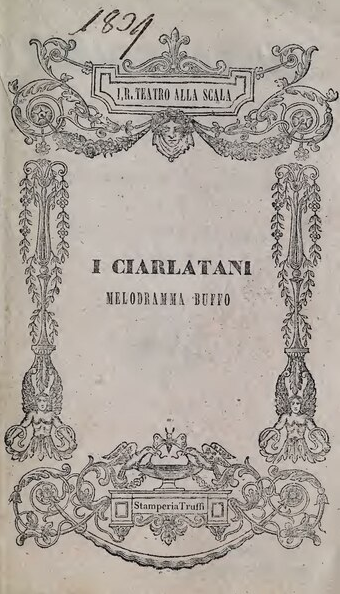
- Poster for I Ciarlatani
- 1831 - La Collerica
- 1839 - I Ciarlatani
- 1855 - Sansone, performed at the Carcano Theater

== Ballets ==
- 1832 - Merope (composed with Luigi Maria Viviani), choreography by Antonio Cortesi
- 1837 - Ottaviano in Egitto
- October 10, 1837 – Ettore Fieramosca , choreography by Giovanni Galzerani, performed at La Scala.
- Autumn 1839 - Lago delle Fate, choreography by Domenico Ronzani, performed at La Scala.
- March 16, 1847 – Odetta, ou la Demenza di Carlo VI re di Francia (Panizza composed the music for the mimed action while the dances were composed by Giovanni Bajetti and Giovanni Battista Croff), choreography by Jules Perrot, performed at La Scala.
- February 12, 1848 – Faust (with a Pas de sept composed by Giovanni Bajetti and a Pas de Fascination taken from the ballet Alma by Michael Andrew Costa), choreography by Jules Perrot, performed at La Scala.
- October 8, 1858 - La Bresilienne, choreography by Henri Deplaces

== Recordings ==
https://www.prestomusic.com/classical/products/8269208--bassi-viviani-panizza-pessina-cappelli-ponchielli-pillevestre-chamber-music-for-piccolo-clarinet

https://www.prestomusic.com/classical/products/8070049--il-clarinetto-allopera

https://www.prestomusic.com/classical/products/8035938--il-clarinetto-piccolo-allopera

https://www.prestomusic.com/classical/products/8023793--rare-italian-clarinet-chamber-music-of-the-19th-century

https://www.prestomusic.com/classical/products/7935951--the-art-of-the-clarinettist

(Most of these recordings can be found on popular music streaming services)

Available on YouTube:

https://www.youtube.com/watch?v=q1rctkNizcY&list=PL5xwD_yRZfpLqbTfxhnR2SKJnxq1cPAiz (Ballabile con Variazioni nel ballo Ettore Fieramosca)

https://www.youtube.com/watch?v=xYt9HObi8SI&list=PL5xwD_yRZfpLqbTfxhnR2SKJnxq1cPAiz&index=2 (Waltz from act IV of Faust)

https://www.youtube.com/watch?v=c8GWQZtUEC0&list=PL5xwD_yRZfpLqbTfxhnR2SKJnxq1cPAiz&index=3 (Gli Innamorati)

https://www.youtube.com/watch?v=8uMdN2igULs&list=PL5xwD_yRZfpLqbTfxhnR2SKJnxq1cPAiz&index=4 (Passo a due eseguito nel Ballo I Figli di Edoardo IV; arranged by Panizza and Cavalini after Luigi Ferdinando Casamorata and Luigi Maria Viviani who composed the original score)

== Sources ==
- Giacomo Panizza Maestro Al Cembalo E Suo Figlio Achille Panizza
- Italian Ballet, 1637-1977 : a catalogue / by Morris S. Levy and John Milton Ward.
