= Antonio Cortesi =

Italian composer

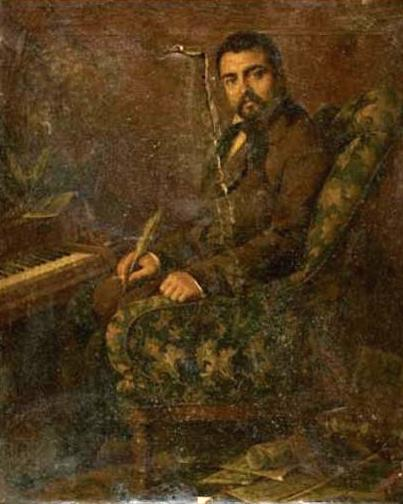
Portrait of Antonio Cortesi by Francesco De Vivo

Antonio Cortesi (December 1796 – April 1879) was an Italian ballet dancer, choreographer, and composer. He was particularly known for the numerous ballets which he created and choreographed in the first half of the 19th Century for major Italian theatres, including La Scala, La Fenice, and the Teatro Regio in Turin.

Cortesi was born in Pavia, the son of the dancer and choreographer Giuseppe Cortesi and the ballerina Margherita Reggini.

== Ballets ==
Many of Cortesi's ballets had music expressly composed for them by Luigi Maria Viviani. Others used existing pieces of music by a variety of composers, chosen and arranged by Cortesi. On occasion, he composed some of the music himself, especially for his one-act ballets. Ballets devised and choreographed by Cortesi include:

- Santa Genoveva, premiered Theatro de São Carlos, Lisbon, 23 February 1823
- O mouro de Venezia, premiered Theatro de São Carlos, Lisbon, 28 April 1823
- Furores de Oreste, premiered Theatro de São Carlos, Lisbon, 22 August 1823
- Il castello del diavolo ossia La fiera, premiered Teatro Regio, Turin, 26 December 1825
- Oreste, Luigi Maria Viviani (composer), premiered Teatro Regio, Turin, 26 December 1825
- Chiara di Rosemberg, Luigi Maria Viviani (composer), premiered Teatro Regio, Turin, 20 January 1826
- Ines de Castro, Luigi Maria Viviani (composer), premiered Teatro Regio, Turin, 20 March 1827
- Merope, Luigi Maria Viviani (composer), premiered Teatro Regio, Turin, 27 December 1828
- L'ultimo giorno di Missolungi, Luigi Maria Viviani (composer), premiered La Fenice, Venice, 16 February 1833
- Le piccole Danaidi, Luigi Maria Viviani (composer), premiered Teatro Regio, Turin, 6 January 1834
- Gismonda, Giovanni Bajetti and Luigi Maria Viviani (composers), premiered La Fenice, Venice, 26 December 1835
- Marco Visconti, Luigi Maria Viviani (composer), premiered La Scala, Milan, 19 October 1836
- Il ratto delle donzelle veneziane, Luigi Maria Viviani (composer), premiered La Fenice, Venice, 26 December 1837
- Nabuccodonosor, premiered Teatro Regio, Turin, 1838
- Mazeppa, Luigi Maria Viviani (composer), premiered Teatro Comunale, Bologna, 1 October 1844
- Fausto, Luigi Maria Viviani (composer), based on Jules Perrot's choreography for Faust, premiered Teatro Regio, Turin, 25 December 1851
- La Gerusalemme liberata, Luigi Maria Viviani (composer), premiered Teatro Regio, Turin, 25 December 1852
