= Margaret Burke Sheridan =

Irish opera singer (1899–1958)

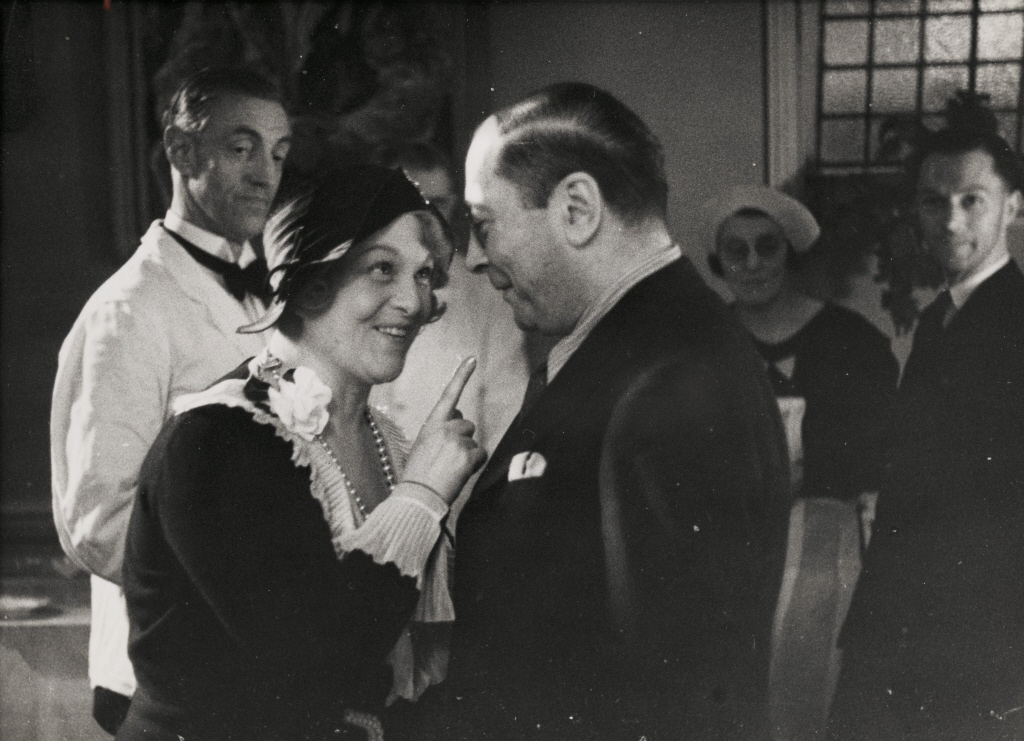
- Sheridan with Italian conductor Vincenzo Bellezza, 1938
- Born: 15 October 1889; Castlebar, County Mayo, Ireland
- Died: 16 April 1958 (aged 68); Dublin, Ireland
- Education: Royal Academy of Music
- Occupation: Lyric soprano
- Years active: 1918–1930
- Known for: Madama Butterfly
- Style: Opera; Irish traditional song

Margaret Burke Sheridan (15 October 1889 – 16 April 1958) was an Irish opera singer, a lyric soprano. Born in Castlebar, County Mayo, she was known as Maggie from Mayo and is regarded as Ireland's second prima donna, after Catherine Hayes.

== Education and career ==
Sheridan had her early vocal training while at school at the Dominican Convent on Eccles Street, Dublin, with additional lessons from Vincent O'Brien. In 1908, she won a gold medal at the Feis Ceoil. From 1909 to 1911, she studied at the Royal Academy of Music, London, during which time she was introduced to the Italian inventor Guglielmo Marconi, who was instrumental in arranging further studies for her in opera in Rome. With Marconi's help, she auditioned in 1916 for Alfredo Martino, a prominent singing teacher associated with the Teatro Costanzi, and she made her debut there in January 1918 in Giacomo Puccini's La bohème. In July 1919, she appeared at the Royal Opera House (Covent Garden) in the title role in Iris by Pietro Mascagni. Sheridan returned to Italy, where her career continued to grow, with performances at the Teatro Dal Verme in Milan and at the Teatro di San Carlo in Naples, primarily in Puccini roles. In 1922, she first sang at La Scala, Milan, in Catalani's La Wally, under the direction of Arturo Toscanini. For the next few years, she would sing at La Scala with great success. Perhaps her greatest role was that of Puccini's Madama Butterfly, which she sang extensively in Italy and at Covent Garden. When she played the part of Madama Butterfly, Puccini was said to be spellbound.

== Later years and death ==
Despite her successes, Sheridan's career was short. Suffering vocal difficulties, she went into retirement around 1930 except for a few concerts. Bríd Mahon, in her 1998 book While Green Grass Grows (p. 123), states, "It was rumoured that an Italian whose overtures she had rejected had blown his brains out in a box in La Scala, Milan, while she was on stage and that after the tragedy she never sang in public again."

She died in relative obscurity, having lived in Dublin for many years, and her remains were buried in Glasnevin Cemetery, Dublin.

== Recordings ==
Sheridan made a complete recording of Puccini's Madama Butterfly with the La Scala orchestra in 1929–30 on gramophone records, as well as a number of recordings of operatic duets with the tenor Aureliano Pertile and arias from selected operas by Michael William Balfe, Arrigo Boito, Puccini, Giuseppe Verdi and Richard Wagner. She also recorded various Irish traditional song arrangements by Balfe, John William Glover, Thomas Moore and others.

== Bibliography ==
- O'Brien, C.; Lustig, L.; Kelly, A. (1988). "Margaret Burke Sheridan". Record Collector. Vol. 33. pp. 187–213.
- Chambers, Ann (1989). La Sheridan, Adorable Diva. Margaret Burke Sheridan, Irish Prima-Donna, 1889–1958. Dublin: Wolfhound Press. ISBN 978-0-86327-230-1.

== See also ==
- List of people on the postage stamps of Ireland § 1980s
