= Norma (opera) =

Opera by Vincenzo Bellini

- Opera by Vincenzo Bellini
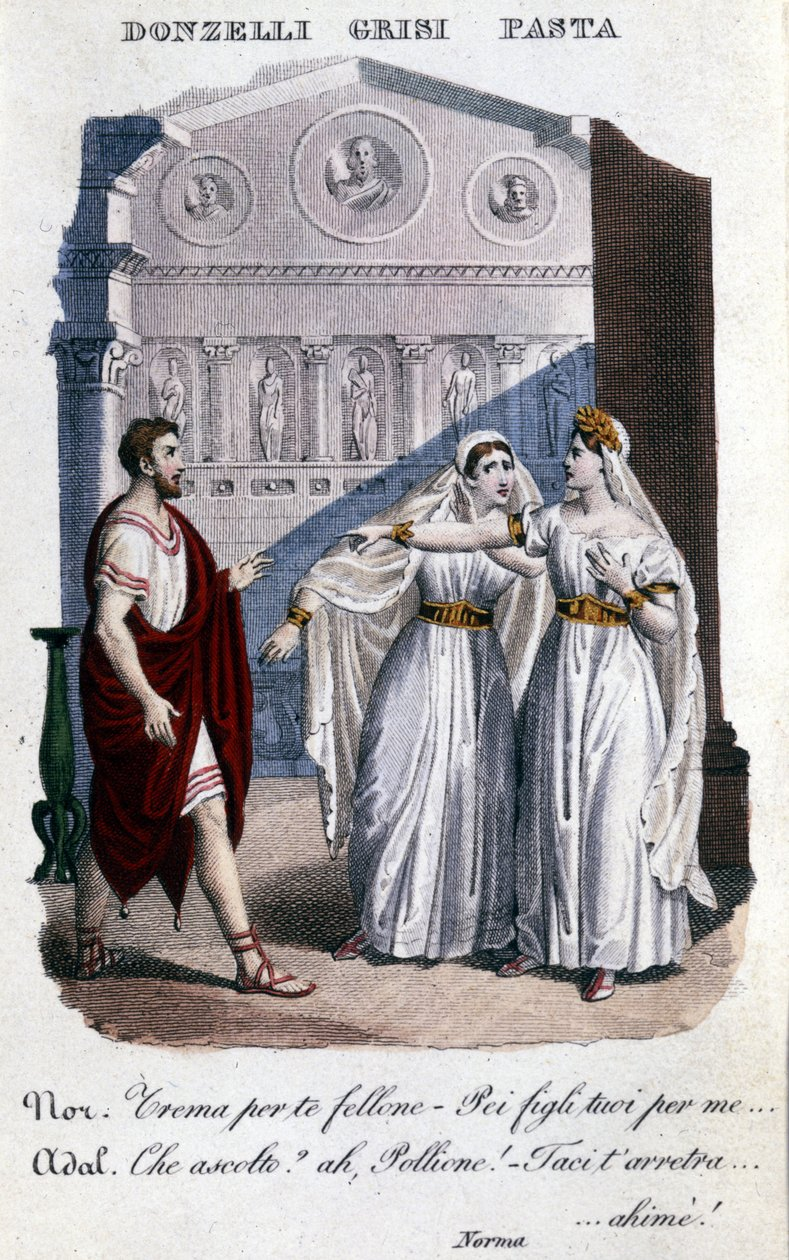
- Domenico Donzelli, Giuditta Pasta, and Giulia Grisi (original cast)
- Librettist: Felice Romani
- Language: Italian
- Based on: Alexandre Soumet's play Norma, ou L'infanticide
- Premiere: 26 December 1831; Teatro alla Scala, Milan

Norma (Italian: [ˈnɔrma]) is a tragedia lirica or opera in two acts by Vincenzo Bellini with libretto by Felice Romani after the play Norma, ou L'infanticide (Norma, or The Infanticide) by Alexandre Soumet. It was first produced at La Scala in Milan on 26 December 1831.

The opera is regarded as a leading example of the bel canto genre, and the soprano prayer "Casta diva" in Act 1 is a famous piece. Among the well known singers of Norma of the first half of the 20th century was Rosa Ponselle who played the role in New York and London. Notable exponents of the title role in the post-war period have been Maria Callas, Leyla Gencer, Joan Sutherland, and Montserrat Caballé.

== Composition history ==
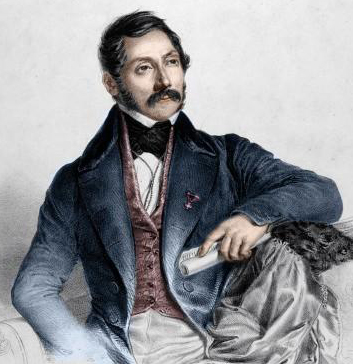
Librettist Felice Romani

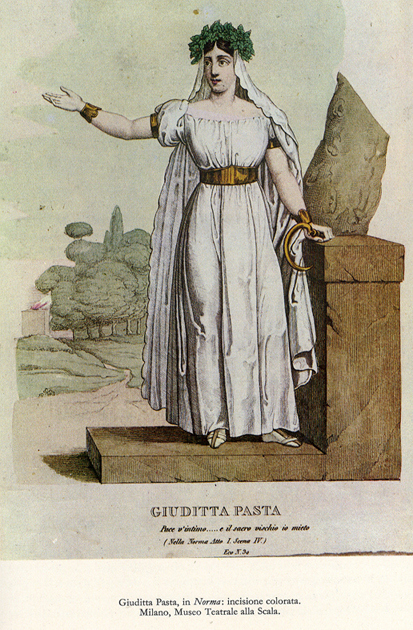
Giuditta Pasta, for whom the role of Norma was created

Crivelli and Company were managing both La Scala and La Fenice in Venice, and as a result, in April–May 1830 Bellini was able to negotiate a contract with them for two operas, one at each theatre. The opera for December 1831 at La Scala became Norma, while the one for the 1832 Carnival season at La Fenice became Beatrice di Tenda.

With Bellini's La sonnambula successfully staged in March 1831 and Giuditta Pasta having demonstrated her extensive vocal and dramatic ranges in creating the role of Amina, the Swiss village maiden, she had been engaged by La Scala for her debut during the following season. Bellini and Romani then began to consider the subject of the coming autumn's opera. By the summer, they had decided to base it on Alexandre Soumet's play which was being performed in Paris at around that time and which Pasta would have seen.

For the forthcoming autumn/winter season, La Scala had engaged Giulia Grisi (the sister of Giuditta Grisi) and the well-known tenor Domenico Donzelli, who had made a name for himself with Rossini roles, especially that of Otello. They would fill the roles of Adalgisa and Pollione. Donzelli provided Bellini with precise details of his vocal capabilities which were confirmed by a report which the Neapolitan composer Saverio Mercadante also provided. By the end of August it appears that Romani had completed a considerable amount of the libretto, enough at least to allow Bellini to begin work, which he certainly did in the first weeks of September as the verses were supplied. He reported in a letter to Pasta on 1 September:

I hope that you will find this subject to your liking. Romani believes it to be very effective, and precisely because of the all-inclusive character for you, which is that of Norma. He will manipulate the situations so that they will not resemble other subjects at all, and he will retouch, even change, the characters to produce more effect, if need be.

Norma was completed by about the end of November. While, for Romani, it became "the most beautiful rose in the garland" of all his work with Bellini, it was not achieved without some struggles. Bellini, now at the height of his powers, was very demanding of his librettist and required many re-writes before he was satisfied enough to set it to music.

== Performance history ==
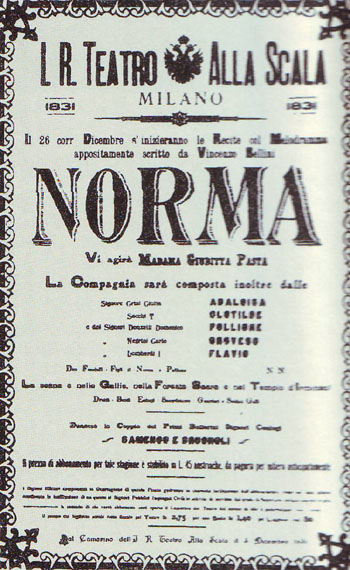
Poster advertising the 1831 premiere

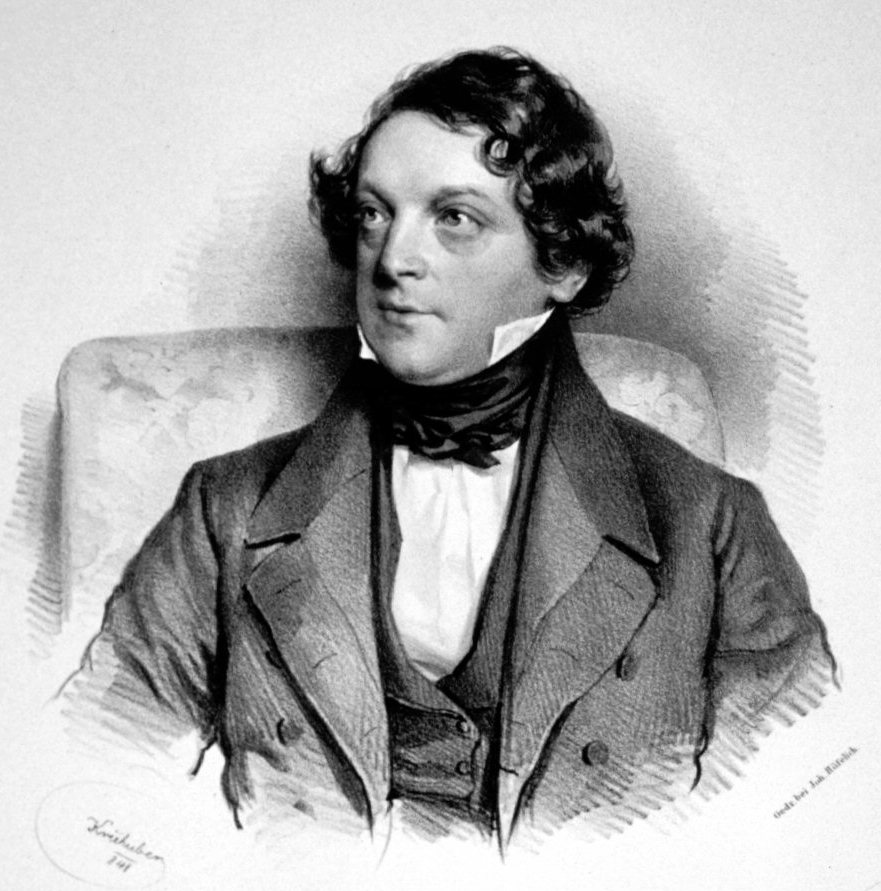
Domenico Donzelli sang Pollione

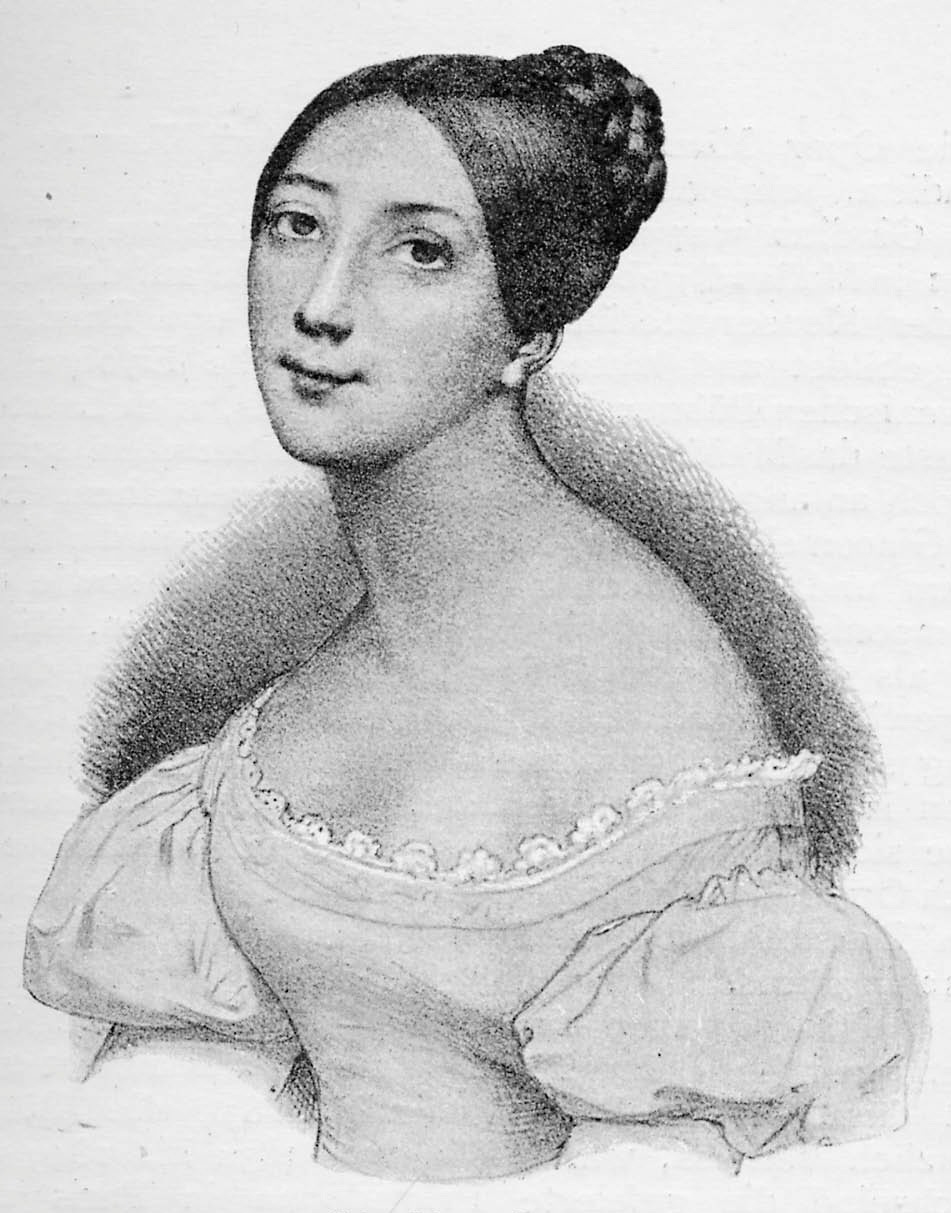
Giulia Grisi sang Adalgisa

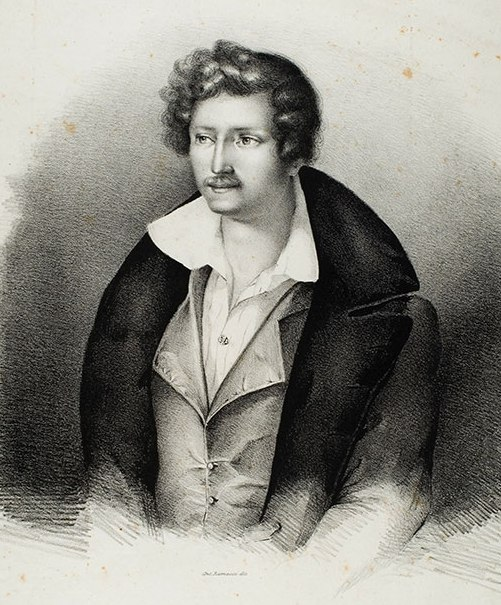
Vincenzo Negrini sang Oroveso

=== Premiere performances ===
After rehearsals began on 5 December 1831, Pasta balked at singing the "Casta diva" in act 1, now one of the most famous arias of the nineteenth century. She felt that it was "ill adapted to her vocal abilities", but Bellini was able to persuade her to keep trying for a week, after which she adapted to it and confessed her earlier error. On opening night, the opera was received with what Weinstock describes as "chill indifference". To his friend Francesco Florimo, on the night of the premiere, Bellini wrote "Fiasco! Fiasco! Solemn fiasco!" and proceeded to tell him of the indifference of the audience and how it affected him.

In a letter to his uncle on 28 December, Bellini tried to explain the reasons for the reactions. As other commentators have noted, some problems were innate to the structure and content of the opera, while others were external to it. Bellini notes that the singers were tired after rehearsing the entire second act on the day of the premiere, and that certain numbers failed to please the audience or himself. He goes on to say that most of the second act was very effective. It appears from the letter that the second evening's performance was more successful and Weinstock reports it was from this performance forward that it "was recognised as a successful and important opera" with 208 performances given at La Scala alone by the end of the 19th century.

Among the external reasons, Bellini cited the adverse reaction caused by "hostile factions in the audience" consisting of both the owner of a journal (and his claque) and also of "a very rich woman", who is identified by Weinstock as Contessa Giulia Samoyloff, the mistress of the composer Giovanni Pacini. Bellini had long felt a rivalry with Pacini, since the failure of his own Zaira in Parma and his return to Milan in June 1829. With no firm contract for a new opera for Bellini, Pacini's success with his Il Talismano at La Scala—where it received 16 performances—fueled this rivalry for Bellini. It was only when he staged a triumphant revival of his own with Il pirata with the original cast that he felt vindicated. Pirata received 24 consecutive performances between 16 July and 23 August 1829, more than Pacini's Il Talismano.

Bellini also noted that the theatre was full for the second performance of Norma. In all, Norma was given 34 performances in its first season at La Scala, and reports from elsewhere, especially those from Bergamo, when it was staged in late 1832, suggested that it was becoming more and more popular. Between 1831 and 1850 Weinstock provides details of the dozens of performances given in numerous cities outside of Italy, and then he gives details of those beyond.

Bellini left Milan for Naples, and then Sicily, on 5 January 1832 and, for the first time since 1827, 1832 became a year in which he did not write an opera. Norma quickly "[conquered] the whole of Europe in the space of a few years".

=== Later revivals ===
Richard Wagner conducted Norma at Riga in 1837. Following the common nineteenth-century practice of adding interpolated arias, he wrote an aria for the bass and men's chorus for this production. However, that aria has not entered the general repertoire. Wagner wrote at the time that Norma was "indisputably Bellini's most successful composition". "In this opera, Bellini has undoubtedly risen to the greatest heights of his talent. In these days of romantic extravaganzas and the hyper-excitement of the so-called musical attractions he presents a phenomenon which can hardly be overrated. The action, free from all theatrical coups and dazzling effects, reminds one instinctively of a Greek tragedy. Perhaps the views expressed by Schiller in his 'Bride of Messina' to the effect that he had hopes for the full revival of the tragedy of the ancients upon our stage, in the form of the opera, will receive new justification in this Norma! Let anyone name me a spiritual painting of its kind, more fully carried out, than that of this wild Gaelic prophetess...Every emotional moment stands out plastically; nothing has been vaguely swept together..."

Wagner also praised Romani's libretto:

Here, where the poem rises to the tragic height of the ancient Greeks, this kind of form, which Bellini has certainly ennobled, serves only to increase the solemn and imposing character of the whole; all the phases of passion, which are rendered in so peculiarly clear a light by his art of song, are thereby made to rest upon a majestic soil and ground, above which they do not vaguely flutter about, but resolve themselves into a grand and manifest picture, which involuntarily calls to mind the creations of Gluck and Spontini.

The opera was given its British premiere in London on 20 June 1833 and its US premiere at the St. Charles Theatre in New Orleans on 1 April 1836. In the late 1840s and during the Risorgimento era, some of the music was used in demonstrations of nationalistic fervour, one such example being the 1848 celebration of the liberation of Sicily from the rule of the Bourbons held in the cathedral in Palermo. There, the "Guerra, guerra" (War, war!) chorus from act 2 was sung. Norma received its first performance at the Metropolitan Opera in New York on 27 February 1890 with Lilli Lehmann singing the title role in German.

=== Modern times ===
The Metropolitan Opera revived Norma in 1927 (the first performance of the opera there since 1892) with Rosa Ponselle in the title role.

During the later 20th century, with the bel canto revival, the most prolific Norma was the Greek-American soprano Maria Callas, who gave 89 stage performances (several of which exist on live recordings as well as two on studio versions made in 1954 and 1960). Callas's first appearances in the role began at the Teatro Comunale di Firenze in November/December 1948 followed by the second at the Teatro Colón, Buenos Aires in June 1949, both of which were conducted by Tullio Serafin. The following year, she appeared in the role at La Fenice in Venice in January 1950, this time under Antonino Votto, and in Mexico in May 1950 conducted by Guido Picco. In London in 1952, Callas sang Norma at the Royal Opera House, Covent Garden in November (where the role of Clotilde was sung by Joan Sutherland); she made her American debut singing the role at the Lyric Opera of Chicago in November 1954 under Nicola Rescigno; and then she appeared at the Metropolitan Opera in New York under Fausto Cleva in October/November 1956. In 1960, she performed Norma in the Ancient Theatre of Epidaurus in Greece with the collaboration of the Greek National Opera, in the production of Alexis Minotis. After singing only a few concerts for a few years, she returned to Norma in Paris in 1965. She was unable to complete her final performance in the role on 25 May. She sang one more performance (of Tosca) a week later in London, her final appearance in a staged opera.

== Singers in the title role ==
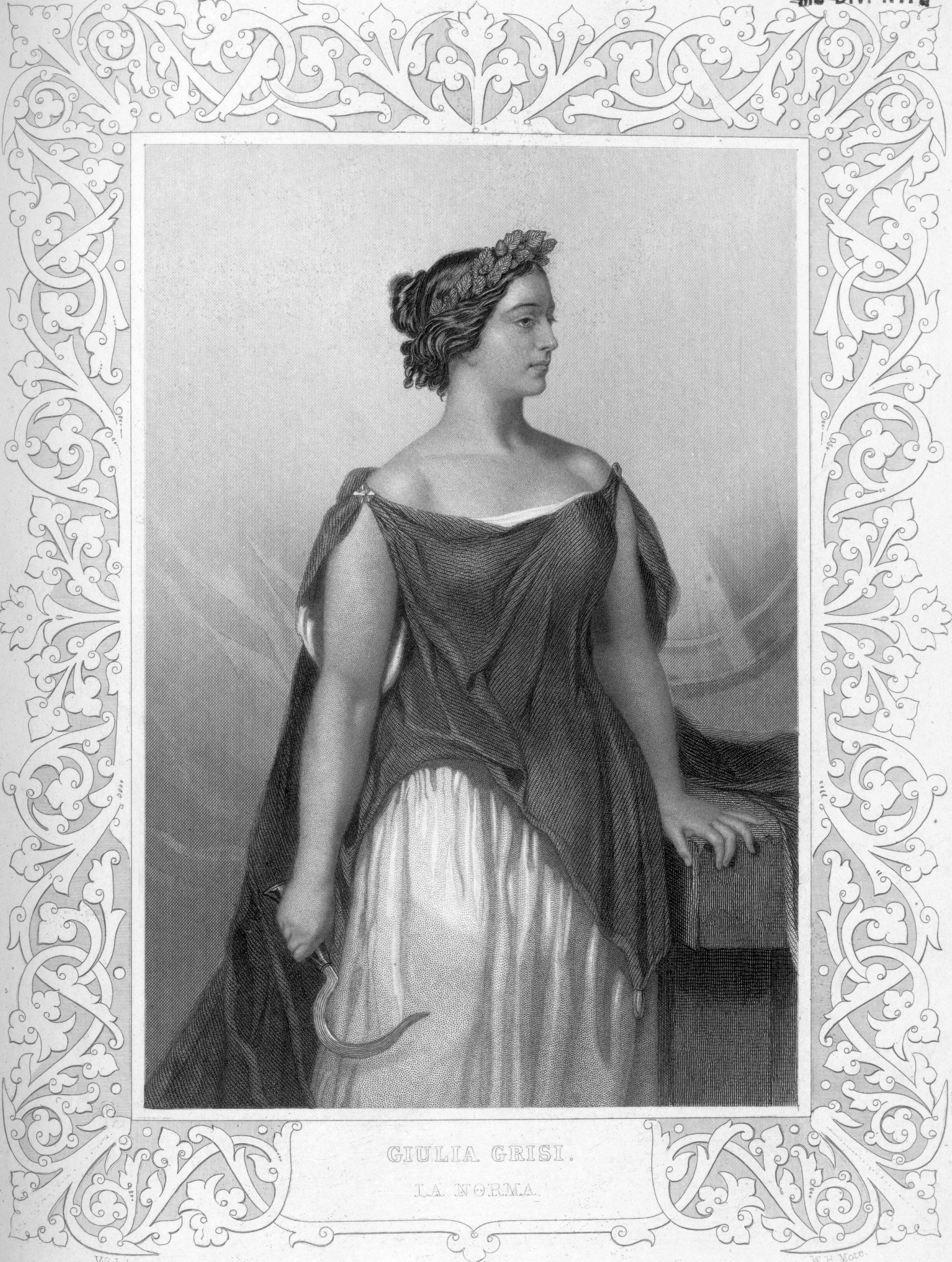
Giulia Grisi dressed as Norma. In 1831, she also sang the role of Adalgisa

The title role—"one of the most taxing and wide-ranging parts in the entire repertory"—is one of the most difficult in the soprano repertoire. It calls for great vocal control of range, flexibility, and dynamics as well as containing a wide range of emotions: conflict of personal and public life, romantic life, maternal love, friendship, jealousy, murderous intent, and resignation. The German soprano Lilli Lehmann once remarked that the singing of all three Brünnhilde roles of Wagner's opera cycle Der Ring des Nibelungen in one evening would be less stressful than the singing of one Norma. She also commented "When you sing Wagner, you are so carried away by the dramatic emotion, the action, and the scene that you do not have to think how to sing the words. That comes of itself. But in Bellini, you must always have a care for beauty of tone and correct emission." According to the Met Opera Archives, Lehmann said this to Herald Tribune critic Henry Krehbiel.

Throughout the 20th century, many singers have tackled the role of Norma. In the early 1920s, it was Rosa Raisa, Claudia Muzio, and Rosa Ponselle who were each admired. Maria Callas emerged as a major force in the role in the post-World War II period. She made two studio recordings of the opera for EMI/HMV, and several broadcasts of her live performances have been preserved from the early 1950s through her final performances of the role in Paris in May 1965.

In the 1960s, two very different performers sang the role: the Australian Dame Joan Sutherland and the Turkish Leyla Gencer. Following Sutherland's 1963 debut as Norma, Luciano Pavarotti called her "the greatest female voice of all time."

The Dutch coloratura Cristina Deutekom tackled the role in 1970. Throughout the decade, four other bel canto specialists debuted their Normas: Radmila Bakočević, Montserrat Caballé, Beverly Sills, and Renata Scotto. Also singing Norma during this period were Grace Bumbry and Shirley Verrett, the American divas who began as mezzo-sopranos and eventually started singing soprano repertoire.

During the 1980s and 1990s, the role of Norma was performed by such diverse singers as Katia Ricciarelli, Anna Tomowa-Sintow, Marisa Galvany, Dame Gwyneth Jones, and Jane Eaglen. Other Normas include Hasmik Papian, Fiorenza Cedolins, Galina Gorchakova, Maria Guleghina, Nelly Miricioiu, June Anderson, Edita Gruberová and Carmela Remigio (who performs more frequently the role of Adalgisa).

In 2008, Daniela Dessì performed as Norma at Teatro Comunale di Bologna. In 2010 (in Dortmund) and 2013 (at the Salzburg Festival) the role was taken by mezzo-soprano Cecilia Bartoli: this version was also recorded with coloratura soprano Sumi Jo as Adalgisa. In 2011, Sondra Radvanovsky also added the role to her repertory, one to which she returned in the autumn 2014 at the San Francisco Opera and in the autumn of 2017 at the Metropolitan Opera in New York. On 13 April 2013, the Italian bel canto soprano, Mariella Devia, after a career of 40 years and one day after turning 65, successfully made her debut as Norma at the Teatro Comunale di Bologna.Angela Meade has played the role often, including in 2013 and 2017 at the Metropolitan Opera in New York.

In 2025 Jessica Pratt performed the role for Teatro alla Scala in Milan singing "Casta Diva" in the originally conceived key of G Major for the first time ever in the theatre it was written for.

== Roles ==
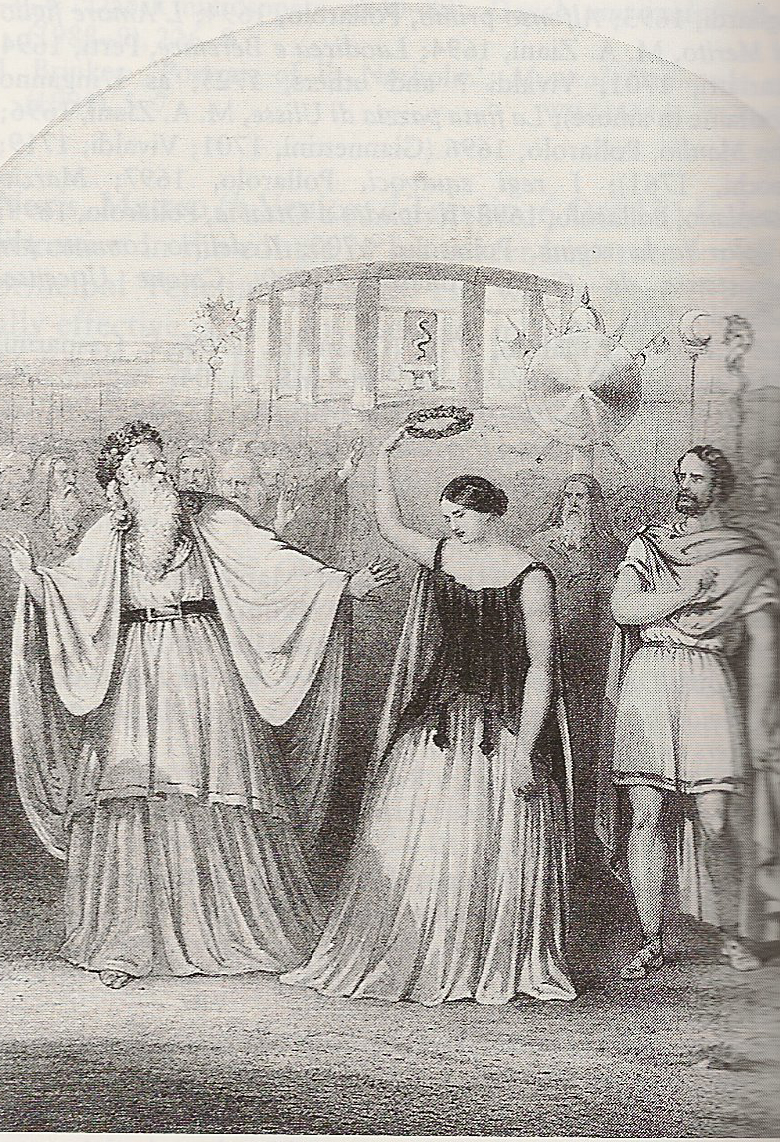
Act 2 finale, Luigi Lablache as Oroveso, Giulia Grisi (as Norma), Dominique Conti as Pollione. Her Majesty's Theatre, London, 1843

Roles, voice types, premiere cast
Role	Voice type	Premiere cast, 26 December 1831 Capo d'orchestra: Alessandro Rolla
Norma, daughter of Oroveso, High-priestess of the druids	soprano	Giuditta Pasta
Pollione, Roman proconsul in Gaul	tenor	Domenico Donzelli
Oroveso, Norma's father; chief of the druids	bass	Vincenzo Negrini
Adalgisa, priestess in the grove of the Irminsul statue	soprano (Note: Adalgisa is often sung by mezzo-sopranos.)	Giulia Grisi
Clotilde, Norma's friend	soprano	Marietta Sacchi
Flavio, Pollione's companion	tenor	Lorenzo Lombardi
Druids, bards, Gallic priests, warriors and soldiers

== Plot overview ==
The action takes place in Gaul under the Roman occupation, and is centered on the love triangle between Pollione, the Roman proconsul of Gaul, Norma, his former companion, and the young Adalgisa. The background is the uprising of the Gallic people against the Roman occupiers, led by the Druid Oroveso.

Norma, the high priestess of the Druid temple, who had two children by Pollione, the Roman proconsul of Gaul, breaking her Druid chastity vows, discovers that her lover is now in love with her friend, the young Druid priestess Adalgisa. Norma tries to convince Pollione to give up Adalgisa and return to her, but he refuses. Norma publicly confesses her fault and is sentenced to death by fire. Pollione is moved by Norma's self-sacrifice and joins her at the stake.

== Musicodramatic synopsis ==
Place: Gaul
Time: c. 100-50 BC (Roman occupation)

=== Act 1 ===
- Sinfonia

==== Scene 1: The grove of the druids ====
Oroveso leads the druids in a procession in the forest to pray for victory against the invading Romans: (Oroveso and druids: "Ite sul colle, o druidi" / "Go into the hills, Druids"). The druids pray that Norma will come and have the courage to broker peace with the Romans: (Druids and Oroveso: "Dell'aura tua profetica" / "With thy prophetic aura, imbue her, O terrible God".) All leave to go to the temple.

Pollione and Flavio enter. Although Norma has secretly broken her vows in order to love him and has borne him two children, Pollione tells Flavio that he no longer loves Norma, having fallen in love with the priestess Adalgisa. But he expresses some remorse, describing his dream in which Adalgisa was beside him at the altar of Venus and a huge storm arose: (Pollione, aria: "Meco all'altar di Venere" / "With me at the altar in Rome was Adalgisa dressed in white, veiled all in white.") The storm presaged disaster for both Norma and himself: "Thus does Norma punish her faithless lover," he declares. They hear the trumpets sounding to announce Norma's arrival. Flavio urges his friend to leave, but Pollione stands firm, proclaiming that he will confront Norma and the druids with a superior power and overthrow their altars: (Cabaletta: "Me protegge, me difende" / "I am protected and defended")

"Casta Diva"
Claudia Muzio, circa 1936

As Norma leads the druids and priestesses, the crowd proclaims: "Norma viene" / "Norma is coming" and, as Oroveso awaits her, they describe her dress and manner. All kneel as she approaches. "The time is not ripe for our revenge", she declares, stating that Rome will perish one day by being worn down. Then, with the mistletoe in hand, she approaches the altar with a plea to the moon (the "Chaste Goddess"): (cavatina: "Casta diva" / "Chaste goddess"). She pleads that the goddess shed upon earth the peace that she has created in heaven. She calls for all to complete the rites and then clear the uninitiated from the grove. To herself, she declares that she cannot hurt Pollione, but desires that things return to where they used to be: (Cabaletta: "Ah! bello a me ritorna" / "Return to me, O beautiful one"). The assembled crowd accepts her cautious approach, and all leave the grove.

Later that night: The Temple of Irminsul in the grove

Adalgisa prays at the temple, remembering with some sorrow how she became involved with Pollione. He enters, telling her that she prays to a cruel god and is not trying to invoke the god of love. As she appears to reject him, he declares (Aria: "Va crudele" /"Go, O cruel one") but he is convinced that he cannot leave her. He is distraught, and she doesn't show she is equally torn, until the moment he declares that he must return to Rome the following day. He begs Adalgisa to go with him: (Duet: Pollione, then Adalgisa, then together: "Vieni in Roma" / "Come to Rome"). She resists him, but finally agrees that they will leave together the following day.

==== Scene 2: Norma's dwelling ====
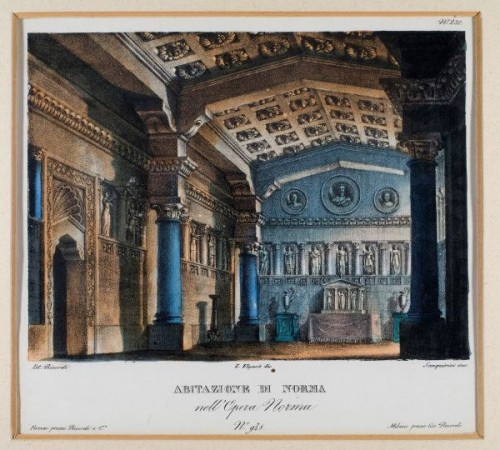
Alessandro Sanquirico's set design for act 1, scene 2, for the original production

Norma appears to be upset and orders her maid, Clotilde, to take the two children away from her, expressing very ambivalent feelings about them. She tells Clotilde that Pollione has been recalled to Rome, but does not know if he will take her or how he feels about leaving his children. As Adalgisa approaches, the children are taken away.

Adalgisa tells Norma she has fallen in love with a Roman, whom she does not name. As she describes how she fell in love while waiting at the temple and seeing "his handsome face" appear, Norma recalls (as an aside) her own feelings for Pollione ("my passions, too, burned like this"), and more and more, their experiences of falling in love run parallel: (Norma and Adalgisa, duet: "Sola, furtiva al tempio" / "Often I would wait for him"). Adalgisa pleads for help and forgiveness, and Norma pledges that she will do that and will also free her from her vows as a priestess: (Norma: "Ah! sì, fa core, abbracciami" / "Yes, take heart, embrace me". Adalgisa: "Ripeti, o ciel, ripetimi" / "Say that again, heavens, say again")

Norma asks Adalgisa to describe the man whom she loves. Responding, she tells her that he is a Roman, and, at that moment, turns to indicate that it is Pollione who is just then entering the room. As Norma furiously turns to confront Pollione, Adalgisa is confused: Norma: "Oh! non tremare, o perfido" / "O faithless man, do not tremble".

Forcing the priestess to realise that she is the victim of a huge deception, Norma addresses Adalgisa. (Trio: each sings in succession, beginning with Norma: "Oh! di qual sei tu vittima" / "Oh, you are the victim"; then Adalgisa: "Oh! qual traspare orribile" / "What horror has been revealed"; then the two women together, followed by Pollione alone: "Norma! de' tuoi rimproveri" / "Norma, do not reproach me now", continuing with "Please give this wretched girl some respite"; after which all three repeat their words, singing at first individually, then together.)

There are angry exchanges among the three: Norma declaring Pollione to be a traitor, he trying to persuade Adalgisa to leave with him, and Adalgisa angrily telling him to go away. When he declares that it is his fate to leave Norma, she encourages the young priestess to go with him, but Adalgisa declares that she would rather die. Norma then demands that her lover go, leaving behind his children — and his honor. (Finale: brief duet, Adalgisa and Pollione: he declares his love, and she her desire for Norma not to be a source of guilt to her. Trio: Norma continues to rage at Pollione, Adalgisa repeats her desire to make him return to Norma, and Pollione curses the day when he met Norma.) Then the sound of the druids calling Norma to the temple is heard. They report that the angry god, Irminsul, has spoken. Pollione storms out.

=== Act 2 ===
- Orchestral introduction

==== Scene 1: Norma's dwelling ====
Norma looks at both of her sons, who are asleep. She considers killing them. Advancing towards them with knife upraised, she hesitates. (Recitative: "Dormono entrambi ... non vedran la mano che li percuote" / "They are both asleep ... they shall not see the hand which strikes them.") But she cannot bring herself to do it: (Aria: "Teneri, teneri figli" / "My dear, dear sons") The children wake up and she calls for Clotilde, demanding that Adalgisa be brought to her.

The young priestess enters, concerned at how pale Norma looks. Norma makes her swear to do everything she asks and, upon her agreement, tells her that she is entrusting the two children to her care and states that they should be taken to the Roman camp to their father Pollione, a man who she hopes will make a better lover for Adalgisa than he was for her. Adalgisa is aghast. Norma: "I beg you for his children's sake." (Duet, first Norma: "Deh! con te, con te li prendi" / "Please, take them with you") Adalgisa tells her that she will never leave Gaul and only agreed to the request in order to do what was good for Norma. (Duet, Adalgisa: "Vado al campo"/"I'll go to the camp") In the duet, Adalgisa agrees to go to the Roman camp and tell Pollione of Norma's grief; her hope is to persuade him to return to Norma. She then renounces Pollione: (Duet: "Mira, o Norma" / "Look, o Norma") They sing together, each expressing her own thoughts and feelings until Norma realizes that Adalgisa will give up Pollione and remain with her: (Cabaletta; Duet, Norma and Adalgisa: "Si fino all'ore estreme" / "Until the last hour")

==== Scene 2: The grove ====
The druid warriors gather and prepare themselves to attack the Romans. Oroveso enters with news from the gods: the time has not arrived to strike. Somewhat frustrated, the soldiers accept the decision.

==== Scene 3: The temple of Irminsul ====
Norma enters (Recitative: "Ei tornerà" / "He'll return"). Clotilde brings news that Adalgisa has failed to persuade Pollione to return. Although Norma questions whether she should have trusted her, she then learns from her servant that Adalgisa is returning and wishes to take her vows at the altar and that the Roman has sworn to abduct her from the temple. In anger, Norma strikes a gong-like shield as a summons to war. Trumpets sound and Oroveso and the druids all rush in, demanding to know what is happening. They hear Norma's answer and the soldiers take up the refrain: "Guerra, guerra!" / "War, war!", while Norma proclaims "Blood, blood! Revenge!"

In order for Norma to complete the rites to authorise going to war, Oroveso demands to know who will be the sacrificial victim. At that moment, Clotilde rushes in to announce that a Roman has desecrated the temple, but that he has been apprehended. It is Pollione who is led in, and Norma is urged to take the sacrificial knife to stab him but, approaching him, she is unable to perform the deed. The assembled crowd demands to know why, but she dismisses them, stating that she needs to question her victim.

The crowd departs: (Duet, Norma and Pollione: "In mia man alfin tu sei" / "At last you are in my hands"). Norma demands that he forever shun Adalgisa; only then will she release him and never see him again. He refuses, and she vents her anger by telling him that she will then kill her children. "Strike me instead", he demands, "so that only I alone will die", but she quickly asserts that not only will all the Romans die, but so will Adalgisa, who has broken her vows as a priestess. This prompts him to plead for her life. (Cabaletta: Norma and Pollione: "Già mi pasco ne' tuoi sguardi" / "Already I take pleasure in the looks you give me".) When Pollione demands the knife, she calls the priests to assemble. Norma announces that it would be better to sacrifice a priestess who has broken her vows, and orders the pyre to be lit. Oroveso demands to know who is to be sacrificed while Pollione begs that she stays silent. Norma then wonders if she is not in fact the guilty one, then reveals that it is she who is to be the victim: a high priestess who has broken her vows, has become involved with the enemy, and has borne his children. (Aria, Norma to Pollione: "Qual cor tradisti" / "The heart you betrayed"; Duet: Norma and Pollione; ensemble, Norma, Oroveso, Pollione, druids, priests: each expresses his/her sorrow, anger, pleas to Norma, with Oroveso learning for the first time that Norma is a mother.)

In the concerted finale, Norma pleads with Oroveso to spare her children, reminding her father that they are of his own blood. ("Deh! non volerli vittime" / "Please don't make them victims"). After he promises to take care of them, she prepares to leap into the flames, and the re-enamoured Pollione joins her, declaring "your pyre is mine as well. There, a holier and everlasting love will begin".

== Music ==
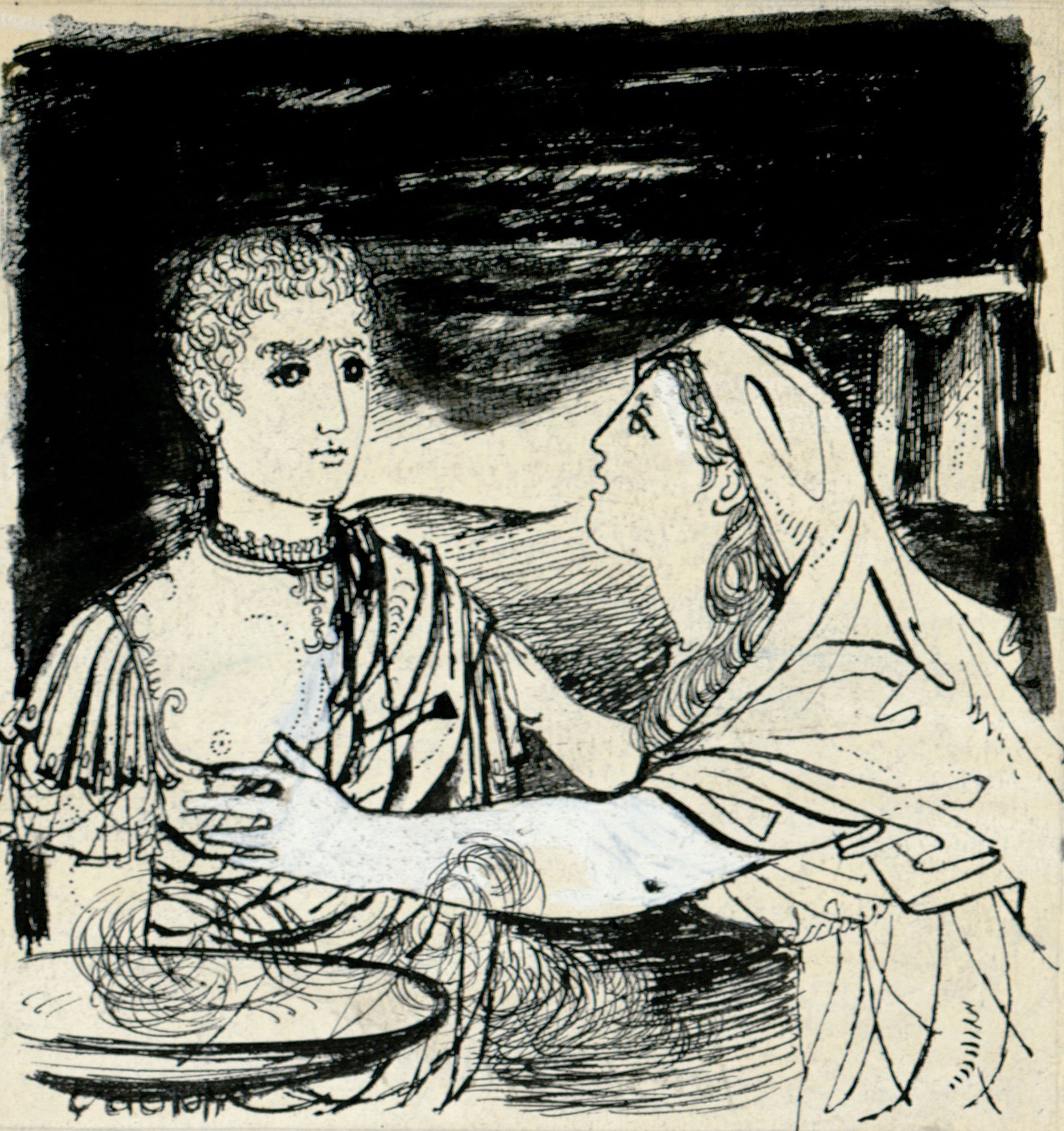
Drawing for Norma (undated)

It was Giuseppe Verdi who—late in his life—made some perceptive comments in a letter of May 1898 to Camille Belaigue, who had recently published a book on Bellini. In the letter, Verdi states:

Bellini is poor, it is true, in harmony and instrumentation; but rich in feeling and in an individual melancholy of his own! Even in the least well-known of his operas, in La straniera, in Il pirata, there are long, long, long melodies such as no-one before him had produced. And what truth and power of declamation, as for example in the duet between Pollione and Norma! [See act 2, scene 3 above. Norma: "In mia man alfin tu sei" / "At last you are in my hands"] And what elation of thought in the first phrase of the introduction [to the duet] ... no-one ever has created another more beautiful and heavenly.

Commenting on the overall quality of the music in Norma, David Kimbell states that "Bellini's most astonishing achievement in Norma is, amid all the more obvious excitements of musical Romanticism, to have asserted his belief that the true magic of opera depended on a kind of incantation in which dramatic poetry and song are perfectly fused." Additionally, Kimbell provides examples of how the composer's art is revealed in this opera, but also noting that the ability to achieve a "fusion of music and dramatic meaning is to be found elsewhere in Bellini's work".

== Schopenhauer's praise ==
Schopenhauer claimed that tragedy causes the spectator to lose the will to live.

The horrors on the stage hold up to him the bitterness and worthlessness of life, and so the vanity of all its efforts and endeavors. The effect of this impression must be that he becomes aware, although only in an obscure feeling, that it is better to tear his heart away from life, to turn his willing away from it, not to love the world and life.

He praised Norma for its artistic excellence in producing this effect.

…[T]he genuinely tragic effect of the catastrophe, the hero's resignation and spiritual exaltation produced by it, seldom appear so purely motivated and distinctly expressed as in the opera Norma, where it comes in the duet "Qual cor tradisti, qual cor perdesti" [What a heart you betrayed, what a heart you lost]. Here the conversion of the will is clearly indicated by the quietness suddenly introduced into the music. Quite apart from its excellent music, and from the diction that can only be that of a libretto, and considered only according to its motives and to its interior economy, this piece is in general a tragedy of extreme perfection, a true model of the tragic disposition of the motives, of the tragic progress of the action, and of tragic development, together with the effect of these on the frame of mind of the heroes, which surmounts the world. This effect then passes on to the spectator.

== Ibsen parody ==
Norma, or A Politician's Love (Norwegian: Norma eller En Politikers Kjærlighed) is an eight-page drama written as an opera parody by Henrik Ibsen. It is influenced by Bellini's Norma, which Ibsen saw in 1851, but the characters are contemporary politicians. The play was first printed anonymously in the satirical magazine Andhrimner in 1851. The first book edition came in 1909, and the first performance of the play was at a student theatre in Trondheim 1994.

== Marion Zimmer Bradley ==
Writer Marion Zimmer Bradley acknowledged that the plot of her 1993 historical novel/fantasy book The Forest House was based on that of Norma – relocated from Gaul to Britain, but sharing the basic plot outline of a love affair between a druidic priestess and a Roman officer. Bradley further stated that, in homage to Bellini, the hymns in chapter five and twenty-two of her book are adapted from the libretto of the opera's act 1, scene 1, and those in chapter thirty from act 2, scene 2.

== See also ==
- 555 Norma, an asteroid named after the opera
- Pasta alla Norma, a Sicilian pasta dish generally believed to be named after the opera
