= Norma (play) =

Norma, or A Politician's Love (Norwegian:Norma eller En Politikers Kjærlighed) is an eight-page drama written as an opera parody by Henrik Ibsen. It is influenced by Vincenzo Bellini's opera Norma, which Ibsen saw in 1851, but the characters are contemporary politicians. The play was first printed anonymously in the satirical magazine Andhrimner in 1851. The first book edition came in 1909, and the first performance of the play was at a student theatre in Trondheim 1994.

== List of characters ==
- Norma
- Adalgisa
- Severus
- Ariovist
- Norma and Severus' two sons
- Druids (chorus of men and women)
