= Giuseppe Pietri =

Italian composer

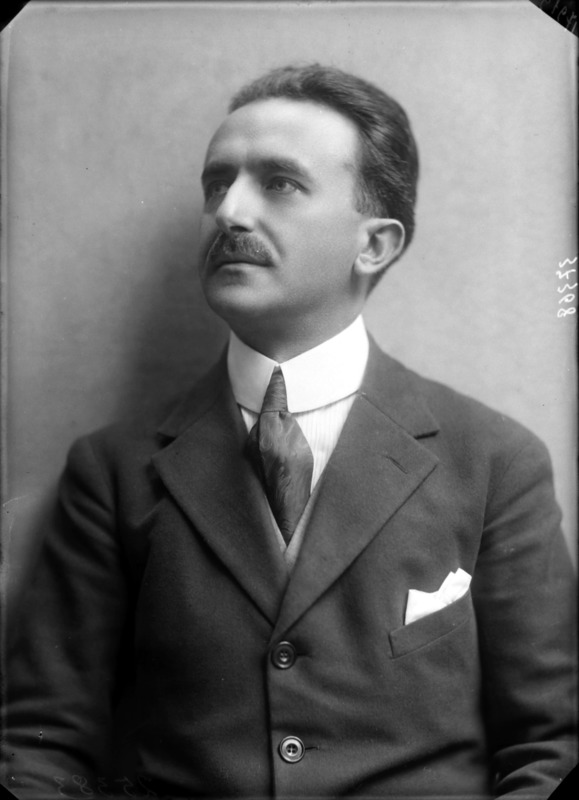

Giuseppe Pietri (Sant'Ilario, frazione of Marina di Campo, comune of Campo nell'Elba, 6 May 1886 – Milan, 11 August 1946) was an Italian composer, known primarily for his work in operetta. Excerpts from one of his works, the opera Maristella, were widely recorded and continue to be so on CD. The aria "Io conosco un giardino" from that work has been popular with tenors, and has been frequently recorded separately; among the singers to record it are Luciano Pavarotti, Beniamino Gigli, Joseph Calleja and more recently, Rolando Villazón. Pietri studied composition at the Milan Conservatory with Gaetano Coronaro. He studied harmony and counterpoint with Amintore Galli. He composed operas in versistical tradition, but it was his operettas that made him a popular success. He developed an independent Italian idiom for the operetta. The most famous was L'acqua cheta, which premiered in Rome in 1920. The text was from a 1908 Tuscan dialect piece by Augusto Novelli, a romantic comedy in the Florentine petty bourgeois style. Rompicollo was premiered in 1928 in Milan, and was translated into German as Das große Rennen ("The Big Race").

== Works ==
=== Operas ===
- Calendimaggio, libretto by Pietro Gori, Florence 1910
- Ruy Blas, based on Victor Hugo, Bologna 1916
- Maristella, Naples 1934 (excerpts available on CD from Myto Records, with Rina Gigli and Agostino Lazzari, 1956)
- Bionda Rondine, Livorno 1937
- La canzone di San Giovanni, San Remo 1939

=== Operettas ===
- In Flemmerland, libretto by Antonio Rubino, Teatro Fossati, Milan, 1913
- Addio giovinezza ("Adieu, Youth"), libretto by Sandro Camasio and Nino Oxilia, Teatro Goldoni, Livorno, 1915
- La modella, libretto by Antonio Lega and Alfredo Testoni, Teatro Quirino, Rome, 1917
- Lucciola, libretto by Carlo Veneziani, Teatro Leopoldo, Livorno, 1918
- L'acqua cheta ("Still Waters"), libretto by Augusto Novelli and Angelo Nessi, National Dramatic Theatre, Rome, 1920
- L'ascensione, libretto by Augusto Novelli, Teatro della Pergola, Florence, 1922
- Guarda, guarda la mostarda!, libretto by Giovanni Antonio Colonna di Cesarò, Teatro dei Piccoli, Rome, 1923
- La donna perduta, libretto by Guglielmo Zorzi and Guglielmo Giannini, Teatro Adriano, Rome, 1923
- Quartetto vagabondo, libretto by Enrico Serretta, Teatro Eliseo, Rome, 1924
- Namba Zaim, libretto by Carlo Veneziani, Teatro Lirico, Milan, 1926
- Prima Rosa, libretto by Carlo Lombardo and Renato Simoni, Teatro Lirico, Milan, 1926
- Tuffolina, libretto by Augusto Novelli, Politeama, Genoa, 1927
- Rompicollo ("The Race"), libretto by Luigi Bonelli and Ferdinando Paolieri, Teatro Dal Verme, Milan, 1928
- L'isola verde, libretto by Carlo Lombardo, Teatro Lirico, Milan, 1929
- Casa mia casa mia ..., libretto by Augusto Novelli and Angelo Nessi, Teatro Quirino, Rome, 1930
- Gioconda Zappaterra, libretto by Giulio Bucciolini, Teatro Alfieri, Florence, 1930
- La dote di Jeannette, libretto by Arturo Rossato, Teatro Principe, Rome, 1931
- Vent'anni, libretto by Luigi Bonelli, Teatro Quirino, Rome, 1932
