= Berislav Klobučar =

Croatian opera conductor (1924–2014)

- Klobučar in 1960
- Born: 28 August 1924; Zagreb, Croatia
- Died: 13 June 2014 (aged 89); Vienna, Austria
- Occupation: Conductor
- Years active: 1940s–2000s
- Employers: Zagreb Philharmonic Orchestra; Graz Opera; Royal Swedish Opera; Teatro alla Scala orchestra; Orchestre philharmonique de Nice; Opéra de Nice; Metropolitan Opera
- Style: Opera

Berislav Klobučar (28 August 1924 – 13 June 2014) was a Croatian opera conductor. He conducted the Vienna State Opera for more than four decades, and was multiple times a guest conductor at the Bayreuth Festival.

== Biography ==
Born in Zagreb on 28 August 1924, Klobučar was a student of conductor Lovro von Matačić. He began his career with the Zagreb Philharmonic Orchestra. He conducted the Graz Opera in Austria, the Royal Swedish Opera in Stockholm, Teatro alla Scala orchestra in Milan, the Orchestre philharmonique de Nice and the Opéra de Nice in France, and was a guest conductor at the Metropolitan Opera in New York, United States. During his forty-year tenure at the Vienna State Opera that began in 1952, he conducted 53 operas in 1133 performances.

Klobučar was conductor at the Bayreuth Festival in 1964 and 1967–69:

- 1964: Wagner, Der Ring des Nibelungen
- 1967: Wagner, Tannhäuser and Lohengrin
- 1968: Wagner, Die Meistersinger von Nürnberg and Tristan und Isolde
- 1969: Wagner, Die Meistersinger von Nürnberg

== Death ==
Klobučar died in Vienna, Austria, on 13 June 2014, at the age of 89.

== Awards ==
- Joseph Marx–Musikpreis des Landes Steiermark, 1967
- Honorary member of the Royal Swedish Academy of Music
- Commander of the Royal Order of the Polar Star
- Honorary member Vienna State Opera, 1992
- Grand Decoration of Honour in Silver for Services to the Republic of Austria, 2010
