= Teatro alla Scala orchestra =

Italian orchestra

Orchestra of the Teatro alla Scala
- Orchestra
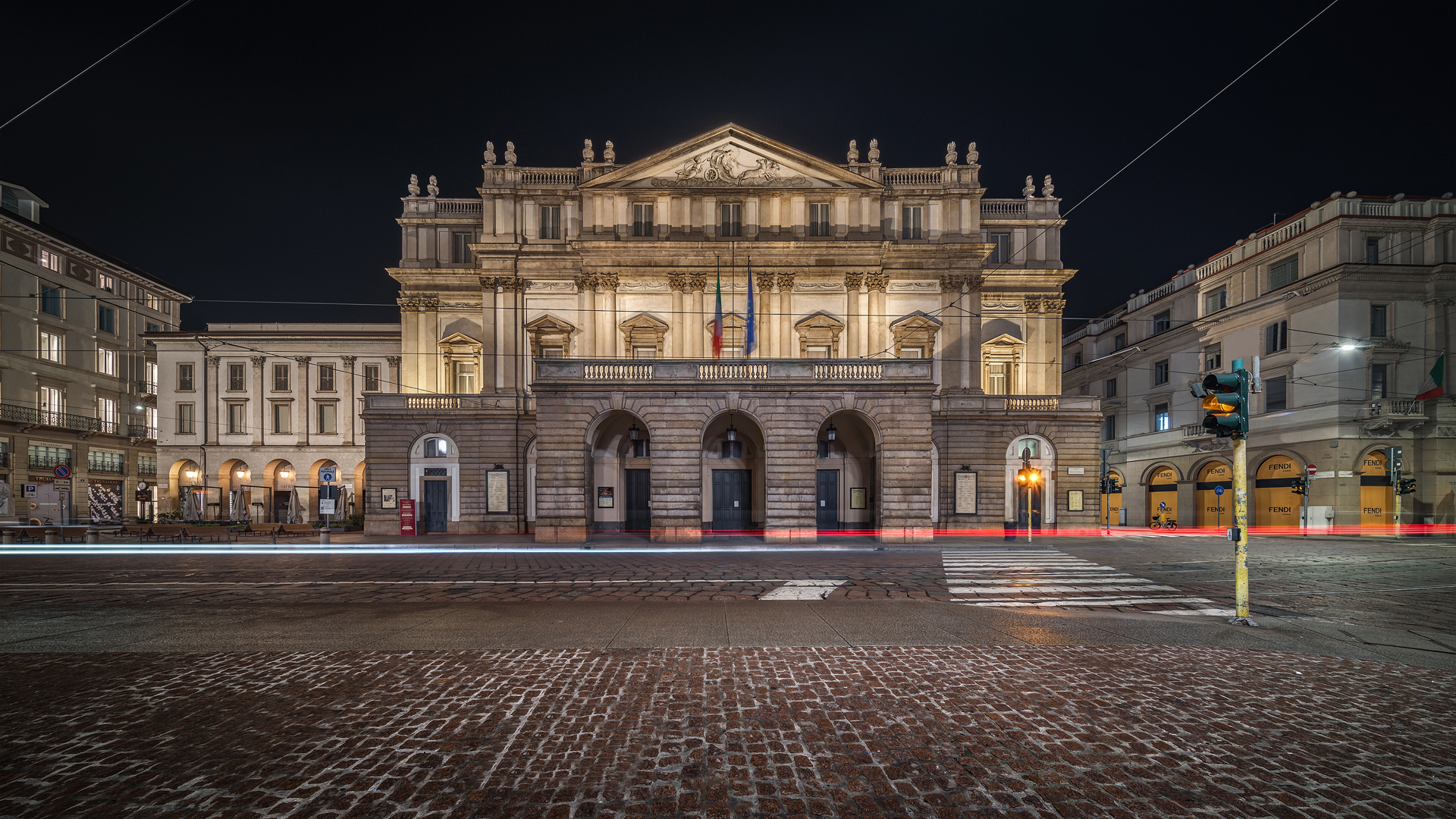
- The neoclassical façade of the theatre
- Native name: Orchestra del Teatro alla Scala
- Location: Milan, Italy
- Website: http://www.teatroallascala.org/it/la-scala/teatro/orchestra/orchestra.html

The Teatro alla Scala orchestra (Italian: Orchestra del Teatro alla Scala) is the orchestra of the La Scala opera house in Milan, Italy. It was founded in 1778, performing on the opening night of La Scala with Antonio Salieri's Europa riconosciuta. It is one of the oldest continuously active orchestras in the world.

== History ==
The orchestra has been present at La Scala since the opening of the theatre. Theater season, at the time of the theater's opening, was traditionally dominated by opera rather than chamber music or symphonic music. This so-called "melodrama disease", described by Gian Francesco Malipiero, meant the role of a permanent conductor was absent for a long time. Similar functions were carried out by the principal violinist acting as concertmaster, including Alessandro Rolla and Eugenio Cavallini, or by the harpsichord master, such as Vincenzo Lavigna, Giacomo Panizza, and Giovanni Bajetti.

Alberto Mazzucato became the first official music director of La Scala in 1854. The continued presence of major conductors, among them Arturo Toscanini, Victor de Sabata, Antonino Votto, Wilhelm Furtwängler, Herbert von Karajan, Guido Cantelli, Leonard Bernstein, Gianandrea Gavazzeni, Carlo Maria Giulini, Carlos Kleiber, Claudio Abbado, Riccardo Muti, Daniel Barenboim, and Riccardo Chailly, has greatly contributed to the orchestra's international prestige.

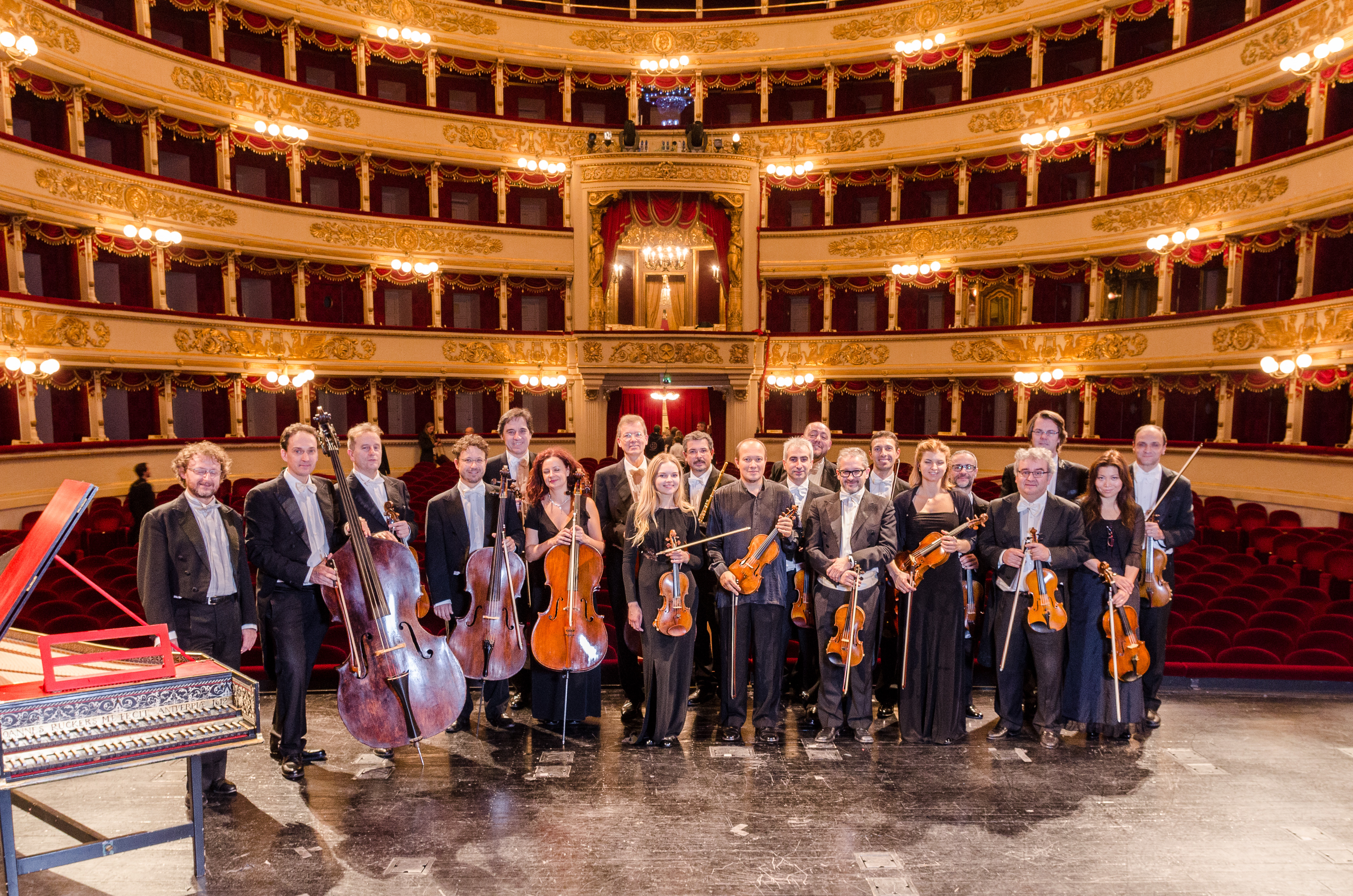
Members of the Orchestra of the Teatro alla Scala on the stage of the Piermarini auditorium.

The founding of the Filarmonica della Scala as an autonomous ensemble in 1982 significantly expanded the orchestra's symphonic activities.

== Orchestra personnel ==
=== Strings ===
First violins	Second violins	Violas	Cellos	Double basses
Francesco Manara (leader) Francesco De Angelis (leader) Laura Marzadori (leader) Daniele Pascoletti (assistant leader) Eriko Tsuchihashi (assistant leader) Andrea Leporati Rodolfo Cibin Corine van Eikema Andrea Pecolo Gianluca Turconi Elena Faccani Fulvio Liviabella Dino Sossai Duccio Beluffi Agnese Ferraro Kaori Ogasawara Enkeleida Sheshaj Suela Piciri Lucia Zanoni Damiano Cottalasso Evguenia Staneva Indro Borreani	Pierangelo Negri Anna Longiave Anna Salvatori Emanuela Abriani Gabriele Porfidio Stefano Dallera Roberto Nigro Alexia Tiberghien Stefano Lo Re Antonio Mastalli Francesco Tagliavini Roberta Miseferi Estela Shesi Leila Negro Olga Zakharova Andrea Del Moro	Simonide Braconi Giuseppe Nastasi Luciano Sangalli Giorgio Baiocco Maddalena Calderoni Francesco Lattuada Carlo Barato Joel Imperial Giuseppe Russo Rossi Matteo Amadasi Thomas Cavuoto Eugenio Silvestri Marcello Schiavi Sabina Bakholdina	Sandro Laffranchini Massimo Polidori Alfredo Persichilli Martina Lopez Gianluca Muzzolon Gabriele Zanardi Simone Groppo Cosma Beatrice Pomarico Massimiliano Tisserant Tatiana Patella Gabriele Garofano Leonardo Duca Francesco Martignon	Giuseppe Ettorre Francesco Siragusa Emanuele Pedrani Alessandro Serra Attilio Corradini Gaetano Siragusa Roberto Benatti Omar Lonati Roberto Parretti Claudio Nicotra Michelangelo Mercuri Giorgio Magistroni

=== Winds and brass ===
Flutes	Oboes	Clarinets	Bassoons	Horns	Trumpets	Trombones	Tuba
Marco Zoni Andrea Manco Giovanni Paciello (piccolo) Massimiliano Crepaldi Francesco Guggiola	Pedro Pereira De Sá Augusto Mianiti Gianni Viero	Fabrizio Meloni Aron Chiesa Christian Chiodi Latini Stefano Cardo (bass clarinet) Antonio Duca (E-flat clarinet)	Gabriele Screpis Nicola Meneghetti Maurizio Orsini Marion Reinhard (contrabassoon)	Giovanni Emanuele Urso Roberto Miele Claudio Martini Salvatore La Porta Stefano Curci Piero Mangano Giulia Montorsi	Francesco Tamiati Marco Toro Gianni Dallaturca Nicola Martelli Valerio Vantaggio	Daniele Morandini Giuseppe Grandi	Javier Castaño Medina

=== Other instruments ===
Harps	Timpani	Percussion	Organ
Luisa Prandina Olga Mazzia	Andrea Bindi Maxime Pidoux	Gianni Massimo Arfacchia Giuseppe Cacciola Gerardo Capaldo Francesco Muraca	Lorenzo Bonoldi

== Selected discography ==
- Bellini – La sonnambula, Leonard Bernstein / Maria Callas, Warner
- Bellini – Norma, Orchestra of the Teatro alla Scala / Maria Callas, Warner
- Cherubini – Medea, Leonard Bernstein / Maria Callas
- Donizetti – Anna Bolena, Gianandrea Gavazzeni / Maria Callas
- Puccini – La bohème, Riccardo Chailly / Gheorghiu / Alagna, Decca
- Verdi – Aida, Claudio Abbado / Plácido Domingo, Deutsche Grammophon
- Verdi – Requiem, Daniel Barenboim, Decca
- Rossini – Guillaume Tell, Riccardo Muti, Decca

== See also ==
- Filarmonica della Scala
- La Scala Theatre Chorus
- La Scala Ballet
