= Luigi Maria Viviani =

Italian composer

Luigi Maria Viviani (? – 1856) was an Italian composer, conductor and violinist of Florentine origin. He was primarily noted for his ballet scores, most of them composed for the choreographers Giovanni Galzerani and Antonio Cortesi. His 1851 score for Fausto was particularly praised for its obbligato written for the bimbonclaro (a variation on the bass clarinet invented by the Florentine clarinetist and instrument-maker, Giovanni Bimboni).

Viviani also composed two operas: L'eroe francese, which premiered in 1826 at the Teatro Grande in Brescia, and L'amore in guerra, which premiered in 1829 at the Teatro Alfieri in Florence.

== Ballet scores ==
- Ero e Leandro, Giovanni Galzerani (choreographer), premiered Teatro Regio, Turin, 7 December 1823
- La conquista del Perù, Giovanni Galzerani (choreographer), premiered Teatro Comunale, Bologna, 1 May 1824
- L'eroe peruviano, Giovanni Galzerani (choreographer), premiered La Fenice, Venice, 26 December 1824
- Virginia, Giovanni Galzerani (choreographer), premiered La Fenice, Venice, 8 February 1825
- Oreste, Antonio Cortesi (choreographer), premiered Teatro Regio, Turin, 26 December 1825
- Chiara di Rosemberg, Antonio Cortesi (choreographer), premiered Teatro Regio, Turin, 20 January 1826
- Ines de Castro, Antonio Cortesi (choreographer), premiered Teatro Regio, Turin, 20 March 1827
- Merope, Antonio Cortesi (choreographer), premiered Teatro Regio, Turin, 27 December 1828
- L'ultimo giorno di Missolungi, Antonio Cortesi (choreographer), premiered La Fenice, Venice, 16 February 1833
- Le piccole Danaidi, Antonio Cortesi (choreographer), premiered Teatro Regio, Turin, 6 January 1834
- Gismonda (with Giovanni Bajetti), Antonio Cortesi (choreographer), premiered La Fenice, Venice, 26 December 1835
- Marco Visconti, Antonio Cortesi (choreographer), premiered La Scala, Milan, 19 October 1836
- Il ratto delle donzelle veneziane, Antonio Cortesi (choreographer), premiered La Fenice, Venice, 26 December 1837
- Polidoro re di Lesbo (with Andrea Galli), Emanuele Viotti (choreographer), premiered La Fenice, Venice, 2 March 1840
- Mazeppa, Antonio Cortesi (choreographer), premiered Teatro Comunale, Bologna, 1 October 1844
- Fausto, Antonio Cortesi (choreographer) based on Jules Perrot's choreography for Faust, premiered Teatro Regio, Turin, 25 December 1851
- La Gerusalemme liberata, Antonio Cortesi (choreographer), premiered Teatro Regio, Turin, 25 December 1852
