= Emilio Usiglio =

Italian composer and conductor

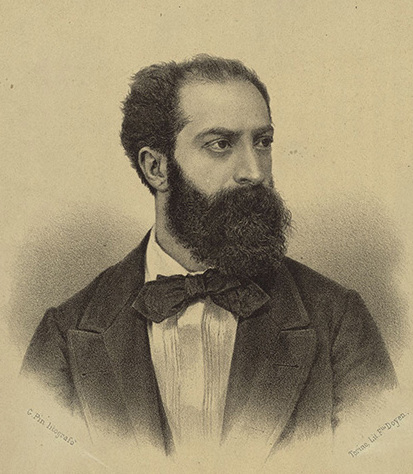
Emilio Usiglio portrayed by G. Pin (before 1910)

Emilio Usiglio (18 January 1841 – 7 July 1910) was an Italian composer and conductor.

== Life and career ==
Usiglio was born on 18 January 1841 in Parma. He studied music in Parma, first with Giuseppe Barbacini and then with Giovanni Rossi, before continuing his education in Pisa with Carlo Romani and in Florence with Teodulo Mabellini. At the age of 20 he began his operatic career with some success with La locandiera. He wrote exclusively opere buffe, his most famous being 1879's Le donne curiose after the play by Carlo Goldoni.

As a conductor, Usiglio led the premiere, in 1875, of the new version of Arrigo Boito's Mefistofele in Bologna, and in 1877 he conducted the Italian premiere of Georges Bizet's Carmen in Naples and of Hamlet by Ambroise Thomas in Venice. In 1889 he led the first Modena performances of Fosca by Antonio Gomes.

Due primarily to his increasing alcoholism, Usiglio was forced to retire as a conductor in 1897. He died in Milan on 7 July 1910. His wife was the soprano Clementina Brusa.

== Works ==
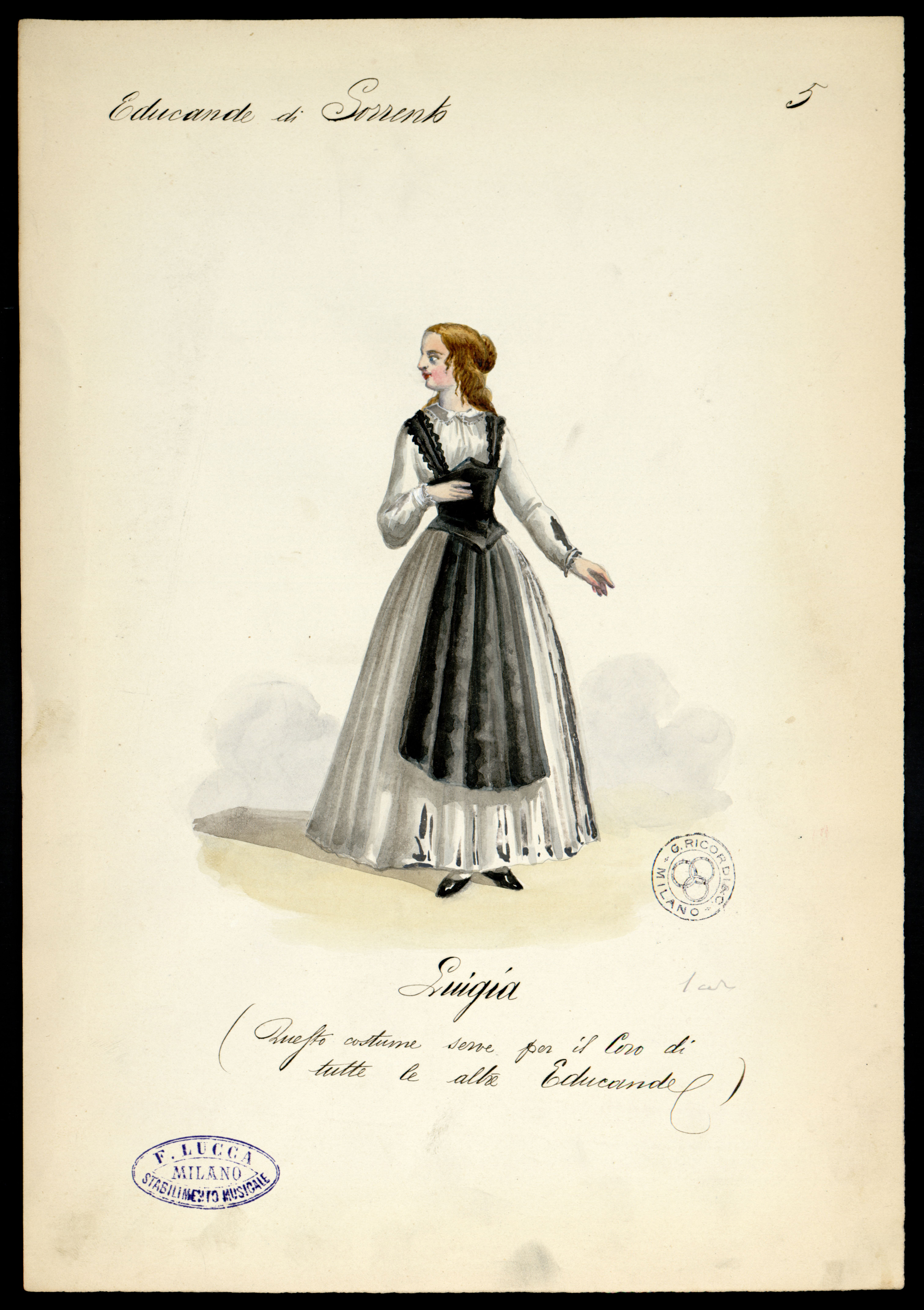
Luigia, costume design for Le educande di Sorrento (1868).

=== Operas ===
- La locandiera, libretto by Giuseppe Barilli (Turin, Teatro Vittorio Emanuele, 5 September 1861)
- Un'eredità in Corsica, libretto by Raffaello Berninzone (Milan, Teatro di Santa Radegonda, 1 July 1864)
- Le educande di Sorrento or La figlia del generale, libretto by Raffaello Berninzone (Florence, Teatro Alfieri, 1 May 1868)
- La scommessa, libretto by Benedetto Rado (Florence, Teatro Principe Umberto, 6 July 1870)
- La secchia rapita, libretto by Angelo Anelli, written in collaboration with five other composers (Florence, Teatro Goldoni, 6 April 1872)
- Le donne curiose, libretto by Angelo Zanardini (Madrid, Teatro Real, 11 February 1879)
- Nozze in prigione, libretto by Angelo Zanardini (Milan, Teatro Manzoni, 23 March 1881)
- La guardia notturna ossia La notte di San Silvestro, libretto by Raffaello Berninzone, not performed
- I fratelli di Lara, not performed

=== Ballet ===
- Atabalipa degli Incas o Pizzarro alla scoperta delle Indie (Florence, Teatro Nazionale, autumn 1866)

=== Other works ===
- Rimembranze dell'Arno, vocal album dedicated to Giovanni Pacini
- Allora... e adesso, stornello
- Lamento d'oltre tomba, for voice and piano
- Su marinar, barcarola for voice and piano

== Sources ==
- Bowen, José Antonio, The Cambridge companion to conducting, Cambridge University Press, 2003, pp. 155–156. ISBN 0-521-52791-0
- Sansone, Matteo, "Usiglio, Emilio", Grove Music Online ed. L. Macy (Accessed 3 November 2009), (subscription access)
