= Paul Botten-Hansen =

Norwegian editor (1824–1869)

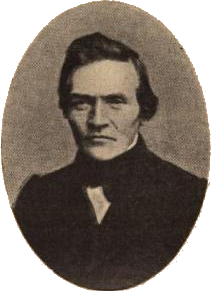
Paul Botten-Hansen

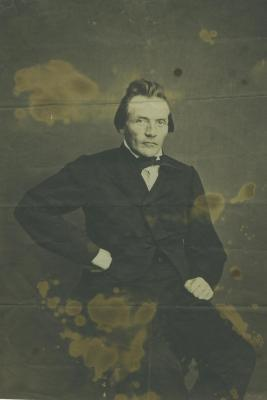
Paul Botten-Hansen

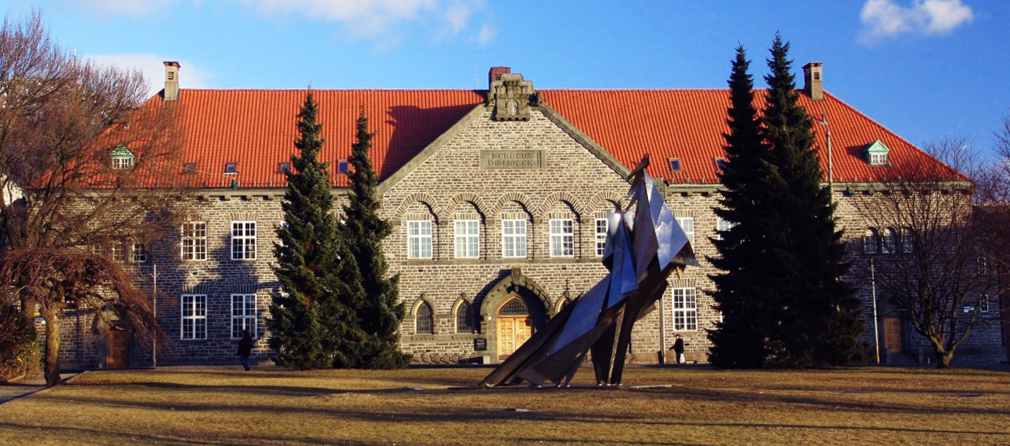
Botten-Hansen's book collection formed the basis for Bergen Public Library, established in 1874

Paul Botten-Hansen (26 December 1824 – 7 July 1869) was a Norwegian librarian, book collector, magazine editor and literary critic.

== Biography ==
Botten-Hansen was born in Sel in Christians amt (county), Norway. Born outside of wedlock to Hans Paulsen Nystuen and Ragnhild Jehansdatter Botten, he grew up with her mother's parents on their farm at Botten in Gudbrandsdalen. He moved to Lillehammer in 1839 at the age of 15 where he held office positions for the next eight years. In 1847 he moved to Christiania (now Oslo). He studied at the University of Christiania where he came into a circle of young yet unknown literary talents including Henrik Ibsen, Aasmund Olavson Vinje, and Ivar Aasen. He was a lecturer in Valdres 1847-48 and taught at a private school in Christiania 1848–51. He was co-editor of the literary magazine Andhrimner together with Henrik Ibsen and Aasmund Vinje in 1851. His fairytale drama Huldrebryllupet first appeared in Andhrimner in 1851, and elements from this play are later treated by Henrik Ibsen in the 1867 play Peer Gynt.

He edited the weekly magazine Illustreret Nyhedsblad from 1851 to 1866. He became an assistant in the National Archives of Norway (Riksarkivet) in 1856. He was head of the University of Oslo Library in Christiania (now Oslo) from 1864.

In 1861, he was married to Johanne Evine Karine Elisabeth Sang (1833–1917). They were the parents of three children. Botten-Hansen died during 1869 at age 44 and was buried at Vestre gravlund in Oslo. His book collection of 14,000 volumes was the basis for the establishment of the Bergen Public Library in 1874.
