= Augusto Novelli =

Italian writer (1867–1927)

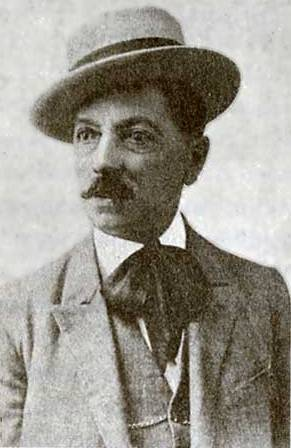
Augusto Novelli

Augusto Novelli (17 January 1867 – 7 November 1927), also known as Novellino, was an Italian Florentine satirical journalist, dramatist, and novelist.

As a prolific playwright who completed more than fifty dramatic pieces, many of which are in the Florentine dialect of the Tuscan language, Novelli is regarded as one of the founding fathers of the modern Florentine vernacular theatre.

== Biography ==
Well known for his lifelong association with the city of Florence, Augusto Novelli was born there on 17 January 1867. Largely self-educated, Novelli succeeded in becoming an erudite intellectual despite a minimal formal education that ended only after three years of primary school.

Fascinated by the creative world of the Italian theatre from an early age, Novelli managed to complete the farce Una sfida ai bagni (A Challenge to the Baths) as a teenager and wrote early plays such as La capanna del veterano (The Veteran's Cabin) and La Società dei senza testa (Society of the Headless) in the 1880s.

After founding the satirical magazine Il vero Monello (The True Rogue) and becoming its chief editor in 1888, he soon focused his attention on Florentine drama, which began to appear in Novelli's journal in the Florentine vernacular form in 1892.

As a politically active member of the intelligentsia from the beginning of his career, Novelli was around the establishment as a young man. In the 1890s, he was given a fifteen-month prison term as punishment for his adherence to the socialist movement during a period of fierce political conservatism. Despite this political martyrdom, Novelli would later be expelled by the Italian Socialist Party's radical elements for being too reformist, or impermissibly moderate.

Novelli's Il morticino (The Dead Child), a play written during his prison term, premiered in 1893 while the dramatist was still carrying on his work from behind bars. The subsequent year witnessed the debut of Novelli's Purgatorio, Inferno, Paradiso (Purgatory, Inferno, Paradise). In Britain, the Victorian era freethinker Samuel Porter Putnam observed that "Novelli. . . was cheered when acquitted on the charges of irreverence and blasphemy."

The play is regarded as Novelli's most notable theatrical work, L'acqua cheta (Still Water), first opened at Florence's Teatro Alfieri on 28 January 1908. Though since hailed as a classic masterpiece of Florentine comedy – even described as the beginning of the modern Florentine vernacular theater – the work opened to mixed critical reviews that were largely negative, at first receiving a positive review from only one critic, Mario Ferrigni. It nonetheless enjoyed an overwhelming popular success among theater-goers. The play was later turned into an operetta after receiving a musical score from composer Giuseppe Pietri. The Novelli-Pietro operetta premiered on 27 November 1920 in Rome.

The numerous other productions born out of Novelli's fruitful association with the Alfieri, included the premieres of Acqua passata (Water Under the Bridge) in 1908; Casa mia (My House), L'ascensione (The Ascension), and L'Ave Maria (Ave Maria) in 1909; Gallina vecchia (The Old Hen) in 1911; La Cupola (The Cupola) in 1913; and Canapone in 1914.

Aside from his two decades with Il vero Monello, Novelli's contributions to periodicals included material for Firenze a zig-zag in 1912 and La Kultureide in 1916. Novelli's other efforts outside of drama included the 1902 Lotte sociali (Social Struggles), an original translation of Victor Hugo's notes regarding his participation in attempts to effect social and political change in France, and Firenze presa sul serio (Florence Taken Seriously), a novel first published for the Florentine readers in 1902. Novelli's novel ultimately reappeared in a 1908 edition illustrated by Gustavo Rosso and prefaced by author and politician Otello Masini.

Among Novelli's collaborators in the theatrical world was the influential actor-manager Andrea Niccoli (1862–1917), remembered as an instrumental promoter of Novelli's L'acqua cheta and other plays.

Novelli died on 7 November 1927 in Carmignano. He was aged sixty years at the time, five years after dictator Benito Mussolini's fascist takeover of the country. He spent his final years in seclusion from public life in the Tuscan community about 20 km west of Florence, where a commemorative bust, installed in the municipal chamber, now honours him.
