= Ugo, conte di Parigi =

Opera by Gaetano Donizetti

- Opera by Gaetano Donizetti
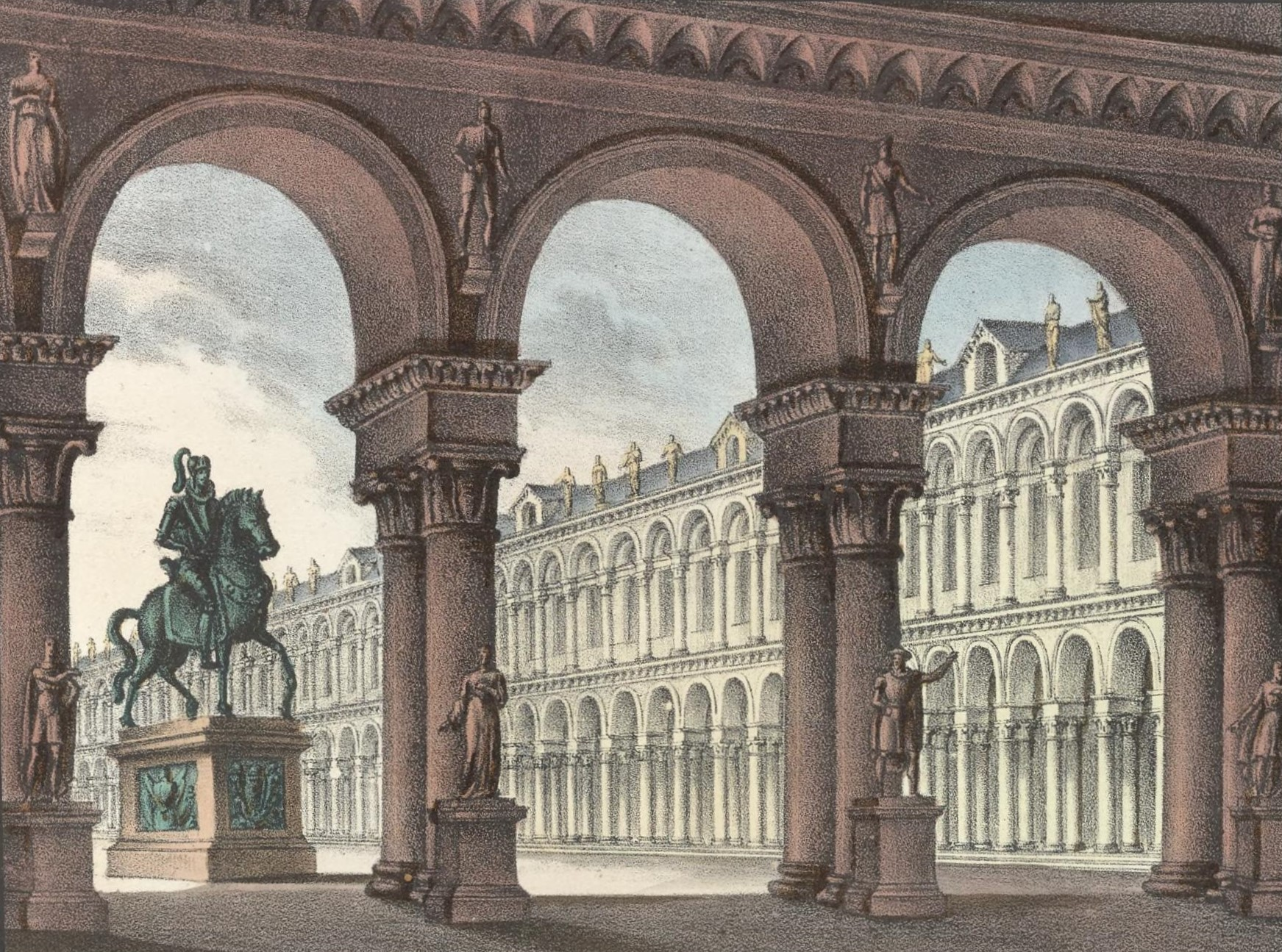
- Set design by Alessandro Sanquirico for the premiere
- Librettist: Felice Romani
- Language: Italian
- Based on: Blanche d'Aquitaine by Hippolyte Bis
- Premiere: 13 March 1832; La Scala, Milan

Ugo, conte di Parigi (Hugo, Count of Paris) is a tragedia lirica, or tragic opera, in two acts by Gaetano Donizetti. Felice Romani wrote the Italian libretto after Hippolyte-Louis-Florent Bis's Blanche d'Aquitaine. It premiered on 13 March 1832 at La Scala, Milan.

== Roles ==
Role	Voice type	Premiere cast, 13 March 1832 (Conductor: – )
Bianca	soprano	Giuditta Pasta
Adelia, Bianca's sister	soprano	Giulia Grisi
Ugo, Count of Paris	tenor	Domenico Donzelli
Folco	bass	Vincenzo Negrini
Luigi V, King of France	contralto	Clorinda Corradi Pantanelli
Emma	mezzo-soprano	Felicita Baillou-Hillaret
Knights, soldiers, band

== Synopsis ==
Time: 10th century
Place: Paris

See synopsis on opera-rara.com

== Recordings ==
Year	Cast (Bianca, Ugo, Luigi, Emma)	Conductor, Opera House and Orchestra	Label
1977	Janet Price, Maurice Arthur, Della Jones, Eiddwen Harrhy	Alun Francis, New Philharmonia Orchestra and the Geoffrey Mitchell Choir	Audio CD: Opera Rara; Cat: ORC1
2003	Doina Dimitriu, Yasuharu Nakajima, Sim Tokyurek, Milijana Nikolic	Antonino Fogliani, Orchestra and Chorus of the Teatro Donizetti, Bergamo.	Audio CD: Dynamic; Cat: CDS 449/1-2
