= Illustreret Nyhedsblad =

Norwegian weekly magazine (1851–1866)

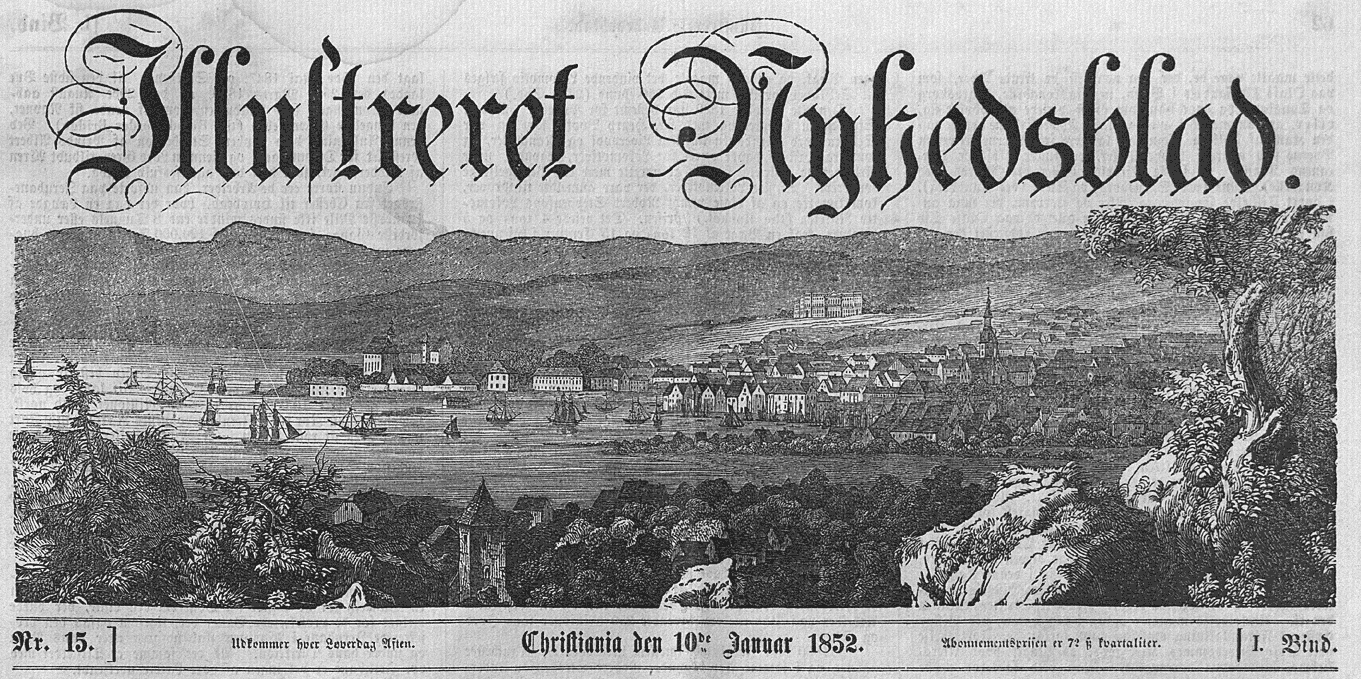
- Title vignette from 10 January 1852
- Editor: Paul Botten-Hansen; Jonas Lie; Frederik Bætzmann
- Frequency: weekly
- First issue: 1851
- Final issue: 1866
- Country: Norway
- Based in: Christiania
- Language: Norwegian

Illustreret Nyhedsblad was a Norwegian weekly magazine, issued from 1851 to 1866 in Christiania, Norway. Its first editor was Paul Botten-Hansen, who edited the magazine from 1851 to 1864 and from 1865 to 1866, with Frederik Bætzmann being editor from 1864 to 1865. Jonas Lie was the editor of the magazine from 1863 to 1864. Among its contributors were Bjørnstjerne Bjørnson, Henrik Ibsen, Ernst Sars and Camilla Collett. The latter published her writings about the visits to the European cities in the period between December 1863 and July 1864. Ibsen's plays Hærmændene paa Helgeland and Kærlighedens komedie were published as supplements to the magazine.
