= Antonio Monticini =

Italian choreographer, ballet dancer, and composer

Antonio Monticini (1792–1854) was an Italian choreographer, ballet dancer, and composer who was active in major theatres throughout Italy during the first half of the 19th century.
