= Serafino Amedeo De Ferrari =

Italian composer, conductor, organist, and pianist

Serafino Amedeo De Ferrari (6 May 1824 – 27 March 1885) was an Italian composer, conductor, organist, and pianist. He is best known for his operas, of which his most popular were Pipelè (1855) and Il Menestrello (1859).

Born in Genoa, Ferrari studied in his native city and in Milan. He performed widely as a concert organist and pianist. In 1852, he was highly active as a conductor in Amsterdam, after which he worked as the director of singing at the Teatro Carlo Felice in Genoa. He then worked in a similar capacity at the Teatro Carignano in Turin. He died in Genoa.

== Sources ==
- The Diaries of Giacomo Meyerbeer: The years of celebrity, 1850-1856 By Giacomo Meyerbeer, Robert Ignatius Letellier, Robert Ignatius Le Tellier
- Casaglia, Gherardo (2005). "Serafino Amedeo De Ferrari". L'Almanacco di Gherardo Casaglia (in Italian).
