= Samuele Levi =

Italian composer

Samuele Levi (c. 1813 – 6 January 1883) was an Italian composer born in Venice. He is best known for his four operas: Iginia d'Asti (1837, Teatro San Benedetto), Ginerva degli Almieri (1840, Teatro Comunale di Trieste), Giuditta (1844, La Fenice), and La biscagliata (1860, Teatro Carignano). He died in Florence.
