= Faust ballets =

Set of ballets choreographed between the 18th and 20th centuries

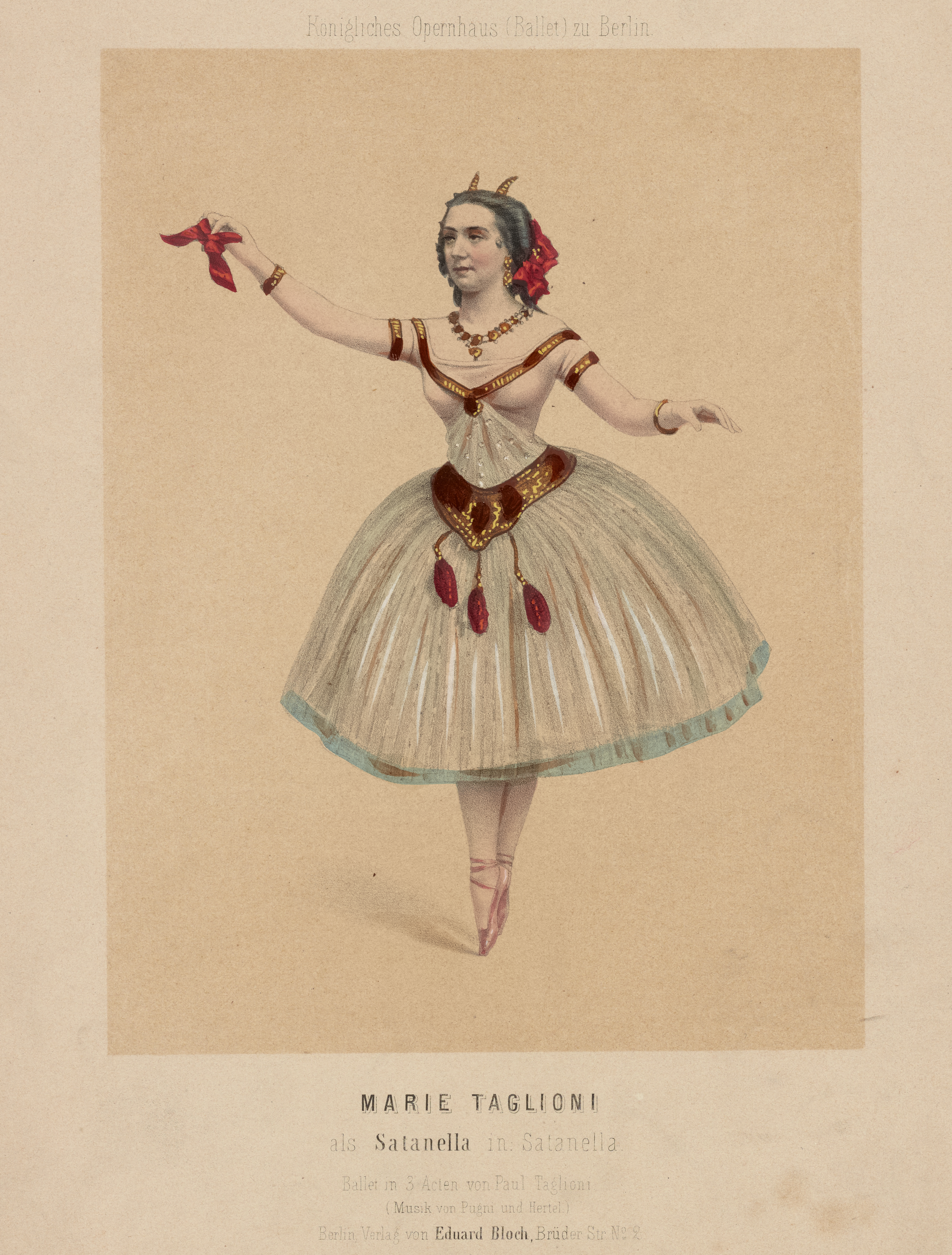
Marie Taglioni in her brother Paul Taglioni's ballet Satanella oder Metamorphosen

Faust ballets are a set of ballets, choreographed between the 18th and 20th centuries, based on the legend of Faust. As early as 1723, London-based John Rich put on a Faust-inspired ballet pantomime called The Necromancer at the Lincoln's Inn Fields Theatre. In the 19th century several productions took Faust as their subject matter including August Bournonville's 1832 production Faust for the Royal Danish Ballet.

In 1833, Andre Deshayes' Faust premiered in London with music by Adolphe Adam.

On 12 February 1848, a Faust ballet premiered at the Ballet of the Teatro alla Scala in Milan. This version featured choreography and libretto by Jules Perrot and music by Giacomo Panizza, Michael Andrew Costa, and Niccolò Bajetti, with Fanny Elssler (as Marguerite), Perrot (as Mephistophelis), Effisio Catte (as Faust), and Ekaterina Costantini (as Bambo, Queen of the Demons). Perrot revived the ballet three times between 1848 and 1854, the last featuring a revised score by Cesare Pugni. In 1867, Marius Petipa revived this version again for the Imperial Bolshoi Kamenny Theatre, St. Petersburg, using the revised Pugni score.

In 1852 Paul Taglioni, brother of Maria Taglioni (the first ballerina to dance en pointe), choreographed Satanella oder Metamorphosen with music by composed by Peter Ludwig Hertel. A few years later, Julius Reisinger's Mephistophelia premiered in Hamburg and Meyer Lutz composed the score for Joseph Lanner's 1895 production.

The trend continued into the 20th century with ballets created by Remislav Remislavsky, Heiner Luipart and female choreographer Nina Kirsanova based on an unstaged 19th century libretto Der Doktor Faust, written by Heinrich Heine. Romantic composer Berlioz's La Damnation de Faust was staged by French choreographer Maurice Béjart for the Paris Opera Ballet in 1964). Béjart's 1975 production Notre Faust was set to Bach's B minor Mass. Béjart himself danced in Notre Faust at its New York City premiere in 1977.

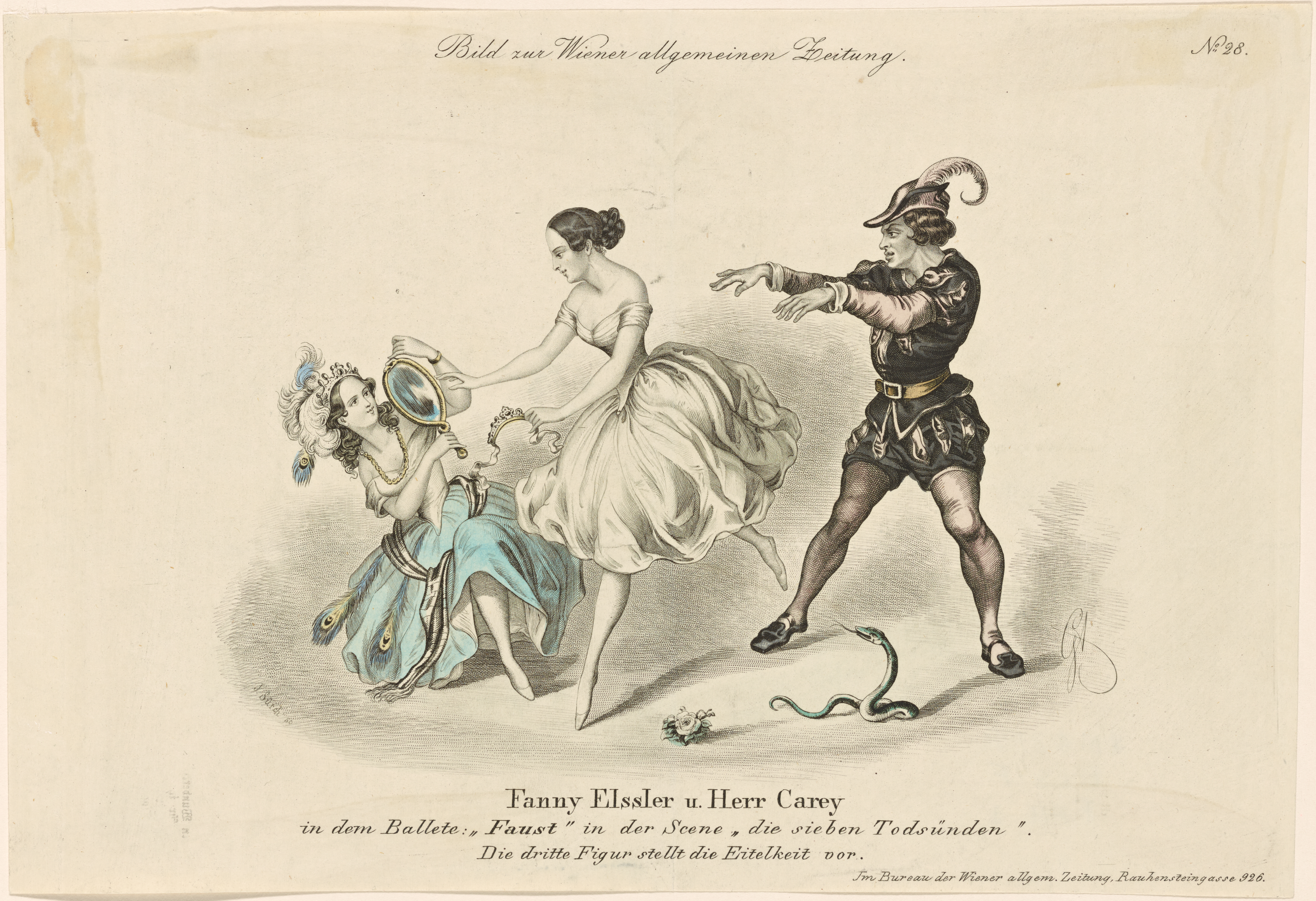
Fanny Elssler in Faust with "Herr Carey" as Mephistopheles
