= Giovanni Galzerani =

Italian composer

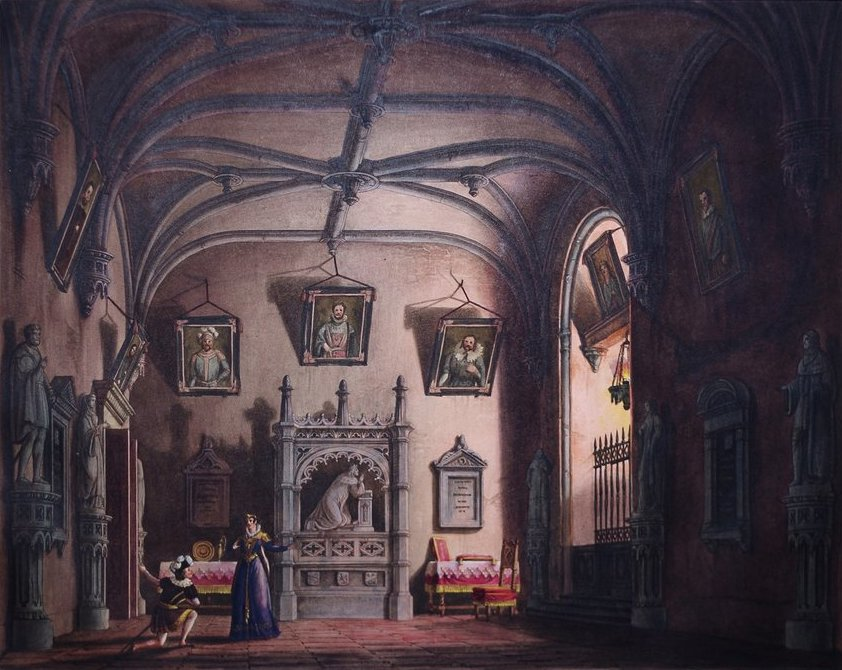
Set design by Alessandro Sanquirico for Galzerani's ballet Maria Stuarda staged at La Scala in Milan, 1826

Giovanni Galzerani (c. 1789 - after 1853) was an Italian choreographer, ballet dancer, and composer who was active in major theatres throughout Italy from 1808 to 1853. He was born in Porto Azzurro on the Isle of Elba and began his education in Gaeta where his father was the military commandant at the time. At his father's wish he enrolled in the Collegio della Nunziatella in Naples to train for a military career, remaining there until the age of 17. While at the college, he also studied ballroom dancing with Ferdinando Gioia, the brother of the celebrated dancer and choreographer Gaetano Gioia, and became one of his best pupils. After his father's death in 1806, Galzerani abandoned preparations for a military career and dedicated himself entirely to the ballet, first as a dancer and then as a choreographer. He also composed the music for some of his ballets, such as Il pericolo which premiered in 1818 at the Teatro Regio in Turin.

== Ballets ==
Ballets devised and choreographed by Galzerani include:

- Il pericolo, Giovanni Galzerani (composer), premiered Teatro Regio, Turin, 26 December 1818
- Niobe ossia La vendetta di Latona, Giovanni Pacini (composer), premiered Teatro Regio, Turin, 26 December 1818
- Ero e Leandro, Luigi Maria Viviani (composer), premiered Teatro Regio, Turin, 7 December 1823
- La conquista del Perù, Luigi Maria Viviani (composer), premiered Teatro Comunale, Bologna, 1 May 1824
- L'eroe peruviano, Luigi Maria Viviani (composer) premiered La Fenice, Venice, 26 December 1824
- Virginia, Luigi Maria Viviani (composer), premiered La Fenice, Venice, 8 February 1825
