= Teatro Alfieri, Florence =

Coordinates: 43.7712°N 11.2629°E

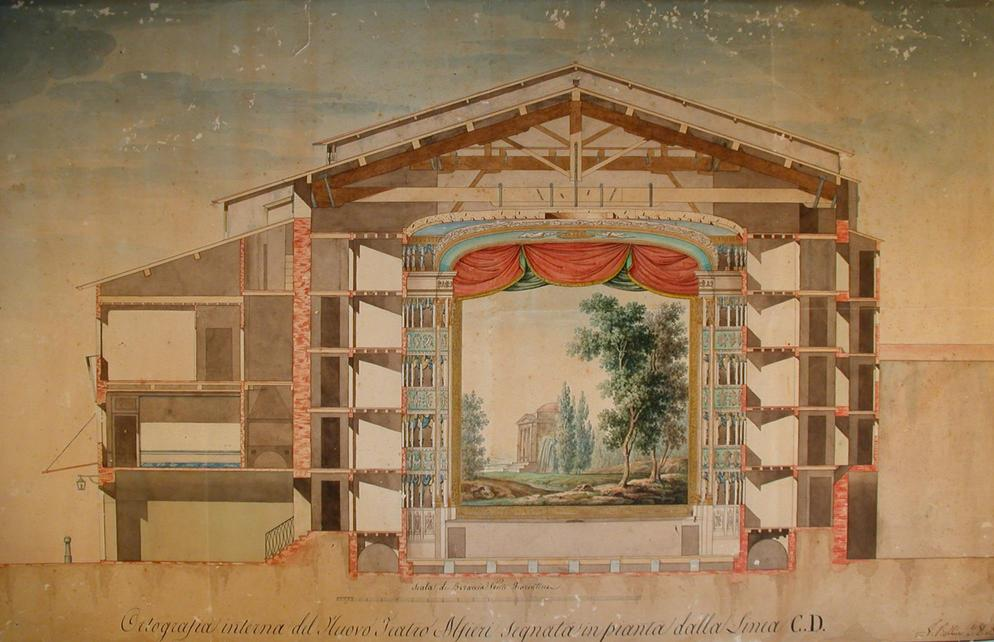
Vittorio Bellini's design for the 1828 renovation of the theatre

The Teatro Alfieri was a major theatre and opera house in 18th and 19th century Florence, located at Via dell'Ulivo #6 corner Via Pietrapiana in the Florence, region of Tuscany, Italy.

== History ==
It was constructed originally in 1740 by members of the Accademia dei Risoluti. At that time it was known as the Teatro di Santa Maria (the name of a nearby street) or the Teatro Risoluti. The theatre underwent extensive reconstruction and enlargement in 1828, supervised by the architect Vittorio Bellini (1798 - 1860). It re-opened as the Teatro Alfieri, named in honour of the playwright Vittorio Alfieri.

In its heyday, the theatre interior decorations were elaborate, was used for both prose drama and operas. In the late 19th century and early 20th centuries, it also became known as a performance venue for plays written in the Florentine dialect. The theatre was demolished in 1928 when the Fascist government of Florence re-developed the Santa Croce district.

== Premieres ==
- L'amore in guerra, opera by Luigi Maria Viviani, 8 February 1829
- Matilde a Toledo, opera by Teodulo Mabellini, 27 August 1836
- Romilda e Ezzelino, opera by Abramo Basevi, 11 August 1840
- Le educande di Sorrento, opera by Emilio Usiglio 1 May 1868
- Nozze sospirate, opera by Oreste Carlini, 10 January 1888
- Una partita a scacchi, opera by Enrico Ranfagni, 13 February 1892
- In congedo, opera by Cesare Bacchini, 1 October 1898
- Sarrona, opera by William Legrand Howland, 3 February 1906 (Italian premiere)
- L'acqua cheta, play in Florentine dialect by Augusto Novelli, 29 January 1908
- Il pateracchio, play in Florentine dialect by Ferdinando Paolieri, 2 February 1910
