= Andhrimner =

Norwegian literary magazine

- Editor: Aasmund Olavsson Vinje; Henrik Ibsen; Paul Botten-Hansen
- Categories: Literary magazine
- Frequency: Weekly
- First issue: January 1851
- Final issue: September 1851
- Country: Norway
- Based in: Kristiania
- Language: Norwegian

Andhrimner was a literary and satirical weekly magazine, issued from January to September 1851 in Kristiania, Norway.

== History and profile ==
Andhrimner was established in 1851, as Manden ("The Man"), but was later renamed after Andhrímnir of Norse mythology. Its editors were Aasmund Olavsson Vinje, Henrik Johan Ibsen and Paul Botten-Hansen. Some of Ibsen's early literary attempts were published in this magazine, under the pseudonym Brynjulf Bjarme, such as his poem Bjergmanden and the parody play Norma.

Even though it was a literary magazine first and foremost, it was also noted for its satire. It is regarded as Norway's second satirical magazine, after Krydseren.
