= Giovanni Bajetti =

Italian violinist, conductor, and composer

Giovanni Bajetti was an Italian violinist, conductor, and dramatic composer. He was born in Brescia about 1815 and died in Milan in 1876.

Bajetti studied at the Milan Conservatory and conducted at La Scala. Upon his death, he left several unfinished works, included a comic opera, La Donna Romantica.
