= Francesco Maria Piave =

Italian opera librettist (1812–1876)

Francesco Maria Piave

Francesco Maria Piave (18 May 1810 – 5 March 1876) was an Italian opera librettist who was born in Murano in the lagoon of Venice, during the brief Napoleonic Kingdom of Italy.

== Career ==
Piave's career spanned over twenty years working with many of the significant composers of his day, including Giovanni Pacini (four librettos), Saverio Mercadante (at least one), Federico Ricci, and even one for Michael Balfe. He is most known for his collaborations with Giuseppe Verdi, for whom he was to write 10 librettos, the best known being those for Rigoletto and La traviata.

But Piave was not only a librettist: he was a journalist and translator in addition to being the resident poet and stage manager at La Fenice in Venice where he first encountered Verdi. Later, Verdi was helpful in securing him the same position at La Scala in Milan. His expertise as a stage manager and his tact as a negotiator served Verdi very well, but the composer bullied him mercilessly for his pains over many years.

Like Verdi, Piave was an ardent Italian patriot, and in 1848, during Milan's "Cinque Giornate," when Radetzky's Austrian troops retreated from the city, Verdi wrote to Piave in Venice addressing him as "Citizen Piave."

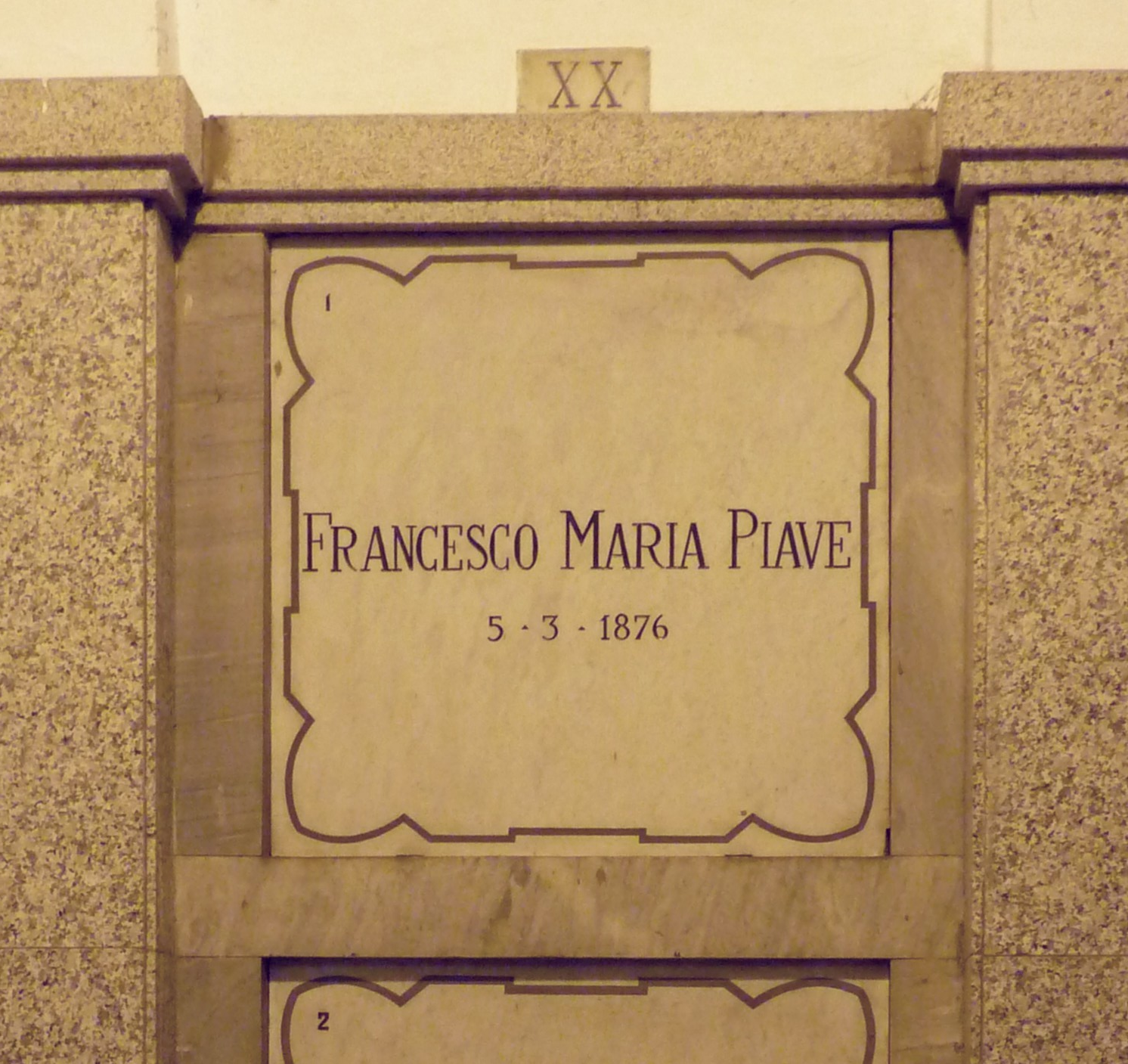
Piave's grave at the Monumental Cemetery of Milan

Together, they worked on ten operas between 1844 and 1862, and Piave would have also prepared the libretto for Aida when Verdi accepted the commission for it in 1870, had he not suffered a stroke which left him paralyzed and unable to speak. Verdi helped to support his wife and daughter, proposing that "an album of pieces by famous composers be compiled and sold for Piave's benefit". The composer paid for his funeral when he died nine years later in Milan aged 65 and arranged for his burial at the Monumental Cemetery.

== Piave's librettos for Verdi ==
From the beginnings of their working relationship in 1844, scholars such as Gabriele Baldini see Verdi's overall influence upon the structure of his work take a big leap forward when he notes:

Working with Piave was Verdi's first opportunity to work with himself. [...] The composer completely dominates and enslaves the librettist, who becomes scarcely more than an instrument in his hands...[Piave's] libretti are in fact those best suited to Verdi's music [....] simply because, in detail as well as in general shape, Verdi himself composed them.

This statement suggests that, almost for the first time, the composer was going to be the one who determined "that drama essentially consisted of the arrangement of pieces and the clarity of the musical forms..[so that]..he began to become aware of the structure and architecture of musical composition, something which was not even clearly hinted at during the period with Solera. The composer began to control the overall dramatic arc of the drama and no longer would he "suffer under" such librettists as Temistocle Solera, who wrote the libretti for five Verdi operas beginning with Oberto and up to Attila in 1846.

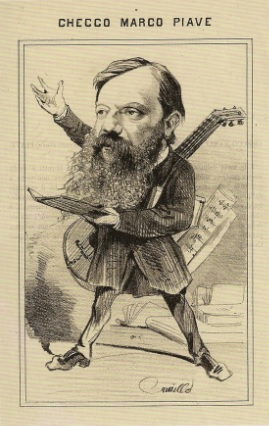
Caricature of Piave as "a theatrical jack-of-all-trades", after 1861

An example of the pressure which Verdi exerted on Piave was in the struggle to have the Venetian censors approve Rigoletto: "Turn Venice upside down to make the censors permit this subject" he demanded, following that up with the admonition not to allow the matter to drag on: "If I were the poet I would be very, very concerned, all the more because you would be greatly responsible if by chance (may the Devil not make it happen) they should not allow this drama [to be staged]".

Another Verdi scholar notes that "Verdi always harried him unmercifully, often having his work revised by others [but] Piave rewarded him with doglike devotion, and the two remained on terms of sincere friendship." Piave became "someone Verdi loved".

In following Salvadore Cammarano as Verdi's main mid-career librettist, Piave firstly wrote Ernani in 1844, and then I due Foscari (1844), Attila (1846), Macbeth (the 1847 first version), Il Corsaro (1848), Stiffelio (1850), Rigoletto (1851), La traviata (1853), Simon Boccanegra (the 1857 first version), Aroldo (1857), La forza del destino (the 1862 first version), and Macbeth (the 1865 second version).

== Librettos by Piave ==
Year	Title	Composer
1842	Il duca d'Alba	Giovanni Pacini (Libretto also used by Giovanni Peruzzini)
1844	Ernani	Giuseppe Verdi
1844	I due Foscari	Giuseppe Verdi
1845	Lorenzino de' Medici	Giovanni Pacini
1846	Attila	Giuseppe Verdi
1846	Estella di Murcia	Federico Ricci
1847	Griselda	Federico Ricci
1847	Macbeth (first version)	Giuseppe Verdi
1847	Tutti amanti	Carlo Romani
1848	Allan Cameron	Giovanni Pacini
1848	Giovanna di Fiandra	Carlo Boniforti
1848	Il corsaro	Giuseppe Verdi
1848	Il campo de' crociati	Saverio Mercadante
1850	Crispino e la comare	Luigi Ricci and Federico Ricci
1850	Elisabetta di Valois	Antonio Buzzolla
1850	Stiffelio	Giuseppe Verdi
1851	La Sposa di Murçia	Andrea Casalini
1851	Rigoletto	Giuseppe Verdi
1853	Baschina	Federico Guglielmo De Liguoro
1853	La donna delle isole	Giovanni Pacini
1853	La prigioniera	Carlo Ercole Bosoni
1853	La traviata	Giuseppe Verdi
1854	Margherita di Borgogna	Francesco Petrocini
1854	Pittore e Duca	Michael William Balfe
1856	I Fidanzati	Achille Peri
1857	Simon Boccanegra (first version)	Giuseppe Verdi
1857	Aroldo (revision of Stiffelio)	Giuseppe Verdi
1857	Vittore Pisani	Achille Peri
1859	Margherita la mendicante	Gaetano Braga
1860	La Biscaglina	Samuele Levi
1861	Guglielmo Shakspeare	Tomaso Benvenuti
1862	La forza del destino (first version)	Giuseppe Verdi
1862	Mormile	Gaetano Braga
1862	Rienzi	Achille Peri
1865	La Duchessa di Guisa	Paolo Serrao
1865	Macbeth (second version)	Giuseppe Verdi
1865	Rebecca	Bartolomeo Pisani
1867	Berta di Varnol	Giovanni Pacini
1867	Don Diego de Mendoza	Giovanni Pacini
1868	La tombola	Antonio Cagnoni
1872	Olema	Carlo Pedrotti

== Filmography ==
- Crispino e la comare, directed by Vincenzo Sorelli (1938)
- Rigoletto, directed by Carmine Gallone (1946)
- La signora delle camelie, directed by Carmine Gallone (1947)
- The Force of Destiny, directed by Carmine Gallone (1950)
- Rigoletto e la sua tragedia, directed by Flavio Calzavara (1956)
- La traviata, directed by Mario Lanfranchi (1968)
- Rigoletto, directed by Jean-Pierre Ponnelle (1982)
- La Traviata, directed by Franco Zeffirelli (1983)
- Macbeth, directed by Claude d'Anna (1987)
- Giuseppe Verdi's Rigoletto Story, directed by Gianfranco Fozzi (2005)
