= Achille De Bassini =

Italian opera singer (1819–1881)

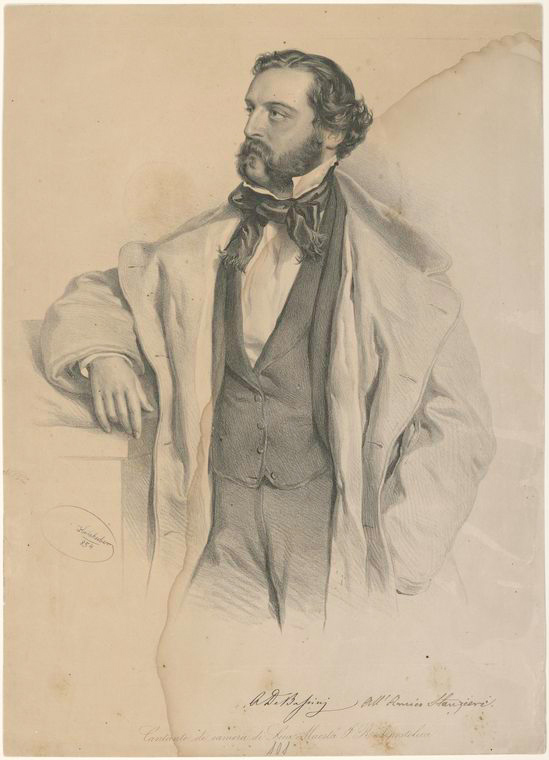
Achille De Bassini; Lithograph by Josef Kriehuber, 1854

Achille De Bassini (5 May 1819 – 3 July 1881) was an Italian baritone, particularly noted for his performances in Verdi's operas. He created the roles of Francesco Foscari in I due Foscari (1844), Pasha Seid in Il corsaro (1848), Miller in Luisa Miller (1849) and Fra Melitone in La forza del destino (1862).

Bassini was born and studied in Milan, and is thought to have made his début at Voghera in 1837 in the title role of Donizetti's Belisario. Although he had a talent for portraying noble, suffering characters, Verdi also recognized his capacity for humorous roles and wrote the character of Fra Melitone specifically for him. He sang throughout Italy and from 1852 to 1863 in Saint Petersburg as well. He made his London debut in Covent Garden in 1859.

De Bassini was married to the soprano Rita Gabussi. Their son, Alberto De Bassini, was also an opera singer, first as a tenor, and later as a baritone. Achille died, aged 62, at Cava de' Tirreni.

== Sources ==
- J. Warrack and E. West, 'De Bassini, Achille', The Concise Oxford Dictionary of Opera, 2nd Edition, Oxford University Press, 1992.
- Francesco Regli, Dizionario biografico dei più celebri poeti ed artisti melodrammatici, E. Dalmazzo, 1860, pp. 151–152
