= I due Foscari =

3 act opera by Verdi

- Opera by Giuseppe Verdi
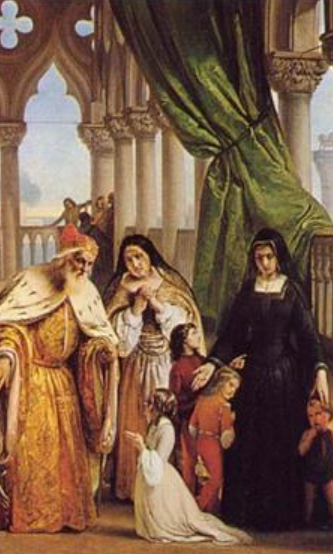
- Librettist: Francesco Maria Piave
- Language: Italian
- Based on: Lord Byron's historical play, The Two Foscari
- Premiere: 3 November 1844; Teatro Argentina, Rome

I due Foscari (The Two Foscari) is an opera in three acts by Giuseppe Verdi to an Italian libretto by Francesco Maria Piave, based on the 1821 historical play, The Two Foscari by Lord Byron.

After his success with Ernani, Verdi received a commission from Rome's Teatro Argentina and he went to work with Piave in considering two subjects, one of which eventually became this opera. I due Foscari was given its premiere performance in Rome on 3 November 1844 and was generally quite successful, although not on the scale of Ernani, which remained Verdi's most popular opera until Il trovatore in 1853.

== Composition history ==
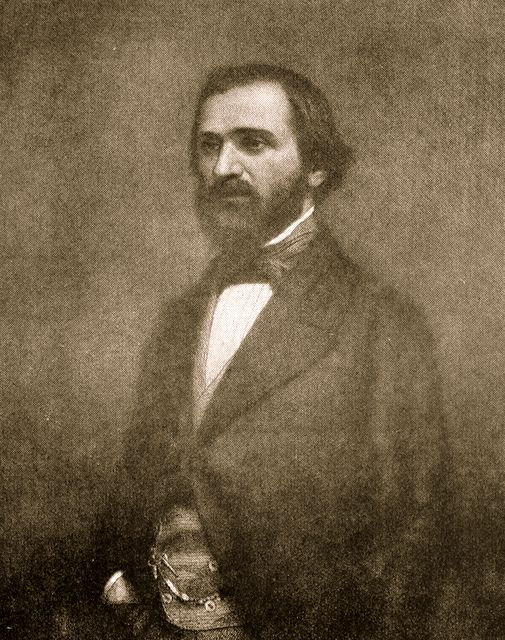
Giuseppe Verdi

After Ernani, Verdi had considered a large number of projects for the future and the Byron play was one of them. Foscari had even been considered as early as 1843 when he had been approached by La Fenice in Venice, but it was rejected as unsuitable because the story included criticism of actions of the Republic of Venice which may have been offensive to the great families who had governed the Republic, including the extant Foscari family.

At the same time, the composer had accepted a commission from the Teatro Argentina in Rome and had considered the subject of Lorenzino de' Medici on which Piave had already begun work. Verdi encouraged the librettist to continue his work and then submit the work to the Roman authorities but, as a backup, he wrote: "But, just in case the police don't allow it, we'll have to think of a quick alternative and I suggest The Two Foscari. I like the plot and the outline is already there in Venice." It appears that Verdi had already submitted it to La Fenice at some earlier time, and so he encouraged Piave to work on it, "but stick closely to Byron" he noted.

As it turned out, the de Medici libretto was rejected by the Teatro Argentina and I due Foscari was substituted. This gave Verdi the opportunity to re-read Byron's play and, in doing so, he came to the realization (which he expressed in a letter to Piave) that the librettist had better NOT 'stick close to Byron': "...the play does not quite have the theatrical grandeur needed for an opera; so rack your brains and try to find something which will make a bit of a splash particularly in the first act" and he continues by stressing that "it's a fine subject, delicate and full of pathos"." Thus, the rather lower key of the original piece stood out in direct contrast to the opera by which it was succeeded. However, as musicologist Roger Parker notes, it appears that Verdi was "concentrating on personal confrontations rather than grand scenic effects".

Upon receiving the libretto by mid-May, the composer sent a long series of letters to the librettist over several months instructing him on many points where changes were needed. They revealed "the extent to which Verdi intervened in the making of the libretto, a good deal of the large-scale structure of the opera being dictated by his increasingly exigent theatrical instincts." With the music completed over the summer, I due Foscari was given its Rome premiere performance on 3 November 1844.

== Performance history ==
19th century

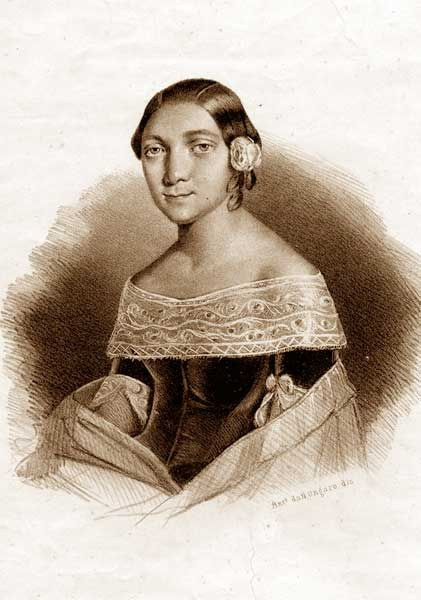
Soprano Marianna Barbieri-Nini, the first Lucrezia

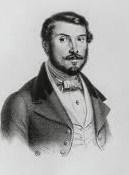
Tenor Giacomo Roppa, the first Jacopo

Reaction to the premiere was tempered by several elements outside of Verdi's control, including the recent rise in seat prices by the management and the rather lackluster quality of the performers' voices. But the reception given to the composer by the management was very enthusiastic as was that of some of the press, especially the critic of Rivista di Roma who noted that "even more than in Ernani, Verdi has endeavoured to shake off his former manner, to return to the springs of passion and affection".

Until the 1860s, the opera was seen in Italy in at least 22 towns and cities, including Livorno, Trieste, Naples, Parma, Bergamo, Teatro Carignano in Torino, Bologna, Catania, Florence, Cremona, Milan, and Modena through the 1846 season. It appeared in Barcelona in 1845 (July), in Lisbon, and Paris in 1846, in Venezia, and Prato in 1847, and in Palermo and Teatro Regio (Turin) between 1850 and 1851.

The first performances in the UK were given in London at Her Majesty's Theatre on 10 April 1847. In the US, the opera was first presented in Boston on 10 May 1847. Paris saw a production in December 1846 at the Théâtre des Italiens, and it was taken up by several major Italian opera houses.

20th century and beyond

In modern times Foscari has received numerous productions. There was a flurry after the Second World War (Vienna, Barcelona, London, Leningrad, New York), and following a La Fenice staging in 1957 with Leyla Gencer under Tullio Serafin, Piero Cappuccilli led many performances around Italy at the end of that decade and the during the next, with the 1968 Rome production being taken up at the Metropolitan and in Chicago. In 1977 was performed in Barcelona Liceu with Vicente Sardinero and Pedro Lavirgen.

La Scala presented it in 1988, also with Renato Bruson, a version which is available on DVD. It was performed by the Teatro di San Carlo in Naples in 2000 and recorded on DVD. The Royal Opera presented the opera in June 1995 with Vladimir Chernov and June Anderson in the major roles. Florida's Sarasota Opera included it in March 2008 as part of its "Verdi Cycle". It was presented during the 2008/09 seasons of La Scala and the Bilbao Association of Lovers of Opera (ABAO) in Bilbao, Spain.

Also, concert opera performances have been common. The Opera Orchestra of New York has presented concert versions three times: the first in October 1981 with Renato Bruson in the title role; the second in April 1992 with Vladimir Chernov as the Doge; and the third in December 2007, with Paolo Gavanelli as the Doge.

The Los Angeles Opera presented a new production in September 2012, with the company's general director and tenor Plácido Domingo singing the baritone role of Francesco Foscari for the first time. Performances were conducted by the company's music director, James Conlon. The production was directed by Thaddeus Strassberger in his debut for the Los Angeles company.

Today Foscari is regularly performed both in staged productions and concert versions.

== Roles ==
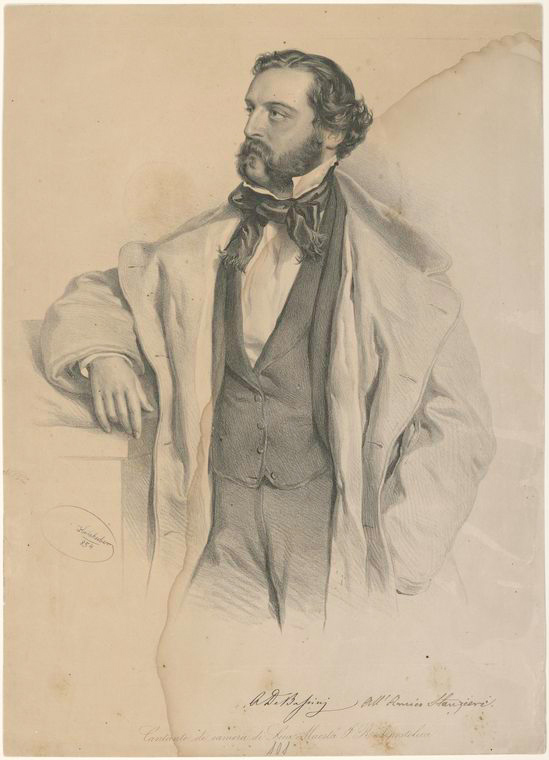
Baritone Achille De Bassini, the first Francesco. (Litho: Josef Kriehuber, 1854)

Role	Voice type	Premiere cast, 3 November 1844 (Conductor: – )
Francesco Foscari, Doge of Venice	baritone	Achille De Bassini
Jacopo Foscari, his son	tenor	Giacomo Roppa
Lucrezia Contarini, Jacopo Foscari's wife	soprano	Marianna Barbieri-Nini
Jacopo Loredano, Member of the Council of Ten	bass	Baldassare Miri
Barbarigo, a Senator	tenor	Atanasio Pozzolini
Pisana, Friend and confidant of Lucrezia	mezzo-soprano	Giulia Ricci
Attendant on the Council of Ten	tenor	
Servant of the Doge	bass	
Members of the Council of Ten and the Junta, Maidservants of Lucrezia, Venetian Ladies, crowd and masked men and women; Jailors, Gondoliers, Pages, and the two sons of Jacopo Foscari

== Synopsis ==
Francesco Maria Piave, librettist of the opera

Place: Venice
Time: 1457

=== Act 1 ===
Scene 1: Outside the Council Chamber of the Doge's Palace

Members of the Council of Ten are waiting to enter the Council Chamber to try the case of Jacopo Foscari, the son of the Doge, who has been accused of murder. Upon the arrival of Loredano (Jacopo's sworn enemy) and his friend Barbarigo, they announce that the Doge has already entered the Chamber. They all enter the Chamber.

Having recently returned from exile, Jacopo is brought from the prison and expresses his love at seeing Venice again: Dal più remoto esilio / "From the most distant place of exile". When summoned to enter the Chamber and told that he can expect the council to be merciful, Jacopo explodes in rage: Odio solo ed odio atroce / "Only hatred, cruel hatred, is locked within their breasts". He enters the Chamber.

Scene 2: A hall in the palace

Lucrezia Contarini, Jacopo's wife, learns from her ladies in waiting that the trial is proceeding in the Council Chamber. She quickly demands to see the Doge, Jacopo's father, but is told that she should pray for Jacopo's freedom. Angrily, she implores heaven to be merciful: Tu al cui sguardo onnipossente / "Thou beneath whose almighty glance all men rejoice or weep". Her friend Pisana enters in tears; she relays the news that Jacopo has been sentenced to further exile and this provokes another furious outburst from Lucrezia: La clemenza! s'aggiunge lo scherno! / "Their mercy? Now they add insult!". Pisana and the ladies beg her to trust in the mercy of God.

Scene 3: Outside the Council Chamber

The Council of Ten leaves the Chamber proclaiming that the evidence was clearly sufficient to convict Jacopo and that their actions will be seen as just and fair.

Scene 4: The Doge's private room

The Doge, Francesco Foscari, enters and wearily sits down. He expresses anguish at what has happened to his son but, as his father, feels there is nothing he can do to save him: O vecchio cor che batte / "Oh ancient heart that beats in my breast...". In tears, Lucrezia comes in and, when she tries to decry the actions of the council, Francesco reminds her of his position as upholder of the law of Venice. Angrily, she denounces the law as being filled only with hatred and vengeance and demands that he return her husband to her: Tu pur lo sai che giudice / "You know it all too well". The scene ends with the Doge lamenting the limits of his power and the conflicts between being both ruler and father, while Lucrezia continues to demand his help. The sight of his tears gives her some hope.

=== Act 2 ===
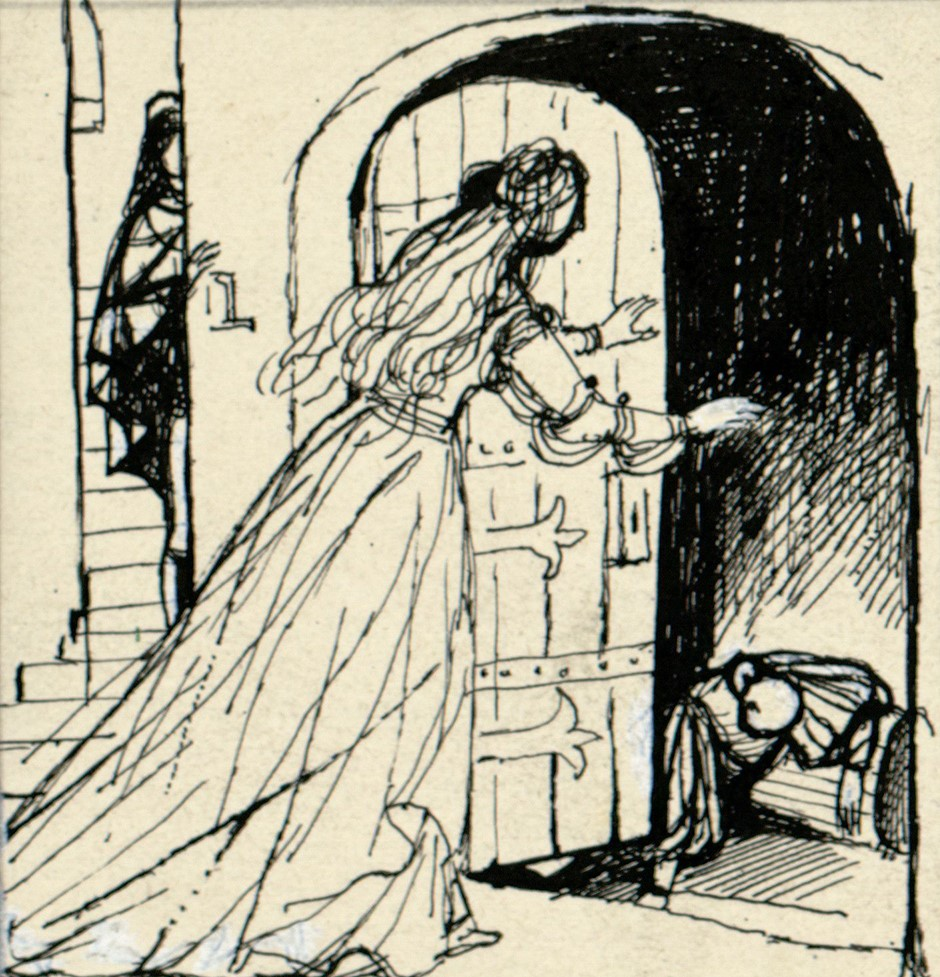
Disegno per copertina di libretto, drawing for I due Foscari (undated).

Scene 1: The state prison

Jacopo is alone in prison and laments his fate. He imagines that he is being attacked by Carmagnola, a famous condottiere (soldier) who was executed in Venice (Non maledirmi o prode / "Mighty warrior, do not curse me", and he faints. Still delirious, he finds Lucrezia is with him; she tells him of the council's decision and the punishment of further exile. However, she tries to keep some hope alive and promises to join him in exile if need be.

The Doge arrives and declares that in spite of the fact that he was forced to act severely, he loves his son. Jacopo is comforted – Nel tuo paterno amplesso / "In a father's embrace my sorrow is stilled" – but is further disturbed by the Doge's claim that his duty must override his love of his son.

Loredano arrives to announce the official verdict and to prepare Jacopo for his departure. He is contemptuous of the pleas of the Foscari and orders his men to remove Jacopo from his cell. In a final trio, Jacopo, the Doge, and Lucrezia express their conflicting emotions and, as Jacopo is taken away, father and daughter-in-law leave together.

Scene 2: The Council Chamber

Loredano is adamant: there shall be no mercy and Lucrezia and her children will not be allowed to accompany Jacopo on his banishment. The Doge laments his inability to help, acting, as he must, in the role of Doge before that of father. Lucrezia enters with her two children. Jacopo embraces them while Lucrezia pleads with the councilors to no avail. Jacopo is taken away.

=== Act 3 ===
Scene 1: The Piazetta of San Marco

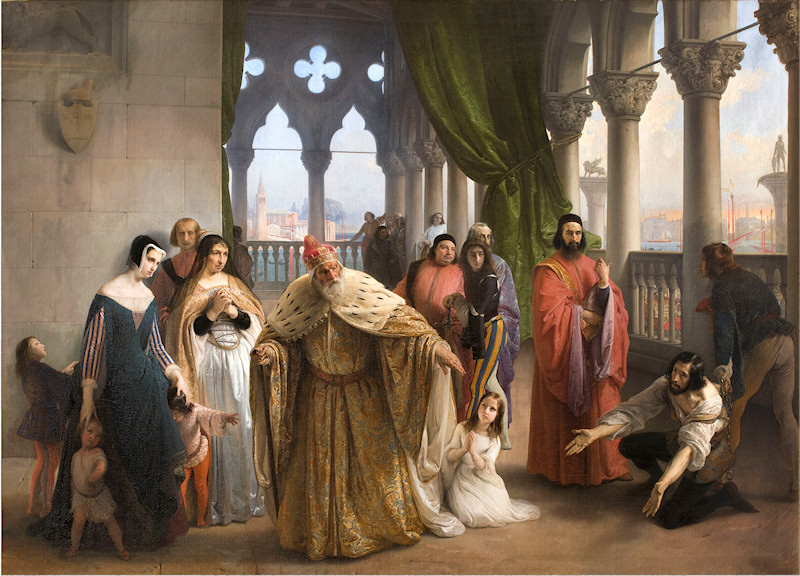
The Last Meeting Between Jacopo Foscari and his Family Before Leaving into Exile, Francesco Hayez, 1838–40

While the people who have gathered express their joy at being together, Loredano and Barbarigo wait for the galley that will take Jacopo away to exile. He is led out, followed by his wife and Pisana, and expresses his feelings for Lucrezia: All'infelice veglio / "Unhappy woman, unhappy through me alone". Together, in a huge choral number, Jacopo, Lucrezia, Pisana, Barbarigo, Loredano, and the people of Venice each express their feelings. Jacopo begins: O padre, figli, sposa / "Father, children, wife, I bid you a last farewell", and the scene ends with Jacopo escorted onto the galley while Lucrezia faints in Pisana's arms.

Scene 2: The Doge's Palace

The grief-stricken Doge expresses his feelings – Egli ora parte! ("Now he is going!") – and pictures himself alone in his old age. Barbarigo brings him proof that his son was in fact innocent, while Lucrezia comes in to announce Jacopo's death: Più non vive... l'innocente / "He is no more... the innocent". As she leaves, a servant announces that the Council of Ten wish to meet with the Doge.

The council, through its spokesman Loredano, announces that it has decided that Francesco, due to age, should give up his position as Doge. Angrily, he denounces their decision: Questa dunque è l'iniqua mercede / "This then is the unjust reward...". He asks for his daughter-in-law to be brought in and gradually lays down the trappings of his office. When Lucrezia enters and addresses him with the familiar title "Prince", he declares "Prince! That I was; now I am no longer." Just then, the bell of San Marco is heard announcing that a successor has been chosen. As it tolls a second time, Francesco recognizes that the end has come: Quel bronzo feral / "What fatal knell". As the bell tolls again, he dies; Loredano notes that "I am paid."

== Music ==
"No other of Verdi's early operas, apart from Macbeth, so effectively cuts the Gordian Knot of tradition," so Budden tells us.

What does he mean? He goes on to explain that "not one of the cabalettas begins with the usual instrumental anticipation...[....].. the numbers are welded together with greater coherence even than Ernani...[....and...].. the scoring is more sensitive than in any of the operas previously written and a good many written after..." In all, Foscari is more of a step forward than might be initially imagined.

David Kimbell writing in The New Penguin Opera Guide, clarifies some of these elements in the following ways:

Each of the principals – the Doge, Jacopo and Lucrezia – is given a distinctive orchestral theme, which accompanies them at each of their most important appearances on stage. A fourth recurring theme, this time vocal in origin ("Silenzio, mistero") is associated with the Council of Ten.

He concludes with the idea that "this opera remains one of the composer's most intimate and introspective scores", but it is left to Roger Parker to sum it all up:

Perhaps the most striking is the use of recurring themes to identify the principals. These proto 'leitmotifs' are here applied too rigidly..[...].. but the experiment itself is significant, suggesting that Verdi was anxious to explore new means of musical and dramatic articulation...Verdi's awareness of the potential of this added dimension in musical drama was decisive; from this time onwards he would rarely employ local colour in quite the mechanical way he had in his earliest operas.

== Recordings ==
Year	Cast (Francesco Foscari, Jacobo Foscari, Lucrezia, Loredano)	Conductor, Opera House and Orchestra	Label
1951	Giangiacomo Guelfi, Carlo Bergonzi, Maria Vitale, Pasquale Lombardo	Carlo Maria Giulini, RAI of Milan Orchestra and chorus	CD :Warner Fonit; Cat: 8573–83515–2
1957	Giangiacomo Guelfi, Mirto Picchi, Leyla Gencer, Alessandro Maddalena	Tullio Serafin; Chorus and orchestra of La Fenice	CD: MYTO; Cat: MCD00123
1977	Piero Cappuccilli, José Carreras, Katia Ricciarelli, Samuel Ramey	Lamberto Gardelli, ORF Symphony Orchestra and Chorus	CD: Philips; Cat: 475–8697
1988	Renato Bruson, Alberto Cupido, Linda Roark-Strummer, Luigi Roni	Gianandrea Gavazzeni, Teatro alla Scala Orchestra and Chorus (Live recording made at two performances at La Scala, 15 & 17 January)	DVD: Opus Arte; Cat: OA LS30007 D
1998	Renato Bruson, Nicola Martinetti, Lorenza Canepa, Armando Caforio	Maurizio Arena, Teatro Regio di Torino Orchestra and Chorus (Live recording made during a performance at the Teatro Regio di Torino, 14 December 1984)	CD: Nuova Era; Cat: 7297/98
2000	Leo Nucci, Vincenzo La Scola, Alexandrina Pendatchanska, Danilo Rigosa	Nello Santi, Teatro di San Carlo Orchestra and Chorus (Audio and video recordings of a performance in the Teatro di San Carlo di Napoli, November 2000).	DVD: ArtHaus Musik; Cat: 107 001
2009	Leo Nucci, Roberto de Biasio, Tatiana Serjan, Roberto Tagliavini	Donato Renzetti, Teatro Regio di Parma (Recording of a performance at the Teatro Regio)	DVD: C Major; Cat:721008
2018	Leo Nucci, Guanqun Yu, Ivan Magri, Bernadett Fodor	Ivan Repušić, Münicher Rundfunkorchester und Chor des Bayerischen Rundfunks, November 2018	CD:BR-KLASSIC Cat:90328
2020	Vladimir Stoyanov, Stefan Pop, Maria Katzarava, Giacomo Prestia	Paolo Arrivabeni, Chorus of the Teatro Regio di Parma, Filarmonica Arturo Toscanini	DVD:Dynamic Records; Cat:57865
