= Il corsaro =

Opera in three acts by Giuseppe Verdi

- Opera by Giuseppe Verdi
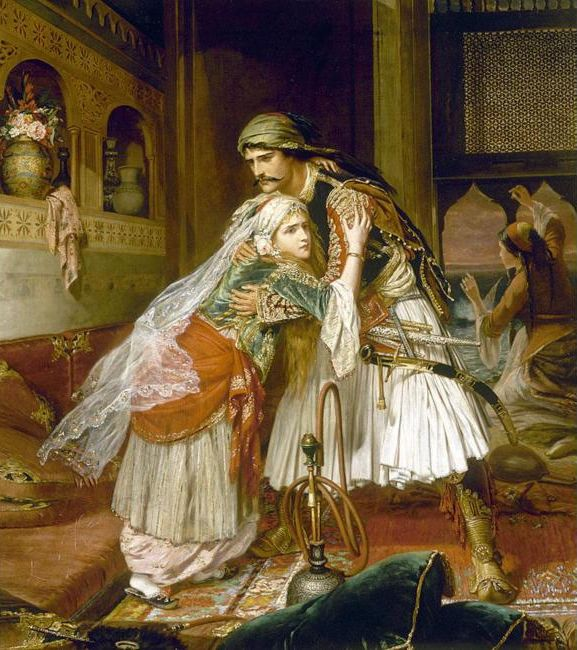
- The Parting Of Corrado and Medora
- Librettist: Francesco Maria Piave
- Language: Italian
- Based on: Lord Byron's poem The Corsair
- Premiere: 25 October 1848; Teatro Grande, Trieste

Il corsaro (The Corsair) is an opera in three acts by Giuseppe Verdi, from a libretto by Francesco Maria Piave, based on Lord Byron's 1814 poem The Corsair. The first performance was given at the Teatro Grande in Trieste on 25 October 1848.

== Composition history ==
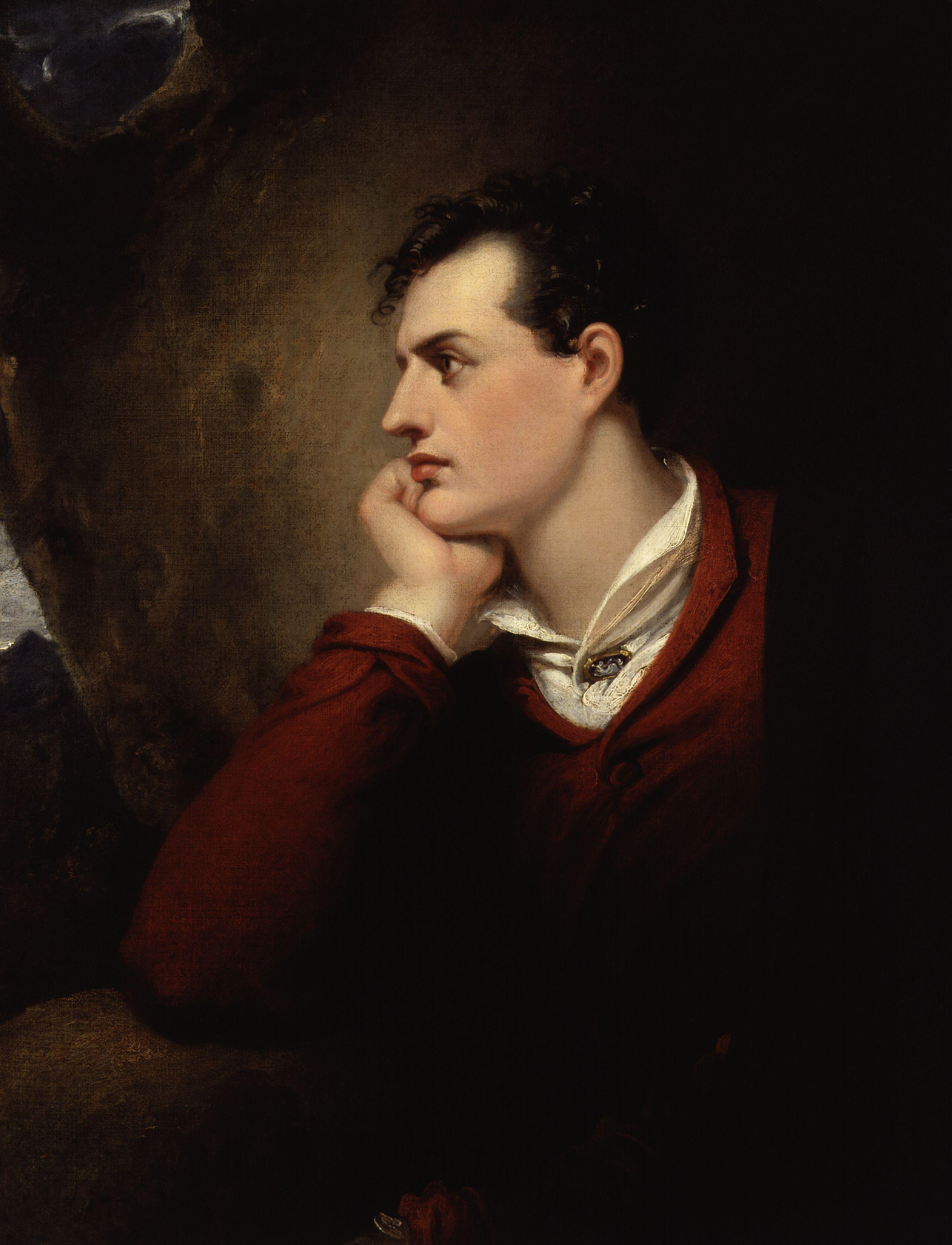
Lord Byron, by Richard Westall

Librettist Francesco Maria Piave

The composer expressed interest in Byron's poem The Corsair (along with The Two Foscari and others) as early as 1844 when he was planning an opera for Venice, but a suitable baritone was not available. In 1845, before it was determined that I masnadieri was to be the opera presented in London, the composer had contracted with the Milanese publisher, Francesco Lucca, for three operas, including Attila and one for London.

Three things prevented it from being I masnadieri at that time: firstly, Verdi's illness postponed any opera for London for almost a year; secondly, he demanded that the work be Il corsaro and that it be written by Piave, who had begun work; and, thirdly, by 1846 and the planning for London continuing, Verdi became more interested in I masnadieri or Macbeth ("in that order" notes Budden), but with the long-term view being that one of them would be for Florence.

However, Verdi had not lost sight of Corsaro at all, as is demonstrated in a letter he wrote to Piave. Impatient because of the delays, Piave had asked for his libretto to be returned to him in order that he might fulfill another commitment. Verdi was shocked: "Give you back Il corsaro, that Corsaro which has always fascinated me and which I've thought about so much, and which you've put into verse with more than your usual care?" The composer continues to explain details of the work on the music he has already done, but notes "I still have to write the opera for Lucca." Piave relented, and he moved ahead on Macbeth's libretto. But, by the end of the year, when Lucca and the British impresario, Benjamin Lumley were raising the issue of the London contract, Verdi replied that he found Il corsaro "dull (freddo) and theatrically ineffective".

Thus, I masnadieri became the opera for London, and Verdi (and his long-time assistant and student, Emanuele Muzio) traveled to that city at the end of May 1847 for the premiere performance which was held on 22 July 1847, after which the composer returned to Paris – where he remained for two years – while Muzio returned to Milan. After the Masnadieri, in order to satisfy the remaining opera contracted with Lucca, Verdi proposed Il corsaro, was offered a counter proposal which he rejected, and from Paris in February 1848 Verdi sent the completed score to Lucca via Muzio. Budden comments "In no other opera of his does Verdi appear to have taken so little interest before it was staged". Where and when it was to be staged, who the singers would be, and by which stage director was left to the publisher.

== Performance history ==
=== 19th century ===
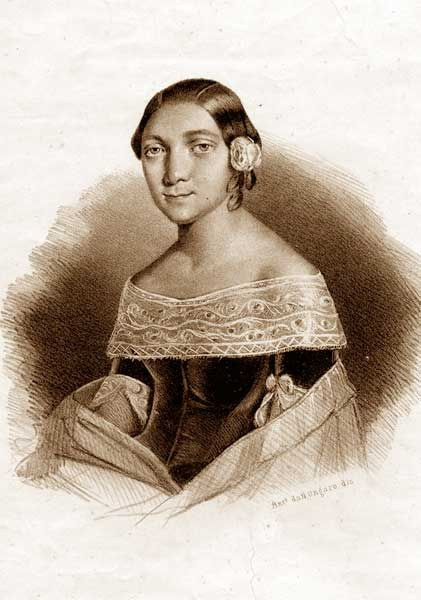
Marianna Barbieri-Nini

Lucca decided on the Teatro Grande (now the Teatro Lirico Giuseppe Verdi) in Trieste as the location for the Spring 1848 premiere, but political events in Lombardy postponed it until the autumn. The opera house management felt that Muzio would be capable to handling the staging, but having fled to Switzerland, he became unavailable and the task was handled by Luigi Ricci who, along with his brother Federico, were minor composers of the day. Verdi did not attend the first performance. However, Verdi's biographer Mary Jane Phillips-Matz feels that Lucca chose a good house and a cast "almost as good as anyone could have mustered in Europe at the time." In addition, she quotes from a long letter which Verdi wrote to the soprano Marianna Barbieri-Nini, who had been his Lady Macbeth at the 1847 premiere of that opera. In the letter, Verdi said that he wanted "to tell you a few things about your pieces", and gives her some very explicit advice on how to sing Gulnara.

As it turned out, the opera was poorly received by both the press and the public in Trieste, an unusual occurrence for Verdi. Budden notes that it "vanished from the repertoire after three performances" and that the local feeling would have been that "Trieste deserves a better opera than this".

Relatively few performances were given in Italy after the premiere, although it was staged in Milan and Turin in 1852, and in Modena, Novara, Venice, and Vercelli in 1853.

=== 20th century and beyond ===
The opera was given its first performances in Britain (London) in March 1966 and in the US in December 1981.

It was presented as part of a Verdi Festival by the San Diego Opera in 1982 with Rosalind Plowright and June Anderson, and in 2004 by the Sarasota Opera as part of its "Verdi Cycle". The Teatro Regio di Parma presented it in 2008 as part of their "Festival Verdi", while another company which aims to present all of the composer's operas, the ABAO in Bilbao, Spain, gave it in November 2010.

In concert versions, it was given by the Liceu Barcelona and the Royal Opera, London in June 1996, Corrado having been sung by José Cura. The Opera Orchestra of New York presented it in March 2004. The Washington Concert Opera in Washington, D.C. presented a concert version in March 2014 with a cast including Michael Fabiano as Corrado, Tamara Wilson as Gulnara, and Nicole Cabell as Medora. Fabiano starred in a new production of the opera in April 2018 at the Palau de Les Arts, Valencia.

== Roles ==
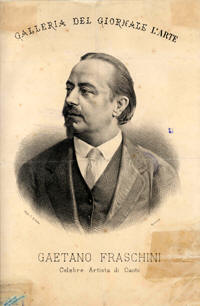
Portrait of Gaetano Fraschini

Role	Voice type	Premiere Cast, 25 October 1848 (Conductor: Luigi Ricci)
Corrado, captain of the Pirates	tenor	Gaetano Fraschini
Medora, Corrado's young lover	soprano	Carolina Rapazzini
Pasha Seid, Pasha of Coron	baritone	Achille De Bassini
Gulnara, Seid's favorite slave	soprano	Marianna Barbieri-Nini
Giovanni, a pirate	bass	Giovanni Volpini
Aga Selimo, Official of the Pasha	tenor	Giovanni Petrovich
A Black Eunuch	tenor	Francesco Cucchiari
Slave	tenor	Stefano Albanassich

== Synopsis ==
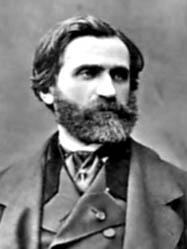
Verdi about 1850

Place: A Greek island in the Aegean and the Turkish city of Corone.
Time: The early 1800s

=== Act 1 ===
The Greek Island

Scene 1: Corrado's ship

The island is controlled by the corsairs, or pirates. A chorus introduces Corrado, the chief corsair, who is in exile. He laments his present condition: Tutto parea sorridere / "The world seemed to smile upon my early life". But he receives a letter containing military intelligence about the Turkish Pasha, Seid. It convinces him to set sail with his comrades, and he immediately starts rallying the troops: Sì, di Corsari il fulmine / "Yes, the lightning blow of the Corsairs shall I myself strike".

Scene 2: Medora's home

Medora is alone, and anxious for Corrado's return. She picks up her harp and sings a beautiful, but vaguely sinister aria; some sixth sense seems to be telling her that things are bound to turn out badly: Non so le tetre immagini / "Dark forebodings I cannot banish from my thoughts". When Corrado finally arrives, the two sing a duet that captures both the serenity of their love and the uncertainty of their future. Medora pleads with Corrado not to leave, but finally he departs to confront the Pasha.

=== Act 2 ===
Corone

Scene 1: The harem

The slave girls in Pasha Seid's harem are looking after Gulnara, the Pasha's favorite. However, Gulnara is unhappy about the Pasha's attentions. She chafes at life in the harem, and longs for freedom and true love: Vola talor dal carcere / "At times my thought flies free from its prison". A eunuch brings Gulnara an invitation to a celebratory banquet anticipating the Pasha's victory in the impending sea battle with the corsairs. She expresses a hope of something better awaiting her in life: Ah conforto è sol la speme / "Ah, comfort lies only in hope for this lost soul" and the ladies of the harem tell her that "you are everyone's hope".

Scene 2: The banquet

Seid and his men express their feelings that Allah will protect them: Salve, Allah! tutta quanta / "Hail Allah! All the earth resounds with his mighty name". A slave asks the Pasha if a Dervish who has apparently escaped from the corsairs might be admitted. Seid grants an audience and questions him. Suddenly everyone notices flames at sea: the Pasha's fleet is burning. As the Dervish whips off his disguise and reveals himself to be Corrado, his corsairs invade the banquet, and a battle takes place. At first, it seems that Corrado and his men will win, but he makes a fatal mistake. Seeing that the harem is burning, Corrado decides to rescue Gulnara and the other women. This gives the Pasha and his men time to regroup. They take Corrado prisoner and Seid confronts him – Audace cotanto, mostrarti pur sai? / "Yet so bold do you stand before me" – as he condemns Corrado to a grisly death, in spite of pleas from Gulnara and the harem to spare him for saving their lives.

=== Act 3 ===
Scene 1: Seid's quarters

Seid is enjoying his victory, but he is not entirely satisfied: Cento leggiadre vergini / "A hundred lissom virgins asked love of me" he says, but "my heart beats only for Gulnara". He is afraid she has fallen for the dashing Corrado. Sending for her, he proclaims his basic credo of revenge: S'avvicina il tuo momento / "Your moment approaches, dread thirst for vengeance". When she enters, he challenges her and she tells him that he is right; he threatens Gulnara, but she defies him and the Pasha storms out of the room.

Scene 2: The prison

Corrado is in prison and assumes that he is doomed: Eccomi prigionero! / "Here am I a prisoner". Having bribed a guard to let her into his cell, Gulnara vows to help him, handing him a knife to kill Seid. Corrado rejects her offer, citing his honor as a combatant. He also senses her deep feelings for him, and tells her that he is in love with Medora. Gulnara leaves, saying that she will kill Seid. In a brief interlude, the stormy music, which opened the Prelude, is heard again; this time, it accompanies a murder. On her return Gulnara reports that she takes all the blame for killing the Pasha: Sul capo mio discenda, fiero Iddio / "Upon my head, grim God, let your dread lightning fall". With their enemy gone, she and Corrado resolve to escape together to the corsairs' island.

Scene 3: The Greek island

Near death after taking poison, Medora is convinced that she will never see Corrado again. The ship carrying Gulnara and Corrado appears in the distance and, when they arrive, Corrado and Medora throw themselves into each other's arms. In a trio with each character expressing his/her feelings, Corrado begins by explaining how he and Gulnara became free: Per me infelice vedi costei / "Unhappy for my sake you see this woman; she risked her life to save mine". However, their joy does not last for long, for Medora dies. With his men trying to stop him, Corrado leaps from a cliff to his death as the opera ends.

== Orchestration ==
Il corsaro is scored for piccolo, flute, two oboes, two clarinets, two bassoons, four horns, two trumpets, three trombones, cimbasso, triangle, cymbals, timpani, bass drum and cymbals, cannon, harp, strings.

== Music ==
When discussing the qualities of Byron's poetry in comparison with how Verdi treated it musically, Julian Budden points to one obvious problem: the opera "hardly makes for music-drama [because] it is a narrative. Not being conceived of in dramatic terms it offers no opportunity for the generation of musical power through conflict and clash of personalities." He compares it unfavourably with "the steady crescendo of dramatic interest" in Ernani, or the "cut and thrust of character dialectic that informs I due Foscari and "without the sense of grand theatre that transfigures the great moments in Giovanna d'Arco and Attila. David Kimball (in Holden) also describes it in comparable terms, emphasizing that "after the weightiness of the three previous three operas [... it] seems a light, sketchy piece." But he does note that Verdi was "designing arias more imaginatively". Of interest is the caution given by Roger Parker for us to be aware that the dramatic structure of the opera was finalized in 1846, before Macbeth, and therefore this might be a reason for regarding the opera as old-fashioned.

== Recordings ==
Year	Cast (Corrado, Medora, Gulnara, Seid)	Conductor, Opera House and Orchestra	Label
1971	Giorgio Casellato Lamberti, Katia Ricciarelli, Ángeles Gulín, Renato Bruson	Jesús López-Cobos, Frankfurt Opera Orchestra and Chorus (Live recording)	Audio CD: Gala Records; Cat: 100.707
1975	José Carreras, Jessye Norman, Montserrat Caballé, Gian Piero Mastromei	Lamberto Gardelli, New Philharmonia Orchestra and the Ambrosian Singers	Audio CD: Philips; Cat: 475 6769
2004	Zvetan Michailov, Michela Sburlati, Adriana Damato, Renato Bruson	Renato Palumbo, Teatro Regio di Parma Orchestra and Chorus (Live recording of June performance)	Audio CD: Dynamic; Cat: CD 468/1-2; DVD: Dynamic; Cat: 33468
2008	Bruno Ribeiro, Irina Lungu, Silvia Dalla Benetta, Luca Salsi	Carlo Montanaro, Orchestra and chorus of Teatro Regio di Parma, (Recorded live at the Teatro Regio di Parma, Parma, 19 and 21 October)	DVD & Blu-ray: C Major Entertainment, Cat: 722408
