= Tagliavini =

Tagliavini is an Italian surname. Notable people with the surname include:

- Ferruccio Tagliavini (1913–1995), Italian opera singer
- Gabriela Tagliavini (born 1968), Argentine film director
- Heidi Tagliavini (born 1950), Swiss diplomat
- Luigi Ferdinando Tagliavini (1929–2017), Italian organist, harpsichordist, musicologist and composer
- Roberto Tagliavini (born 1976), Italian operatic bass
- Solange Tagliavini (born 1985), Argentine handball player
- Vasco Tagliavini (1937–2019), Italian footballer
