= Lella Ricci =

Italian opera singer

- Born: Adelaide Ricci; 1850; Trieste, Austrian Empire
- Died: 7 October 1871 (aged 21); Prague, Bohemia, Austria-Hungary
- Cause of death: internal bleeding during abortion
- Burial place: Olšany Cemetery, Prague
- Occupation: opera singer
- Known for: sing in the comic opera Crispino e la comare composed by her father
- Parents: Luigi Ricci (father); Ludmila Stolz (mother)
- Relatives: Teresa Stolz (aunt)

Lella Ricci (1850 – 7 October 1871) was an opera singer from the Austrian Empire.

== Life ==
She was born in 1850 in Trieste, Austrian Empire as Adelaide Ricci to composer Luigi Ricci and opera singer Ludmila Stolz (1826–1910; the sister of Teresa Stolz). She inherited musical talent and enjoyed a great success in the Theatre Principe Umberto in Florence. Emilio Usiglio composed the opera La scommessa for her (the first performance was on 6 July 1870 in Florence). At age 21, Lella Ricci was invited by Bedřich Smetana to Prague to sing in the comic opera Crispino e la comare composed by her father. When in Prague, she became pregnant (possibly by Smetana), but to keep her career she chose abortion and died due to internal bleeding. She was interred at the Olšany Cemetery in Prague.
