= Mormile =

Mormile is a surname. Notable people with the surname include:

- Gaetano Mormile (1839–1890), Italian painter
- Nardo Mormile (died 1493), Roman Catholic prelate
- Salvatore Mormile (1839–?), Italian painter
