= Teresa Stolz =

Czech classical singer (1834–1902)

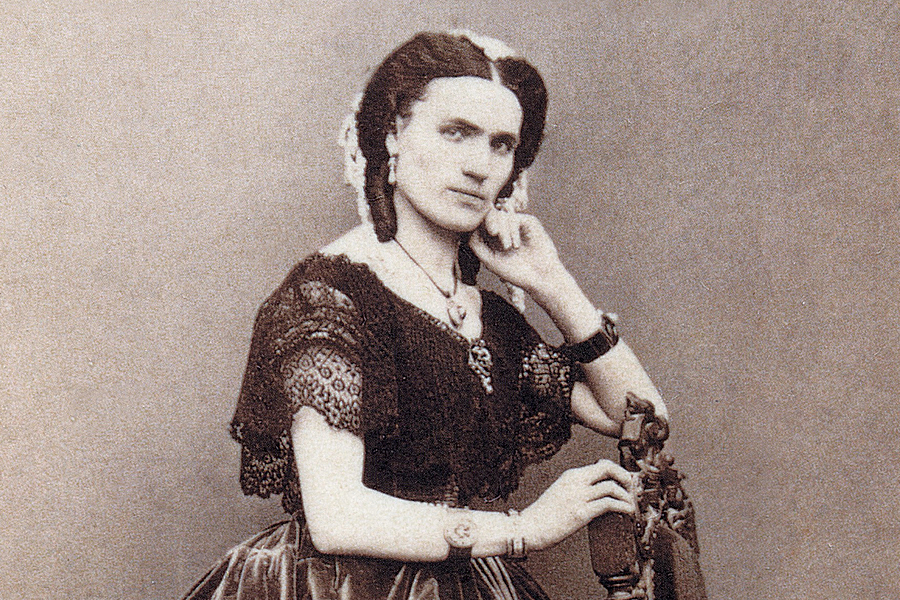
- Stolz in the 1890s
- Born: Tereza Stolzová; 2 June 1834; Kostelec nad Labem, Bohemia, Austrian Empire
- Died: 23 August 1902 (aged 68); Milan, Italy
- Education: Prague Conservatory
- Occupation: Spinto soprano
- Organizations: La Scala, Milan

Teresa Stolz (born Tereza Stolzová; (Note: Her given name has also been rendered in diminutive versions such as Teresina, Teresie or Terezie) 2 June 1834 – 23 August 1902) was a Czech spinto soprano. For long she was a resident in Italy and was associated with significant performances of the works of Giuseppe Verdi, some with his supervision including Aida in the first performance in Italy, and the soprano part in his Requiem. She was his companion from 1897.

Stolz has been described as "the Verdian dramatic soprano par excellence, powerful, passionate in utterance, but dignified in manner and secure in tone and control".

== Life and career ==
Tereza Stolzová was born in Kostelec nad Labem in Bohemia, Austrian Empire (now in the Czech Republic) on 2 June 1834, or 5 June. She grew up in a musical family, with eight siblings. She studied voice with Josef Neruda (1804–1876), a cellist in her hometown, and further at the Prague Conservatory with Giovanni Battista Gardigiani from 1849. She was expelled from the Conservatoire in October 1851 but continued her studies with Vojtěch Čaboun. She moved to Trieste to be with her brother; she studied there from 1856 with Luigi Ricci, who had conducted the 1848 premiere of Verdi's Il corsaro, and would become her brother-in-law.

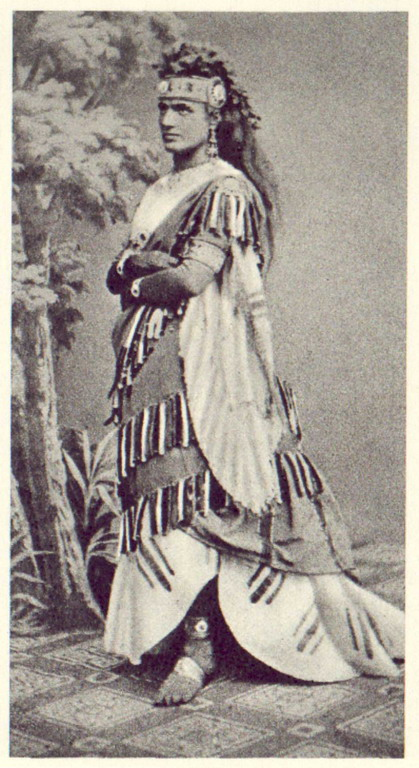
Teresa Stolz as the title role of Aida, Parma, 1872

She made her operatic debut in Tbilisi in 1857, and also appeared in Odessa and Constantinople. She went to Italy, where she was a pupil of Francesco Lamperti in Milan. She probably appeared in Italy first in Turin in 1863, followed by Nice where she performed as Leonora in Verdi's Il trovatore. The following year she appeared as Elvira in Verdi's Ernani in Granada in 1864, and as Leonora in Spoleto.

She first appeared at La Scala in Milan in 1865, in the title role of Verdi's Giovanna d'Arco. She performed as Elisabetta in the first performance in Italy of Don Carlo in Bologna in 1867, and as Leonora in the revised version of La forza del destino in Milan on 27 February 1869.

Stolz was the first to sing the title role of Aida in Italy at La Scala on 8 February 1872 which was also the European premiere. Verdi had not attended the world premiere in Cairo the previous December, and considered the Milan performance, in which he was heavily involved at every stage, to be its real premiere. She remained a leading singer at the house until 1875.

Stolz was also the soprano soloist at the premiere of Verdi's Requiem on 22 May 1874. She also appeared in the Requiem with Verdi conducting at the Royal Albert Hall in London in 1875. She reprised Aida with Verdi in Vienna in 1875 and in Paris in 1876. Other roles included the title roles in Donizetti's Lucrezia Borgia and Bellini's Norma, Mathilde in Rossini's Guillaume Tell, Alice in Meyerbeer's Robert le diable, and Verdi roles Amelia in Un ballo in maschera, Gilda in Rigoletto and Desdemona in Otello. Her career took her to places such as Moscow, Saint Petersburg, Cairo, the major Italian opera houses, as well as Vienna, Paris and London.

== Personal life ==
Stolz was the mistress and later the fiancée of the conductor and composer Angelo Mariani.

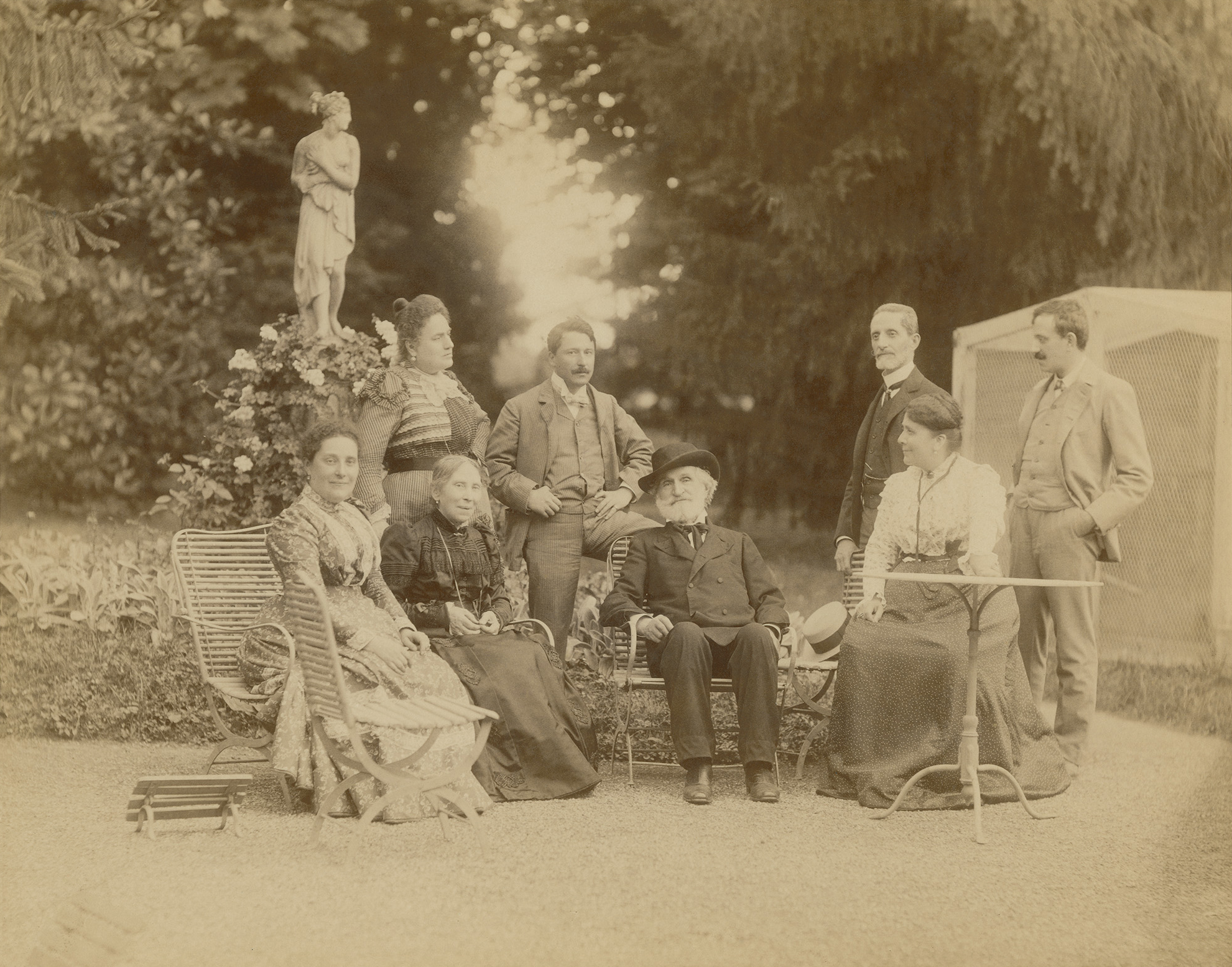
1900 group portrait at Verdi's Sant'Agata house; Verdi in the middle, Teresa Stolz standing to the left, Verdi's adopted daughter seated at left, and his sister-in-law seated on the right

Stolz broke with Mariani in 1871. She became Verdi's companion after the death of his wife, Giuseppina Strepponi, in 1897.

Stolz died in Milan in 1902, the year after Verdi's death, and is buried there. A hall in Kostelec is named after her.

== Family ==
Stolz had elder twin sisters, Francesca (Fanny) and Ludmila (Lidia), who both became sopranos. They both lived openly in Trieste with her teacher, the conductor and composer Luigi Ricci, who married Ludmila, but maintained the relationship with Francesca. By Ludmila, Ricci had a daughter Adelaide (Lella) Ricci, who was also a singer. By Francesca, Luigi Ricci had a son, also Luigi Ricci, Teresa's nephew, who was a conductor and composer. He inherited her estate, and changed his name to Luigi Ricci-Stolz.
