= Luigi Ricci-Stolz =

Italian musician and composer

Luigi Ricci-Stolz (1852 – 10 February 1906) was an Italian musician and composer.

He was born as Giacomo Ricci in Trieste, Austrian Empire, to composer Luigi Ricci and opera singer Francesca Stolz (1826–1900?), the elder sister of the famous Verdian diva Teresa Stolz. At the time Luigi Ricci was married to Ludmila Stolz (1826–1910), the identical twin sister of Francesca. Ricci-Stolz's uncle, Federico Ricci, was also a composer.

He inherited the estate of his aunt Teresa Stolz, and changed his name to Ricci-Stolz.

Ricci-Stolz was a conductor and composer. In addition to church music, songs and a string quartet, he also published a number of operas.

He died in Milan in 1906, aged 54.

== Operas ==
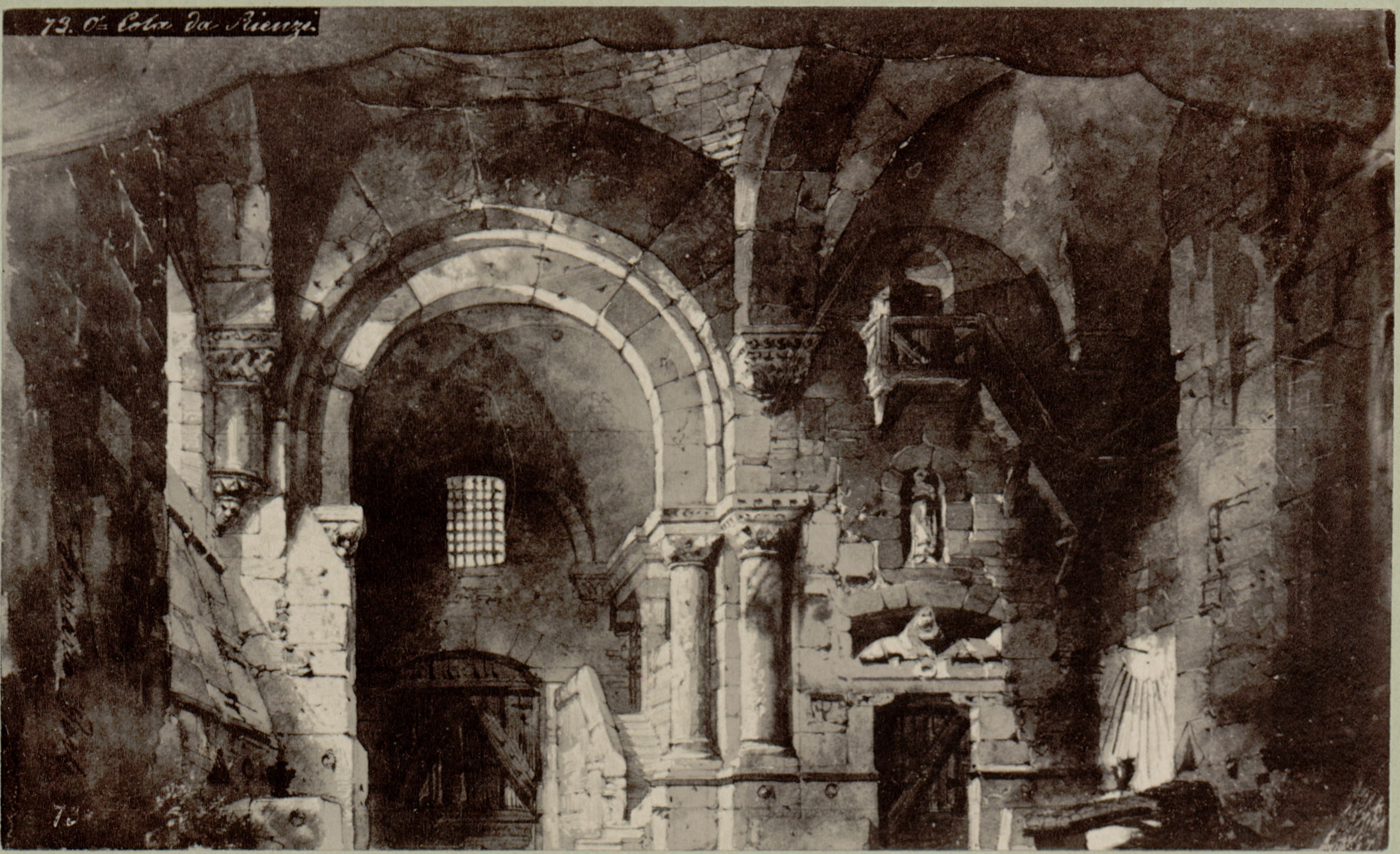
Sotterraneo di S. Sebastiano, set design for Cola di Rienzo act 1 scene 3 (undated).

- Frosina – Genoa, 1870
- Cola di Rienzo – Venice, 1880
- Un curioso accidente – Venice, 1880
- Donna Ines – Piacenza, 1885
- La coda del diavolo – Turin, 1885
- Don Chisciotte (after Miguel de Cervantes's Don Quixote) – Venice, 1887
- Il frutto proibito – Barcelona, 1888
- Roma intangibile
