= Kostelec nad Labem =

- Town
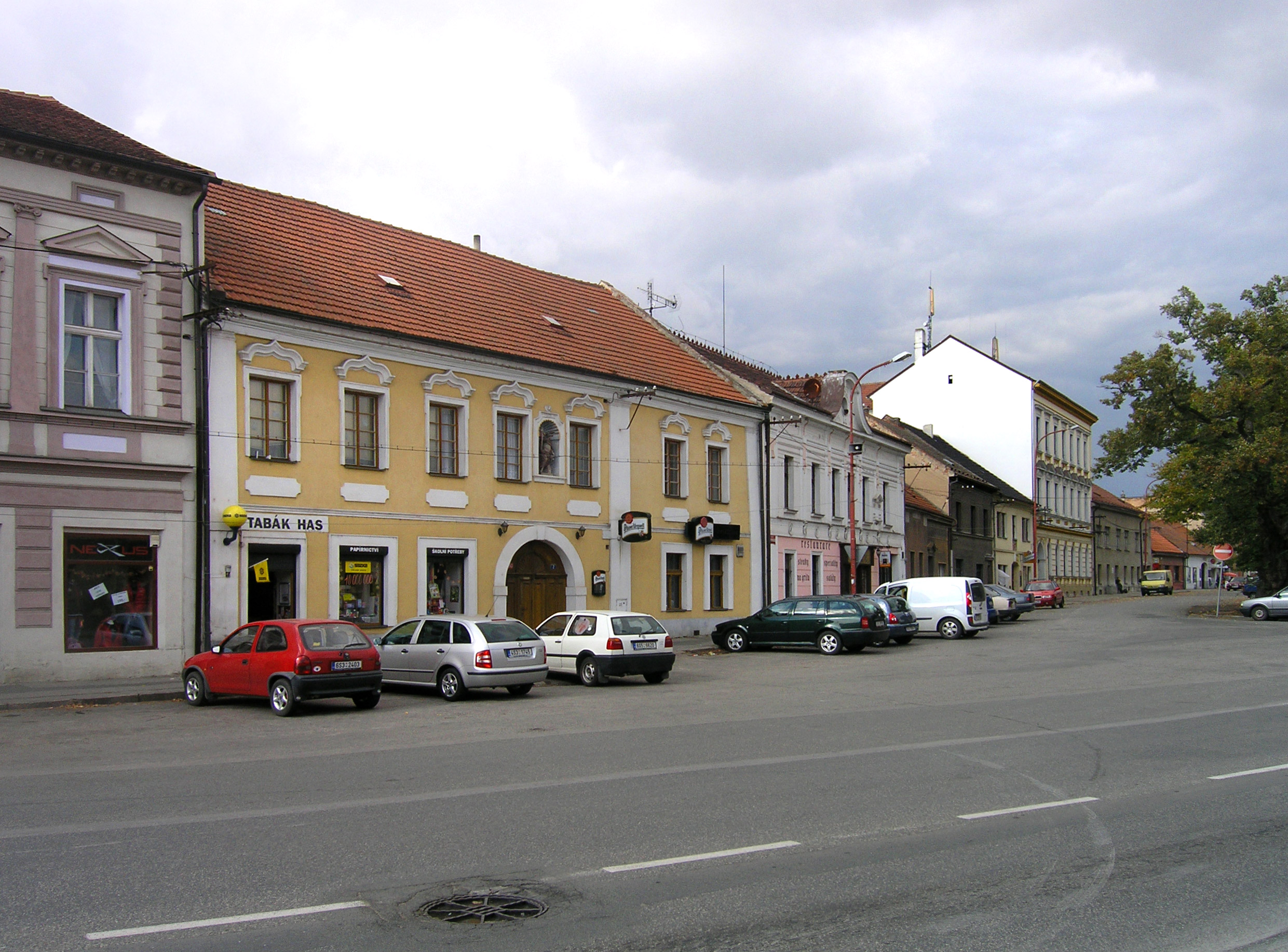
- The square Komenského náměstí, centre of the town

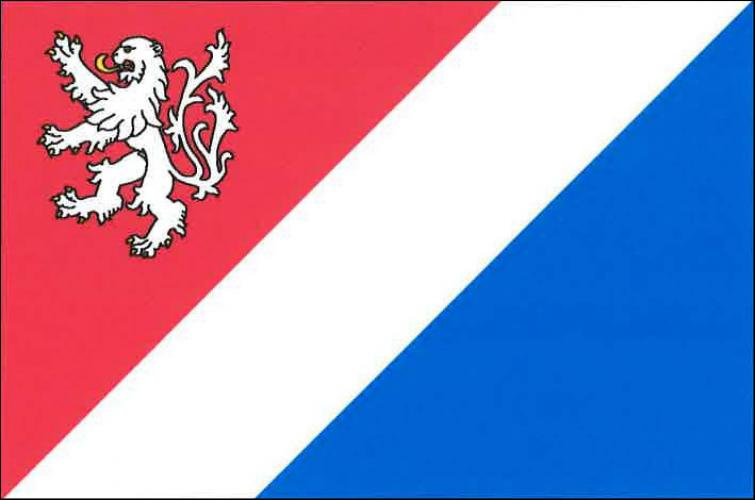
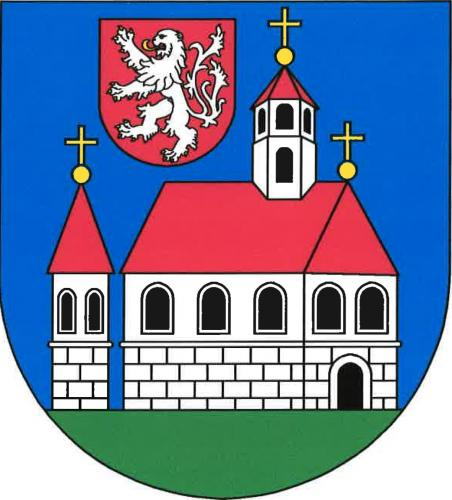
- Flag Coat of arms

- Location in the Czech Republic
- Coordinates: 50°13′36″N 14°35′11″E
- Country: Czech Republic
- Region: Central Bohemian
- District: Mělník
- First mentioned: 1270

Government
  - Mayor: Josef Chalupa

Area
  - Total: 15.55 km^{2} (6.00 sq mi)
- Elevation: 172 m (564 ft)

Population (2026-01-01)
  - Total: 4,459
  - Density: 286.8/km^{2} (742.7/sq mi)
- Time zone: UTC+1 (CET)
  - Summer (DST): UTC+2 (CEST)
- Postal code: 277 13
- Website: www.kostelecnadlabem.cz

Kostelec nad Labem (Czech pronunciation: [ˈkostɛlɛts ˈnad labɛm]; German: Elbekosteletz) is a town in Mělník District in the Central Bohemian Region of the Czech Republic. It has about 4,500 inhabitants. The town is located on the Elbe River in the Central Elbe Table.

Kostelec nad Labem was founded in the 13th century and was a dowry town of Bohemian queens. The historic town centre is well preserved and is protected as an urban monument zone.

== Administrative division ==
Kostelec nad Labem consists of two municipal parts (in brackets population according to the 2021 census):

- Kostelec nad Labem (3,714)
- Jiřice (538)

== Etymology ==
Kostelec is a common Czech toponym. The Czech word kostelec is a diminutive of kostel (i.e. 'church'; derived from the Latin word castellum). It usually referred to a brick (fortified) church.

== Geography ==
Kostelec nad Labem is located about 15 kilometres (9 mi) south of Mělník and 14 km (9 mi) north of Prague. It lies in a flat landscape in the Central Elbe Table. The town is situated on the left bank of the Elbe River.

== History ==
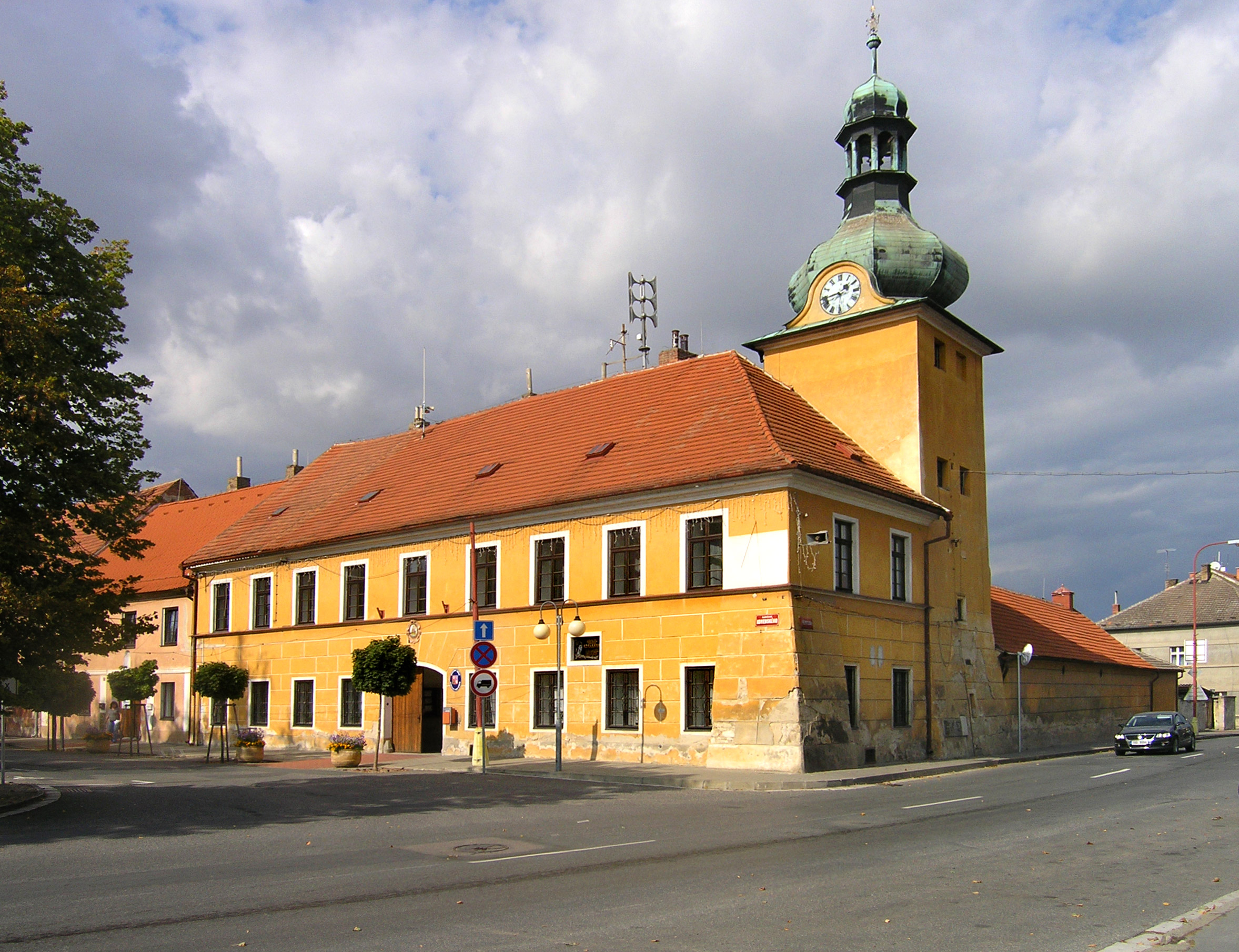
Town hall

Kostelec was probably founded by King Ottokar II in the second half of the 13th century. The first known owners of Kostelec were the Borš family from Osek, when the settlement was taken over by Ottokar II in 1270.

The market town later belonged to Queen Elizabeth of Bohemia and became the dowry town of Bohemian queens. The queen granted privileges to the town and the mill, and relieved the town of some duties. There were many ponds around Kostelec. To the northwest stood a water fortress, which was well fortified and served as the residence of Bohemian queens. Charles IV pawned Kostelec to his wife Elizabeth of Pomerania. She gave the town other privileges, which Charles IV confirmed. Around 1364, the town was hit by a great fire, which destroyed many houses.Kostelec subsequently lost its town privileges.

In the 15th century, Kostelec was owned by the Berka of Dubá family, from whom Queen Joanna of Rožmitál, the widow of King George of Poděbrady, purchased it. Under the rule of King Vladislaus II, in 1486, Kostelec was promoted to a town.

The Jewish community was established in Kostelec around 1505. It came to an end in 1940. Jews were mostly buyers, they bought houses in the town, the municipal council also reserved a cemetery for them. They introduced a school for children around 1717. In 1886, the granary was rebuilt into a synagogue, which was demolished after 1948.

== Demographics ==
Historical population

| Year | Pop. | ±% |
|---|---|---|
| 1869 | 2,078 | — |
| 1880 | 2,709 | +30.4% |
| 1890 | 2,917 | +7.7% |
| 1900 | 3,119 | +6.9% |
| 1910 | 3,398 | +8.9% |

| Year | Pop. | ±% |
|---|---|---|
| 1921 | 3,549 | +4.4% |
| 1930 | 3,575 | +0.7% |
| 1950 | 3,460 | −3.2% |
| 1961 | 3,543 | +2.4% |
| 1970 | 3,409 | −3.8% |

| Year | Pop. | ±% |
|---|---|---|
| 1980 | 3,127 | −8.3% |
| 1991 | 2,888 | −7.6% |
| 2001 | 2,938 | +1.7% |
| 2011 | 3,616 | +23.1% |
| 2021 | 4,252 | +17.6% |

Source: Censuses

== Transport ==
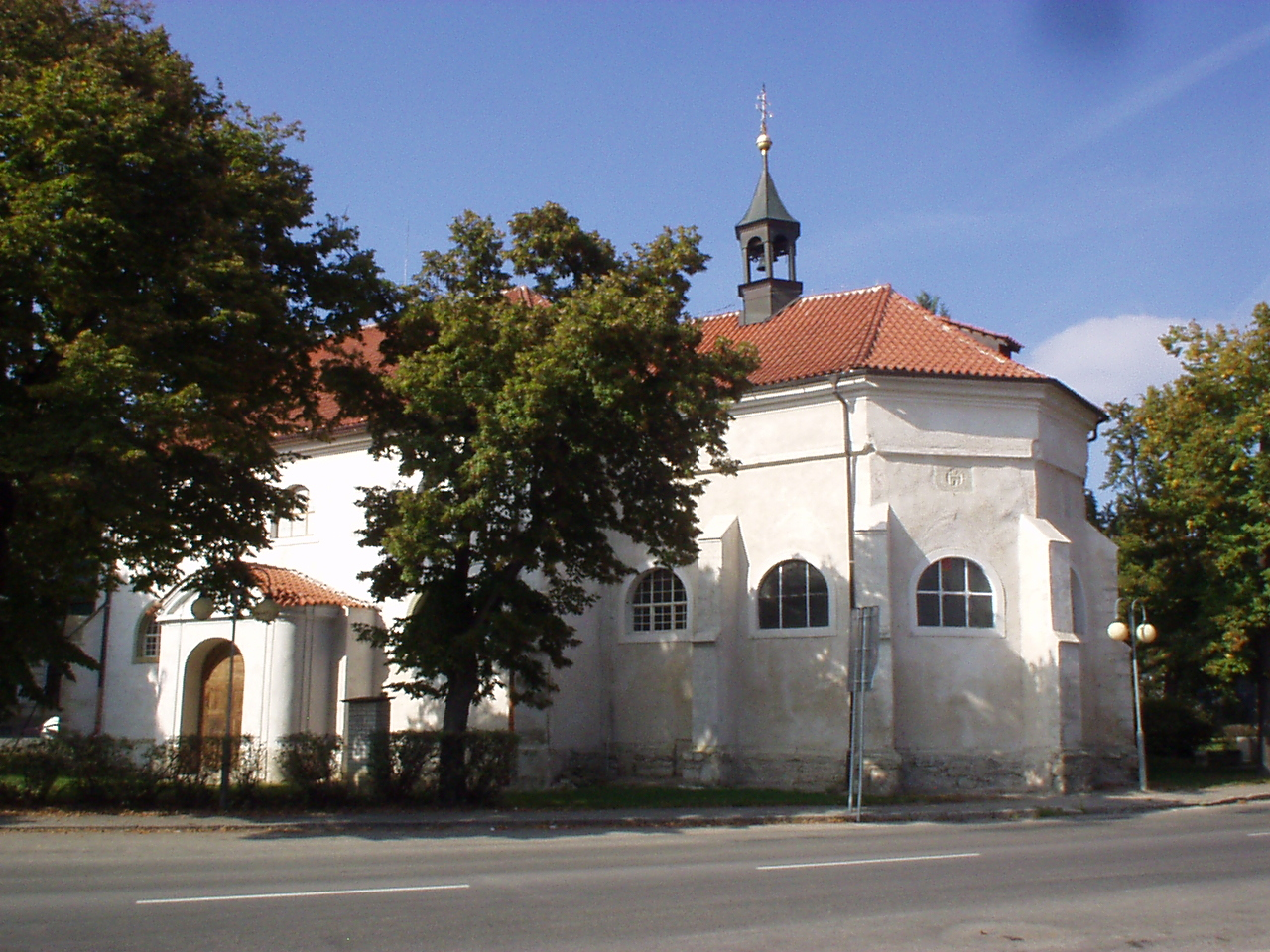
Church of Saint Vitus

Kostelec nad Labem is located on the railway line Neratovice–Čelákovice.

== Sights ==
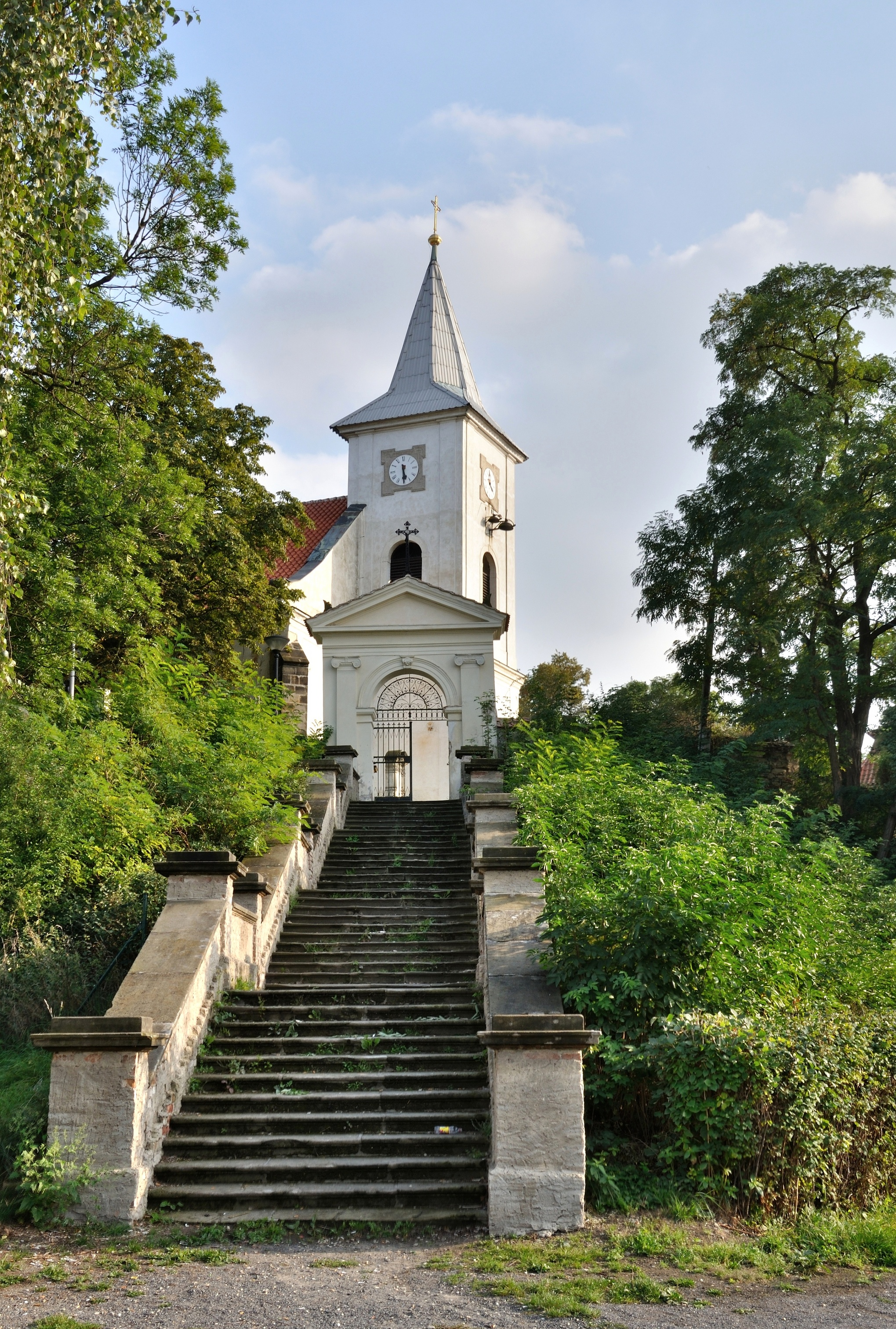
Church of Saint Martin

The originally a Gothic town hall was rebuilt in the Renaissance style after a fire in 1551, and heavily modified in 1727 and 1820. It is a foot corner building with a prismatic tower, divided by rectangular windows with a pillar in the corner.

The Church of Saint Vitus is a late Gothic building with a presbytery built before 1492, and three-nave from the beginning of the 16th century. In 1566–1567, the church was rebuilt in the Renaissance style. Then it was modified in the 17th century and in 1728. The south vestibule is from the middle of the 18th century, and the bell tower was modified in 1829.

The Church of Saint Martin is a cemetery church, originally a parish church built in 1361 at the latest. It was rebuilt in the late Gothic style, and its chapel was renovated in the 17th century. In 1769, it was extended by the western tower and a choir was built.

The old Jewish cemetery was founded in 1594 and is one of the oldest in Bohemia. Only newer tombstones from the second half of the 19th century are preserved. It has around 300 tombstones.

The fortress in Kostelec nad Labem was first mentioned in 1359. In 1864, it was turned into a private residence, and it is still used for this purpose today.

== Notable people ==
- Teresa Stolz (1834–1902), operatic soprano
