= Giacomo Roppa =

Italian opera singer

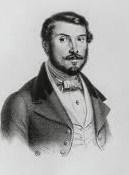
- Giacomo Roppa

Background information
- Occupation: Italian operatic tenor
- Years active: 1830s-1850s

Giacomo Roppa was an Italian operatic tenor who was active career in Italy's most important opera houses from the 1830s through the 1850s. He also made appearances at the Liceu in Spain. He is best remembered for creating the role of Jacopo Foscari in the world premiere of Giuseppe Verdi's I due Foscari in 1844.

== Career ==
In 1832 Roppa portrayed the role of Guelfo in the world premiere of Giuseppe Fournier-Gorre's Francesca da Rimini at the Regio Teatro degli Avvalorati di Livorno. He also appeared at that theatre that year as Osburgo in Vincenzo Bellini's La straniera. In 1834 he made his debut at La Fenice in Venice as Albino in Gaetano Donizetti's Fausta. He was also heard at that house as Aladino in the world premiere of Saverio Mercadante's Emma d'Antiochia on 8 March 1834. In the Fall of 1834 he appeared at the Teatro Comunale di Bologna as Albino, Flavio in Bellini's Norma, Geroldo in Francesco Morlacchi's Tebaldo e Isolina, and Hervey in Gaetano Donizetti's Anna Bolena.

In 1835 Roppa appeared at the Teatro Regio di Torino as Guido in Pietro Antonio Coppola's Gli Illinesi. He was committed there through 1837, singing such roles as Alamiro in Donizetti's Belisario, Don Pedro in Giuseppe Persiani's Inês de Castro, Edgardo in Donizaetti's Lucia di Lammermoor, and Lorenzo in Bellini's I Capuleti e i Montecchi He made his debut at La Scala in 1838 as Alphonse in Daniel Auber's La muette de Portici, remaining there through 1839. In 1841 he appeared at the opera house in Livorno as Gennaro in Donizetti's Lucrezia Borgia. He returned to Bologna in 1842 where he sang Faone in Giovanni Pacini's Saffo and Olnezero in Pietro Torrigiani's La sibilla. In 1843 he returned to Livorno to portray Icilio in Alessandro Nini's Virginia and Vivaldi in Fabio Campana's Vannina d'Ornano.

In 1844 Roppa created the role of Jacopo Foscari in the world premiere of Giuseppe Verdi's I due Foscari at the Teatro Argentina in Rome. He was committed to La Fenice again in 1844-1845 where he was heard as Pollione in Bellini's Norma and the title role Giacomo Meyerbeer's Robert le diable. From 1846-1848 he was committed to the Teatro Regio di Parma where he had a particular triumph as Curiazo in Mercadante's Orazi e Curiazi and was admired as Jacopo Foscari. From 1848-1851 he was committed to the Liceu in Barcelona where he was heard in more than 30 opera roles, including Gennaro, Jacopo Foscari, Tamas in Gemma di Vergy, and the title role in Dom Sébastien. Some of his last appearances were at the Teatro Comunale di Bologna in 1856 as Carlo in Verdi's I masnadieri, Matteo Borsa in Verdi's Rigoletto, and Rodolfo in Luisa Miller.
