= Marianna Barbieri-Nini =

Italian operatic soprano

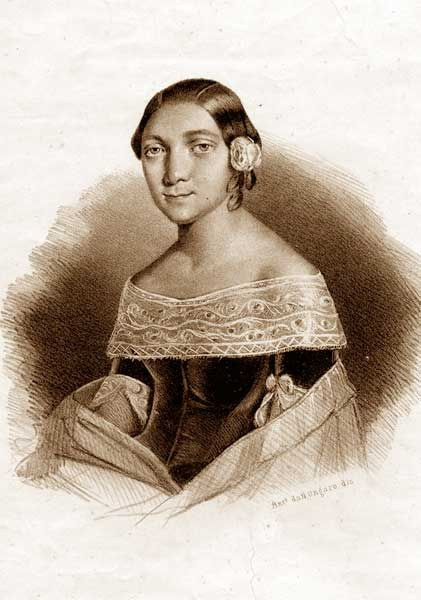
Marianna Barbieri-Nini

Marianna Barbieri-Nini (18 February 1818 in Florence – 27 November 1887 in Florence) was an Italian operatic soprano who had an active career in Italy's major opera houses from 1840 through 1856.

She also made appearances at the Liceu in Barcelona, the Teatro Real in Madrid, Her Majesty's Theatre in London, and at theatres in Paris. She possessed a powerful voice with coloratura facility and was known for her highly dramatic singing and acting. She was especially admired in the title roles of Gaetano Donizetti's Anna Bolena and Gioachino Rossini's Semiramide. She was also successful in the operas of Giuseppe Verdi, notably creating roles in the world premieres of three of his works.

== Life and career ==
Born in Florence, Barbieri-Nini studied singing with Luigi Barbieri, Giuditta Pasta, and Nicola Vaccai.

In 1840 she made her professional opera debut at La Scala as Antonina in Donizetti's Belisario; a performance which was negatively received. She had her first success the following year in the title role of Donizetti's Lucrezia Borgia at the Teatro della Pergola in Florence.

For the next 15 years she sang with great success throughout Italy and in Spain and France. She created roles in the world premieres of several operas by Giuseppe Verdi, including Lucrezia Contarini in I due Foscari (1844, Teatro Argentina), Lady Macbeth in Macbeth (1847, Teatro della Pergola), and Gulnara in Il corsaro (1848, Teatro Lirico Giuseppe Verdi).

After retiring from the stage in 1856, Barbieri-Nini worked as a singing teacher in Florence. Her first marriage was to Count Nini of Siena, and after his death she married the Viennese pianist Leopold Hackensöllner. She died in Florence in 1887 at the age of 69.
