= Rita Gabussi =

Italian opera singer

Rita Gabussi (c.1815 in Bologna – 26 January 1891 in Naples) was an Italian soprano. Gabussi was born in Bologna and studied under Bertinotti in Milan. She sang in 1842 the main role of Nina pazza per amore by Pietro Antonio Coppola, performed at the Teatro del Re, Milan. Rita was married to the baritone opera singer Achille De Bassini (1819–1881), and retired to care for her family in Naples. Their son, Alberto De Bassini, was also an opera singer, first as a tenor, and later as a baritone. Achille died, aged 62, at Cava de' Tirreni.

== Sources ==
- Dizionario biografico dei più celebri poeti ed artisti melodrammatici, tragici e comici, maestri, concertisti, coreografi, mimi, ballerini, scenografi, giornalisti, impresarii, ecc. che fiorirono in Italia dal 1800 al 1860, by Francesco Regli, Enrico Dalmazzo publisher, Turin (1860); page 216–217.
