= Luigi Ricci (composer) =

Italian composer

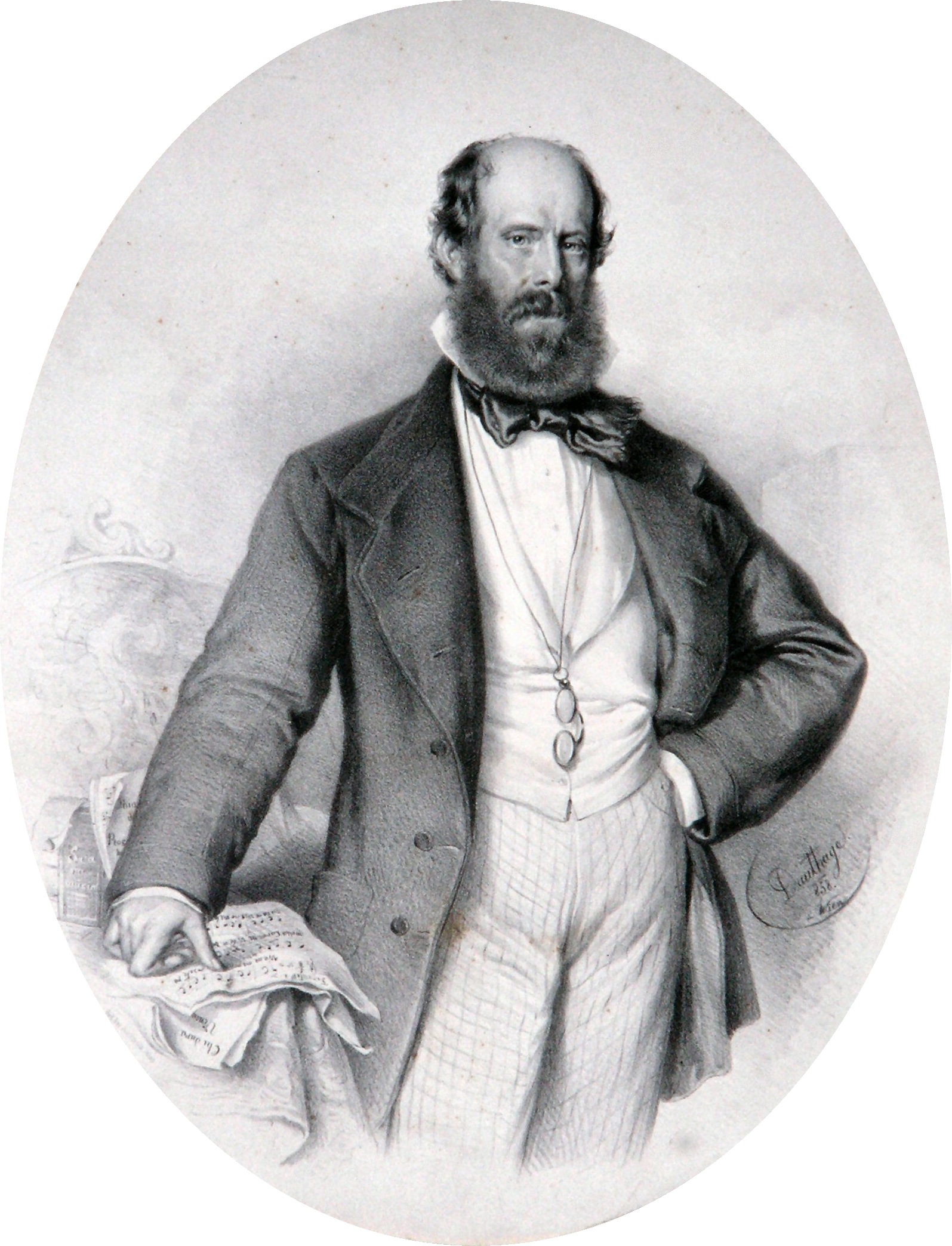
Luigi Ricci, lithography by Adolf Dauthage

Luigi Ricci (8 July 1805 – 31 December 1859) was an Italian composer, particularly of operas. He was the elder brother of Federico Ricci, with whom he collaborated on several works. He was also a conductor.

== Life ==
Ricci was born on 8 July 1805. He was born and educated in Naples, where he wrote his first opera at the conservatory in 1823. His triumphs in 1831 at La Scala with Chiara di Rosembergh and in 1834 with Un'avventura di Scaramuccia made him famous throughout Europe, and in 1835 he and his younger brother Federico collaborated in the first of the four operas they wrote together.

In 1837 Ricci ran into financial problems, brought about mainly by his extravagant life-style. He was forced to accept a job at Trieste, and he composed no operas for seven years.

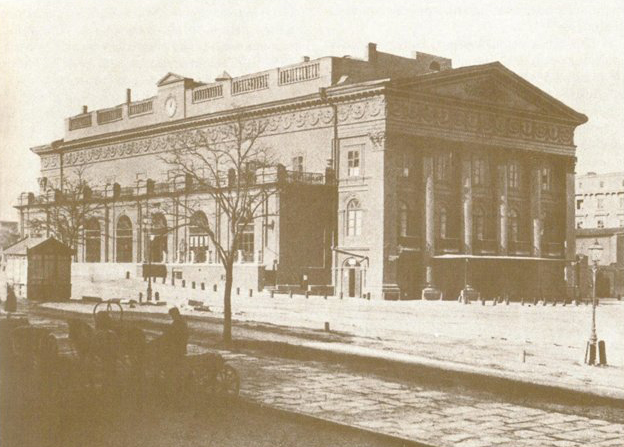
Operahouse at Odesa where he met the Stolz twins

Then, however, he fell in love, at the same time, with both Francesca and Ludmila, the 17-year-old identical twin sisters of the singer Teresa Stolz, also singers, and this inspired him to create (in 1845) an opera for them both to sing in, at Odesa. Back in Trieste he married Ludmila (without, however, letting go of the other).

He then composed three more operas on his own, which were well received, although his greatest success of these years was actually Crispino e la comare, his last collaboration with his brother, of which he wrote the greater part. Comedy was Ricci's strong suit, and though not quite reaching the level of Donizetti (whom he greatly admired), Crispino is generally considered one of the best Italian comic operas of the period. 'The Brewer of Preston', however, is treated irreverently by Andrea Camilleri in the novel of the same name.

His conducting credits include the world premiere of Verdi's Il corsaro.

Shortly after the production of his last opera in May 1859, Ricci succumbed to mental illness. He spent the last months of his life in a mental asylum in Prague. He died in Prague on 31 December 1859 and is buried in Prague's Olšany Cemetery

His daughter with Ludmila, Lella Ricci (1850–1871), was an opera singer, and his son with Francesca, Luigi Ricci-Stolz (1852–1906), was a composer, too.

== Ricci's operas and their librettists ==
- L'impresario in angustie (G. M. Diodati), farsa – Naples, Conservatorio, 1823
- La cena frastornata (Andrea Leone Tottola) – Naples, Teatro Nuovo, Autumn 1824
- L'abbate Taccarella, ovvero Aladino (also produced as La gabbia de' matti, Poeta Taccarella, etc.) (Andrea Leone Tottola) – Naples, Teatro Nuovo, carnival 1825
- Il sogno avverato (in collaboration with Dionigio Pogliani-Gagliardi and possibly N. Zingarelli) (Andrea Leone Tottola) – Naples, Teatro Nuovo, summer 1825
- Il diavolo condannato a prender moglie (also produced as Il diavolo mal sposato) (Andrea Leone Tottola) – Naples, Teatro Nuovo, 27 January 1827
- La lucerna di Epitteto (G. Checcherini) – Naples, Teatro Nuovo, carnival 1827
- Ulisse in Itaca (Domenico Gilardoni) – Naples, Teatro di San Carlo, 12 January 1828
- Colombo (Felice Romani) – Parma, Teatro ducale, 27 June 1829
- L'orfanella di Ginevra (Amina) (Jacopo Ferretti) – Rome, Teatro Valle, 9 September 1829
- Il sonnambulo (Jacopo Ferretti) – Rome, Teatro Valle, 26 December 1829
- Fernando Cortez, ovvero L'eroina del Messico (Jacopo Ferretti) – Rome, Teatro Tordinona, 9 February 1830
- Annibale in Torino (Felice Romani) – Turin, Teatro Regio, 26 December 1830
- La neve (Felice Romani) – Milan, Teatro Cannobiana, 21 June 1831
- Chiara di Rosemberg (Gaetano Rossi) – Milan, Teatro alla Scala, 11 October 1831, also produced as Chiara di Montalbano in France, 1835
- Il nuovo Figaro (Jacopo Ferretti) – Parma, Teatro ducale, 15 February 1832
- I due sergenti (Felice Romani) – Milan, Teatro alla Scala, 1 September 1833
- Un'avventura di Scaramuccia (Felice Romani) – Milan, Teatro alla Scala, 8 March 1834; then in Vienna (1835), London (1836), Madrid (1837), Lisbon (1838), Paris, Théâtre Italien (1846), Warsaw (1846; Polish), Brussels (1851), Buenos Aires (1851); also worked on by Friedrich von Flotow
- Gli esposti, ovvero Eran due or son tre (Jacopo Ferretti) – Turin, Teatro Angennes, 3 June 1834
- Chi dura vince ovvero La luna di miel (Jacopo Ferretti) – Rome, Teatro Valle, 26 December 1834; (revised by Federico Ricci as La petite comtesse, 1876)
- La serva e l'ussero (Magd und Husar), farsa – Pavia, Teatro Compadroni, New Year 1835
- Il colonello (also produced as La donna colonello) collaboration with Federico Ricci (Jacopo Ferretti) – Naples, Teatro del Fondo, 14 March 1835
- Chiara di Montalbano [in Francia] (Gaetano Rossi) – Milan, Teatro alla Scala, 15 August 1835
- Il disertore per amore collaboration with Federico Ricci (Jacopo Ferretti) – Naples, Teatro del fondo, 13 February 1836
- Le nozze di Figaro (Gaetano Rossi) – Milan, Teatro alla Scala, 13 February 1838; revised version (Milan, Teatro alla Scala, 1841)
- La solitaria delle Asturie (Felice Romani) – Odessa, Teatro Italiano, 20 February 1845
- L'amante di richiamo collaboration with Federico Ricci (F. Dall'Ongaro) – Turin, Teatro Angennes, 13 June 1846
- Il birraio di Preston (F. Guidi) – Florence, Teatro della Pergola, 4 February 1847
- Crispino e la comare collaboration with Federico Ricci (Francesco Maria Piave) – Venice, Teatro S. Benedetto, 28 February 1850
- La festa di Piedigrotta (M. D'Arienzo) – Naples, Teatro Nuovo, 23 June 1852. Concludes with the famous "tarantella napoletana".
- Il diavolo a quattro (Gaetano Rossi) – Triest, Teatro Armonia, 15 May 1859
