= Gaetano Mormile =

Italian painter (1839–1890)

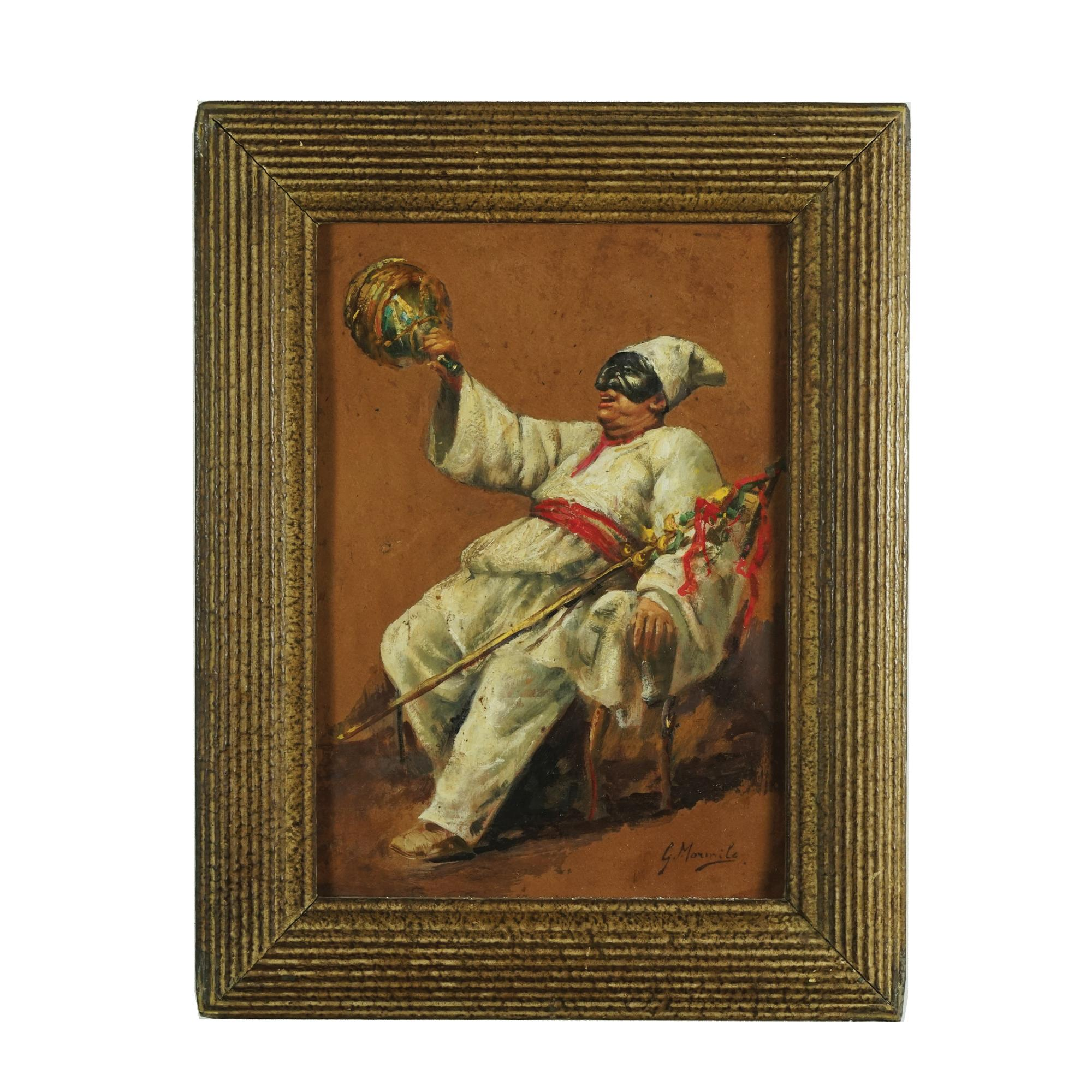
Drunk Pulcinella

Gaetano Mormile (1839, in Naples – 1890) was an Italian painter, mainly of genre subjects, often peasants in folkloric dress, but also vedute and Neo-Pompeian subjects.

== Biography ==
Mormille studied in the Academy of Naples under Giuseppe Mancinelli. Among his exhibited works were paintings titled Il girovago (The Rover) La Guzla (Turin), Vien lo Sposo (Here comes the Groom) (Milan). Monday after Pentecost (Brussels); Vanità precoce (Precocious Vanity); Fra Girolamo Savonarola; Il ritorno dalla Madonna dell' Arco (The Return of the Madonna of the Arch; Il Racconto (The Tale); and La Matassa (The Skein). In 1884 at Turin, he displayed Passa la Vacca (The Cow Passes); Tre per una lira (Three for a Lira); L'ombrello del frate (The Monk's Umbrella); Un' antica passione (An Ancient Passion).

In 1859 he first displayed at the Neapolitan Promotrice with paintings: such as Neapolitan Costume (1862) A Concert and Un Frate Questuante (A Mendicant Friar) (1863), Il Curato (The Cure) (1866). In Subsequent years, he displayed: Innocenza e Brio (Innocence and Brio) (1873, International Exhibition of Vienna); I Concorrenti (The Competitors), Una Visita (A Visit); La Difesa del Convento di San Marco (The defense of the Convent of San Marco); Il Messaggio Amoroso (The Message of Love), and At Pompeii (1877, National Exposition of Naples).

He opened a studio in via Chiatamone in Mergellina, Naples; and exhibited in Milan (1872-1885), Turin (1873-1882), Genoa (1873-1885), and Rome (1873). It is likely the painter Salvatore Mormile (also born 1839 in Naples) was his twin.
