= Vladimir Chernov =

Russian opera singer

Vladimir Nikolaïevitch Chernov (Russian: Владимир Николаевич Чернов; born 22 September 1953) is a Russian baritone, particularly associated with the Russian and Italian opera repertories.

== Early life ==
Vladimir Chernov was born in a small village near the town of Krasnodar in southern Russia. He studied at the Tchaikovsky Conservatory in Moscow. After graduating, he became a member of the Kirov Opera in Saint Petersburg in 1981. That same year he won a Special Jury Prize in the Glinka Competition. In 1982 the Kirov sent him to the Accademia della Scala where he studied with Giulietta Simionato. In 1983, he won second prize at the vocal competition "Voci Verdiane" (as well as the special Carlo Galetti prize) in Verdi's hometown of Busseto, Italy. Quickly, Vladimir Chernov attracted international attention.

== Career ==
=== Opera singer ===
As a member of the Kirov Opera of Saint Petersburg in 1987, he appeared at the Royal Opera House in London. Later performances were given at La Scala in Milan, the Vienna State Opera, the Paris Opéra, the Rome Opera, the Verona Arena, and others, mostly in the Italian repertory.

He made his Metropolitan Opera debut in 1991, as Sharpless in Madama Butterfly, and later took part in productions of Verdi operas such as Stiffelio, Simon Boccanegra, Don Carlo.

In addition to his great success in Italian operas, he often returned to his native repertory, appearing in Eugene Onegin, The Queen of Spades, War and Peace, Mazeppa.

=== University teaching appointment ===
From March 2005, Chernov became Regents' Lecturer in the Division of Voice and Opera of the Music Department of the University of California, Los Angeles. He coached young singers in both private and class lessons, taught two Master Classes which were open to the public, and performed in recital.

" He had not been seeking a teaching post when he was invited to accept a tenured teaching position, but in 2006 Chernov became a Professor of Vocal Studies in the Music Department. 'He completely won over the hearts and minds of the faculty and the students,' said Ian Krouse, chair of the music department....The post...enables him to continue his international singing career while serving as a mentor to those who will follow."

He is also a faculty member of Opera Ischia.
