= Vladimir Stoyanov =

Bulgarian operatic baritone

Vladimir Stoyanov (Bulgarian: Владимир Стоянов) is a Bulgarian operatic baritone. He graduated from Lyubomir Pipkov Music High-School in 1989 and the Pancho Vladigerov State Music Academy in 1995.

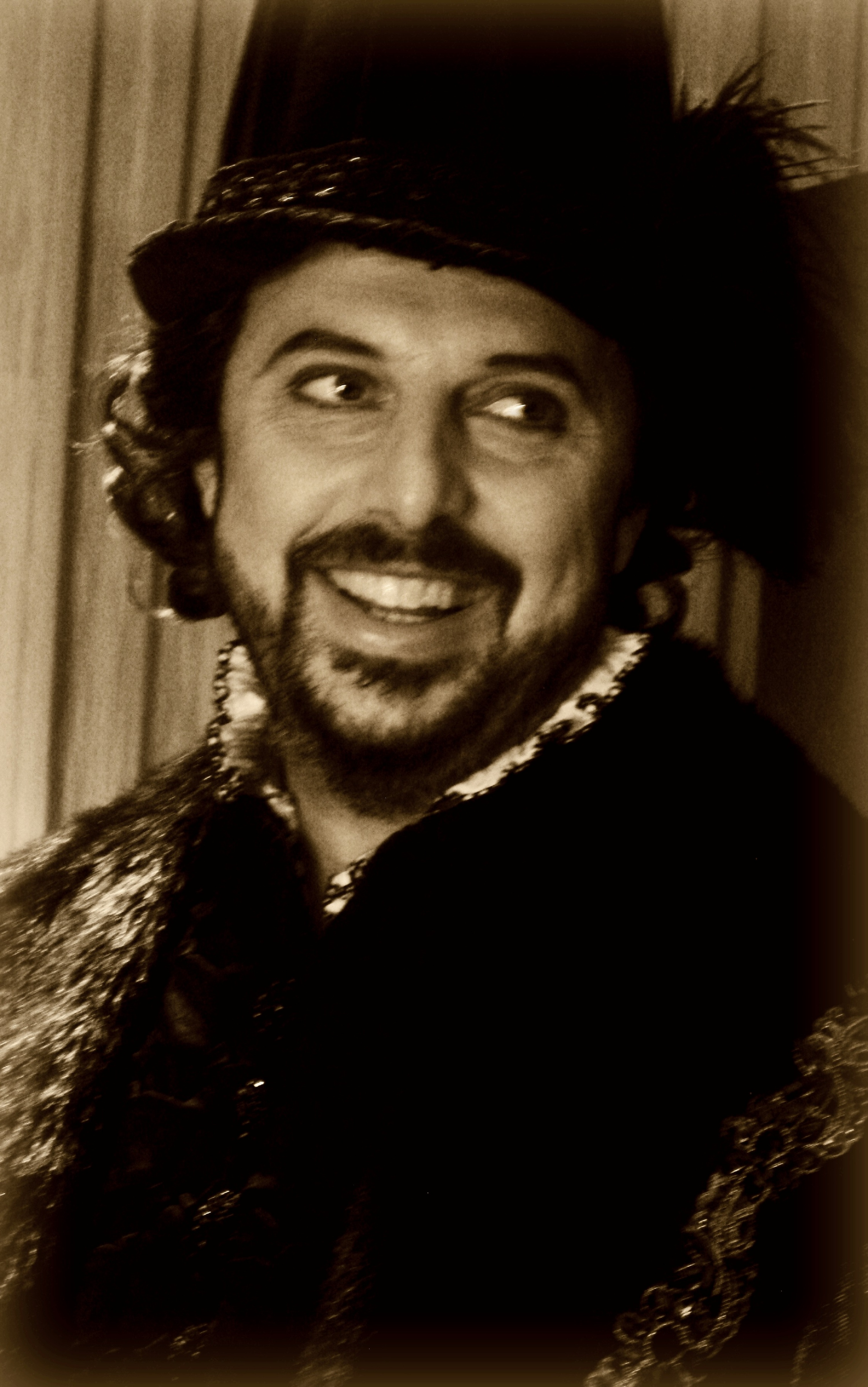
Vladimir Stoyanov with rittrato costume

== Early life ==
Vladimir Stoyanov was born in Pernik. There weren't any musicians in his family. His mother, Venera, was a nurse, and his father, Stoil, was a lawyer. He started singing when he was young in the choir of Prof. Zoya Vidas, where he sang for seven years. Later, when his voice started changating, his interest in opera singing grew, so he signed up in the National Music School "Lyubomir Pipkov". He graduated from the National Music Academy "Pancho Vladigerov" in Sofia.

Stoyanov made his debut on the stage of the Bourgas Opera House in 1993. In 1994 he took a specialization course at the Boris Hristov Academy in Rome with Nicola Ghiuselev. That year he also specialized at the Academy of the La Scala in Milan with Magda Olivero. Following three successful seasons with the Plovdiv Opera House, since 1999 he has been an independent soloist. Same year, he made his debut in Thracia Summer Music Festival with Plovdiv Philharmonic Orchestra.

== Career ==
Stoyanov made his debut in 1993 in the Burgas opera. In 1994 he specialized in the Bulgarian Academy of Arts and Culture "Boris Hristov" in Rome with Nikola Gyuzelev, whose bright character had a strong impact on the life of Vladimir. In the same year he specialized in the Academy of La Scala.

Later, he became a soloist in the Plovdiv opera, and in 1996 was his Sofian debut of Don Carlos by Verdi. His first appearance in Italy was two years later in the San Carlo theater in Naples. In 1999 he became a freelance soloist. Stoyanov is one of the most famous Bulgarian singers who earned international recognition across the globe.

He has performances in some of the largest theatres in the world, including La Scala (Milan), Staatsoper (Vienna), Metropolitan (New York), Opernhaus (Zürich), Unter den Linden (Berlin), La Fenice (Venice), Teatro Regio (Torino and Parma), Bellas Artes (Mexico), Teatro Real (Madrid), Kings Opera (Stockholm), Teatro Liceu (Barcelona), Teatro Dell'Opera (Rome), Teatro Massimo (Palermo), Kings Opera (Muscat), San Francisco Opera House (San Francisco), Tokyo, and Moscow.

He works with conductors such as Zubin Meta, Serji Ozava, Daniel Oren, Nello Santi, Riccardo Muti, Marco Armiliato, Chung, Gianluigi Gelmetti, Donato Renzetti, and Renato Palumbo, and directors such as Franco Zeffirelli, Pier Luigi Pizzi, Stefan Herheim, Ugo de Anna, Arno Bernard, and Stefani Mazzonis di Pralafera.

In November 2021, it was announced that Stoyanov will perform with Kazakh soprano Maria Mudryak at the Astana Opera House as part of a concert called “For You, My Kazakhstan.” The concert is being held to mark the 30th anniversary of the Independence of Kazakhstan and the Day of the First President.

== Personal life ==
Stoyanov lives in Sofia with his wife Katarina Nikolich, a Serbian-Italian opera singer, and his son Kaloyan Stoyanov (from his first marriage).
