= Francesco Regli =

Italian writer

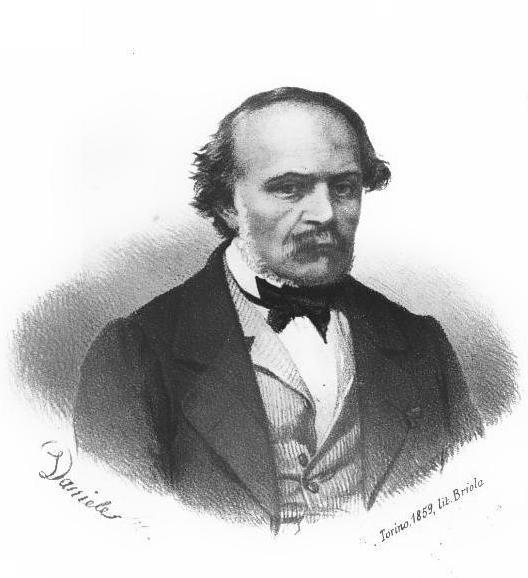
Francesco Regli in 1859

Francesco Regli (1802–1866) was an Italian writer best known today for his extensive biographical dictionary which chronicled the lives and careers of prominent figures in the performing arts in Italy from 1800 to 1860. Described as a "polygraph", Regli was also a poet, novelist, librettist, orator, theatre critic, and journalist. He was the founder and managing editor of several prominent journals of the time, including Il Pirata and Strenna Teatrale Europea.
