= Crispino e la comare =

1850 Italian opera by Luigi Ricci, Federico Ricci, and Francesco Maria Piave

Libretto title page, Venice 1850

Crispino e la comare o Il medico e la morte (The Cobbler and the Fairy or The Doctor and Death) is an opera written collaboratively by Luigi Ricci and Federico Ricci with an Italian libretto by Francesco Maria Piave.

== Performance history ==
The premiere took place on 28 February 1850 at the Teatro San Benedetto in Venice.

The work was very popular during the 19th century, and it was a favourite of Italian touring companies in the Americas and in the Asia-Pacific region.

The piece had its London premiere on 17 November 1857 at St James's Theatre. It was first performed in Paris on 4 April 1865 in Italian by the Théâtre Italien and was performed on 18 September 1869 as Le Docteur Crispin, with a French translation by Charles Nuitter and Alexandre Beaumont, at the Théâtre de l'Athénée on the rue Scribe. Its Calcutta premiere was in 1867 at the Calcutta Opera House, and its Australian premiere was on 11 August 1871 at the Princess Theatre (Melbourne).

The opera debuted in the United States in 1865 in New York. It was later staged by the Metropolitan Opera in 1919 and by the Amato Opera in 1980.

Though it was rarely performed in the 20th century, the Festival della Valle d'Itria in Martina Franca, Italy, staged the work as part of its 39th opera festival in July 2013. Bass-baritone Domenico Colaianni sang Crispino, while the role of Annetta was taken by Stefania Bonfadelli.

== Roles ==
Roles, voice types, premiere cast
Role	Voice type	Premiere cast, 28 February 1850
Crispino Tachetto, the cobbler	bass	Carlo Cambiaggio
Fabrizio, a doctor	baritone	Luigi Rinaldini
Mirabolano, a doctor and apothecary	bass	Luigi Ciardi
Contino del Fioro, a Tuscan nobleman	tenor	Giuseppe Pasi
Don Asdrubale di Caparotta, a Sicilian miser	bass	Angelo Guglielmini
Bortolo, a mason	tenor	
Annetta, Crispino's wife	soprano	Giovannina Pecorini
Lisetta	mezzo-soprano	Paolina Prinetti
La Comare, the fairy	mezzo-soprano	Giovannina Bordoni

== Synopsis ==
Place: Venice
Time: the 17th century

Crispino is a poor cobbler who cannot make ends meet. He is helped by a fairy who encourages him to start practicing medicine, though he cannot even read. He is successful with the fairy's help but cannot bear prosperity gracefully and mistreats his wife. The fairy makes him aware of his faults and the cobbler's family is happily reunited.

== Recordings ==
- 1938: An Italian film based on the opera was directed by Vincenzo Sorelli.
- 1974: Complete recording, RAI orchestra & chorus, conductor Marco della Chiesa; Mario Chiappi (Crispino), Emilia Raveglia (Annetta), Luisella Ciaffi-Ricagno, Gianfranco Pastine, Alesandro Corbelli & Angelo Nostri. MRF Records, private edition.
- 1994: A complete recording was made by the San Remo Symphonic Orchestra.
- 2015: A DVD recorded live at the 2013 Festival della Valle d'Itria was released by Dynamic with Domenico Colaianni as Crispino and Stefania Bonfadelli as Annetta; Chorus of the Teatro Petruzzelli di Bari; Orchestra Internazionale d'Italia; Jader Bignamini (conductor)
