= Salvatore Mormile =

Italian painter

Salvatore Mormile (Naples, November, 1839- ) was an Italian painter, mainly of genre figures and portraits.

== Biography ==
He studied at the Royal Institute of Fine Arts of Naples, where he garnered numerous prizes. He displayed in the 1869 National Exhibition of Naples: Il Savonarola. At the Promotrice of Naples, among his displayed works were: Un exelsior militare and Uno straordinario. He also painted Il mese mariano, and a number of genre scenes, including Le pompeiane dei secolo XIX. It is likely that he was a sibling of the better-known painter, Gaetano Mormile, also born in 1839 and active in Naples.
