= Roberto Tagliavini =

Italian singer and opera singer

Roberto Tagliavini, born 1976 in Parma, is an Italian operatic bass.

== Biography ==
Roberto Tagliavini studied singing with Romano Franceschetto, baritone. He appeared first of all in Italian opera houses including Teatro Regio, Parma and Teatro Comunale Bologna among others. He has subsequently appeared in many of the world's leading opera houses including La Scala, Milan, the Deutsche Oper Berlin, the Paris Opéra and many others. He made his debut at the Metropolitan Opera House, New York, as Colline in La Boheme in 2016. In 2017 he appeared at the Salzburg Festival as Loredano in Verdi's I due Foscari. Tagliavini won acclaim for his "beautiful singing" as Raimondo in Donizetti's Lucia di Lammermoor at the Teatro Real Madrid in 2018. He sings a wide repertory of bass parts including roles by Mozart, Rossini, Verdi, and others in staged operas as well as contributing to numerous concert performances.

== Select discography ==
- I due Foscari, with Leo Nucci, Roberto de Biasio, Tatiana Serjan cond Donato
- Les Pêcheurs de perles, with Patrizia Ciofi, Dmitry Korchak
