= Federico Ricci =

Italian opera composer

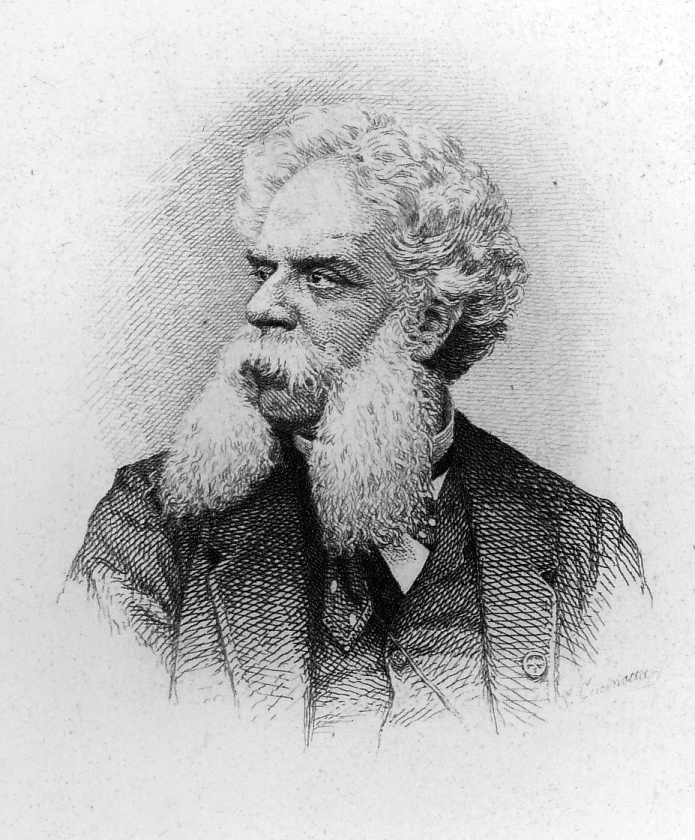
Federico Ricci, portrait by Cucinota, circa 1870.

Federico Ricci (22 October 1809 – 10 December 1877), was an Italian composer, particularly of operas. Born in Naples, he was the younger brother of Luigi Ricci, with whom he collaborated on several works.

Federico studied at Naples as had his brother. His first big success was with La prigione di Edimburgo, one of his best serious works. He stayed with serious subjects for several years, and of these Corrado d'Altamura was a particular success. However, his last collaboration with his brother, a comedy called Crispino e la comare, was hailed as the masterpiece of both composers, so Federico devoted himself thereafter entirely to comedy.

After another success closely followed by a major flop in Vienna, Federico took an official job teaching in St Petersburg and for 16 years he wrote no operas. In 1869 he moved to Paris, and there Une folie à Rome ran for 77 nights; other French comedies of his — mainly revisions of his own and his brother's earlier works — found some success. He also contributed the Recordare Jesu in the Sequentia to the Messa per Rossini. In 1870 for Cremona he created a pastiche, La vergine di Kermo, containing music by Pedrotti, Cagnoni, Ponchielli, Pacini, Rossi, and Mazzucato.

Although he did not have his brother's energy, Federico's scores are judged by some to be more skilfully written than Luigi's: for example, it has been said that La prigione di Edimburgo shows a sensitivity towards its subject (from Sir Walter Scott's The Heart of Midlothian) that is rare among Italian operas of the period. He died in Conegliano. His nephew Luigi Ricci-Stolz, also called Luigino (1852–1906), was also a composer.

== Operas ==
- 1835: Il colonello (also as La donna colonello) (with his brother Luigi Ricci)
- 1835: Monsieur de Chalumeaux
- 1836: Il disertore per amore (with his brother Luigi Ricci)
- 1838: La prigione di Edimburgo (Trieste, 18 March)
- 1839: Un duello sotto Richelieu
- 1841: Luigi Rolla e Michelangelo (Florence, 30 March)
- 1841: Corrado d'Altamura (La Scala, Milan, 16 November)
- 1842: Vallombra
- 1845: Isabella de'Medici
- 1846: Estella di Murcia
- 1846: L'amante di richiamo (with his brother Luigi)
- 1847: Griselda
- 1850: Crispino e la comare, ossia Il medico e la morte (with his brother Luigi) (Venice San Benedetto, 28 February 1850, rev. 1869: as Le docteur Crispin)
- 1850: I due ritratti
- 1852: Il marito e l'amante (rev. 1872: as Une fête à Venise)
- 1853: Il paniere d 'amore
- 1869: Une folie à Rome (Paris)
- 1870: La vergine di Kermo (Cremona)
- 1872: Le docteur Rose, ou La dogaresse
- 1876: Don Quichotte (incomplete)
