= List of operas by Giovanni Pacini =

This is a complete list of operas by Giovanni Pacini (1796–1867).

== List ==
| Title | Genre | Acts | Libretto | Première date | Place, theatre |
|---|---|---|---|---|---|
| Don Pomponio | opera buffa | | | composed 1813, but unperformed | |
| Annetta e Lucindo | farsa | 1 act | Francesco Marconi | 17 October 1813 | Milan, Teatro San Radegonda |
| La ballerina raggiratrice | opera buffa | | | Spring 1814 | Florence, Teatro alla Pergola |
| L'ambizione delusa | opera buffa | 2 acts | Giuseppe Palomba | Easter 1814 | Florence, Teatro alla Pergola |
| L'escavazione del tesoro | farsa | 1 act | Francesco Marconi | 18 December 1814 | Pisa |
| Gli sponsali de' silfi | commedia | 2 acts | Francesco Marconi | 1814–15 | Milan, Teatro de' Filodrammatici |
| Bettina vedova (Il seguito di Ser Marcantonio) | dramma giocoso | 2 acts | Angelo Anelli | Spring 1815 | Venice, Teatro San Moisè |
| La Rosina | farsa | 1 act | Giuseppe Palomba | Summer 1815 | Florence, Teatro alla Pergola |
| L'ingenua | farsa | 1 act | Francesco Marconi | 4 May 1816 | Venice, Teatro San Benedetto |
| Il matrimonio per procura | dramma giocoso | 1 act | Giordano Scannamusa and Angelo Anelli | 2 January 1817 | Milan, Teatro Rè |
| Dalla beffa il disinganno, ossia La poetessa (revised as Il carnevale di Milano) | farsa | 1 act | Gasparo Scopabirbe and Angelo Anelli | 1816–1817, revision 23 February 1817 | Milan, Teatro Rè |
| Piglia il mondo come viene | dramma giocoso | 2 acts | Angelo Anelli | 28 May 1817 | Milan, Teatro Rè |
| Adelaide e Comingio (also as: Isabella e Florange, Il comingio, Comingio pittore) | opera semiseria | 2 acts | Gaetano Rossi | 30 December 1817 | Milan, Teatro Rè |
| Atala | opera seria | 3 acts | Antonio Peracchi after Chateaubriand | June 1818 | Padua, Teatro Nuovo |
| Gl'illinesi | opera seria | | Felice Romani | composed 1818, but unperformed | |
| Il barone di Dolsheim (also as: Federico II re di Prussia, Il barone di Felcheim, La colpa emendata dal valore) | opera semiseria | 2 acts | Felice Romani after Pigault Le Brun | 23 September 1818 | Milan, Teatro alla Scala |
| La sposa fedele | opera semiseria | 2 acts | Gaetano Rossi | 14 January 1819 | Venice, Teatro San Benedetto |
| Il falegname di Livonia | dramma giocoso | 2 acts | Felice Romani after Alexandre-Vincent Pineux Duval | 12 April 1819 | Milan, Teatro alla Scala |
| Vallace, o L'eroe scozzese (also as: Odoardo I re d'Inghilterra) | opera seria | 2 acts | Felice Romani | 14 February 1820 | Milan, Teatro alla Scala |
| La sacerdotessa d'Irminsul | eroico | 2 acts | Felice Romani | 11 May 1820 | Trieste, Teatro Grande |
| La schiava in Bagdad, ossia Il papucciajo | dramma giocoso | 2 acts | Vincenzo Pezzi | 28 October 1820 | Turin, Teatro Carignano |
| La gioventù di Enrico V (also as: La bella tavernara, ossia Le avventure d'una notte) | dramma giocoso | 2 acts | Filippo Tarducci | 26 December 1820 | Rome, Teatro Valle |
| Cesare in Egitto | eroico | 2 acts | Jacopo Ferretti | 26 December 1821 | Rome, Teatro Argentina |
| La vestale | opera seria | 2 acts | Luigi Romanelli after Victor-Joseph Étienne de Jouy | 6 February 1823 | Milan, Teatro alla Scala |
| Temistocle | opera seria | 2 acts | Pietro Anguillesi after Metastasio | 23 August 1823 | Lucca, Teatro del Giglio |
| Isabella ed Enrico | opera semiseria | 2 acts | Luigi Romanelli | 12 June 1824 | Milan, Teatro alla Scala |
| Alessandro nelle Indie | opera seria | 2 acts | Giovanni Schmidt after Metastasio | 29 September 1824 | Naples, Teatro San Carlo |
| Amazilia | opera seria | 1 act | Giovanni Schmidt | 6 July 1825 | Naples, Teatro San Carlo |
| L'ultimo giorno di Pompei | opera seria | 2 acts | Andrea Leone Tottola | 19 November 1825 | Naples, Teatro San Carlo |
| La gelosia corretta | opera semiseria | 3 acts | Luigi Romanelli | 27 March 1826 | Milan, Teatro alla Scala |
| Niobe | opera seria | 2 acts | Andrea Leone Tottola | 19 November 1826 | Naples, Teatro San Carlo |
| Gli arabi nelle Gallie, ossia Il trionfo della fede (revised 1855 as: L'ultimo dei clodovei) | opera seria | 2 acts | Luigi Romanelli after Charles-Victor Prévost d'Arlincourt | 8 March 1827 | Milan, Teatro alla Scala |
| Margherita regina d'Inghilterra (also as: Margherita d'Anjou) | opera seria | 2 acts | Andrea Leone Tottola | 19 November 1827 | Naples, Teatro San Carlo |
| I cavalieri di Valenza | tragico | 2 acts | Gaetano Rossi | 11 June 1828 | Milan, Teatro alla Scala |
| I crociati a Tolemaide, ossia Malek-Adel (also as: La morte di Malek-Adel) | opera seria | 2 acts | Calisto Bassi | 13 November 1828 | Trieste, Teatro Grande |
| Il talismano, ovvero La terza crociata in Palestina | opera storica | 3 acts | Gaetano Barbieri after Walter Scott | 10 June 1829 | Milan, Teatro alla Scala |
| I fidanzati, ossia Il contestabile di Chester | romantico | 3 acts | Domenico Gilardoni after Walter Scott | 19 November 1829 | Naples, Teatro San Carlo |
| Giovanna d'Arco | opera seria | Introduction and 4 acts | Gaetano Barbieri after Friedrich Schiller | 14 March 1830 | Milan, Teatro alla Scala |
| Il corsaro | romantico | 2 acts | Jacopo Ferretti after Byron | 15 January 1831 | Rome, Teatro Apollo |
| Il rinnegato portoghese (also as: Gusmano d'AlMayda) | opera seria | | Luigi Romanelli | composed 1831, but unperformed | |
| Ivanhoe | opera seria | 2 acts | Gaetano Rossi after Walter Scott | 19 March 1832 | Venice, Teatro La Fenice |
| Don Giovanni Tenorio, o Il convitato di pietra | farsa | 2 acts | Giovanni Bertati after Tirso de Molina | 1832 | Viareggio, Casa Belluomini |
| Gli elvezi, ovvero Corrado di Tochemburgo | opera seria | 2 acts | Gaetano Rossi | 12 January 1833 | Naples, Teatro San Carlo |
| Fernando duca di Valenza | opera seria | 1 act | Paolo Pola | 30 May 1833 | Naples, Teatro San Carlo |
| Irene, o L'assedio di Messina | opera seria | 3 acts | Gaetano Rossi | 30 November 1833 | Naples, Teatro San Carlo |
| Carlo di Borgogna | romantico | 3 acts | Gaetano Rossi | 21 February 1835 | Venice, Teatro La Fenice |
| La foresta d'Hermanstadt | opera buffa | | Uncertain | 1839 | Viareggio, private performances |
| Furio Camillo | tragico | 3 acts | Jacopo Ferretti | 26 December 1839 | Rome, Teatro Apollo |
| Saffo | tragedia lirica | 3 acts | Salvadore Cammarano after Pietro Beltrame | 29 November 1840 | Naples, Teatro San Carlo |
| L'uomo del mistero | opera semiseria | 2 acts | Domenico Andreotti after Walter Scott | 9 November 1841 | Naples, Teatro Nuovo |
| Il duca d'Alba (also as: Adolfo di Werbel) | tragedia lirica | 2 acts | Giovanni Peruzzini and Francesco Maria Piave | 26 February 1842 | Venice, Teatro La Fenice |
| La fidanzata corsa | tragico | 3 acts | Salvadore Cammarano after Prosper Mérimée | 10 December 1842 | Naples, Teatro San Carlo |
| Maria, regina d'Inghilterra | tragedia lirica | 3 acts | Leopoldo Tarantini after Victor Hugo | 11 February 1843 | Palermo, Teatro Carolino |
| Medea (revised for Vicenza in 1845) | melodramma tragico | 3 acts | Benedetto Castiglia after Euripides | 28 November 1843 | Palermo, Teatro Carolino |
| Luisetta, ossia La cantatrice del molo di Napoli | commedia | 2 acts | Leopoldo Tarantini | 13 December 1843 | Naples, Teatro Nuovo |
| L'ebrea | opera seria | 3 acts | Giacomo Sacchero after Eugène Scribe's libretto La juive for Fromental Halévy | 27 February 1844 | Milan, Teatro alla Scala |
| Lorenzino de' Medici (revised as: Rolandino di Torresmondo) | tragedia lirica | 2 acts | Francesco Maria Piave after Alexandre Dumas, père | 4 March 1845 | Venice, Teatro La Fenice |
| Bondelmonte (later known as Buondelmonte) | tragedia lirica | 3 acts | Salvadore Cammarano after Voltaire | 18 June 1845 | Florence, Teatro alla Pergola |
| Stella di Napoli | dramma lirico | 3 acts | Salvadore Cammarano | 11 December 1845 | Naples, Teatro San Carlo |
| La regina di Cipro | dramma lirico | 4 acts | Francesco Guidi | 7 February 1846 | Turin, Teatro Regio |
| Merope | tragedia lirica | 3 acts | Salvadore Cammarano after Vittorio Alfieri and Voltaire | 25 November 1847 | Naples, Teatro San Carlo |
| Ester d'Engaddi | opera seria | 3 acts | Francesco Guidi after Silvio Pellico | 1 February 1848 | Turin, Teatro Regio |
| Allan Cameron | opera seria | 4 acts | Francesco Maria Piave | 18 March 1848 | Venice, Teatro La Fenice |
| L'orfana svizzera | opera semiseria | | Francesco Rubino | 1848 | Naples, Teatro del Fondo |
| Zaffira, o La riconciliazione | opera semiseria | 3 acts | Achille de Lauzières | 15 November 1851 | Naples, Teatro Nuovo |
| Malvina di Scozia | tragedia lirica | 3 acts | Salvadore Cammarano after Inès de Castro by Antoine Houdar de la Motte | 27 December 1851 | Naples, Teatro San Carlo |
| L'assedio di Leida (also known as Elnava) | opera seria | | | composed in 1852(?), but unperformed | |
| Rodrigo di Valenza | opera seria | | | composed for Carnival 1852-1853, but unperformed | |
| Il Cid | opera seria | 3 acts | Achille de Lauzières after Pierre Corneille | 12 March 1853 | Milan, Teatro alla Scala |
| Lidia di Brabante | opera seria | 3 acts | Cesare Perrini after Massimo d'Azeglio's Niccolò de' Lapi | 1853 | Palermo, Teatro Carolino |
| Romilda di Provenza | opera seria | 3 acts | Gaetano Micci | 8 December 1853 | Naples, Teatro San Carlo |
| La donna delle isole | opera seria | 3 acts | Francesco Maria Piave | intended for Carnival 1853-1854, but unperformed | |
| La punizione | opera seria | | Giuseppe Cencetti and Cesare Perrini | 8 March 1854 | Venice, Teatro La Fenice |
| Margherita Pusterla | opera seria | 2 acts | Domenico Bolognese after Cesare Cantù | 25 February 1856 | Naples, Teatro San Carlo |
| I portoghesi nel Brasile | opera seria | | Achille de Lauzières | composed 1856, but unperformed? | For Rio de Janeiro, Teatro Italiano |
| Il saltimbanco | dramma lirico | 3 acts | Giuseppe Checchetelli | 24 May 1858 | Rome, Teatro Argentina |
| Lidia di Bruxelles | opera seria | 3 acts | Cesare Perrini after Massimo D'Azeglio's Niccolò de' Lapi | 21 October 1858 | Bologna, Teatro Comunale |
| Gianni di Nisida | opera seria | 4 acts | Giuseppe Checchetelli | 29 October 1860 | Rome, Teatro Argentina |
| Il mulattiere di Toledo | commedia lirico | 5 acts | Giuseppe Cencetti | 25 May 1861 | Rome, Teatro Apollo |
| Belfagor | opera semiseria | Prologue and 4 acts | Antonio Lanari after Niccolò Machiavelli | 1 December 1861 | Florence, Teatro alla Pergola |
| Carmelita | opera seria | 3 acts | Francesco Maria Piave after Alexandre Dumas, père | composed 1863, but unperformed | |
| Don Diego di Mendoza | opera fantastica | 3 acts | Francesco Maria Piave after Alexandre Dumas, père | 12 January 1867 | Venice, Teatro La Fenice |
| Berta di Varnol | opera seria | 3 acts | Francesco Maria Piave | 6 April 1867 | Naples, Teatro San Carlo |
| Niccolò de' Lapi | melodramma tragico | 3 acts | Cesare Perrini after Massimo D'Azeglio's Niccolò de' Lapi | 29 October 1873 | Florence, Teatro Pagliano |

== Doubtful attributions to Pacini ==
- La chiarina (Carnival (1815–1816 San Moisè, Venice) [probable confusion with work by Giuseppe Farinelli]
- I virtuosi di teatro (1817 private performance, Venice) [possibly by Simon Mayr]
- La bottega di caffè (1817 private performance, Venice) [possibly by Francesco Gardi]
