= 1820 in music =

This is a list of music-related events in 1820.

== Events ==
- Pietro Raimondi returns to Naples and begins his career as an opera composer.
- The Musical Fund Society is founded at Musical Fund Hall in Philadelphia. Its first public concert on April 22, 1821, featured Beethoven's 2nd Symphony.
- Franz Liszt plays in public for the first time in Ödenburg.

== Popular music ==
- "Hail to the Chief" – words, Sir Walter Scott; music James Sanderson
- "London Cheats" aka "There Never Were Such Times" sung by Joseph Grimaldi in The Yellow Drawf or Harlequin Knight of the Golden Moon"
- "D'ye Ken John Peel" – words, John Woodcock Graves. music traditional.

== Classical music ==
- Ludwig van Beethoven – Piano Sonata No. 30
- Franz Berwald – Violin Concerto in C sharp minor, Op. 2
- Fanny Hensel – "Annette", H-U 14
- Friedrich Kuhlau
  - 3 Sonatinas, Op.20
  - Fantasy and Variations, Op.25
- Felix Mendelssohn
  - "Raste Krieger, Krieg ist aus" MWV K 2
  - Violin Sonata in F major, MWV Q 7
  - Recitativo in E minor, MWV U 11
  - Piano Piece in E minor, MWV U 12
  - Piano Piece in E minor, MWV U 18
- Ignaz Moscheles – Piano Concerto No.3, Op.58
- Ferdinand Ries – Sextet, Op.100 (On "The Last Rose of Summer")
- Friedrich Schneider – Das Weltgericht, Op.46
- Franz Schubert
  - Lazarus, oratorio
  - Quartettsatz, D. 703
  - Psalm 23, D.706
- Louis Spohr
  - Grand Rondo in G major for violin and piano, Op. 51
  - Potpourri on Irish Themes in A major, Op. 59
  - Potpourri on Themes from Mozart's Die Zauberflöte for violin and piano in F-sharp minor, Op. 50
  - Quintet for piano and winds in C minor, Op. 52
  - Symphony No. 2 in D minor, Op. 49
  - Violin Concerto No. 9 in D minor, Op. 55

== Opera ==
- Juan Crisóstomo Arriaga – Los Esclavos Felices (premiere in Bilbao)
- Michele Carafa – I due Figaro (premiere June 6 at La Scala, Milan)
- Friedrich Kuhlau – Elisa, eller Venskab og Kjærlighed, Op.29 (premiered April 17 in Copenhagen)
- Giovanni Pacini – La schiava in Bagdad (premiere October 28 at Teatro Carignano, Turin)
- Gioacchino Rossini – Maometto II (premiered December 3 at Real Teatro di San Carlo, Naples)
- Franz Schubert – Sakuntala, D. 701 (started, never finished)

== Births ==
- January 9 – Pavel Křížkovský, conductor and composer (d. 1885)
- February 10 – Cornelius Gurlitt, composer (d. 1901)
- February 17 – Henri Vieuxtemps, violinist and composer (d. 1881)
- March 7 – Gustav Graben-Hoffmann, German composer and voice teacher (d. 1900)
- March 24 – Fanny Crosby, American lyricist (d. 1915)
- May 21 – Michel Lentz, lyricist of the Luxembourg national anthem (d. 1893)
- June 22 – Franz Kroll, pianist (died 1877)
- July 7 – George Cooper, organist (died 1876)
- July 20 – Enrico Crivelli, Italian opera singer (d. 1870)
- July 26 – Maria Severa Onofriana, Portuguese singer and guitarist, considered the founder of fado (d. 1846)
- August 13 – George Grove, music writer (d. 1900)
- August 30 – George Frederick Root, songwriter (d. 1895)
- September 5 – Louis Köhler, pianist, composer and conductor (d. 1886)
- October 6 – Jenny Lind, Swedish singer (d. 1887)
- December 17 – Karl Anton Eckert, conductor and composer (d. 1879)
- date unknown
  - Maria Severa Onofriana, fado singer (d. 1846)
  - Anna-Kajsa Norman, Swedish folk musician (d. 1903)

== Deaths ==
- February 2 – Peder Schall, composer (b. 1762)
- March 26 – Jean-Étienne Despréaux, French dancer, choreographer and composer (b. 1748)
- August 6 – Antonín Vranický, Bohemian violinist and composer (b. 1761)
- August 28 – Antonín Kraft, cellist and composer (b. 1749)
- October 3 – Ludwig Wenzel Lachnith, horn player and composer (b. 1746)
- date unknown – Marie Bigot, piano teacher (b. 1786)
- probable
  - Mikhail Matinsky, scientist, writer and composer (b. 1750)
  - Louis Joseph Saint-Amans, composer (b. 1749)
