= Savino Monelli =

Italian tenor (1784–1836)

- Born: 9 May 1784; Fermo, Italy
- Died: 5 June 1836 (aged 52); Fermo, Italy
- Occupation: Opera singer (tenor)

Savino Monelli (9 May 1784 – 5 June 1836) was an Italian tenor prominent in the opera houses of Italy from 1806 until 1830. Amongst the numerous roles he created in world premieres were Giannetto in Rossini's La gazza ladra, Enrico in Donizetti's L'ajo nell'imbarazzo and Nadir in Pacini's La schiava in Bagdad. He was born in Fermo where he initially studied music. After leaving the stage, he retired to Fermo and died there five years later at the age of 52.

== Life and career ==
Monelli was born in Fermo and received his early music training under Giuseppe Giordani who was the maestro di cappella of the Fermo Cathedral. His elder brother, Raffaele (1782–1859) likewise trained under Giordani and had a career as a tenor appearing in the world premieres of Rossini's La scala di seta and L'inganno felice. One of Monelli's earliest performances was in 1806 when he appeared with Raffaele in a production of Marcello Bernardini's Furberia e puntiglio at the Teatro della Concordia in Jesi.

In the early years of his career, Monelli sang in several premieres at the Teatro Ducale in Parma and the Teatro San Moisè in Venice and went on to sing in Naples between 1811 and 1814 where he appeared at the Teatro San Carlo and the Teatro dei Fiorentini. He made his debut at La Scala in April 1816 as Tamino in the theatre's first production of The Magic Flute. Monelli remained at La Scala through the 1817 season where he appeared in the premieres of several operas, most notably as Giannetto in Rossini's La gazza ladra. In December 1817 he sang in another Rossini premiere as Adalberto in Adelaide di Borgogna, this time at the Teatro Argentina in Rome.

From 1818 through 1819 Monelli was in Barcelona as a member of the Teatre de la Santa Creu's Italian opera company directed by Pietro Generali. His performances there included the leading tenor roles in three Rossini operas—La Cenerentola, Il barbiere di Siviglia, and La Gazza Ladra. On his return to Italy in 1820 he created the role of Nadir in the world premiere of Pacini's La schiava in Bagdad at the Teatro Carignano in Turin. The 1821 season found him singing in Rome at the Teatro Argentina and the Teatro Apollo, and in 1822 he returned to the stage at La Scala where remained until 1823, again singing in several world premieres.

Monelli's last major stage performances were in Bologna where he had been a member of the Accademia Filarmonica di Bologna since 1813. From 1829 to 1830 he sang in four operas at the Teatro Comunale including La Cenerentola as Don Ramiro and L'italiana in Algeri as Lindoro. The following year he retired to Fermo where he remained active in the musical life of the city. According to an obituary published in Bologna shortly after his death, he had amassed a small fortune during his career as a singer which provided him with comfortable retirement. After a year of deteriorating health, Monelli died in Fermo in 1836 at the age of 52.

Monelli had a high tenor voice, or tenore contraltino, which made him particularly suited to roles such as Giannetto in La Gazza ladra. Contemporary accounts described it variously as sweet but delicate, at times overwhelmed in large theatres, but flexible, refined and perfectly schooled.

== Roles created ==
Roles created by Monelli in world premieres include:

- Gastone in Raoul di Crequi – composed by Luigi Antonio Calegari, libretto by Giulio Artusi; premiered Teatro Ducale, Parma, 2 February 1808
- Corradino in Corradino – composed by Francesco Morlacchi, libretto by Antonio Simeone Sografi; premiered Teatro Ducale, Parma, 27 February 1808
- Fernando-Indatirso in Le lagrime d'una vedova – composed by Pietro Generali, libretto by Giuseppe Maria Foppa; premiered Teatro San Moisè, Venice, 26 December 1808
- Corradino in Il trionfo delle belle, ovvero Corradino cuor di ferro – composed by Stefano Pavesi, libretto by Gaetano Rossi; premiered Teatro San Moisè, Venice, 4 February 1809
- Floridoro in Amore, ed avarizia – composed by Valentino Fioravanti, libretto by Jacopo Ferretti and Andrea Leone Tottola; premiered Teatro Valle, Rome, 26 December 1810
- Ernesto in Gli amori e l'armi – composed by Giuseppe Mosca, libretto by Giuseppe Palomba; premiered Teatro dei Fiorentini, Naples, 29 March 1812
- Eginardo in Eginardo e Lisbetta – composed by Pietro Generali, librettist unknown; premiered Teatro dei Fiorentini, Naples, 10 June 1813
- Edmondo in Elena – composed by Simon Mayr, libretto by Andrea Leone Tottola; premiered Teatro dei Fiorentini, Naples, 28 January 1814
- Emerico in Clotilde – composed by Carlo Coccia, libretto by Gaetano Rossi; premiered Teatro San Benedetto, Venice, 8 June 1815
- Il generale in La Chiarina – composed by Giuseppe Farinelli, libretto by Angelo Anelli; premiered La Scala, Milan, 14 June 1816
- Giulio Cesare in La gioventù di Cesare – composed by Stefano Pavesi, libretto by Felice Romani; premiered La Scala, Milan, 7 April 1817
- Giannetto in La gazza ladra – composed by Gioachino Rossini, libretto by Giovanni Gherardini; premiered La Scala, Milan, 31 May 1817
- Don Ramiro in Le zingare dell'Asturia – composed by Carlo Soliva, libretto by Felice Romani; premiered La Scala, Milan, 5 August 1817
- Noradino in Adele di Lusignano – composed by Michele Carafa, libretto by Felice Romani; premiered La Scala, Milan, 27 September 1817
- Adelberto in Adelaide di Borgogna – composed by Gioachino Rossini, libretto by Giovanni Schmidt; premiered Teatro Argentina, Rome, 27 December 1817
- Noradino in Adele di Lusignano – composed by Ramón Carnicer, libretto by Felice Romani; premiered Teatre de la Santa Creu, Barcelona, 15 May 1819
- Nadir in La schiava in Bagdad – composed by Giovanni Pacini, libretto by Vincenzo Pezzi; premiered Teatro Carignano, Turin, 28 October 1820
- Gollovino in L'olandese in Russia – composed by Domenico Capranica, libretto by the composer; premiered Teatro Argentina, Rome, 9 September 1821
- Ernesto in Lo sposo di provincia – composed by Giacomo Cordella, libretto by Giovanni Schmidt; premiered Teatro Argentina, Rome, 29 September 1821
- Don Ormondo in La capricciosa ed il soldato – composed by Michele Carafa, libretto by Jacopo Ferretti, premiered Teatro Apollo, Rome, 26 December 1821
- Colonel D'Alberg in Il posto abbandonato – composed by Saverio Mercadante, libretto by Felice Romani; premiered La Scala, Milan, 21 September 1822
- Don Ramiro in Chiara e Serafina – composed by Gaetano Donizetti, libretto by Felice Romani; premiered La Scala, Milan, 26 October 1822
- Aldano in Amleto – composed by Saverio Mercadante, libretto by Felice Romani; premiered La Scala, Milan, 26 December 1822
- Cinna in La vestale – composed by Giovanni Pacini, libretto by Luigi Romanelli; premiered La Scala, Milan, 6 February 1823
- Enrico in L'ajo nell'imbarazzo – composed by Gaetano Donizetti, libretto by Jacopo Ferretti; premiered Teatro Valle, Rome, 4 February 1824
