= Brigida Lorenzani =

Italian opera singer (1805–1881)

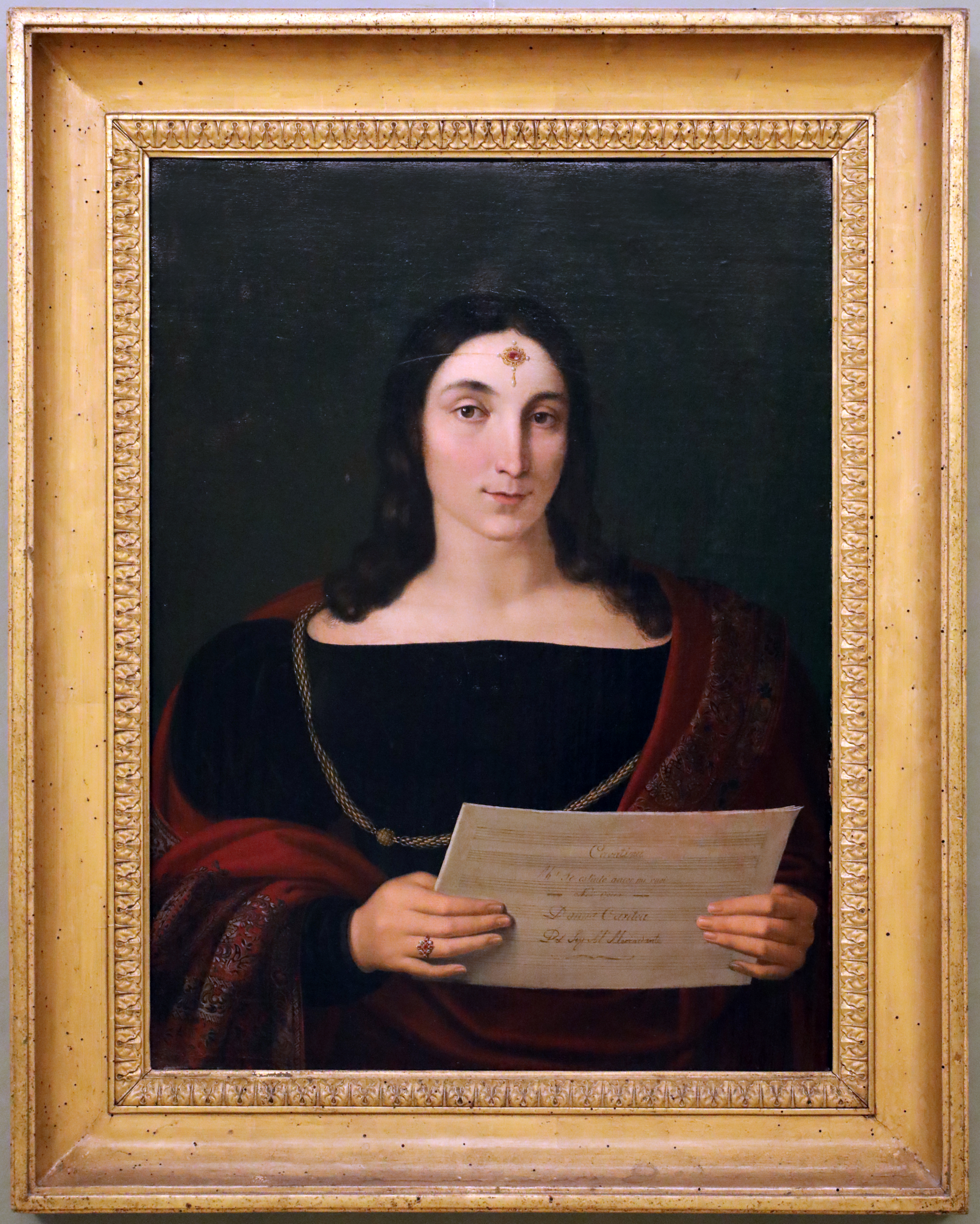
- Portrait by Michele Ridolfi, 1822
- Born: 1805; Brescello, Emilia-Romagna
- Died: 9 March 1881 (aged 75–76); Lucca
- Occupation: Operatic

Brigida Lorenzani (1805, Brescello, Emilia-Romagna – 9 March 1881, Lucca) was an Italian operatic contralto. She was also known as Brigida Lorenzani Nerici.

== Career ==
Lorenzani started singing professionally in 1820 and soon began appearing at the historic La Scala opera house in Milan. She performed as Zomira in Ricciardo e Zoraide in 1822.

The German composer Giacomo Meyerbeer created the role of Felicia in Il crociato in Egitto for Lorenzani, who starred in the premiere at La Fenice in 1824. Later that year, she played Mirteo in the premiere of Nitocri at the Teatro Regio in Turin.

Lorenzani was associated with the works of Saverio Mercadante and Giovanni Pacini, among others. She was part of the premiere cast in such operas as Caritea, regina di Spagna (1826), Elvida (1826), Gli arabi nelle Gallie (1827), and Il Montanaro (1827).

Lorenzani was married to Frediano Nerici, a surgeon from Lucca. When Nerici fell ill, Lorenzani retired from the stage to care for her husband and family.
