= Der Vampyr (Lindpaintner) =

Der Vampyr (The Vampire) is an opera (designated as a Romantische Oper) in three acts by Peter Josef von Lindpaintner. The German libretto by Cäsar Max Hegel was based on a work by Heinrich Ludwig Ritter, based in turn on a French melodrama by Charles Nodier, Pierre Carmouche and Achille de Jouffroy, ultimately traceable to the short story "The Vampyre" (1819) by John William Polidori, although Lindpaintner's libretto credits, erroneously, Lord Byron.

Other early 19th-century operas on the same theme were Silvestro de Palma's I vampiri (1812), Martin-Joseph Mengal's Le vampire (1826), and Heinrich Marschner's Der Vampyr of the same year as Lindpaintner's opera (1828).

== Performance history ==
The first performance took place at the Hoftheater in Stuttgart on 21 September 1828. It proved the most successful of the composer's operas.

Lindpaintner made a revised version of the opera in 1850, when he put recitatives in the place of the original spoken dialogue.

== Roles ==
Roles, voice types, premiere cast
Role	Voice type	Premiere cast, 21 September 1828 Conductor: Peter Josef von Lindpaintner
Ignerand, Count Port d'Amour	bass	Christian Wilhelm Häser
Isolde, Ignerand's daughter	soprano	Caterina Canzi
Hypolit, Count Damartin, Isolde's bridegroom	tenor	August Carl Hambuch
Count Aubri, the vampire	bass	Gustav Petzold
Balbine, Isolde's maid	mezzo-soprano	
Etienne, gardener to Port d'Amour	bass	
Morton	bass	
Lorette, Morton's daughter	soprano	
Lavigne, her bridegroom	tenor	

== Synopsis ==
The scene of the action is in the south of France (not Scotland), though in general it follows the same story as Marschner's Der Vampyr.
