= Nitocri =

Nitocri is an opera (melodramma serio) in two acts composed by Saverio Mercadante to libretto by Apostolo Zeno adapted by Lodovico Piossasco Feys. The libretto is a fictionalised account of the Egyptian queen Nitocris. The opera premiered at the Teatro Regio in Turin on 26 December 1824.

== Background and performance history ==
According to Francesco Florimo, the opera was "well received" at its premiere. A second revised version was performed at the Teatro della Canobbiana in Milan on 2 October 1830 with newly designed sets by Alessandro Sanquirico.

Although the opera fell into oblivion, Mirteo's aria "Se m'abbandoni", sung at the premiere by Brigida Lorenzani en travesti, became a popular concert piece for contraltos and mezzo-sopranos and was sometimes interpolated into other operas, notably by Maria Malibran in the final scene of Zingarelli's Giulietta e Romeo.

== Roles ==
Roles, voice types, premiere cast
Role	Voice type	Premiere cast, 26 December 1824 Conductor: Giovanni Battista Polledro
Nitocri (Nitocris), Queen of Egypt, in love with Mirteo	soprano	Caterina Canzi
Mirteo, an Egyptian general, in love with Emirena	contralto	Brigida Lorenzani
Emirena, Nitocri's sister	soprano	Carolina Franchini
Feraspe, prince descended from the ancient kings of Egypt, in love with Nitocri	tenor	Nicola Tacchinardi
Micerino, an Egyptian general, Mirteo's friend, in love with Emirena	bass	Luciano Bianchi
Idaspe, Nitocri's confidante	tenor	Lorenzo Lombardi
Ramiro, Feraspe's confidante	soprano	Vittoria Smitt
Royal guards, Nitocri's handmaidens, government officials, Egyptian and Theban soldiers, Egyptian people

== Recordings ==
There are no complete recordings of the opera. However, the overture was recorded by the Orchestra Sinfonica Moldova for Mercadante: Sinfonie da Opere (Bongiovanni GB2144), and Mirteo's aria "Se m'abbandoni" sung by Della Jones appears on A Hundred Years of Italian Opera 1820–1830 (Opera Rara ORCH104)
