= Malvina di Scozia =

Malvina di Scozia is a dramma tragico (tragic opera) in three acts by Giovanni Pacini. Salvadore Cammarano wrote the Italian language libretto.

Malvina di Scozia was beset by obstacles at its 1851 Naples premiere. Pacini’s collaborator, the experienced librettist Salvadore Cammarano, was mortally ill. The opera’s subject matter, the history of Inês de Castro and depicting the sordid behavior of the nobility, aroused unwanted attention from the royal censors of the King of Naples. The composer and librettist were forced to change the action from Portugal to ancient Scotland for fear of offending the King. So, unlike Lucia di Lammermoor, another opera with a Cammarano libretto, Malvina has no real connection to Scottish culture.

The lead tenor quit before the opening, and the opera had to be hastily rewritten for an unconventional cast of soprano, coloratura contralto, baritone and bass. Even with these challenges, Pacini created an opera so beautiful that a throng of admirers escorted the veteran composer home by torchlight after the premiere. Described at the premiere as “a wealth of harmony and melody…imagined and felt by a great master” the opera played to full houses for two months. But without a lead tenor part, and with Pacini’s star on the wane, it was revived only twice and vanished from the repertoire after 1862. It has not been heard in over 150 years.

In Brooklyn, New York in 2016, Vertical Player Repertory commissioned music editor and conductor Hans Schellevis to create a new performing edition of this intriguing opera.

== Characters ==
Malvina, soprano - the ill-fated noblewoman who has borne two illegitimate children to Prince Arturo

Prince Arturo, high baritone - successful warrior who loves Malvina

King Malcolm, bass - Prince Arturo's father, King of Scotland

Princess Morna, coloratura mezzo-soprano - Irish princess betrothed to Prince Arturo

Wortimer, character tenor - The King’s advisor Wortimer, spurned by Malvina

Edwige, soprano - Lady-in-waiting to Malvina

Rodwaldo, tenor - Captain of the King’s guard

== Plot ==
Act I:

Arturo comes back from war and the King announces he is betrothed to Morna. Arturo visits his beloved Malvina, with whom he has had two illegitimate children. Wortimer plots his revenge after being rejected by Malvina. After Arturo and Malvina get married in secret, Wortimer kidnaps the children and brings them to the king.

Malvina arrives at the palace begging the King to spare her children. Arturo admits he has married Malvina and the children belong to him. Morna and the King are outraged and Malvina is imprisoned.

Act II:

Morna visits Malvina in prison, later joined by the King where they both forgive her and the King accepts the children as his heirs.

Act III:

All is well in the palace until Wortimer murders the children in their sleep and flees. The King is distraught and Arturo copes with his death.

Malvina is found wandering through a graveyard, having lost her senses. Arturo brings in the captured Wortimer, who admits having poisoned Malvina. Malvina dies and Arturo kills Wortimer.

The plot is unusual for the fact that the two women have a whole scene together and instead of a villain, Morna proves to be compassionate and just. Arturo has an extended scene solely dealing with his feelings of grief. The ensembles are unusually colorful because of two sopranos and a tenor, the top voices are soprano, mezzo, and baritone.
