= Il convitato di pietra (Pacini) =

Il convitato di pietra is an 1832 opera by Pacini originally written for private performance by the composer's own family and friends. The libretto by Gaetano Barbieri, librettist of Il Talismano, was compiled from earlier librettos telling the story of Mozart's Don Giovanni, including Bertati's for Gazzaniga, but with changes including the removal of the role of Elvira.

== Original cast ==
Role	Voice	Interpreter
Don Giovanni	tenor	Francesco Pacini
Donna Anna	contralto	Signora Rosa
Zerlina	soprano	Claudia Pacini
Masetto; Il Commendatore	basso	Giovanni Billet
Duca Ottavio	tenor	Domenico Tonelli
Ficcanaso	basso	Luigi Pacini

== Recording ==
- Il convitato di pietra: Don Giovanni - Leonardo Cortellazzi (tenor); Donna Anna - Geraldine Chauvet (mezzo); Zerlina - Zinovia Maria Zafeiriadou (soprano); Masetto - Ugo Guagliardo (bass); Duca Ottavio - Giorgio Trucco (tenor); Il Commendatore - Ugo Guagliardo (Bass); Ficcanaso - Giulio Mastrototaro (baritone) Transylvania State Philharmonic Choir, Cluj Südwestdeutsches Kammerorchester Pforzheim, Daniele Ferrari 1–2, 4 July; 4 July 2008; Jubilee 20th Rossini in Wildbad Festival
