= Jennifer Larmore =

American opera singer (born 1958)

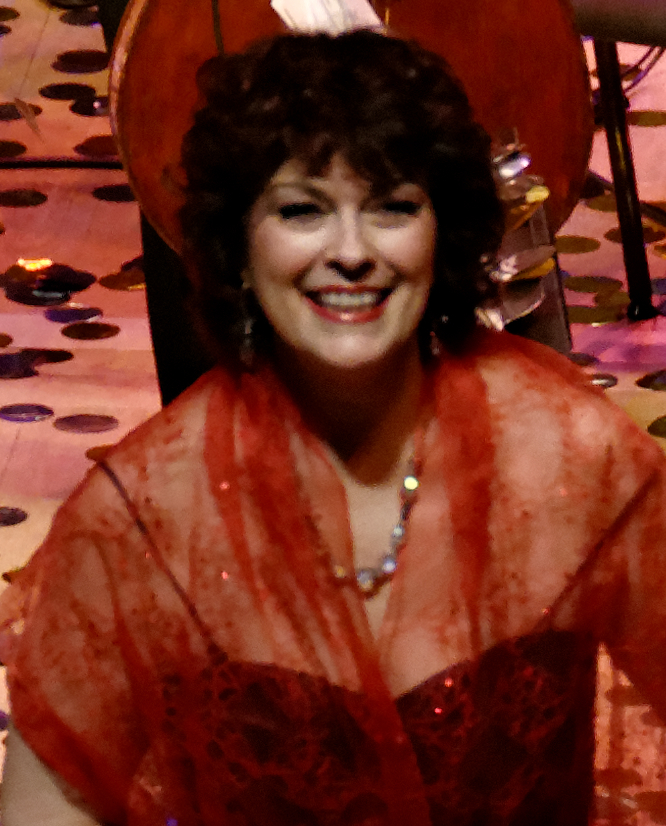
- Larmore in 2013
- Born: June 21, 1958 (age 68); Atlanta, Georgia, U.S.
- Occupation: Opera singer
- Years active: 1986–present
- Website: http://www.jenniferlarmore.info/

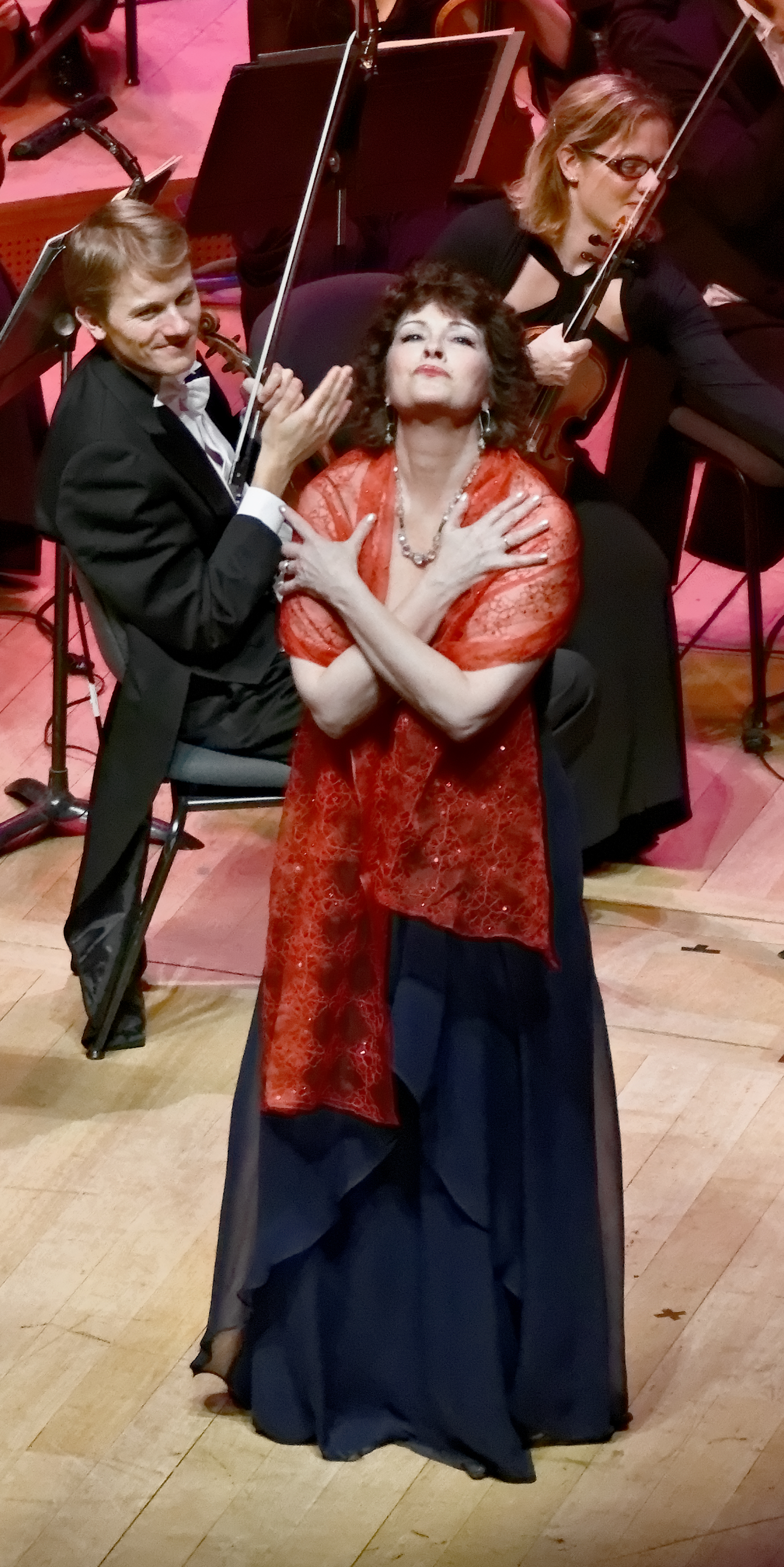
Jennifer Larmore at the End of Year Concert at the Auditorium Maurice-Ravel, Lyon, France, in 2013

Jennifer Larmore (born June 21, 1958) is an American mezzo-soprano opera singer, particularly noted for her performances in coloratura and bel canto roles which she has performed in the world's major opera houses. She was a professor at the Music College of Seoul National University from March 2021 to March 2024.In 2025 she sings “The Countess” in Pique Dame of Tchaikovsky at Teatro Reggio, Torino and at Berlin Deutsche Oper.

== Life and career ==
Larmore was born in Atlanta, Georgia. She attended Westminster Choir College in New Jersey and trained with Robert McIver, John Bullock and Regina Resnik. In 1982, she attended the Music Academy of the West summer conservatory program. She made her professional debut in 1986, at Opéra de Nice in Mozart's La clemenza di Tito. In 1988, she sang Rosina in Rossini's Il barbiere di Siviglia (Jérôme Savary production in Strasbourg). She made her Carnegie Hall debut as Romeo (Bellini's I Capuleti e i Montecchi) in 1994 and her Metropolitan Opera debut as Rosina in Il barbiere di Siviglia in 1995. She went on to sing at the Met in La Cenerentola (Angelina), Hansel and Gretel (Hansel), Les Contes d'Hoffmann (Giulietta), Giulio Cesare (title role), L'italiana in Algeri (Isabella), Die Fledermaus (Prince Orlofsky), the world premiere of Tobias Picker's An American Tragedy (Elizabeth Griffiths), and Hamlet (Gertrude).

In 2012, Larmore began adding dramatic soprano roles to her repertoire, singing Lady Macbeth in Verdi's Macbeth at the Grand Théâtre de Genève and Kostelnicka in Janáček's Jenufa at the Deutsche Oper Berlin. In 2013, she reprised the role Lady Macbeth for the celebrations of Verdi's bicentenary at the Teatro Comunale di Bologna and in Reggio Emilia. In 2013 she also starred in the world premiere of The Fall of Fukuyama, a new opera by Gregoire Hetzel and Camille de Toledo.

Larmore has won the 1994 Richard Tucker Award, a 1992 Gramophone award for Giulio Cesare on Harmonia Mundi in which she sang the title role, and the 2007 Grammy Award for Best Opera Recording for Hansel and Gretel. She sang at the 1996 Summer Olympics closing ceremony in Atlanta and hosted a satellite radio show for two years called Backstage with Jennifer Larmore. Also in 1996 she performed during a tribute to Gene Roddenberry on the live TV special Star Trek 30 Years and Beyond. She received the Chevalier de l'Ordre des Arts et des Lettres from the French Government in 2002. Her first book Una Voce -The Drama in Opera Onstage and Off was written to help singers make sense of life as freelance artists.

== Recordings ==
In addition to Rosina in Il barbiere di Siviglia, Larmore has recorded leading roles in Carmen, Elisabetta, regina d'Inghilterra, La Cenerentola, L'italiana in Algeri, Bianca e Falliero, Giulio Cesare, La Sofonisba, Orphée et Eurydice, Zanetto, Hansel and Gretel, and I Capuleti e i Montecchi.

She has also appeared in supporting roles in l'Incoronazione di Poppea, Maria Stuarda, Francesca di Foix, Elvida, Adelaide di Borgogna, Il Signor Bruschino, Semiramide, Rigoletto, Carlo di Borgogna, Alessandro nelle Indie and Offenbach's Vert-Vert.

Larmore appears as the mezzo-soprano soloist in recordings of Duruflé's Requiem, Mozart's Great Mass in C minor, Gurre-Lieder, El Amor Brujo, and El sombrero de tres picos.

Her solo CDs are Where Shall I Fly, Born in Atlanta, Jennifer Larmore, A Portrait, Call Me Mister, Amore per Rossini, Rossini Songs, Royal Mezzo, Jennifer Larmore, Great Operatic Arias, Bravura Diva, and My Native Land.

She appears on several DVDs, including Il barbiere di Siviglia (Netherlands Opera), L'italiana in Algeri (Paris Opera), Lulu (Royal Opera House) and Jennifer Larmore in Recital (recorded live at the Performing Arts Center, Purchase College, New York).

== Discography ==
- The Faces of Love - The Songs of Jake Heggie, RCA, 1999
