= Die sizilianische Vesper =

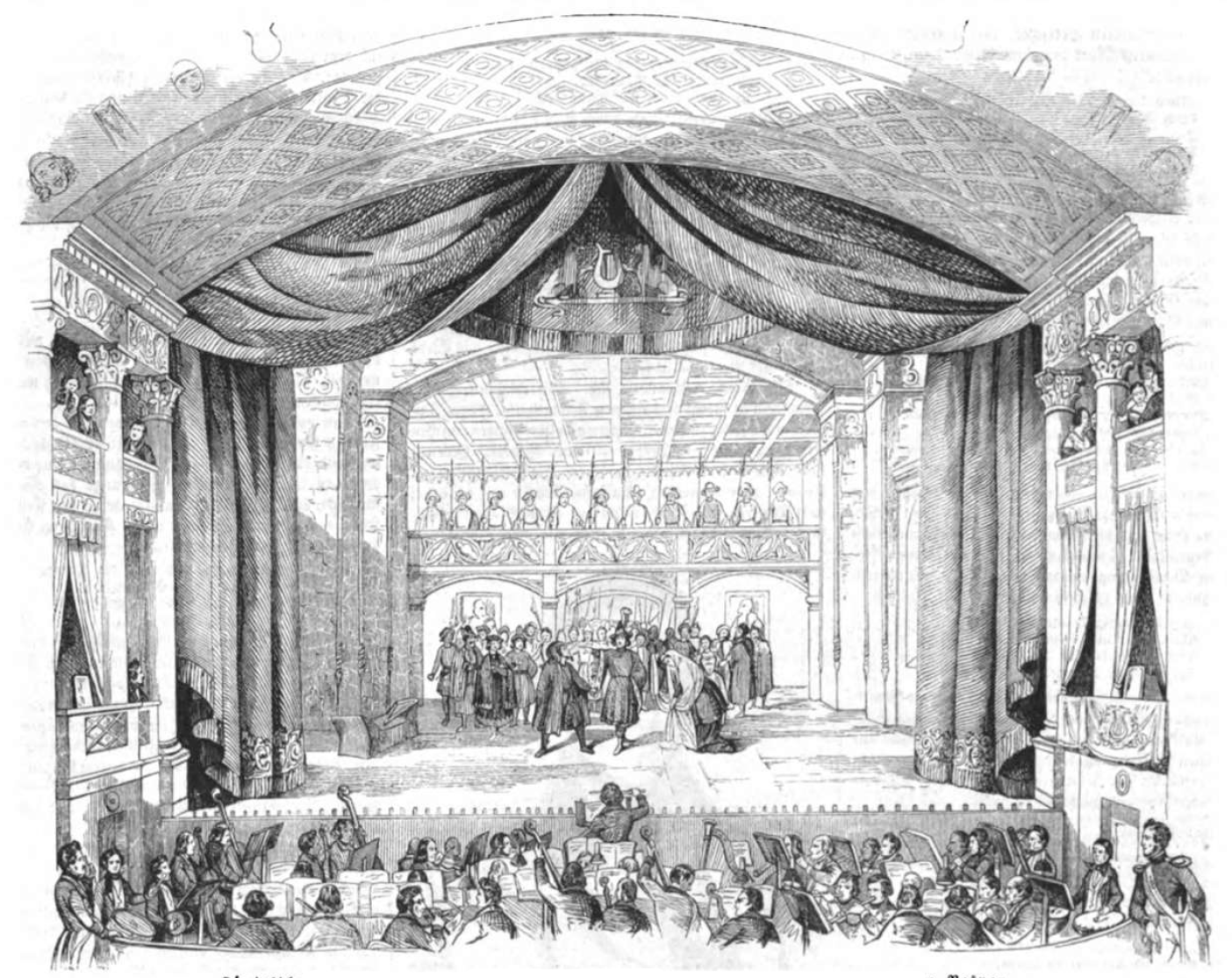

Die sizilianische Vesper is an 1843 opera by Peter Josef von Lindpaintner premiered in Stuttgart.

== Recording ==
- Il Vespro siciliano, Silvia Dalla Benetta, Ana Victoria Pitts, Danilo Formaggia, Cesar Arrieta, Camerata Bach Choir Poznan, Virtuosi Brunensis, Federico Longo, 4 CDs Naxos 2017
