= Caterina Canzi =

Austrian opera singer

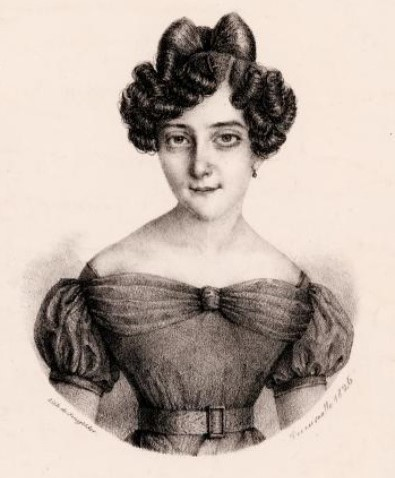
- Caterina Canzi in 1826
- Born: Katharina Kanz; 1805; Baden, Austria
- Died: 22 July 1890 (aged 85); Stuttgart, Germany
- Other names: Katharina Wallbach-Canzi
- Occupation: Opera singer (soprano)
- Years active: 1821–1842

Caterina Canzi, also known as Katharina Wallbach-Canzi, (1805 – 22 July 1890) was an Austrian-born soprano who sang leading roles in the opera houses of Europe, primarily in Italy and Germany. Amongst the roles she created were Isolde in Lindpaintner's Der Vampyr and the title role in Mercadante's Nitocri.

== Life and career ==
Born Katharina Kanz in Baden, Austria, Canzi was orphaned at a young age and raised in the family of her uncle, Baron von Zinnicq, an army officer who also ran a private theatre in Baden. She studied under Antonio Salieri in Vienna and made her stage debut there in 1821. After further studies at the Milan Conservatory with Davide Banderali, she appeared in the title role of Rossini's Zelmira at the Teatro Riccardi in Bergamo in 1823 and that same year made her debut at La Scala as Rosina in Il barbiere di Siviglia. The Italian correspondent for The Quarterly Musical Magazine and Review wrote of her La Scala debut that "her singing is very pleasing; her execution neat, and her ornaments graceful" and noted that she had also sung with success in Rossini's Ricciardo e Zoraide and L'inganno felice. She continued to sing in various theatres in Italy through 1825 as Catarina Canzi (the Italianized version of her name), appearing in Turin, Trieste, Florence, Vicenza, Parma and Bologna.

When Canzi had triumphed in the title role of Mercadante's Didone abbandonata at Vicenza, a poem in her honour was published in Teatri, arti e letturatura. The anonymous poet described her voice as inebriating him with its "pure voluptuousness" and proclaimed that had Dido sung like Canzi, Aeneas would never have abandoned her. Her appearances in Bologna in 1824 were likewise highly successful. She was made an honorary member of the Accademia Filarmonica di Bologna, and after a performance at the Teatro Comunale, her admirers tossed a laurel wreath at her feet to which yet another poem was attached. It was later published in full in The Harmonicon:

But to the gifts of voice the powers divine
Have joined the winning charm of form and face;
Resolv'd a two-fold conquest should be thine,
By song to charm us, and subdue by grace.
Unlike the transient charmers of the day
Thy memory shall not lightly pass away,
Nor from our mind thy form and talent part:
When long, long years have fled, in memory's ear
Thy tones of melting sweetness shall we hear,
Thy voice persuasive, speaking to the heart.

Canzi sang in concerts in London during the 1826 season and in a series of Rossini operas in Paris in 1828. However, from 1825 to 1842 she primarily sang in Leipzig and then in Stuttgart where she was held the title of Kammersängerin. After her marriage in 1830 to the German actor Ludwig Wallbach (1793–1872), she appeared under the name Katharina Wallbach-Canzi. Their son, Ludwig Wilhelm August Wallbach (1832–1914), became a singer and composer of art songs. Caterina Canzi died in Stuttgart at the age of 85.

== Roles created ==
- Emirena in Vittorio Trento's Giulio Sabino nel suo castello di Langres (Teatro Comunale, Bologna, 1 May 1824)
- Nitocri in Saverio Mercadante's Nitocri (Teatro Regio, Turin, 26 December 1824)
- Zelinda in Giuseppe Nicolini's Teuzzone (Teatro Regio, Turin, 22 January 1825)
- Eucàrite in Giuseppe Nicolini's L'arrivo (Teatro Ducale, Parma, July 1825)
- Isolde in Lindpaintner's Der Vampyr (Königliches Hoftheater, Stuttgart, 21 September 1828)
