= Peter Josef von Lindpaintner =

German composer (1791–1856)

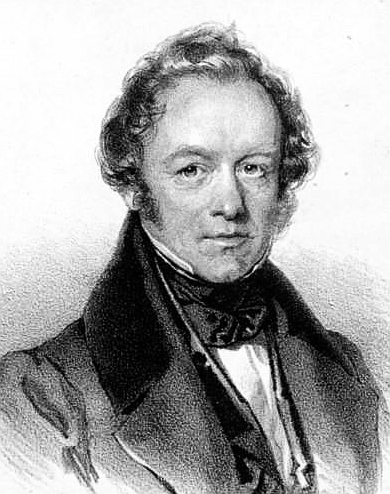
- Lindpaintner, portrait by Josef Kriehuber
- Born: 8 December 1791; Koblenz
- Died: 21 August 1856 (aged 64); Nonnenhorn, Bavaria
- Occupations: Composer; Conductor

Peter Josef von Lindpaintner (8 December 1791 – 21 August 1856) was a German composer and conductor.

Born in Koblenz as the son of a tenor, he studied with Peter Winter and Joseph Graetz. From 1819 onwards he was based in Stuttgart. Some of his early operas were Singspiele, but under the influence of Carl Maria von Weber his interest shifted to Romantic opera.

He died in Nonnenhorn, Bavaria, on Lake Constance.

== Works ==
=== Operas ===
Opus	Title	Genre	Subdivisions	Libretto	Premiere date	Place, theatre
20	Demophoon	opera seria	3 acts	Ignaz Franz Castelli	29 January 1811	Munich
94	Der blinde Gärtner, oder Die blühende Aloë	Singspiel	1 act	August von Kotzebue	10 July 1813 or 21 November 1815	Munich, Isartortheater
143	Die Pflegekinder	Singspiel	2 acts	Karl Thienemann	1812 or 19 November 1814	Munich, Isartortheater
148	Die Prinzessin von Cacambo	komische Oper	3 acts	August von Kotzebue	1814 or 2 March 1815	Munich, Isartortheater
151	Die Sternkönigin or: Das Sternenmädchen	romantisch-komisches Volksmärchen	2 acts	J. A. Voß	13 July or September 1815	Munich, Isartortheater
162	Das Christusbild, oder Kunstsinn und Liebe	Singspiel	2 acts		May/June 1816	Stuttgart?
163	Hans Max Giesbrecht von der Humpenburg oder Die neue Ritterzeit	Singspiel	1 act	August von Kotzebue	May or 6 June 1816	Munich, Isartortheater
168	Pervonte, oder Die Wünsche	komisches Oper	3 acts	Lindpaintner, after a tale by Christoph Martin Wieland	June or 14 August 1816	Munich, Isartortheater
203	Die Rosenmädchen	Singspiel	3 acts	Lindpaintner and August von Kotzebue, after Emmanuel Théaulon	3 June 1818	Vienna, Theater an der Wien
225	Timantes (revision of Demophoon)	große heroische Oper	3 acts	Franz Xaver Hiemer	22 January 1820	Stuttgart, Hof
231	Sulmona	Oper	3 acts	Lindpaintner and Hiemer, after Christoph Friedrich Bretzner	11 April 1823	Stuttgart, Hof
235	Der Bergkönig	romantische Oper	3 acts	Karl Hanisch	30 January 1825	Stuttgart, Hof
260	Der Vampyr	romantische Oper	3 acts	Cäsar Max Heigel	21 September 1828	Stuttgart, Hof
268	Die Amazone, oder Der Frauen und der Liebe Sieg	Oper	3 acts	Ludwig Robert	28 September 1831	Stuttgart, Hof
275	Die Bürgschaft	große Oper	3 acts	Friedrich Ludwig Carl Biedenfeld, after Friedrich Schiller's poem "Die Bürgschaft"	28 September 1834	Stuttgart, Hof
284	Die Macht des Liedes	komische Oper	3 acts	Ignaz Franz Castelli	13 March 1836	Stuttgart, Hof
295	Die Genueserin	große romantische Oper	2 acts	Carl Philipp Berger	8 February 1839	Vienna, Theater am Kärntnertor
332	Die sizilianische Vesper	große romantische Oper	4 acts	Heribert Rau	6 or 10 May 1843	Stuttgart
364	Lichtenstein	große Oper	5 acts	Franz Dingelstedt, after Wilhelm Hauff's novel Lichtenstein	26 August 1846	Stuttgart
446	Giulia, oder die Corsen	Oper	4 acts	August Lewald	20 November 1853	Stuttgart
481	Libella	Oper	2 acts		composed in 1855, but unperformed	

== Bibliography ==
- R. Hänsler: Peter Lindpaintner als Opernkomponist (diss., Munich, 1928)
- R. Nägele: Peter Joseph von Lindpaintner: sein Leben, sein Werk (Tutzing, 1993)
- R. Nägele: Peter von Lindpaintner – Briefe (letters, 1809–1856) (Göttingen, 2001)
