= Luigi Pacini =

Italian opera singer

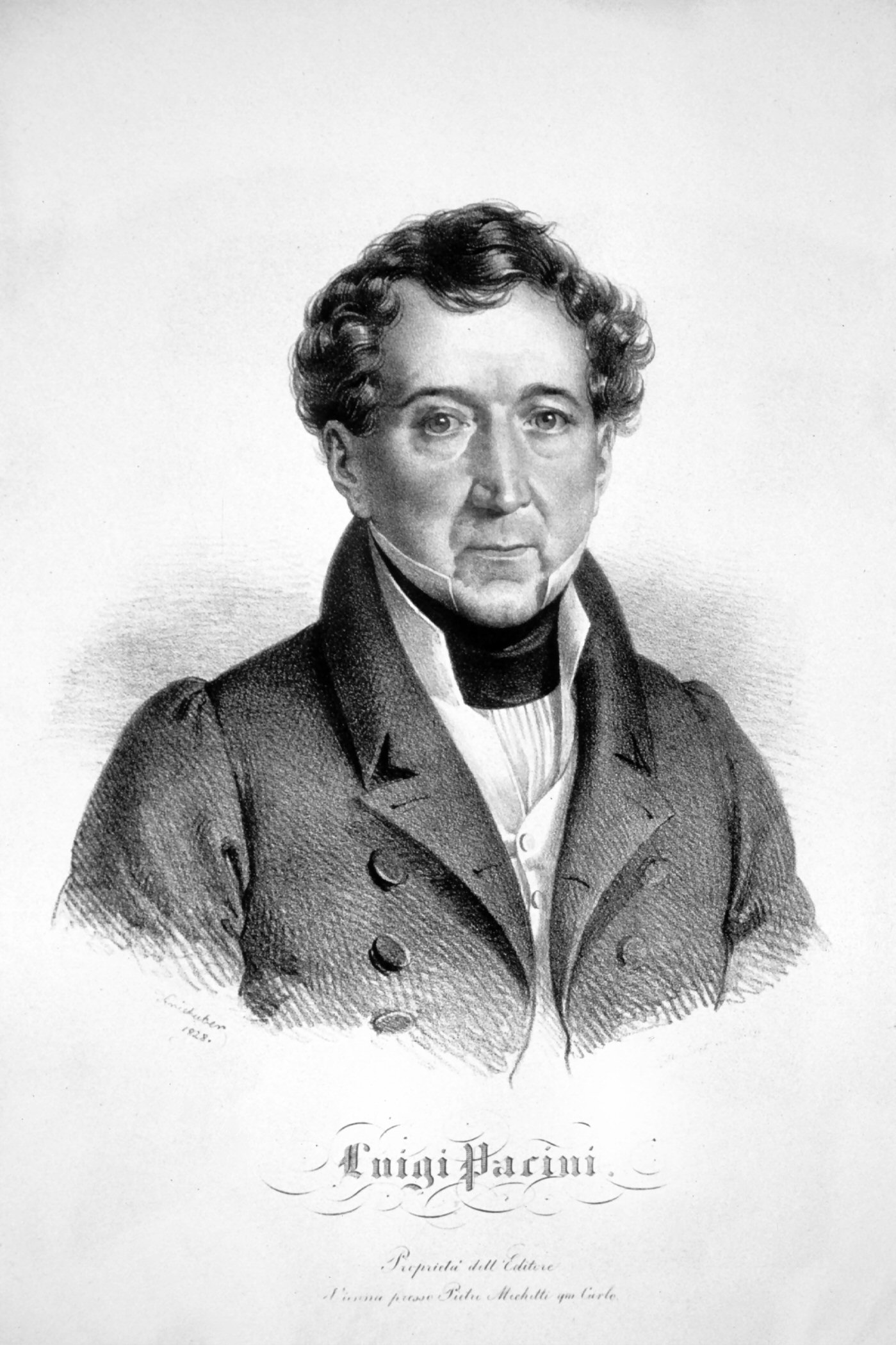
- Born: 25 March 1767; Popiglio di Piteglio, Italy
- Died: 2 May 1837 (aged 70); Viareggio, Italy
- Occupation: Opera singer (bass)
- Relatives: Giovanni Pacini (son); Regina Pacini (great-granddaughter)

Luigi Pacini (25 March 1767 – 2 May 1837) was an Italian opera singer who appeared on the principal stages of his native country as well as in Spain and Austria in a career that spanned over 30 years. He began his career as a tenor but in 1805 started singing bass roles and rose to prominence in that repertoire. Amongst the numerous roles he created in world premieres were Geronio in Rossini's Il turco in Italia and Parmenione in his L'occasione fa il ladro. Pacini was born in the Province of Pistoia and died in Viareggio where in his later years he taught singing at the conservatory founded by his son, Giovanni Pacini.

== Life and career ==
Pacini was born in Popiglio di Piteglio, a hamlet in the hills outside Pistoia in Tuscany. He appears to have spent his childhood in Rome and showed an early aptitude for music. The Duke of Sermoneta became the young Pacini's patron and arranged for him to study music, first in Rome with Giovanni Masi, the maestro di cappella of San Giacomo degli Spagnoli and then in Naples at the Conservatorio della Pietà dei Turchini under Giacomo Tritto.

Pacini left the Naples conservatory where he was studying singing and composition before he had completed the course and began singing tenor roles in various opera houses in Italy. He is also recorded as playing the contrabass in the orchestra of the Teatro di Santa Maria in Florence during the 1788 season. By 1795, Pacini had married the soprano Isabella Paulillo who came from Gaeta. He was performing in Catania when she gave birth to their son Giovanni on 17 February 1796. The family moved to Spain in 1798 where Pacini was engaged as the leading tenor in the Italian opera company of the Teatre de la Santa Creu in Barcelona. He sang the role of Ferrando in the first Barcelona performance of Mozart's Così fan tutte in the 1798–1799 season and remained with company for three years. His wife also sang with the company in comprimario roles.

On his return to Italy in 1801 and through 1804, Pacini sang regularly at Milan's La Scala and Turin's Teatro Regio in leading tenor roles. When an engagement to sing in Livorno during the Carnival season of 1805 was cancelled because of an outbreak of yellow fever, Pacini's friends encouraged him to take over the title role of Orlandi's Bietolino Fiorone which was to premiere during the 1805 Carnival season at the Teatro Carcano in Milan. It was the first time that he sang a basso buffo role, and he had an immediate success. From that point until his retirement from the stage, he sang exclusively in the basso buffo repertoire.

Pacini created the Rossinian basso buffo roles of Parmenione in L'occasione fa il ladro (1812) and Geronio Il turco in Italia (1814) and was also greatly admired by Rossini as Taddeo in L'italiana in Algeri which he sang in the opera's first performance at La Scala in 1815. Between 1816 and 1832 he also created twelve roles in operas composed by his son Giovanni, including Mustafà in La schiava in Bagdad and Ficcanaso in Il convitato di pietra. Pacini continued his stage career through the late 1820s. He sang in Vienna in the 1827 opera season which had been organized by Domenico Barbaia and in 1828 sang again at La Scala as Koli in the world premiere of Carlo Coccia's L'orfano della selva with a cast that also included Carolina Ungher and Luigi Lablache.

In 1822 Giovanni Pacini had settled in Viareggio in a large villa where his parents, Luigi and Isabella, and two of his siblings, Claudia and Francesco, lived with him. When Giovanni established his own music school in the city in 1835, Luigi became one of its singing masters. It was not his first experience as a teacher. In 1809 he had been appointed singing master to Eugène de Beauharnais and his family. Luigi Pacini died in Viareggio on 2 May 1837 at the age of 70.

== Family and descendants ==
Luigi and Isabella Pacini had four children. The eldest was the composer Giovanni born in 1796. He was followed by Giuseppina who was born during their sojourn in Spain, then Francesco and Claudia. Giovanni was married three times and had nine children. Only five of them were still alive in 1865 when he wrote his memoirs. His sole surviving son, Luigi, was born in 1851 from his third marriage to the Tuscan noblewoman Marianna Scoti (1825–1911).

Giuseppina married a wealthy but at times profligate Roman named Gaetano Giorgi. Their son, who performed as Pietro Andrea Giorgi Pacini, was a noted baritone and the impresario of Lisbon's Teatro de São Carlos for many years. Pietro's daughter was the soprano Regina Pacini who later married Marcelo de Alvear, the President of Argentina from 1922 to 1928.

Claudia married Antonio Belluomini in 1823. The Belluomini were a prominent family in Viagreggio whose members included Giuseppe Belluomini (1776–1854), the personal physician of the singer Maria Malibran and Giacomo Belluomini (1789–1869), a close friend of Pauline Bonaparte. (Note: Giacomo Belluomini supervised the construction of Pauline Bonaparte's summer villa in Viagreggio and acted as her agent and confidante. She had chosen the location to be near Giovanni Pacini who was her lover at the time.) For a time, Francesco Pacini served as the French consul in Viareggio. Both Claudia and Francesco were gifted amateur singers and sang in the first performance of Giovanni Pacini's Il convitato di pietra along with their father and Francesco's wife, Rosa. The performance was held in the Palazzo Belluomini which contained a small private theatre.
