= Fedra (Mayr) =

Opera by Simon Mayr

Fedra is an opera (melodramma serio) in two acts composed by Simon Mayr to an Italian-language libretto by Luigi Romanelli based on Racine's play Phèdre.

It premiered on 26 December 1820 at La Scala in Milan with Teresa Belloc-Giorgi in the title role. The German premiere of the opera took place at the Staatstheater Braunschweig on 30 March 2008, 188 years after its first performance.

== Recordings ==
| Year | Cast | Conductor, Opera house and orchestra | Label |
|---|---|---|---|
| 2008 | Capucine Chiaudani, Tomasz Zagorski, Rebecca Nelsen, Dae-Bum Lee, Hyo-Jin Shin, Jorn Lindemann | Gerd Schaller, Chorus of the Staatstheater Braunschweig, Staatsorchester Braunschweig | CD: Oehms Classics; OC 920 |
