= Elisa e Claudio =

Saverio Mercadante

Elisa e Claudio, ossia L'amore protetto dall'amicizia (Elisa and Claudio, or Love Protected by Friendship) is a two-act melodramma semiseria by the 19th century Italian composer Saverio Mercadante from a libretto by Luigi Romanelli based on the play, Rosella by Filipo Casari. It received its premiere performance at La Scala in Milan on 30 October 1821.

Mercadante began to compose operas in 1819, and Elisa was his seventh. It "was his first great success, and his only comedy to maintain its place alongside the serious works of his later years.

== Performance history ==
Initially successful, the opera was presented at His Majesty's Theatre in London in April 1823, followed a month later at the then-named Théâtre royal italien in Paris on 22 November. The US premiere occurred on 18 October 1832 in New York City.

Elisa is the only Mercadante comic opera to have been presented in recent years. In fact, very few revivals of any of the composer's operas have taken place in the 20th century, but those of Elisa e Claudio include a 1971 presentation at the Teatro San Carlo in Naples and 1973 performances at the occasional "Festival Mercadantiano" in the composer's home town, Altamura in Southern Italy, in which Salvatore Fisichella sang the role of Claudio. The Wexford Festival in Ireland was instrumental in featuring Mercadante's work, and Elisa and Claudio was presented there in October 1988.

== Roles ==
Role	Voice type	Premiere Cast (Conductor: Alessandro Rolla)
Elisa	mezzo-soprano	Teresa Belloc-Giorgi
Claudio, son of Conte Arnoldo	tenor	Domenico Donzelli
Carlotta, Elisa's friend	soprano	Margherita Schira
Il Conte Arnoldo	bass	Luigi Lablache
Il Marchese Tricotazio	baritone	Nicola De Grecis
Silvia, his daughter	mezzo-soprano	Carolina Sivelli
Celso, his servant, an old friend of Claudio	tenor	Pietro Gentili
Luca, Conte Arnoldo's chief servant	tenor	Carlo Salvatore Poggiali
the two children of Elisa and Claudio	silent	
Servants, Ruffians, Garden-girls

== Synopsis ==
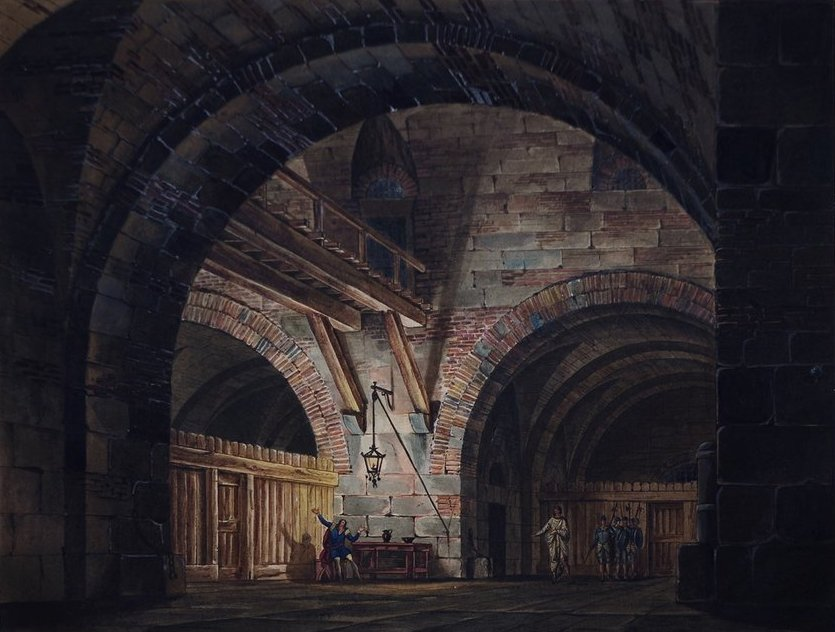
Set design by Alessandro Sanquirico for the first performance of Elisa e Claudio at La Scala in Milan, 1821

Place: Tuscany
Time: early nineteenth century

=== Act 1 ===
Scene 1: Inside Count Arnoldo's villa

The Marquis Tricotazio and his daughter Silvia have arrived to visit the Count a day earlier than expected. The Marquis is looking forward to Silvia's marriage with the Count's son Claudio, but Silvia is in love with Celso, a former fellow-student of Claudio who has joined the Marquis's retinue. The Count suspects that Claudio wishes to marry someone else, and has confined him to his room for a year, but Claudio, to the Count's surprise, agrees to the marriage. This is a ruse which allows him to move more freely and, in particular, to visit Elisa, whom he has secretly married. However, the Count's servant, Luca, has discovered the existence of Elisa and the two children that she has borne to Claudio.

Scene 2: Carlotta's cottage

Elisa and the children are staying with her friend Carlotta. She is longing to be reunited with Claudio. Carlotta arrives, indignant that Claudio is apparently to marry Silvia. Claudio appears and is reproached by the women, but he convinces them that his consent to the marriage is a pretence. After he has left, Luca and a gang of ruffians arrive and carry off the children, to the great distress of Elisa and Carlotta.

Scene 3: The gallery in the Count's villa

Silvia and Celso plan to elope, but suddenly Claudio and Carlotta arrive with the news that the children have been kidnapped. The Marquis appears, but gets angry when no-one tells him what is going on. The arrival of Luca and the servants does not improve his temper.

Scene 4: The Count's garden

The bewildered Marquis is taking the air when he is confronted by a furious Elisa, who accuses him of ordering the kidnapping. He has no idea who she is or what she is talking about, and, assuming her to be mad, rushes off, pursued by Elisa. Carlotta arrives, distressed because she has been unable to find Elisa, but the servants cannot help.

Scene 5: Inside the villa

Luca and the Count are discussing what to do with the children when the Marquis, still pursued by Elisa, arrives. Silvia, Claudio, Carlotta and Celso now appear, and when the Count orders the servants to throw Elisa out, she realises that he, and not the Marquis, is her enemy. The others plead with the Count, but he is adamant.

=== Act 2 ===
Scene 1: The Count's garden

Luca refuses to tell the servants exactly what is going on and sends them away. The Count reveals that he plans to offer Elisa a dowry if she finds someone to marry. The Marquis tries to persuade the Count to abandon the marriage of Silvia and Claudio, but the Count will not listen. Celso tells Silvia and Carlotta that he has acquired a key to a secret door through which Elisa and Claudio can escape. He has also had an idea about how to find where the children are being kept. Carlotta reflects that love has its sorrows as well as its enchantments.

Scene 2: Inside the villa

The Count tries to persuade Elisa to accept the dowry and the husband that he has selected for her. She rejects both. Celso, who had put his own name forward to the Count, offers Luca a share of the dowry if he will reveal the children's whereabouts. Luca has no hesitation in accepting.

Scene 3: Night-time in the garden

Elisa, Claudio and Carlotta have escaped through the secret door. They encounter the Marquis and then the Count, who has Luca's armed ruffians with him. The Count and Claudio shout at each other until he gives the order for Elisa to be taken away and locked up. After a scene of general confusion, Claudio meets Celso, who has freed the two children, and they hymn the power of friendship.

Scene 4: A room in the villa

Elisa is visited in her prison by Claudio and the children, and is overjoyed at their reunion. Celso, Carlotta and the Marquis join the rejoicing. The Count, still furious, is not impressed by Elisa's pleading with him, nor with the Marquis's support for her. The Marquis is disconcerted to find that Silvia is in love with Celso, a servant, but recovers and agrees to their union. Elisa offers to renounce her claim to Claudio if the Count will forgive his son, and finally the Count gives way and accepts their marriage, to general rejoicing.

== Recordings ==
Year	Cast (Elisa, Claudio, Carlotta, Il Conte Arnoldo)	Conductor, Opera House and Orchestra	Label
1971	Virginia Zeani, Agostino Lazzari, Giovanna Fioroni, Ugo Trama	Ugo Rápalo; Teatro San Carlo, Naples Orchestra and Chorus (Recording of a performance at Naples, 31 January)	Audio CD: Melodram; Cat: CDM 27099
1988	Lena Nordin, János Bándi, Alice Baker, Plamen Hidjov	Marco Guidarini, Orchestra of Raidió Teilifís Éireann and Wexford Festival Opera Chorus (Recorded at performances at the Wexford Festival, October)	Audio CD: Premiere Opera (Italy); Cat: unnumbered
