= Elvida =

Opera by Gaetano Donizetti

- Opera by Gaetano Donizetti
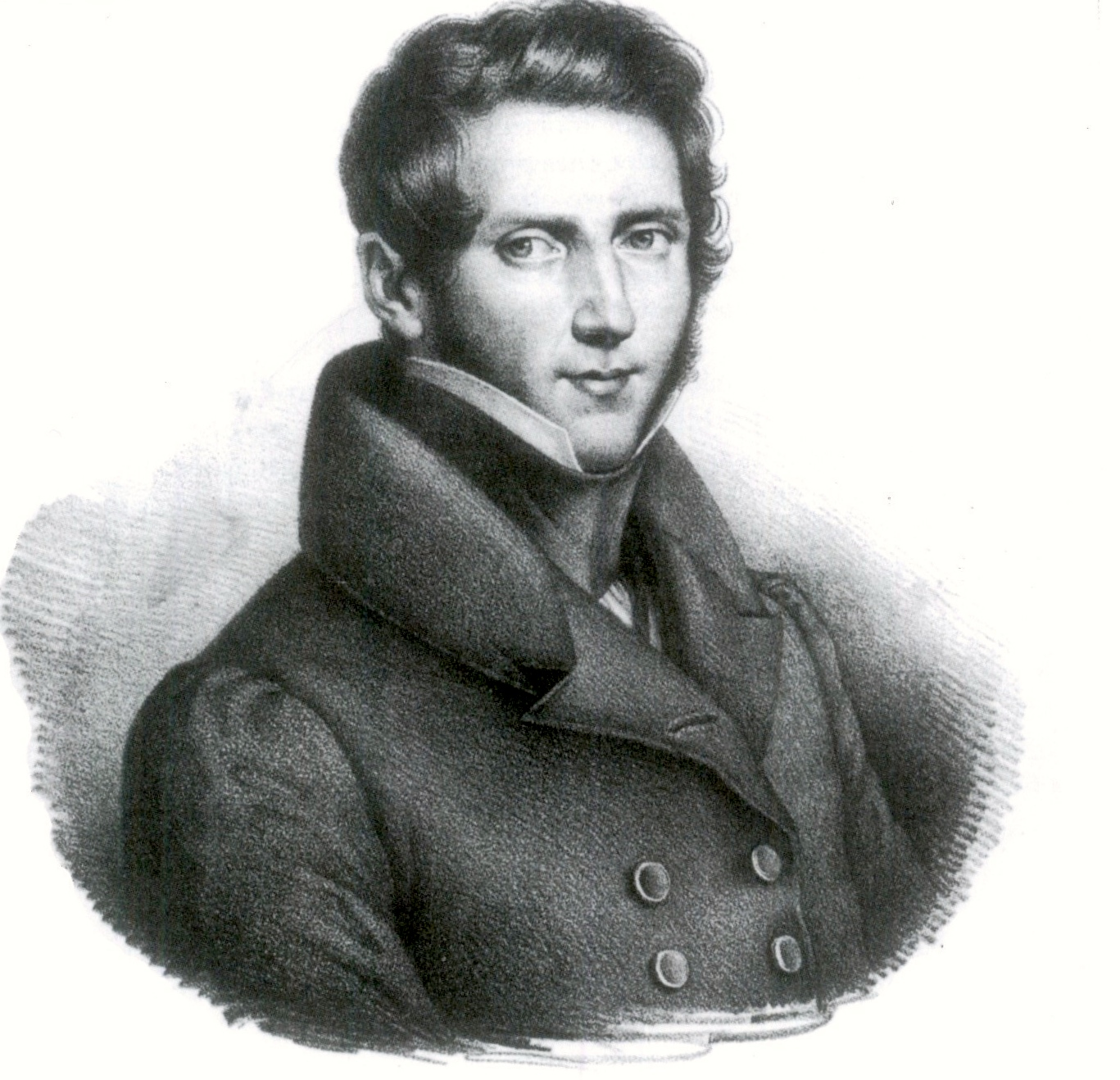
- The young composer
- Librettist: Giovanni Schmidt
- Language: Italian
- Premiere: 6 July 1826; Teatro San Carlo, Naples

Elvida is a melodramma or opera in one act by Gaetano Donizetti. Giovanni Schmidt wrote the Italian libretto. The opera was written as a pièce d'occasion for the birthday of Queen Maria of the Two Sicilies. The choice of subject matter was no doubt intended as an elegant acknowledgement of the Queen's Spanish ancestry. Donizetti received little financial reward for the work and, as a result, put the minimum of effort into its composition.

Elvida was first performed on 6 July 1826 at the Teatro San Carlo in Naples, but it "made little impression on the audience" After three performances, the piece lay forgotten until its performances and recordings in 2004.

== Roles ==
Role	Voice type	Premiere cast, 6 July 1826 (Conductor: –)
Elvida, a Castilian noblewoman	soprano	Henriette Méric-Lalande
Alfonso, a Castilian prince	tenor	Giovanni Battista Rubini
Amur, a Moorish chieftain	bass	Luigi Lablache
Zeidar, Amur's son	contralto	Brigida Lorenzani
Chorus: Spaniards, Moors, and soldiers

== Synopsis ==
Place: A fortified town in the Emirate of Granada.
Time: The late fifteenth century.

=== Scene 1 ===
During the struggle for control of southern Spain, Elvida, a noble Castilian lady, has been captured by the Moors. For two months she has been held prisoner by Amur in one of the last remaining Moorish strongholds. However, Spanish troops led by Elvida’s fiancé, Alfonso, are now advancing on the town.

Amur wants to have Elvida put to death, rather than allow her to be saved by Alfonso’s troops. However, Amur’s son, Zeidar, has fallen in love with their beautiful captive and begs his father to give her up to the approaching Spanish, if only to save the town from destruction. Zeidar pleads with Elvida to marry him, but she contemptuously rejects both his advances and his father’s threats. The Moors murdered her father, and Elvida longs for retribution. She is led away to a hidden dungeon.

The Castilian army is now at the gates of the town, Amur recognizes that further resistance is hopeless, but knowing that Moorish reinforcements are close at hand, he is determined to make his escape through a secret passage, taking Zeidar with him.

=== Scene 2 ===
Alfonso enters in triumph at the head of his troops. Although he is disappointed that Amur and Zeidar have apparently escaped, he is more concerned for the safety of Elvida. One of Amur’s slaves offers to lead him to the cavern where Elvida is being held captive.

=== Scene 3 ===
Amur intends to use Elvida as a hostage to aid his escape with Zeidar. The two men enter the cavern in which she is imprisoned and try to force her to come with them. Elvida is defiant, and before they can drag her away, Spanish troops burst in. Amur draws his dagger with the intention of killing Elvida, but Zeidar seizes his arm and the troops are able to overpower him.

Amur curses his son for his betrayal, and at that moment word arrives that the Moorish reinforcements have been routed. In a magnanimous gesture Alfonso grants Zeidar his freedom and agrees to spare Amur’s life. There is general rejoicing as Alfonso announces his marriage to Elvida will take place on the following morning.

== Recordings ==
Year	Cast (Amur, Zeidar, Elvida, Alfonso)	Conductor, Opera house and orchestra	Label
2004	Massimiliano Fichera, Maria Pia Moriyon, Cristina Pastorello, Daniele Gaspari	Franco Piva, Orcestra e Coro Città di Adria (Recording of a performance in the Teatro di Adria, October)	CD: Bongiovanni; Cat: 2370-3
2004	Pietro Spagnoli, Jennifer Larmore, Annick Massis, Bruce Ford	Antonello Allemandi, London Philharmonic Orchestra and Geoffrey Mitchell Choir	CD: Opera Rara; Cat: OR 29
