= Luigi Romanelli =

Italian opera librettist

Luigi Romanelli (July 21, 1751 – March 1, 1839) was an Italian opera librettist.

Romanelli was born in Rome.

He wrote tens of librettos, most of them for operas to be performed at La Scala in Milan. In the same city he was professor of declamation at the conservatory.

Among his most successful works, La pietra del paragone for Rossini, Elisa e Claudio for Mercadante, Fedra for Mayr and La vestale for Pacini

Romanelli died in Milan in 1839.

== Operas based on librettos by Romanelli ==
Title	Genre	Subdivisions	Music	Première	Place, theatre
Virginia	dramma serio per musica	3 acts	Angelo Tarchi	8 September 1785	Florence, Teatro della Pergola
Virginia	opera seria	3 acts	Joachim Albertini	7 January 1786	Rome, Teatro delle Dame
Il fabbro parigino o sia La schiava fortunata	dramma giocoso per musica	2 acts	Valentino Fioravanti	9 January 1789	Rome, Teatro Capranica
Il trionfo del bel sesso ossia La forza delle donne	opera buffa	2 acts	Giuseppe Nicolini	20 August 1799	Milan, Teatro alla Scala
Il ritratto	opera buffa	3 acts	Nicola Antonio Zingarelli	12 October 1799	Milan, Teatro alla Scala
I baccanali di Roma	opera seria	2 acts	Giuseppe Nicolini	21 January 1801	Milan, Teatro alla Scala
Il puntiglio (Furberia e puntiglio)	opera buffa	2 acts	Vincenzo Pucitta	7 July 1802	Milan, Teatro alla Scala
La fortunata combinazione	opera buffa	2 acts	Giuseppe Mosca	17 August 1802	Milan, Teatro alla Scala
La capricciosa pentita	dramma giocoso per musica	2 acts	Valentino Fioravanti	2 October 1802	Milan, Teatro alla Scala
La schiava di due padroni	opera buffa	2 acts	Valentino Fioravanti	15 March 1803	Milan, Teatro alla Scala
Chi vuol troppo veder diventa cieco (I mariti gelosi)	opera buffa	2 acts	Giuseppe Mosca	2 July 1803	Milan, Teatro alla Scala
Le finte rivali	melodramma giocoso	2 acts	Johann Simon Mayr	20 August 1803	Milan, Teatro alla Scala
L'impostore avvilito	opera		Vincenzo Lavigna	11 September 1804	Milan, Teatro alla Scala
Abenamet e Zoraide	dramma per musica	2 acts	Giuseppe Nicolini	26 December 1805	Milan, Teatro alla Scala
Coriolano	dramma per musica	2 acts	Vincenzo Lavigna	20 January 1806	Turin, Teatro Regio
Idomeneo	opera seria	2 acts	Vincenzo Federici	31 January 1806	Milan, Teatro alla Scala
Adelasia e Aleramo	melodramma serio	2 acts	Johann Simon Mayr	26 December 1806	Milan, Teatro alla Scala
Paolo Emilio	opera seria		Jannoni	2 February 1807	Milan, Teatro alla Scala
Cleopatra	opera	2 acts	Joseph Weigl	19 December 1807	Milan, Teatro alla Scala
La conquista del Messico	dramma per musica	2 acts	Ercole Paganini	4 February 1808	Milan, Teatro alla Scala
Il rivale di se stesso	melodramma	2 acts	Joseph Weigl	18 April 1808	Milan, Teatro alla Scala
Di posta in posta	opera		Vincenzo Lavigna	2 July 1808	Milan, Teatro alla Scala
Coriolano ossia L'assedio di Roma	opera seria	2 acts	Giuseppe Nicolini	26 December 1808	Milan, Teatro alla Scala
Palmerio e Claudia	dramma per musica	2 acts	Vincenzo Lavigna	20 January 1809	Torino, Teatro Regio
Ifigenia in Aulide	melodramma	2 acts	Vincenzo Federici	28 January 1809	Milan, Teatro alla Scala
Orcamo	opera		Vincenzo Lavigna	28 February 1809	Milan, Teatro alla Scala
L'amante prigioniero	opera		Bigatti	6 May 1809	Milan, Teatro alla Scala
Le rivali generose	melodramma giocoso	2 acts	Ercole Paganini and others	10 June 1809	Milan, Teatro alla Scala
Le avventure di una giornata	melodramma buffo	2 acts	Francesco Morlacchi	26 September 1809	Milan, Teatro alla Scala
La vestale	opera seria	3 acts	Vincenzo Pucitta	3 May 1810	London, King's Theatre
La contadina bizzarra	opera buffa		Giuseppe Farinelli	16 August 1810	Milan, Teatro alla Scala
Raul di Créqui	melodramma serio	2 acts	Johann Simon Mayr	26 December 1810	Milan, Teatro alla Scala
Abradate e Dircea	dramma per musica	2 acts	Giuseppe Nicolini	29 January 1811	Milan, Teatro alla Scala
Fedra	opera		Felice Alessandro Radicati	5 March 1811	London, King's Theatre
Chi non risica non rosica	dramma giocoso per musica	2 acts	Pietro Generali	18 May 1811	Milan, Teatro alla Scala
La casa dell'astrologo	opera buffa	2 acts	Giuseppe Nicolini	17 August 1811	Milan, Teatro alla Scala
Virginia	dramma serio per musica	3 acts	Pietro Casella	26 December 1811	Milan, Teatro alla Scala
Tancredi	melodramma serio	2 acts	Stefano Pavesi	18 January 1812	Milan, Teatro alla Scala
La vedova stravagante	opera	2 acts	Pietro Generali	30 March 1812	Milan, Teatro alla Scala
La pietra del paragone	melodramma giocoso	2 acts	Gioachino Rossini	26 September 1812	Milan, Teatro alla Scala
Tamerlano	melodramma serio	2 acts	Johann Simon Mayr	26 December 1812	Milan, Teatro alla Scala
L'isola di Calipso	opera seria	2 acts	Pietro Carlo Guglielmi	23 January 1813	Milan, Teatro alla Scala
Ernesto e Palmira	opera		Pietro Carlo Guglielmi	18 September 1813	Milan, Teatro alla Scala
Castore e Polluce	melodramma serio	2 acts	Felice Alessandro Radicati	27 May 1815	Bologna, Teatro del Corso
L'imboscata	opera	2 acts	Joseph Weigl	8 November 1815	Milan, Teatro alla Scala
L'eroismo in amore	melodramma serio	2 acts	Ferdinando Paër	26 December 1815	Milan, Teatro alla Scala
Margaritta d'Anjou ossia L'orfana d'Inghilterra	melodramma eroicomico	2 acts	Joseph Weigl	26 July 1816	Milan, Teatro alla Scala
Abradate e Dircea	dramma per musica	2 acts	Paolo Bonfichi	23 January 1817	Torino, Teatro Regio
La difesa di Goa	dramma per musica	3 acts	Raffaele Russo	17 January 1818	Torino, Teatro Regio
Adelaide di Borgogna	melodramma serio	2 acts	Pietro Generali	24 April 1819	Rovigo, Teatro Sociale
Fedra	melodramma serio	2 acts	Ferdinando Orlandi	10 June 1820	Padua, Teatro Nuovo
La conquista di Granata	melodramma serio	2 acts	Giuseppe Nicolini	26 December 1820	Venice, Teatro la Fenice
Fedra	melodramma serio	2 acts	Johann Simon Mayr	26 December 1820	Milan, Teatro alla Scala
La sciocca per astuzia	opera buffa	2 acts	Giuseppe Mosca	15 May 1821	Milan, Teatro alla Scala
Elisa e Claudio ossia L'amore protetto dall'amicizia	melodramma semiserio	2 acts	Saverio Mercadante	30 October 1821	Milan, Teatro alla Scala
Mandane, regina della Persia	opera seria	2 acts	Carlo Coccia	4 November 1821	Lisbon, Teatro São Carlos
Antigona e Lauso	opera seria	2 acts	Stefano Pavesi	26 January 1822	Milan, Teatro alla Scala
La dama locandiera ossia L'albergo de' pitocchi	opera buffa	2 acts	Giuseppe Mosca	8 April 1822	Milan, Teatro alla Scala
La vestale	melodramma serio	3 acts	Giovanni Pacini	6 February 1823	Milan, Teatro alla Scala
Le finte amazzoni	opera		Pietro Raimondi	15 May 1823	Milan, Teatro alla Scala
Aspasia e Agide	melodramma serio	2 acts	Giuseppe Nicolini	8 May 1824	Milan, Teatro alla Scala
Isabella ed Enrico	melodramma semiserio	2 acts	Giovanni Pacini	12 June 1824	Milan, Teatro alla Scala
La gelosia corretta	melodramma semiserio	3 acts	Giovanni Pacini	27 March 1826	Milan, Teatro alla Scala
Gli arabi nelle Gallie o sia Il trionfo della fede	melodramma serio	2 acts	Giovanni Pacini	8 March 1827	Milan, Teatro alla Scala
Saladino e Clotilde	melodramma tragico	2 acts	Nicola Vaccai	4 February 1828	Milan, Teatro alla Scala
