= I due Figaro =

I due Figaro may refer to:

- I due Figaro (Carafa), 1820 opera by Carafa and librettist Felice Romani
- I due Figaro (Mercadante), 1826 setting of the same libretto, premiered Madrid 1835
