= Louis Joseph Saint-Amans =

French composer (1749–1844)

Louis Joseph Saint-Amans (26 June 1749, Marseille - 29 July 1844, Paris) was a French composer.

== Biography ==
=== Early life ===
Louis Joseph Saint-Amans was born on 26 June 1749 in Marseille. Initially studying to be a lawyer, he abandoned his studies to focus on music.

=== Career ===
He travel around southern France with an Italian theater troupe performing opere buffe. He then spent three years in Italy as a tutor to the children of a Swiss baron. Interested in music, he studied the works of Italian composers on his own, ultimately deciding to pursue his own career as an opera composer.

He returned to Paris in 1769 and his first opéra comique, Dom Alvar et Mincia, débuted the following year. He composed several more operas and ballets over the next few years, some of which appeared at the Opéra National de Paris. However, none of these works were met with particular success.

In 1778, he moved to Brussels to become the conductor of the Théâtre de la Monnaie. He finally found success while working in Brussels, enjoying a six-year period of well received compositions. After returning to Paris in 1884, he was appointed professor of singing at the Ecole Royale de Chant (later the Paris Conservatoire).

He continued to write opéras comiques until the early years of the 19th century, but lack of critical acclaim and a move to Brest (following the loss of his position at the Conservatoire) may have led him to abandon composing for the stage during his last 15 years. Over his entire career, Saint-Amans wrote twenty-six operas, of which all but two have been lost. He also composed several religious works including a number of motets and oratorios. In 1807, he composed a Te Deum for Napoleon’s birthday celebrations.

=== Death ===
He died on 29 July 1844 in Paris.

== Operas ==
- Alvar et Mancia, ou Le Captif de retour (1770)
- La Coquette du village, ou Le Baiser pris et rendu (1771)
- Le Poirier (1772)
- Le Médecin de l'amour (1773)
- La Forêt enchantée (1774)
- Le Faux vieillard (1774)
- Oroés (1776)
- Daphnis et Thémire (1778)
- L'Occasion (1778/80)
- La Fausse veuve (1778)
- Psyché et l'Amour (1778)
- La Rosière de Salency (1778)
- Emirène (1780)
- La Fête de Flore (1784)
- Le Prix de l'arc (1785)
- Ninette à la cour, ou Le Caprice amoureux (1785)
- La Fée Urgèle (1788)
- Scène d'Alcyone (1789)
- Laurence (1790)
- L'Heureux démenti (1794)
- Aspasie (1795)
- Le Pauvre homme (1797)
- La Tireuse de cartes (1799)
- L'Isle déserte (1801)
- Chacun à son plan (1802)
- La Leçon littéraire (1807)

== Sources ==
- Elisabeth Cook. The New Grove Dictionary of Opera, edited by Stanley Sadie (1992), ISBN 0-333-73432-7 and ISBN 1-56159-228-5
- The Oxford Dictionary of Opera, by John Warrack and Ewan West (1992), ISBN 0-19-869164-5
