= Medea (Pacini) =

Opera composed by Giovanni Pacini

- Opera by Giovanni Pacini
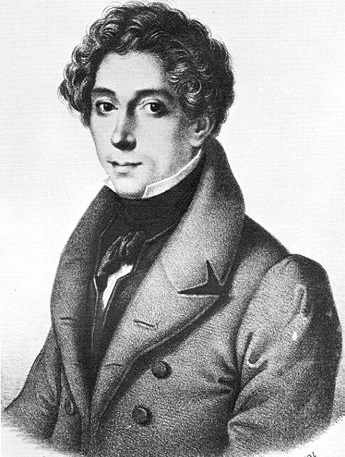
- Pacini
- Librettist: Benedetto Castiglia
- Language: Italian
- Based on: Médée by Corneille
- Premiere: 28 November 1843; Teatro Carolino, Palermo

Medea is an opera in three acts composed by Giovanni Pacini to a libretto by Benedetto Castiglia. It premiered on 28 November 1843 at the Teatro Carolino in Palermo, conducted by the composer with Geltrude Bortolotti in the title role. The libretto is based on the plays Medea by Euripides and Médée by Pierre Corneille.

== Performance history ==
Following its premiere on 28 November 1843 at the Teatro Carolino on Palermo, Pacini revised the work for its performance at the Teatro Eretenio in Vicenza in 1845. It was further revised for its first performance at La Fenice in Venice on 9 March 1850. The final and definitive version premiered at the Teatro San Carlo in Naples on 26 February 1853. For two decades Pacini's Medea enjoyed considerable popularity in Italy, Russia and South America. It then fell into obscurity, eclipsed by Bellini's Norma which has a similar story and Cherubini's Médée.

However, it has had some modern revivals, most notably the 1993 performance at the Teatro Gabriello Chiabrera in Savona conducted by Richard Bonynge with Jolanta Omilian in the title role (a live recording was released on the Agora label), and the 2006 semi-staged production at the ancient theatre of Taormina conducted by Tyrone Paterson with Simona Baldolini in the title role.

== Roles ==
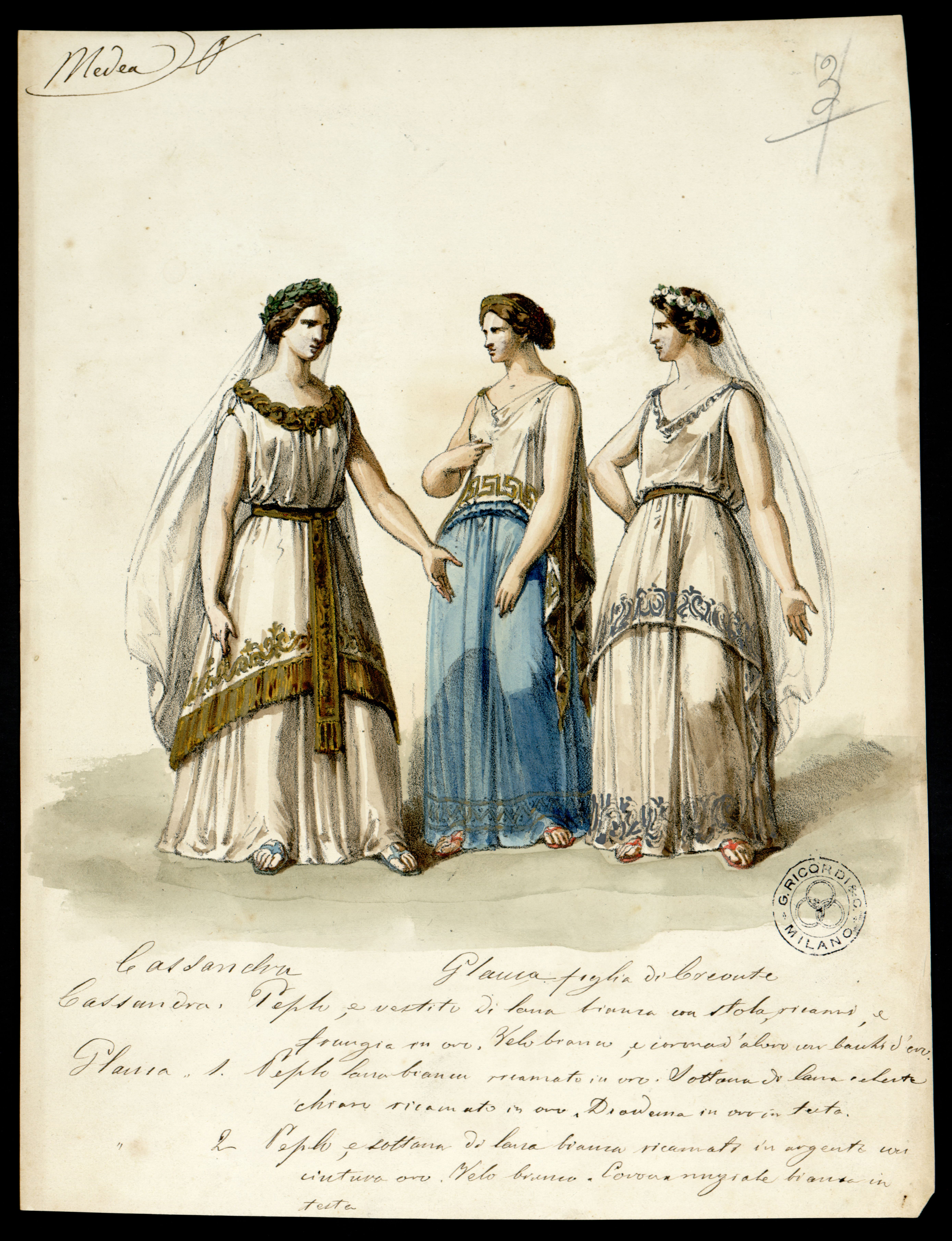
Cassandra and Glauca – costume design

Roles, voice types, premiere cast
Role	Voice type	Premiere cast 28 November 1843
Medea, a sorceress and Giasone's wife	soprano	Geltrude Bortolotti
Cassandra, a priestess	soprano	Giovanna Austin
Licisca, Medea's servant	soprano	Adelaide Orlandi
Giasone, former leader of the Argonauts	tenor	Giovanni Battista Pancani
Creonte, King of Corinth	bass	Luigi Valli
Calcante, a priest	bass	Secondo Torre
Choirs and walkers-on: Glauca. Girls. Women. Boys. People. Curetes. Priests. Archons. Matrons. Soldiers

== Synopsis ==
Setting: Corinth in Ancient Greece

The heroic warrior Giasone plans to abandon his wife Medea to marry Glauca the daughter of Creonte, the king of Corinth. In revenge Medea murders their two children and then commits suicide.

== Notable arias and duets ==
- "Odi sola in preda" – duet, Giasone and Medea, act 1
- "Ah dolci nel seno" – Medea in the finale of act 3 (added in the 1845 Vicenza revision)
