= Alessandro nelle Indie (Pacini) =

Opera seria in two acts by Giovanni Pacini

- Opera seria by Giovanni Pacini
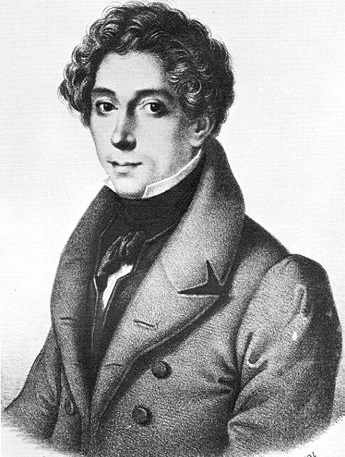
- Pacini
- Librettist: Andrea Leone Tottola; Giovanni Schmidt
- Language: Italian
- Based on: Alessandro nell'Indie by Metastasio
- Premiere: 29 September 1824; Teatro di San Carlo, Naples

Alessandro nelle Indie (Alexander in India) is an opera seria in two acts by Giovanni Pacini to a libretto by Andrea Leone Tottola and Giovanni Schmidt, based on Alessandro nell'Indie by Pietro Metastasio. It was premiered at the Teatro di San Carlo in Naples on 29 September 1824, and had a total of 38 performances in its first season.

This opera is one of some 70 operatic works using Metastasio's text about Alexander the Great, most of which were written in the 18th century, starting with the work by Leonardo Vinci (1730).

== Roles ==
Roles, voice types, premiere cast
Role	Voice type	Premiere cast, 29 September 1824 Conductor: Nicola Festa
Cleofide (Cleophis)	soprano	Adelaide Tosi
Poro	soprano	Caterina Lipparini
Alessandro Magno (Alexander the Great)	tenor	Andrea Nozzari
Gandarte	tenor	Giovanni Boccaccio
Timagene	bass	Carlo Moncada
Greek and Indian warriors, courtiers, priests

== Recording ==
- 2006: Laura Claycomb (Cleofide), Jennifer Larmore (Poro), Bruce Ford (tenor) (Alessandro Magno), Mark Wilde (Gandarte), Dean Robinson (Timagene); Geoffrey Mitchell Choir, London Philharmonic, David Parry (conductor). Recorded November 2006 at Henry Wood Hall, London. Label: Opera Rara ORC35
