= Teatro Carignano =

Theatre in Turin, Italy

Coordinates: 45.0693°N 7.6846°E

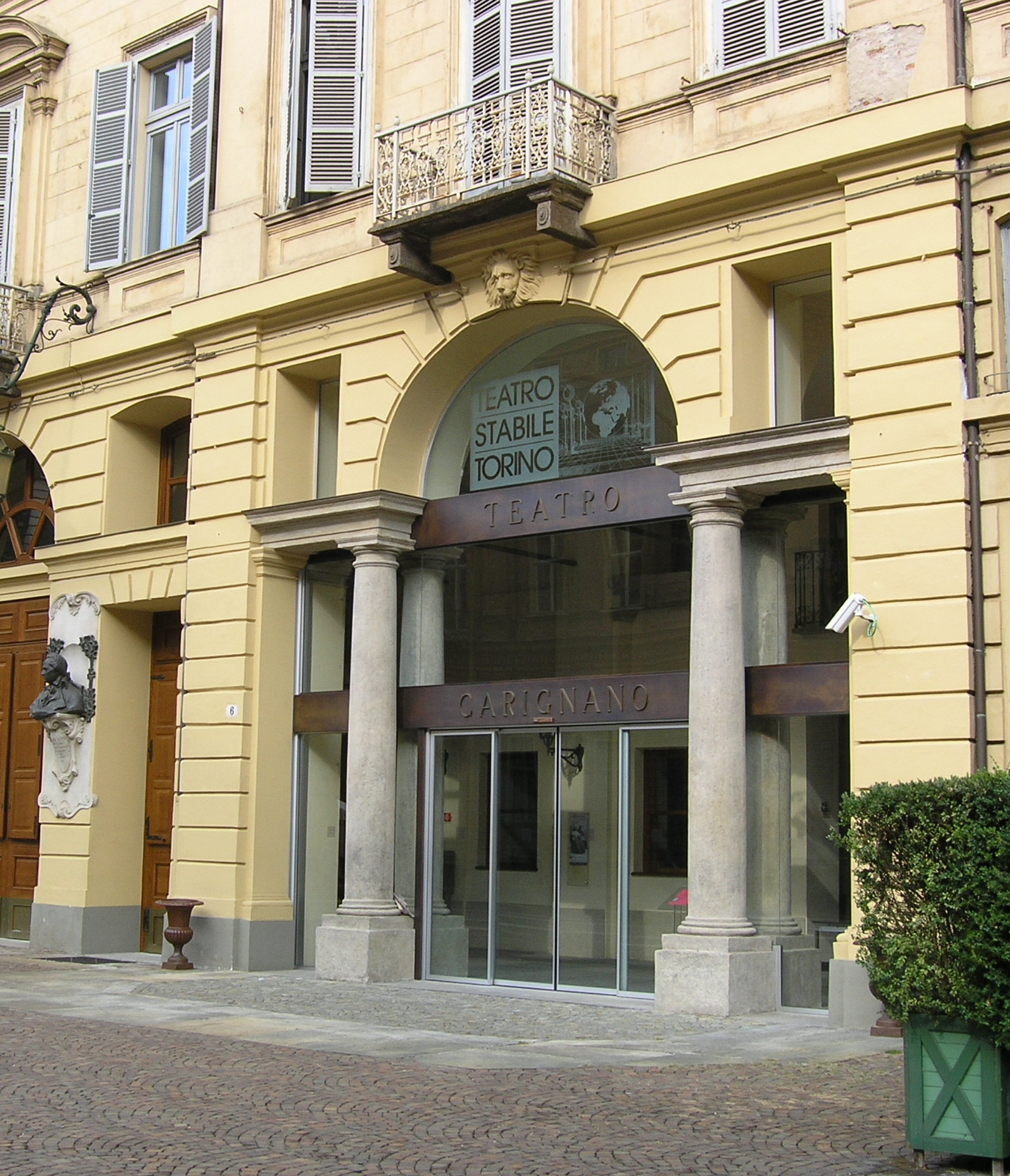
- Facade and main entrance
- Interactive map of Teatro Carignano
- Address: Piazza Carignano 6 Turin; Italy
- Owner: City of Turin
- Operator: Teatro Stabile di Torino
- Capacity: 875
- Current use: Theatre

Construction
- Opened: 1753
- Years active: 1753 – present
- Architect: Benedetto Alfieri

Website
- www.teatrostabiletorino.it

The Teatro Carignano (Carignano Theatre) is a theatre in Turin and one of the oldest and most important theatres in Italy. Designed by Benedetto Alfieri, it is located opposite the Palazzo Carignano. Building commenced in 1752 and the theatre was inaugurated the following year with a performance of Baldassare Galuppi's opera, Calamità de' cuori. Much of the theatre was destroyed in a fire in 1786, but it was rebuilt in a few months using Alfieri's original plans. Since then it has undergone several renovations. Although today it is primarily used for performances of plays, in the past it was an important opera house. The theatre is owned by the City of Turin but administered by the theatre company, Teatro Stabile di Torino, and is one of the company's principal performing venues.

== Premieres and debuts ==
Premieres and notable debuts at the Teatro Carignano include:

- Giovanni Pacini's opera La schiava in Bagdad (world premiere, 28 October 1820)
- Nicola Vaccai's opera La pastorella feudataria (world premiere, 18 September 1824)
- Dancer Domenico Ronzani's debut as a choreographer in the ballet La Morte di Procotieff (Autumn 1840)
- Teodulo Mabellini's opera Rolla (world premiere, 12 November 1840)
- Gaetano Donizetti's opera Linda di Chamounix (Italian premiere, 24 August 1842)
- Arrigo Boito's play Le madri galanti (world premiere, March 1863)
- Giovanni Verga's play Cavalleria rusticana starring Eleonora Duse (world premiere, 14 January 1884)
- Italian conducting debut of Arturo Toscanini at the age of 19 in Alfredo Catalani's Edmea (4 November 1886)

== Sources ==
- Casaglia, Gherardo (2005). "Teatro Carignano". L'Almanacco di Gherardo Casaglia (in Italian).
- Crotti, Ilaria and Ricorda, Ricciarda (1992). Scapigliatura e dintorni. PICCIN. ISBN 8829910198 (in Italian)
- Dyment, Christopher (2012). Toscanini in Britain. Boydell Press. ISBN 1843837897
- Pandiani, Paola (2003). I luoghi della musica. Touring Editore. ISBN 8836528104 (in Italian)
- Sadie, Stanley and Macy, Laura (eds.) (2006). The Grove Book of Operas, 2nd edition. Oxford University Press. ISBN 0195309073,
- Teatro Stabile di Torino. Teatro Carignano. Retrieved 28 January 2013.
- Zietz, Karyl Lynn (1999). Opera Companies and Houses of Western Europe, Canada, Australia, and New Zealand, 3rd edition. McFarland. ISBN 0786406119
