= Carlo di Borgogna =

Italian opera by Giovanni Pacini

- Opera by Giovanni Pacini
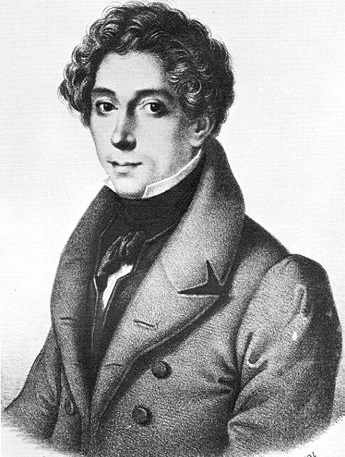
- Pacini
- Librettist: Gaetano Rossi
- Language: Italian
- Premiere: 21 February 1835; La Fenice, Venice

Carlo di Borgogna is an Italian opera (melodramma romantico) in three parts composed by Giovanni Pacini to a libretto by Gaetano Rossi. It was first performed at the Teatro la Fenice, Venice, on 21 February 1835.

== Roles ==
Role	Voice type	Premiere, 21 February 1835 (Conductor:-)
Carlo, Duke of Burgundy	tenor	Domenico Donzelli
Leonora di Jork	soprano	Henriette Méric-Lalande
Arnoldo, Count of Ivrj	baritone	Domenico Cosselli
Estella, his daughter	mezzo-soprano	Giuditta Grisi
Amelia, a relative of the Ivrj family	soprano	Mariella Bramati
Lord Athol, Ambassador of England	tenor	Lorenzo Lombardi
Guglielmo d'Erlach, a Swiss Knight	bass	Antonio Solari

== Synopsis ==
Time:
Place: Dijon (part one) and Switzerland (parts two and three)

Part One

The people of Burgundy have come to greet Carlo “il temerario” (Charles the Bold) from his quelling of the citizens of Liège. Among the girls who are strewing flowers at his feet and presenting him with a crown of laurels is Estella, the daughter of Carlo's mentor Arnoldo. During this ceremony, it is impossible for the two to hide their feelings for each other (Cavatina, Del ciel cura, quest’alloro). Lord Athol then arrives with a letter from England, reminding Carlo of his promise to marry Leonora, the sister of Edward IV. Athol suspects Carlo is less than happy with the match, however.

In Arnoldo's apartments of the ducal palace, Amelia suggests to Estella that she is about to become Duchess of Burgundy. When Carlo arrives, however, it is to announce the news of his betrothal to Leonora (Terzetto, Ad un’altra). Arnoldo is outraged by this and denounces Carlo as a seducer, promising his vengeance will be quick.

Leonora arrives in Burgundy (Cavatina, Vago ciel del caro sposo) and is not exactly pleased when Carlo is late for their immediate wedding ceremony. When he does arrive, he is at first distant with her but decides to get on with it when Estella appears, mad with rage, claiming Carlo for herself (Terzetto, ‘Mira un dio). Lord Athol orders her to be arrested, but Carlo tells him he has no right. Arnoldo appears to defend his daughter’s honour and, duelling with Athol, is wounded. Estella flees as Leonora declares England will avenge her.

Part Two

The inhabitants of a Swiss village celebrate the arrival of their “angel”, who arrived a year ago and has helped them ever since. Guglielmo appears and incites all to defend themselves against the invading Burgundians. A warrior in black armour arrives and Guglielmo recognises him as Arnoldo, who has survived his duel with Athol and is now searching for his daughter. He joins their cause on the condition they allow him to remain anonymous (Aria, D’essa in traccia). Athol and Leonora (dressed as a knight) enter, having become separated from Carlo’s army. Athol goes off to find somewhere to pass the approaching storm, and Leonora is soon joined by Arnoldo, who recognises her as being an enemy but nonetheless allows her to pass through unscathed as per Swiss custom (Duetto, Carlo di guerra è il fulmine).

Estella, the locals’ “angel”, is brooding when Amelia announces the arrival of two guests. She leaves by a concealed door when Amelia brings them in – they are Carlo and one of his knights, Oberto. Oberto retires for the night, and Carlo’s thoughts turn to Estella. She suddenly appears to confront him with his crime, despite his protestations of continued love (Duetto-finale, L’ombra mira di colei). She unveils a tomb inscribed “Arnoldo d’Ivrj”, with an open tomb next to it “for Estella d’Ivrj”. Carlo draws his sword and asks her to kill him, but she refuses. Carlo hears the horns of his followers and leaves to join them; Estella returning through the concealed door.

Part Three

A skirmish is taking place near a priory. Leonora, still dressed as a knight, is captured by Guglielmo, but just as the troops call for her death, Estella appears as the “angel”, heavily veiled. The two women recognise each other, and accuse each other of destroying their happiness (Duetto, Ciel! Tu…). Just as Leonora expects to be ordered to death, Estella orders her to be conducted safely to Carlo's forces.

The Swiss are preparing an ambush in a craggy gorge, pushing boulders to the precipice ready to crush the Burgundian armies in the gorge below. When Carlo's troops appear, Estella, on one of the rocky heights, warns them not to come any further. Carlo rallies his troops, however (Aria, Del Leone di Borgogna). Leonora arrives, still trying to rejoin Carlo's forces (Aria, Or io prego. Deh! Lasciate…). Carlo appears on a bridge across the gorge, but is accosted by Arnoldo and the two fight. Leonora is forced by Guglielmo to watch as Arnoldo cuts him down, and Carlo's body falls into the gorge below as the Swiss troops hurl the boulders down onto the Burgundian army. Estella recognises Arnoldo long enough to fall dead in his arms, and the opera ends with the Swiss celebrating their victory (Finale, Vi salvate: il tradimento).

== Recordings ==
Year	Cast (Carlo, Leonora, Arnoldo, Estella)	Conductor, Opera House and Orchestra	Label
2001	Bruce Ford, Elizabeth Futral, Roberto Frontali, Jennifer Larmore	David Parry, Academy of St. Martin in the Fields and Geoffrey Mitchell Choir	CD: Opera Rara; ORC21
