= Gli arabi nelle Gallie =

Opera by Giovanni Pacini (1827)

- Opera by Giovanni Pacini
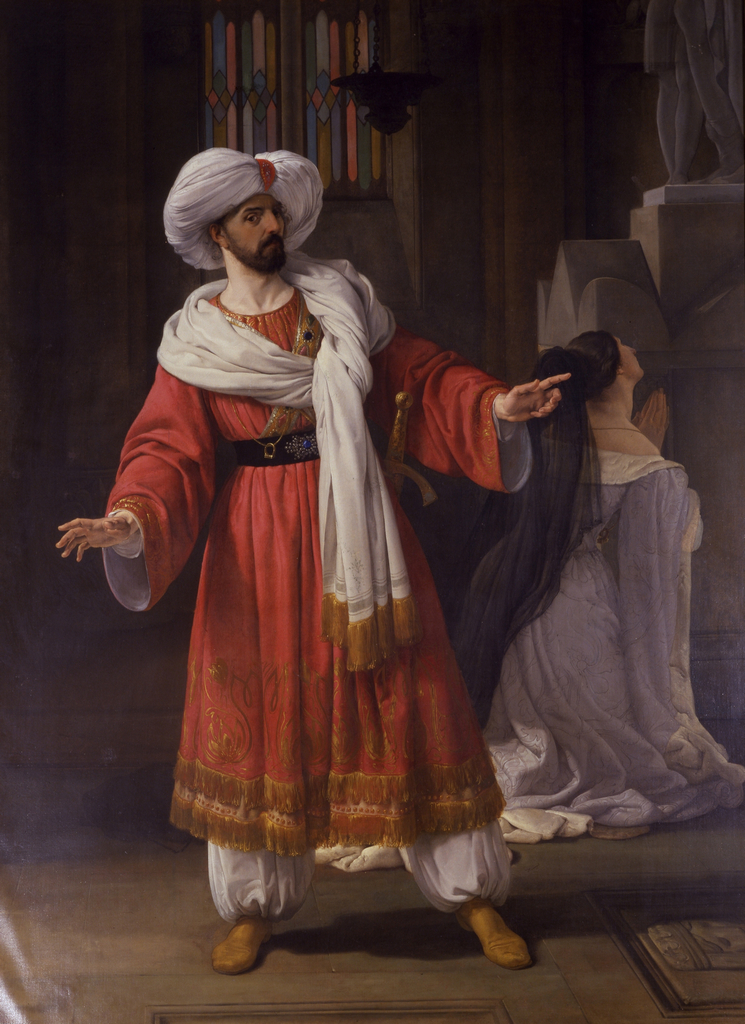
- Giovanni David as the Arab commander Agobar, the opera's protagonist
- Librettist: Luigi Romanelli
- Premiere: 8 March 1827; La Scala, Milan

Gli arabi nelle Gallie, ossia Il trionfo della fede (The Arabs in Gaul, or The triumph of Faith) is an opera in two acts composed by Giovanni Pacini to a libretto by Luigi Romanelli. The opera is in the opera seria genre with a libretto based on Prévot's 1822 novel Le Renégat. Gli Arabi nelle Gallie premiered on 8 March 1827 at La Scala in Milan. Between 1827 and the late 1830s it was performed throughout Italy as well as in Spain, France, and Austria. It was also the first of Pacini's operas to be performed in North America when a production was mounted in 1834 at New York's Italian Opera House.

== Roles and premiere cast ==
Roles, voice types, and premiere cast
Role	Voice type	Premiere cast, 8 March 1827
Ezilda, Princess of Civenna	soprano	Stefania Favelli
Leodato. Prince of Auvergne and general in Charles Martel's army	contralto	Brigida Lorenzani-Nerici
Agobar, supreme commander of the Arabs	tenor	Giovanni David
Gondair, confidante of Princess Ezilda	bass	Vincenzo Galli
Zarele, directress of the convent	mezzosoprano	Teresa Ruggeri-Visanetti
Aloar, Arab general and intimate friend of Agobar altro generale arabo, intimo amico di Agobar tenor	tenor	Lorenzo Lombardi
Mohamud, Arab general and secret enemy of Agobar	tenor	Carlo Salvatore Poggiali
Mountaineers, Arab soldiers, women of the convent

== Recordings ==
Pianist Rosemary Tuck, conductor Richard Bonynge and the English Chamber Orchestra recorded "Introduction et Variations Brillantes" sur le Marche de Gli arabi nelle Gallie for Naxos (8.573254) in 2015.
