= La schiava in Bagdad =

Pacini opera

- Opera by Giovanni Pacini
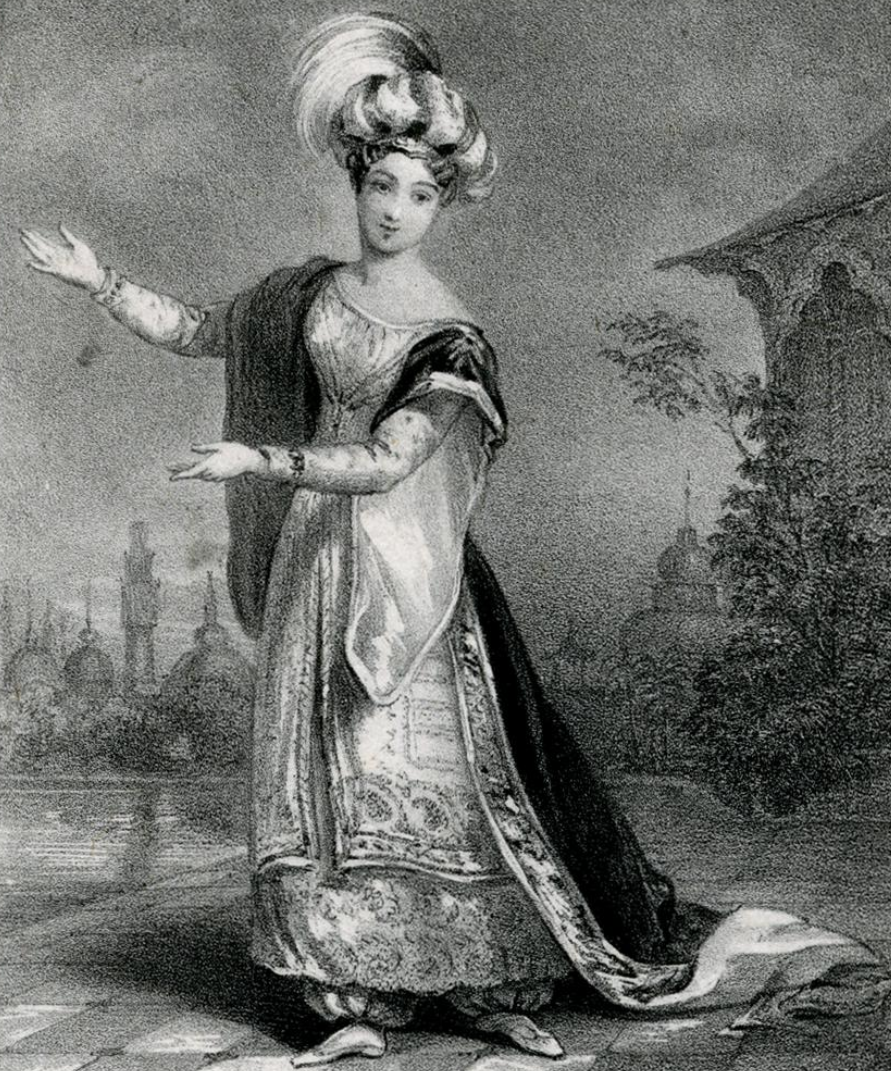
- Rosalbina Caradori as the opera's protagonist, Zora the slave girl, London c.1827
- Librettist: Vittorio Pezzi
- Premiere: 28 October 1820; Teatro Carignano, Turin

La schiava in Bagdad (The Slave Girl in Baghdad) is an opera in two acts composed by Giovanni Pacini to a libretto by Vittorio Pezzi. It premiered on 28 October 1820 at the Teatro Carignano in Turin. In the 20 years following its premiere it was performed throughout Italy as well as in Spain, Russia, and England. Set in Baghdad, the plot involves the efforts of a Syrian prince to rescue his beloved Zora who is being held as a slave girl in the city. The prince is assisted in his mission by a wily shoemaker who had once been his servant.

== Background and performance history ==
Subtitled Il papucciaio (The Shoemaker), La schiava in Bagdad is a dramma giocoso, a frequent genre in Pacini's early works. Pezzi's libretto was based on the story, but not the text, of an earlier libretto by Felice Romani, Il califo e la schiava (The Caliph and the Slave Girl) which was set by Francesco Basili and premiered at La Scala in 1819. Pacini's opera premiered at Turin's Teatro Carignano on 28 October 1820 starring Giuditta Pasta as the slave girl Zora and was performed in a double-bill with the premiere of Giacomo Serafini's ballet L'amicizia tradita.

Following its premiere, La schiava in Bagdad was performed in most of the major cities of Italy, including Venice (Teatro San Benedetto, 1825), Milan (Teatro della Canobbiana, 1825), Naples (Teatro San Carlo, 1826), Genoa (Teatro Carlo Felice, 1829), and Florence (Teatro della Pergola, 1831). The opera had its London premiere at the King's Theatre in December 1826 with Rosalbina Caradori as Zora. Other performances outside Italy included Barcelona (1822 and 1827), Madrid (1827), St. Petersburg (1830) and Odessa (1834). One of the last known performances of the opera was in Cagliari in 1839 with Carolina Pateri as Zora and Luigi Giorza as the Caliph.

In his review of the first London performances, the critic for The New Monthly Magazine wrote that La schiava in Bagdad had considerable success with the audience, largely due to the bravura performances of the singers in the leading roles—Carlo Zucchelli as the Caliph and Rosalbina Caradori as Zora, a particularly demanding role. He described the opera's music as attractive and lively albeit heavily reliant on Rossini in both its style and form and went so far as to claim that Pacini's score exhibited "many barefaced plagiarisms" from several of Rossini's works.

== Roles and premiere cast ==
Roles, voice types, and premiere cast
Role	Voice type	Premiere cast, 28 October 1820
The Caliph	bass	Pio Botticelli
Zora, a slave girl in the seraglio of Baghdad	soprano	Giuditta Pasta
Nadir, Prince of Syria and lover of Zora	tenor	Savino Monelli
Tamas, the Caliph's confidante	bass	Giovambattista Cipriani
Zulma, guardian of the slave girls	soprano	Adelaide Cassago
Mustafà, a shoemaker	bass	Luigi Pacini
Rustano, a slave merchant	tenor	Angelo Quadri
The Caliph's guards, merchants, male and female slaves

== Synopsis ==
The story is set in the city of Baghdad at an indeterminate time.

=== Act 1 ===
The act opens in the main piazza of Baghdad on market day. The slave trader Rustano and the shoemaker Mustafà are touting their merchandise. Tamas, the Caliph's confidante, arrives and orders Rustano to bring all his slave girls to the seraglio as the Caliph is planning to choose a new wife from amongst them. Nadir, a Syrian prince arrives with two of his own slaves. He has come to the city to search for his lover, Zora, who had been carried away by force. As he leaves the piazza, he bumps into Mustafà and causes him to drop all the shoes he had been carrying. They soon recognize each other. Mustafà had been Nadir's slave in Syria, but after he was given his freedom, he came to Baghdad and set himself up as a shoemaker. Nadir tells him about his lost Zora and how he has been searching for her in seraglio after seraglio for over a year. Mustafà tells Nadir that Zora was one of the slave girls on sale by Rustano and had recently been brought to the Caliph's seraglio. Nadir vows to look for her there despite the danger, and Mustafà offers to help him.

The scene shifts to the courtyard of the seraglio where Zora is lamenting her fate. Tamas arrives with the announcement that the Caliph has chosen her to be his new wife. The Caliph arrives and pays to court to Zora. She reluctantly agrees to the marriage but is inwardly full of doubts. Nadir and Mustafà enter the seraglio. Mustafà claims that he has come to supply elegant slippers for the slave girls. Nadir is disguised as Mustafà’s slave. Nadir approaches Zora who recognizes him as her lost lover and the two profess their love for each other. Nadir and Mustafà promise to return later that evening and rescue Zora.

=== Act 2 ===
Preparations are underway for Zora and the Caliph's marriage procession. Nadir and Mustafà return to the courtyard of the seraglio planning to liberate Zora. This time Mustafà is disguised at Zulma, the woman who looks after the seraglio's slave girls. They find Zora, and she and Nadir again profess their love for each other. However, the plot is discovered. Nadir is led off in chains to face execution. The Caliph berates Zora for her perfidy. Both she and Mustafà are now in chains as well. She is distraught at Nadir’s impending execution.

Tamas arrives bearing a medallion with a woman's portrait on it. Nadir had asked him to give it to Zora as a gift from her dead mother. The Caliph recognizes the portrait on the medallion. He asks Zora what her mother's name was and where she lived. On hearing her answers, he realizes that Zora is in fact his long-lost daughter. Nadir's execution is called off. The young lovers are reunited, the Caliph has found a daughter, and all rejoice at the outcome.
