= Giovanni Pacini =

Italian composer

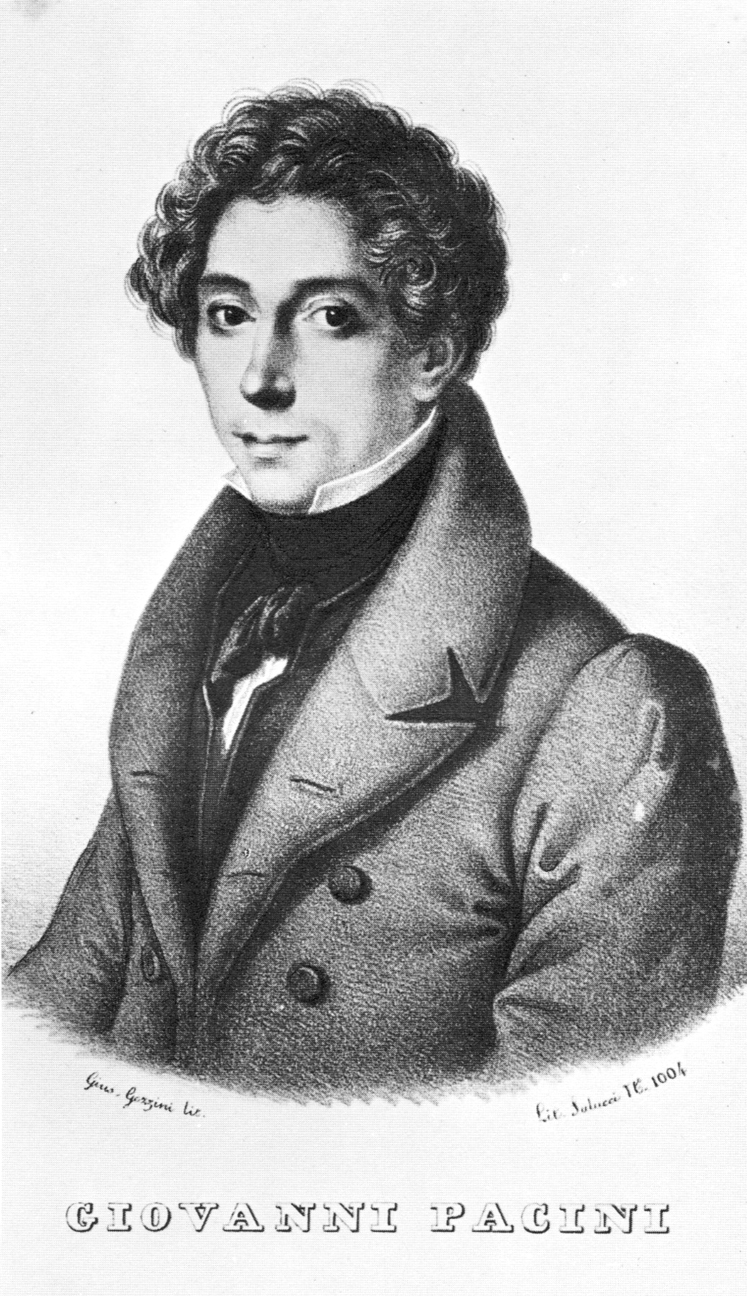
- Pacini c. 1835 (original etching by G. Gazzini)
- Born: 11 February 1796; Catania, Sicily
- Died: 6 December 1867 (aged 71); Pescia, Tuscany
- Occupations: Composer; Academic teacher
- Organizations: Florence Conservatory

Giovanni Pacini (11 February 1796 – 6 December 1867) was an Italian composer from the late Classical and early Romantic eras. He is best known for his operas. Pacini was born in Catania, Sicily, the son of the buffo Luigi Pacini, who was to appear in the premieres of many of Giovanni's operas. The family was of Tuscan origin, living in Catania when the composer was born. He served as the Florence Conservatory's first director from 1849 through 1862.

His first 25 or so operas were written when Gioachino Rossini dominated the Italian operatic stage. But Pacini's operas were "rather superficial", a fact which, later, he candidly admitted in his Memoirs. For some years he held the post of director of the Teatro San Carlo in Naples. Later, retiring to Viareggio to found a school of music, Pacini took time to assess the state of opera in Italy and, during a five-year period during which he stopped composing, laid out his ideas in his Memoirs. Like Saverio Mercadante, who also reassessed the strength and weaknesses of this period in opera, Pacini's style did change, but he quickly became eclipsed by the rising influence of Giuseppe Verdi on the Italian operatic scene, and many of his operas appeared to be old fashioned and rarely, if ever, appeared outside of Italy." Pacini's work is largely forgotten today, although some recordings do exist.

== Career as composer ==
During his lifetime, Pacini wrote some 74 operas. This is less than earlier estimates, which ranged from 80 to 90, since it has now been ascertained that many were just alternate titles for other works. It has been noted that he "bothered little about harmony and instrumentation", a fact supported by Rossini who once said: "God help us if he knew music. No one could resist him". Certainly, Pacini recognized Rossini's strengths and his dominance during this period: "Everyone followed the same school, the same fashions, and as a result they were all imitators of the great luminary .... If I was a follower of the great man from Pesaro, so was everyone else"

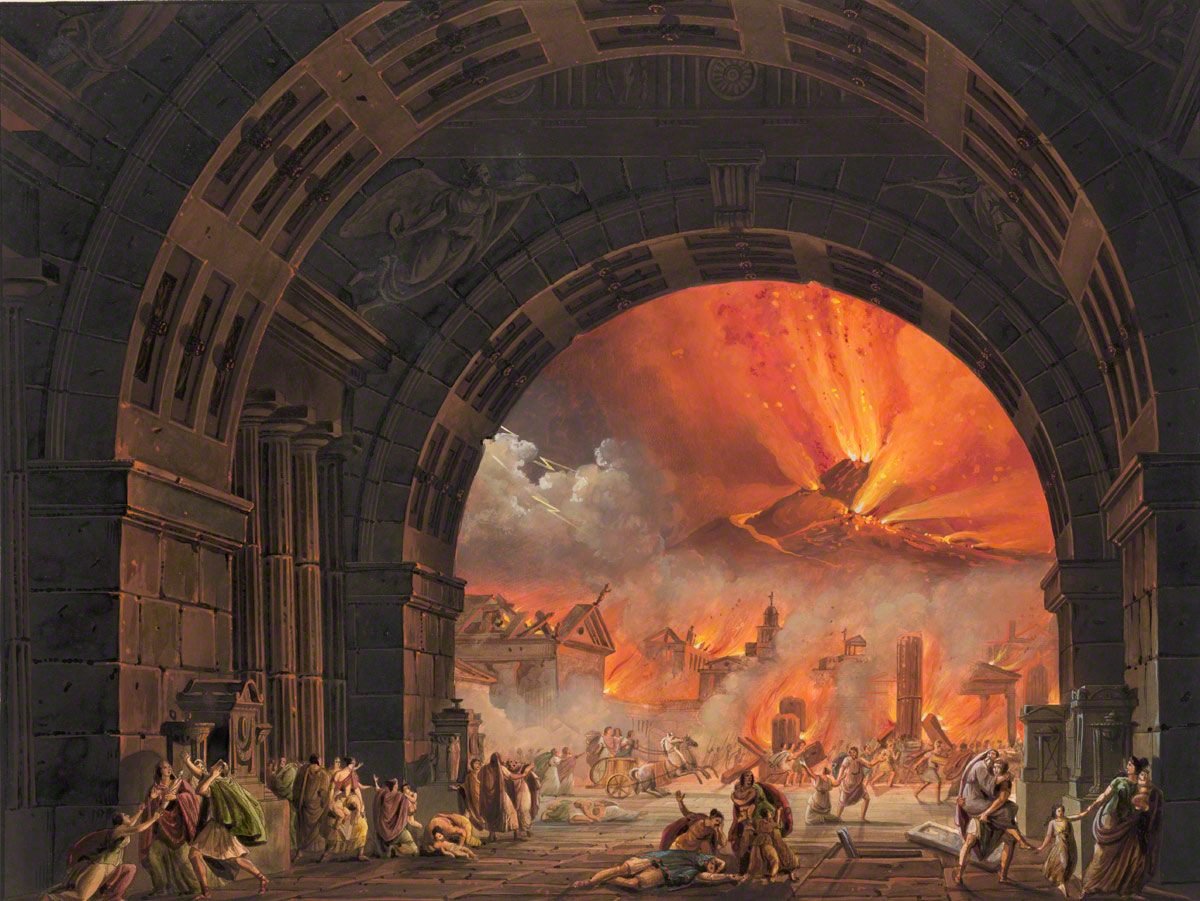
The final scene of L'ultimo giorno di Pompei using a set designed by Alessandro Sanquirico

After Rossini moved to Paris in 1824, Pacini and his contemporaries (Giacomo Meyerbeer, Nicola Vaccai, Michele Carafa, Carlo Coccia, Vincenzo Bellini, Gaetano Donizetti, the brothers Federico and Luigi Ricci, and Saverio Mercadante) collectively began to change the nature of Italian opera and took bel canto singing in a new direction. Orchestration became heavier, coloratura was reduced, especially for men's voices, and more importance was placed on lyrical pathos. While there were exceptions, romantic leads were assigned to tenors (in Rossini's time, they were frequently sung by alto or mezzo-soprano women). Villains became basses or later baritones (while they often were tenors for Rossini). Over time, far more emphasis was placed on the drama.

The role that Pacini played in instituting these changes is only now beginning to be recognized. There is little doubt that Pacini and his contemporary Nicola Vaccai exerted a stronger influence on Bellini than has been credited before. This change in attitude can be credited to the revival of two key works: Vaccai's Giulietta e Romeo and Pacini's L'ultimo giorno di Pompei, both composed in 1825 within a few weeks of each other.

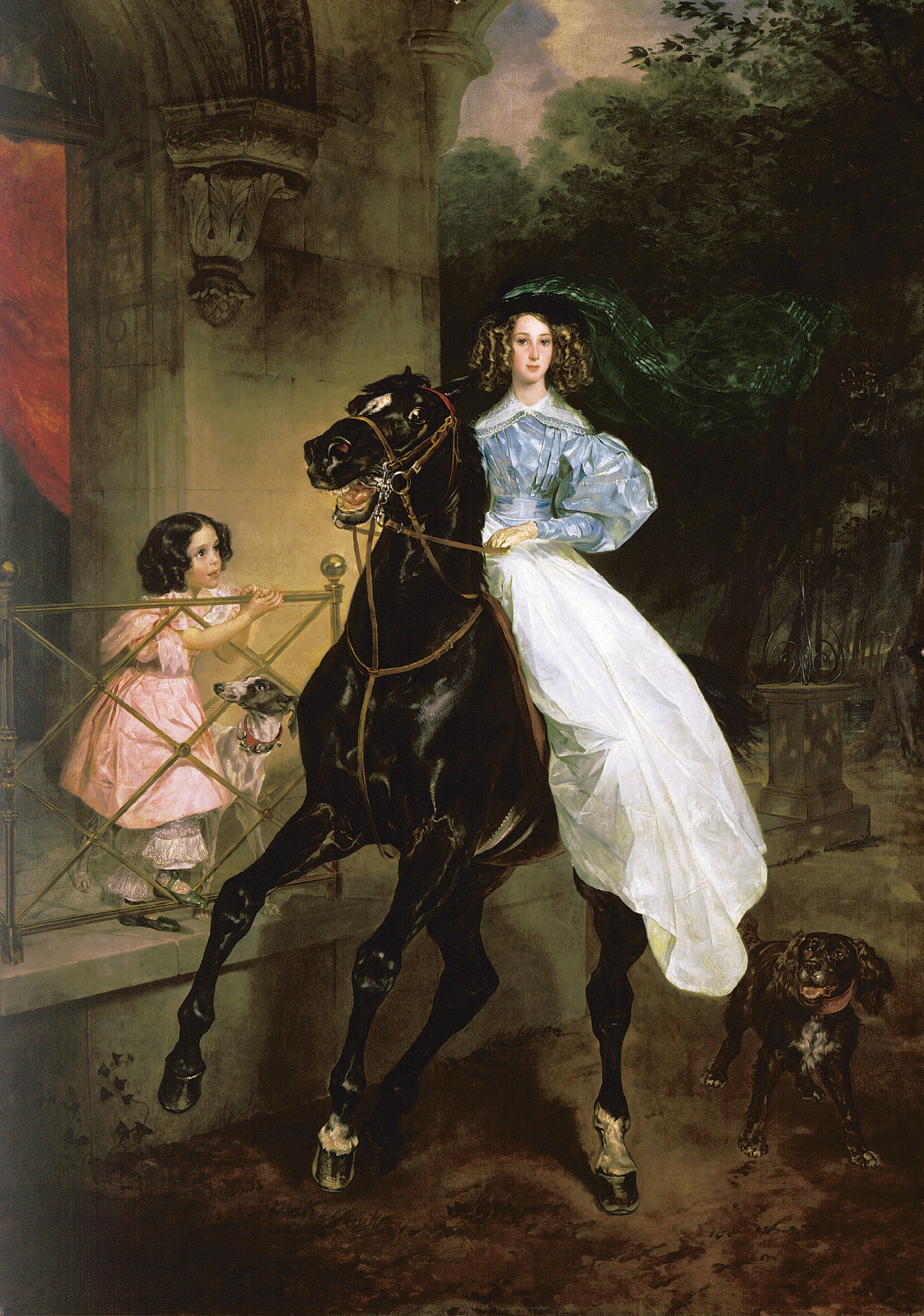
Daughters of Pacini, Giovannina and Amazilia, Horsewoman, 1832, by Karl Bryullov.

The success of many of Pacini's lighter operas especially Il Barone di Dolsheim, La sposa fedele, and La schiava in Bagdad (all composed between 1818 and 1820) made Pacini one of the most prominent composers in Italy. His position was greatly enhanced by the rapid-fire successes of Alessandro nelle Indie (Naples, 1824, revised, Milan, 1826; given and recorded in London in November 2006), Amazilia (Naples 1824, revised, Vienna, 1827), and the previously mentioned L'Ultimo giorno di Pompei (Naples, 1825).

In Alessandro nelle Indie, the title role of Alessandro was created by a baritonal tenor, Andrea Nozzari, but it was sung by the much lighter-voiced Giovanni David at the Milan revival, indicating Pacini's desire to go in a new direction. Gli arabi nelle Gallie (Milan, 1827) reached many of the world's most important stages and was the first Pacini opera to be given in the United States. It was staged frequently in Italy, and it was not until 1830 that Bellini's first success, Il pirata (also Milan, 1827) passed Gli arabi nelle Gallie in number of performances at the Teatro alla Scala. While this is not generally recognized, it was Pacini, rather than Donizetti, Mercadante or Bellini, who gave Rossini the stiffest competition in Italy during the 1820s.

Many operas followed that are almost completely forgotten. However, one of these, Il corsaro (Rome, 1831) was revived 173 years later, in 2004, albeit only with piano accompaniment. This work is different in many ways from Verdi's later opera by the same name. The title role, Corrado, is a musico role for an alto, and the villainous Seid is a tenor.

However, first Bellini and then Donizetti outstripped Pacini in fame. Many of his later operas, such as Carlo di Borgogna of 1835, were failures, but this is one of the few Pacini operas currently available on CD, and it has received many warm reviews. Pacini himself was the first to recognize his apparent defeat noted in memoirs: "I began to realize that I must withdraw from the field. Bellini, the divine Bellini, has surpassed me." Some years later, he resumed composing, and, after one more setback, enjoyed his greatest triumph with Saffo (Naples, 1840).

After Saffo, Pacini entered into another period of prominence. Donizetti had departed for Paris, Bellini had died, and Mercadante's major successes were behind him, thus Verdi offered the only important competition. Pacini's successes during this time period include La fidanzata corsa (Naples, 1842), Maria, regina d'Inghilterra (Palermo, 1843), Medea (Palermo, 1843 with several later revisions, the last of which was in Naples in 1853), Lorenzino de' Medici (Venice, 1845), Bondelmonte (Florence, 1845), Stella di Napoli (Naples,1845) and La regina di Cipro (Turin, 1846). Allan Cameron (Venice, 1848) is noteworthy because it deals with the youth of King Charles II, before he was crowned King of England. In contrast—by 1844—Verdi had written Nabucco, I Lombardi, and Ernani, thus outstripping Pacini.

This period of accomplishments was followed by a long but slow decline, marked only by the moderate successes of La punizione (Venice, 1854), Il saltimbanco (Rome, 1858), and Niccolò de' Lapi (Florence, 1873).

Pacini died in Pescia, Tuscany, in 1867. During his lifetime, he produced much music of high caliber. His output of more than 70 stage works is staggering even compared to Rossini (41 operas) and Handel (43 operas), and he will always be remembered, with Donizetti, as one of the most prolific composers in the history of opera.

== Operas ==
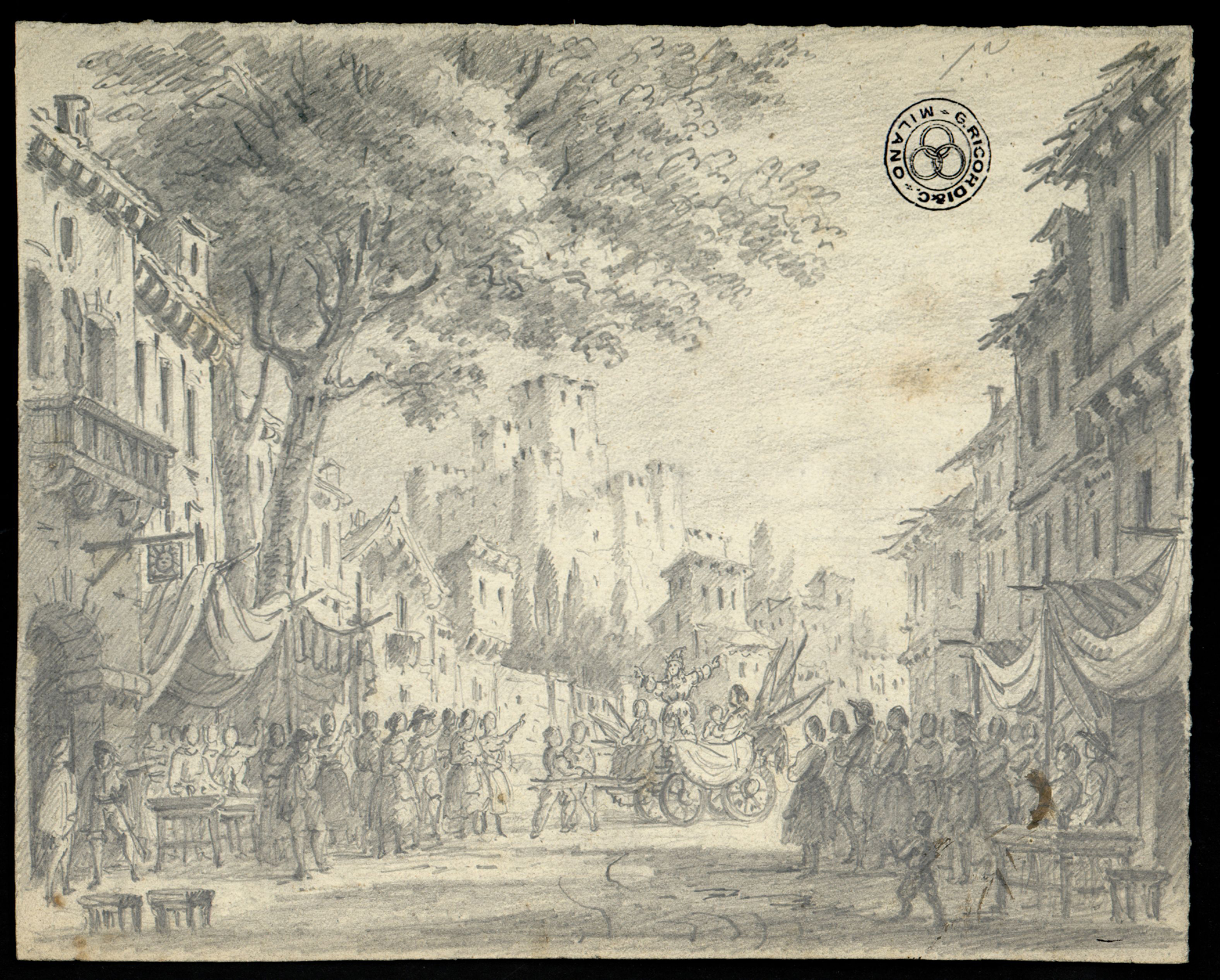
Piazzale adorno d'alberi all'esterno di un villaggio: è il dì della festa, set design for Il Saltimbanco act 1 scene 1 (1858).
