= Anna Mombelli =

Italian opera singer

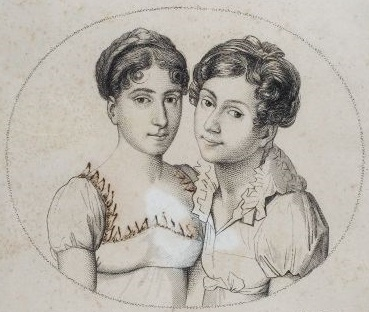
- Anna Mombelli (right) with her sister Ester (left)
- Born: Marianna Mombelli; 1795; Naples, Italy
- Died: after 1817
- Other names: Annetta Mombelli
- Occupation: opera singer
- Relatives: Domenico Mombelli (father); Vincenza Viganò (mother); Ester Mombelli (sister)

Anna Mombelli, born Marianna Mombelli, (1795 – after 1817) was an Italian opera singer who sang both mezzo-soprano and contralto roles. She is primarily known for having created the role of Siveno in Rossini's first opera Demetrio e Polibio in 1812.

Mombelli was born in Naples, the second of Domenico Mombelli and Vincenza Viganò-Mombelli's twelve children. She was trained in singing by her father who had been a prominent tenor in the 1780s and 90s. She often appeared in the Mombelli family's opera troupe along with her elder sister Ester in further productions of Demetrio e Polibio as well as in the premiere of Carlo Coccia's Evellina. She also appeared with her sister in the world premiere of Vincenzo Migliorucci's cantata Paolo e Virginia.

According to Fétis, she sang with success in Milan during the 1814, 1815, and 1816 seasons and also appeared as Tisbe to Ester's Angelina in La Cenerentola at the Teatro Carignano in 1817. Mombelli retired from the stage shortly after her marriage in 1817 to the journalist Angelo Lambertini whom Henry Prunières described as "a savant and a fool, an excellent violin player and an intimate friend of Rossini's."

== Roles created ==
- Siveno in Rossini's Demetrio e Polibio, Teatro Valle, Rome, 18 May 1812
- Paolo in Vincenzo Migliorucci's Paolo e Virginia, Teatro Valle, Rome, 4 July 1812
- Edregardo, Conte di Douglas in Carlo Coccia's Evellina, Teatro del Re, Milan, 26 December 1814
