= Frezzolini =

Frezzolini is an Italian surname. Notable people with the surname include:

- Erminia Frezzolini (1818-1884), Italian opera singer
- Giorgio Frezzolini (born 1976), Italian football player
- Giuseppe Frezzolini (1789-1861), Italian opera singer
