= Ronconi =

Ronconi is an Italian surname. Notable people with the surname include:

- Amato Ronconi (1225–1292), Italian Roman Catholic saint and professed member of the Secular Franciscan Order
- Domenico Ronconi (1772 – 1839), Italian operatic tenor, teacher and father of 3 singers including Giorgio
- Giorgio Ronconi (1810 – 1890), Italian operatic baritone
- Aldo Ronconi (1918 – 2012), Italian professional road bicycle racer
- Pio Filippani Ronconi (1920 – 2010), Italian orientalist
- Luca Ronconi (1933 – 2015), Italian actor, theater director, and opera director
- Gianni Ronconi (born 1952), Italian hurdler
