= Pio Botticelli =

Italian opera singer (1789–1855)

- Born: 8 January 1789; Rome, Papal States
- Died: 6 September 1855 (aged 66); Venice, Austrian Empire
- Occupation: Opera singer (bass-baritone)

Pio Botticelli (8 January 1789 – 6 September 1855) was an Italian bass-baritone active in the opera houses of Italy from 1810 until the mid-1840s. Amongst the numerous roles he created in world premieres were Pietro il Grande (Peter the Great) in Donizetti's Il falegname di Livonia and The Caliph in Pacini's La schiava in Bagdad. He also sang the role of Leucippo in the Austrian premiere of Rossini's Zelmira.

== Life and career ==
Botticelli, was born in Rome, the son of Salvatore Botticelli who was also a noted bass. His earliest recorded performance was in 1810 when he sang the role of Montezo in Nicola Antonio Manfroce's Alzira at the Teatro Valle in Rome. From 1813 until 1816, he was a singer in the Basilica della Santa Casa in Loreto. During that time he also appeared on the opera stage, creating the roles of Aldano in the premiere of Carlo Coccia's Evellina at the Teatro Re in 1814 and The Spirit of Austria in Vincenzo Federici and Ferdinando Orlandi's Il mistico omaggio at La Scala in 1815.

From the 1820s he began appearing in the leading bass roles of numerous Rossini operas — Figaro in The Barber of Seville, Walter in William Tell, Douglas in La donna del lago, Leucippo in Zelmira, Dandini in La Cenerentola, Fernando in La gazza ladra, Guglielmo in Elisabetta, regina d'Inghilterra, Mosè in Mosè in Egitto, and Mustafà in L'italiana in Algeri.

Botticelli's last stage performances were in Zara, where he appeared in the 1845 carnival season as Alcandro in Pacini's Saffo and in the title roles of Nabucco and Marino Faliero. He spent his later years in Venice where he died at the age of 66 after a three-week illness. He was survived by his wife and several children.

== Roles created ==
Roles created by Botticelli in world premieres include:

- Montezo in Alzira – composed by Nicola Antonio Manfroce, libretto by Gaetano Rossi; premiered Teatro Valle, Rome, 10 October 1810
- Aldano in Evellina – composed by Carlo Coccia, libretto by Gaetano Rossi; premiered Teatro Re, Milan, 26 December 1814
- Genio dell'Austria in Il mistico omaggio – composed by Vincenzo Federici and Ferdinando Orlandi, libretto by Vincenzo Monti; premiered La Scala, Milan, 15 May 1815 (in the presence of Archduke John of Austria)
- Pietro il Grande in Il falegname di Livonia – composed by Gaetano Donizetti, libretto by Gherardo Bevilacqua Aldobrandini; premiered Teatro San Samuele, Venice, 26 December 1819
- The Caliph in La schiava in Bagdad – composed by Giovanni Pacini, libretto by Vincenzo Pezzi; premiered Teatro Carignano, Turin, 28 October 1820
- Teramene in Fedra – composed by Simon Mayr, libretto by Luigi Romanelli; premiered La Scala, Milan, 26 December 1820
- Manete-Setosi in Emira, regina d'Egitto – composed by Giuseppe Mosca, libretto by N.Cervelli; premiered La Scala, Milan, 6 March 1821
- Tiberio in La sciocca per astuzia – composed by Giuseppe Mosca, libretto by Luigi Romanelli; premiered La Scala, Milan, 15 May 1821
- Gusmano in Elvira e Lucindo – composed by Joseph Hartmann Stuntz, libretto by Luigi Romanelli; premiered La Scala, Milan, 9 June 1821
- Eduardo in Alfredo il Grande – composed by Gaetano Donizetti, libretto by Andrea Leone Tottola; premiered Teatro San Carlo, Naples, 2 July 1823
- Clementi in Il segreto – composed by Luigi Majocchi, libretto by Felice Romani; premiered, Teatro Ducale, Parma, 26 January 1833
- Cedrico in Il templario – composed by Otto Nicolai, libretto by Girolamo Maria Marini; premiered Teatro Regio, Turin, 1 February 1840
