= Antonio Poggi =

Italian operatic tenor (1806–1875)

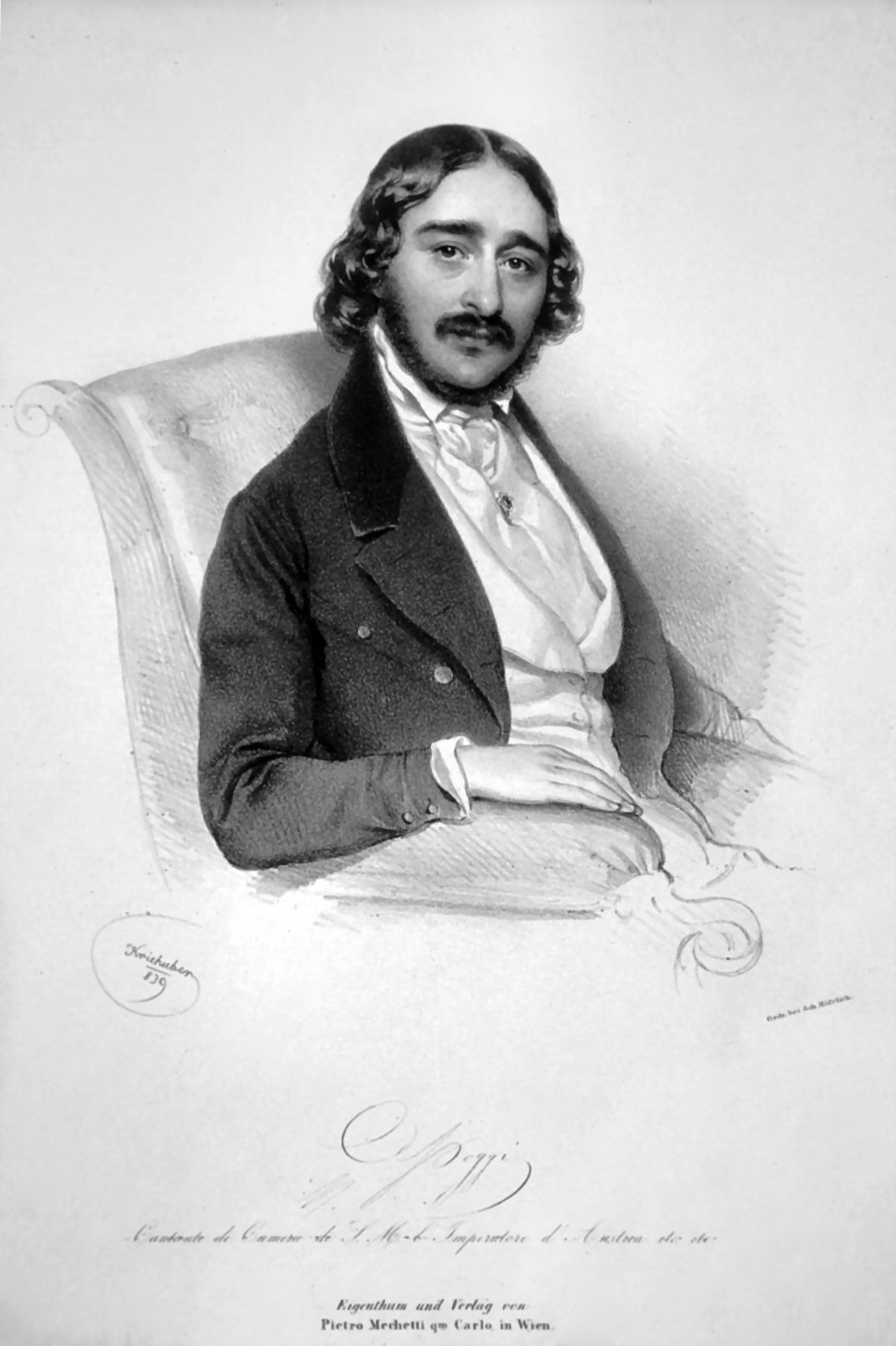
- Antonio Poggi, Lithograph by Josef Kriehuber, 1839

Background information
- Born: 1806; Castel San Pietro Terme
- Died: 15 April 1875 (aged 68–69) Bologna, Italy
- Occupation: Italian operatic tenor
- Years active: 1827–1848

Antonio Poggi (1806 – 15 April 1875) was an Italian operatic tenor who had an active international career from 1827–1848. He is best remembered for creating roles in the world premieres of operas by Gaetano Donizetti and Giuseppe Verdi. He was married to soprano Erminia Frezzolini from 1841–1846.

== Life and career ==
Born in Castel San Pietro Terme in 1806, Poggi studied singing with Andrea Nozzari and the cello with Maestro Coticelli. He made his professional opera debut in 1827 at the Paris Opera as Rodrigo in Gioachino Rossini's La donna del lago; a performance which was not well received. However, on 27 December 1827 he had a major success at the Teatro Comunale di Bologna as Peter I of Russia in Giovanni Pacini's Il falegname di Livronia. This performance launched a major career for Poggi in Italy's most important opera houses.

In 1828 Poggi returned to Bologna where he appeared successfully as Emerico in Carlo Coccia's Clotilde and as Lindoro in Rossini's L'italiana in Algeri. He sang in Bologna again in 1832 during the city's first hearings of Vincenzo Bellini's La straniera (as Arturo) and Saverio Mercadante's I normanni a Parigi (as Odone). In 1829 he was committed to the Regio Teatro degli Avvalorati in Livorno where he was admired as Ramiro in Rossini's La Cenerentola. He appeared in Padua in 1832 in the world premiere of Giuseppe Persiani's Saraceni in Catania. On 9 September 1833 he created the role of Roberto in the first performance of Gaetano Donizetti's Torquato Tasso at the Teatro Valle in Rome.

In 1834 Poggi reached La Scala where he made his début performance as Elvino in Bellini's La sonnambula. He remained there through 1836, notably appearing in the premiere of Lauro Rossi's La casa disabitata and in the roles of Nemorino in Donizetti's L'elisir d'amore and as Lord Arturo Talbo in the Italian premiere of Bellini's I puritani. He was then committed to the Teatro Apollo in Venice in 1836–1837, singing such roles as Don Pedro in Giuseppe Persiani's Ines de Castro, Edgardo in Lucia di Lammermoor, and Bellini's Elvino. At that theatre he also performed the role of Ghino Degli Armieri in the first performance of Donizetti's Pia de' Tolomei on 18 February 1837.

From 1835 to 1840 Poggi appeared periodically at the Theater am Kärntnertor where he was much admired in the operas of Donizetti. In 1842 he sang at Her Majesty's Theatre in London. He then performed the role of Oronte in Giuseppe Verdi's I Lombardi alla prima crociata in both Venice and Florence in 1843, and both Rome and Milan in 1844. On 15 February 1845 he created the role of Carlo VII in the world premiere of Verdi's Giovanna d'Arco with his then wife, Erminia Frezzolini, in the title role. He also appeared at La Scala as Don Ottavio in Wolfgang Amadeus Mozart's Don Giovanni and Orombello in Bellini's Beatrice di Tenda among other roles. His last year of activity in Italy was in Bologna in 1848. Soon after, during a concert tour to Saint Petersburg, Russia, he caught a throat disease which damaged his singing voice and ended his career prematurely. He lived the rest of his life in retirement in Bologna where he died in 1875.
