= Alina, regina di Golconda =

Opera by Gaetano Donizetti

- Opera by Gaetano Donizetti
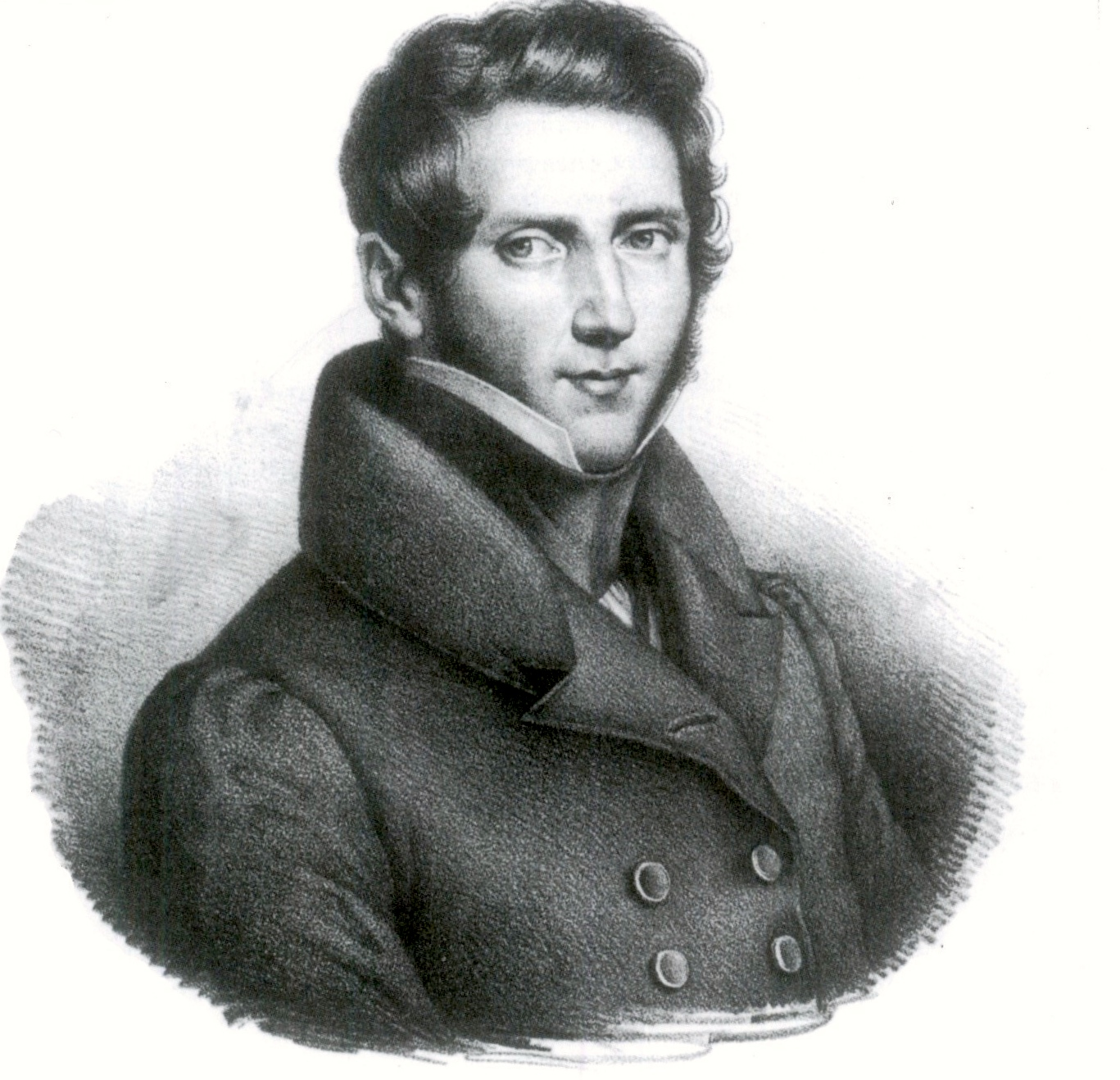
- Donizetti as a young man
- Librettist: Felice Romani
- Language: Italian
- Based on: Novel by Stanislas de Boufflers
- Premiere: 12 May 1828; Teatro Carlo Felice, Genoa

Alina, regina di Golconda (Alina, Queen of Golconda) is an opera in two acts by Gaetano Donizetti. The Italian libretto was written by Felice Romani after Michel-Jean Sedaine's French libretto for Pierre-Alexandre Monsigny's ballet-heroique Aline, reine de Golconde (Paris Opera, 1766), in its turn based on the novel by Stanislas de Boufflers.

The opera was commissioned for the opening festivities of the Teatro Carlo Felice, Genoa, where it premiered with success on 12 May 1828. Soon after, a revised version debuted at the Teatro Valle, Rome on 10 October 1829.

== Roles ==
Role	Voice type	Premiere Cast, 12 May 1828 (Conductor: - )
Alina, shepherd, then Queen of Golconda	soprano	Annetta Fischer
Fiorina	mezzo-soprano	Carolina De Vincenti
Seide	tenor	Giovanni Battista Verger
Volmar	baritone	Antonio Tamburini
Belfiore	buffo	Giuseppe Frezzolini
Hassan	tenor	Antonio Crippa
Cora, one of the Queen's slaves		

== Synopsis ==
Time: "The mythical past"
Place: India

=== Act 1 ===
Alina, a humble country girl, has been captured by pirates and taken to the kingdom of Golconda, where the elderly king falls in love with her, marries her, and shortly dies, leaving Alina a widow and queen. Her subjects urge her to choose another husband, and the noble and handsome Seide emerges as leading candidate. Alina, however, cannot forget a previous lover, Ernesto Volmar, a French army officer; despite this, she is just about to declare her choice when three cannon shots sound and a ship from France arrives. The ambassador is Volmar, who is haunted by the memory of the girl snatched away from him.

Alina is rapturous with joy and excitement. Her feelings are little understood, except by her friend Fiorina, another French girl also kidnapped by pirates. Fiorina left behind her a husband, named Belfiore, whom she incessantly argued with, and does not know whether or not she longs to meet him again or fears such an encounter. By a curious chance, Volmar's aide-de-camp is this same Belfiore.

Alina decides to test Volmar's love: of course, he does not know that she is the queen. Firstly, she lets Volmar hear her voice while she herself is hidden among her slaves. He is stunned and enchanted, but Alina and Fiorina explain that it is quite common for travellers in a strange land to hear voices resembling those of their fatherland. Belfiore has also heard Fiorina's voice, but his reaction is horror. After this, she nominates Volmar as king, but, just as she hoped, he refuses, staying faithful to the memory of the girl he loved. Meanwhile, Seide has easily discovered Alina's love for Volmar and, driven by jealousy, incites his followers to rebel.

=== Act 2 ===
For her final test, Alina reconstructs the garden in Provence in which she and Volmar first met, explaining to him that everything which has happened since has been a dream. At first he is incredulous, but then abandons himself to love. Fiorina decides to put Belfiore through the same test, and tells him that he dreamt of Golconda and all that happened there after a session of heavy drinking. Belfiore recounts his "dream", adding in numerous details of conquests of love.

In the meantime, Seide's revolt has broken out. The two girls are forced to ask the two men for their help, and explain the game that they have played with them. Seide bursts in and confronts Alina. He pleads for her love, but when she refuses hurls her into prison. However, Volmar (who now knows who Alina really is) returns with his Frenchmen to defeat Seide's forces, and restores Alina to the throne. Alina is moved by the love of the people for her, but the opera ends with her singing a passionate love-song to Volmar, (Alina: Eri di notte il sogno, eri il pensier del di).

== Recordings ==
Year	Cast: (Alina, Fiorina, Seide, Volmar)	Conductor, Opera House and Orchestra	Label
1987	Daniela Dessì, Adelisa Tabiadon, Rockwell Blake, Paolo Coni	Antonello Allemandi, Orchestra Sinfonica dell'Emilia Romagna "Arturo Toscanini" and Grupo Giovanile della Cooperativa «Artisti del Coro» del Teatro Regio di Parma (Audio and video recordings made at performances at the Ravenna Festival, 15–17 July)	Audio CD: Nuova Era; Cat: 033.6701, DVD: House of Opera; Cat: DVDCC 136
