= Ester Mombelli =

Italian opera singer (1794 – after 1827)

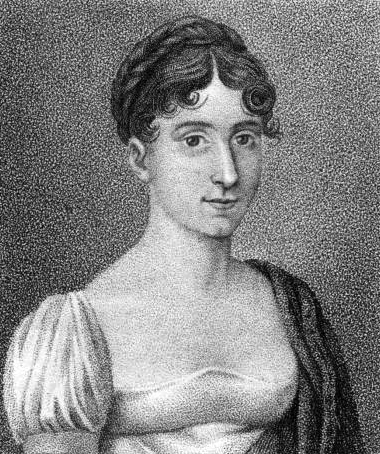
- Born: Maria Ester Mombelli; 1792; Naples, Italy
- Died: after 1827
- Occupation: opera singer
- Relatives: Domenico Mombelli (father); Vincenza Viganò (mother); Anna Mombelli (sister)

Maria Ester Mombelli (1792 – after 1827) (Note: The birth year of 1792 is based on Gillio (2011) in the Dizionario Biografico degli Italiani and Mario Bacella et al. (1999). Domenico Mombelli: cantante e compositore. Some sources such as Mesa (2013) give the birth year as 1794. The latter date appears to be based on Fétis (1840).) was an Italian opera singer particularly known for her performances in operas by Rossini and Donizetti. She sang both soprano and mezzo-soprano roles, and often sang with her younger sister Anna.

== Life and career ==
Mombelli was born in Naples, the eldest of Domenico Mombelli and Vincenza Viganò-Mombelli's twelve children. She was trained in singing by her father, who had been a prominent tenor in the 1780s and '90s. She began performing in Lisbon at a very young age when her father was engaged by the Teatro de São Carlos. There, she appeared in the oratorio La morte di Saule by Gaetano Andreozzi (1804) and the operas Nardone e Nannetta by Francesco Gardi (1806) and Ifigenia in Aulide by Luigi Gianella (1809).

From 1805, the Mombelli family was based in Bologna, although they travelled to Lisbon and various theatres in Italy with their own opera troupe, which included Domenico, Ester, and Ester's younger sister Anna. In Bologna, the Mombelli's befriended the young Rossini who was still a student at the Accademia Filarmonica. Domenico commissioned Rossini to compose the opera Demetrio e Polibio, for which Vincenza had written the libretto. It was to be Rossini's first opera, although not the first to be publicly staged. It was performed privately in Bologna in 1809 and officially premiered in Rome's Teatro Valle on 18 May 1812. On both of those occasions, three of its four roles were sung by Domenico, Ester, and Anna. Mombelli's troupe subsequently took the work to several cities in Italy.

Ester went on to become a distinguished interpreter of Rossini's operas, creating the role of Madame Cortese in his Il viaggio a Reims and singing the title role in La Cenerentola on multiple occasions. Rossini also composed the cantata La morte di Didone expressly for her voice. She sang in its premiere performance at the Teatro San Benedetto in Venice on 2 May 1818. From 1823 to 1825, she appeared at the Théâtre Italien in Paris, where she not only sang in the premiere of Il viaggio a Reims but also sang the title role in La donna del lago in the first Paris performances.

In December 1825, Mombelli returned to Venice, where she sang at La Fenice until February 1826. She appeared as Desdemona in the theatre's first performance of Rossini's Otello and sang in the world premieres of Carafa's Il paria and Mercadante's Erode and Caritea. In 1827, she married Count Camillo Gritti and retired from the stage. Gritti had been the administrator of La Fenice from 1818 to 1825 and in the ensuing years remained an influential figure in the artistic life of Venice.

== Roles created ==
- Lisinga in Rossini's Demetrio e Polibio, Teatro Valle, Rome, 18 May 1812
- Zoraida in Donizetti's Zoraida di Granata, Teatro Argentina, Rome, 28 January 1822
- Gilda in Donizetti's L'ajo nell'imbarazzo, Teatro Valle, Rome, 4 February 1824
- Madame Cortese in Rossini's Il viaggio a Reims, Théâtre Italien, Paris, 19 June 1825
- Marianna in Mercadante's Erode, La Fenice, Venice, 27 December 1825
- Neala in Michele Carafa's Il paria, La Fenice, Venice, 4 February 1826
- Caritea in Mercadante's Caritea, regina di Spagna, La Fenice, Venice, 21 February 1826
