= Caritea, regina di Spagna =

Opera by Saverio Mercadante

Saverio Mercadante

Caritea, regina di Spagna, ossia La morte di Don Alfonso re di Portogallo (Caritea, Queen of Spain, or, The Death of Don Alfonso, King of Portugal), is an opera in two acts by Saverio Mercadante, with a libretto by Paolo Pola. It was premiered at Teatro La Fenice in Venice on 21 February 1826.

== Roles ==
Role	Voice type	Premiere cast 21 February 1826
Caritea, Queen of Spain	soprano	Ester Mombelli
Don Alfonso, King of Portugal	tenor	Domenico Donzelli
Don Diego, a Spaniard	mezzo-soprano	Brigida Lorenzani Nerici
Don Fernando, Don Diego's father	bass	Domenico Cosselli
Don Rodrigo	tenor	Giuseppe Binaghi
Corrado	contralto	Brigida Lorenzani

== Synopsis ==
Time:
Place: Toledo, on the banks of the Tagus River, near Don Alonso's camp.

=== Act 1 ===
Don Alfonso, the king of Portugal, has declared war on Spain; because the Spanish queen Caritea has refused his offer of marriage, he has decided to take the country by force. The Portuguese are laying siege to Toledo. Diego, a Spaniard who is in love with Caritea, arrives at the Portuguese camp, where he asks for entry. He had fled Spain ten years earlier because he had been rejected by the queen and killed another of the queen's suitors, Pompey. Caritea, who had been in love with Pompey, promised to marry anyone who would deliver her Diego's head.

Caritea enters the Portuguese camp, disguised as a man. She has been trying to infiltrate the camp, but is nearly caught and killed, if it were not for Diego. Diego recognizes Caritea, and is still terribly in love with her. Caritea, however, does not recognize Diego, since it has been ten years since his escape.

Don Alfonso then arrives, and frees Don Fernando, Diego's elderly father, who has fallen prisoner. Alfonso is then informed that Caritea has been spotted, disguised, near the camp, and Alfonso explodes with fury.

=== Act 2 ===
Diego offers to take Caritea back to Toledo. He senses that Caritea is falling in love with him, so he proposes marriage to her. Caritea, however, reminds him that she has decreed only to marry the man who brings her the head of Don Diego. Fernando, knowing that his son is that same Diego whom Caritea has vowed to have killed, fears for his son's life.

Don Alfonso, in his fury, challenges Diego to a duel, but is killed. Diego returns to Toledo the champion and praised by the people. Because he managed to kill the enemy of Spain, Don Diego can now reveal his true identity to Caritea. Caritea forgives him and agrees to marry him.

== Recordings ==
- 1995: Giuliano Carella (cond.), Orchestra Internazionale d'Italia Opera and Bratislava Chamber Chorus. Caritea: Nana Gordaze (soprano); Don Alfonso: Jacek Laszczkowski (tenor); Don Diego: Sonia Lee (mezzo-soprano); Don Fernando: Nicolas Rivenq (baritone); Don Rodrigo: Gregory Bonfatti (tenor); Corrado: Ayhan Ustuk (tenor). (Recorded in July 1995 in Martina Franca at the Festival della Valle d'Itria). Nuova Era, Cat: NE 7258/60
