= Giovanni Battista Verger =

Italian opera singer

Giovanni Battista Verger (1796 – after 1844) was an Italian operatic tenor and impresario. He particularly excelled in the operas of Gioachino Rossini and Gaetano Donizetti.

== Biography ==
Born in Rome, Verger studied singing in his native city before making his professional opera debut at the Royal Opera House, Valletta in 1817. At his debut a critic wrote, "Verger tenori sarà uno dei primi d'Italia". He came back to Italy in 1819 to sing at the Teatro San Samuele as Carlo in the premiere of Donizetti's Pietro il grande. From this point on he arose at the great stages of the Italian peninsula, having tremendous success throughout the 1820s and 1830s in roles from both the lyrical and dramatic repertoire. He became known as one of the greatest Rossini interpreters of his day, and Rossini himself greatly valued his voice.

Verger was committed to La Scala from 1824 to 1826, giving lauded performances there in such Rossini roles as Argirio in Tancredi, Torvaldo in Torvaldo e Dorliska, Rodrigo in La donna del lago, and Idreno in Semiramide. Other roles he portrayed at that house included Carlo in Giovanni Pacini's Il barone di Dolsheim, Zepiro in Peter von Winter's Maometto II, Duca di Lavarenne in Giacomo Meyerbeer's Margherita di Anjou, Capellio in Nicola Vaccai's Giulietta e Romeo, and a role in Ferdinando Paër's Camilla. He also participated in the world premieres of Giuseppe Nicolini's Aspasia ed Argide (1824, Diamante), Carlo Evasio Soliva's Elena e Malvina (1824, Enrico), and Michele Carafa's Il Sonnambulo (1824, Ruggiero).

In 1827 Verger sang the title role in the world premiere of Donizetti's Olivo e Pasquale at the Teatro Valle in Rome. In 1828 he was committed to the Teatro Comunale di Bologna where he was heard as Cleomenes in Rossini's Assedio di Corinto and Antenore in Rossini's Zelmira. He also appeared that year as Seide in the world premiere of Donizetti's Alina, regina di Golconda at the Teatro Carlo Felice in Genoa. In 1829 he sang in the world premieres of Carlo Coccia's Rosmonda" and Pietro Generali's Francesca da Rimini, both at La Fenice. In 1832 he portrayed the role of Odone in the premiere of Saverio Mercadante's I normanni a Parigi at the Teatro Regio di Torino.

Verger's stage career began to slow down in the mid-1830s as he became more involved with work as an impresario. He was particularly active in organizing opera performances in Barcelona at the Teatro Principal. His last known stage performance was at that house in 1844 in the title role of the premiere of Josep Piqué i Cerveró's Ernesto, duca di Sicilia.

Verger's second wife was the contralto Amalia Brambilla (1811–80), who came from a famous Italian family of opera singers. From this marriage several children were produced, including the baritone Napoleone Verger and mezzo-soprano Maria Verger, both of whom had significant careers on the stage. He spent his retirement in Palermo.
