= Salvatore Viganò =

Italian composer (1769–1821)

Salvatore Viganò (March 25, 1769 – August 10, 1821) was an Italian choreographer, dancer and composer.

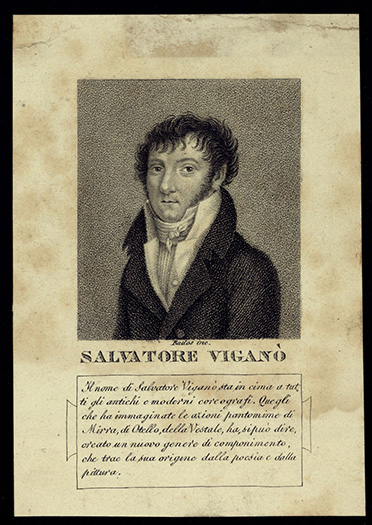
Portrait of Salvatore Viganò, dancer (1769-1821).

Viganò was born in Naples. He studied composition with Luigi Boccherini (his uncle) and by the mid-1780s was composing original music. He produced early dance compositions in Bordeaux and Vienna. In 1788, he appeared as a dancer on the stage in Venice. He performed in the coronation festivities of Charles IV of Spain in 1789. He became a pupil of the French dancer and choreographer Jean Dauberval. In 1791, he and his wife achieved success as a dancing team in Venice, where he choreographed his first ballet, Raoul de Créqui. He was ballet master in Vienna and collaborated with Beethoven on the ballet The Creatures of Prometheus. He returned to Italy in 1804 and became the ballet master of La Scala ballet school in Milan. He is considered the father of a new kind of performance called "coreodramma" where the pantomime served the dance and the ensembles were very significant. He died in Milan.

Viganò's elder sister, Vincenza Viganò-Mombelli was also a dancer and the librettist of Rossini's first opera Demetrio e Polibio.

== Major works ==
- La vedova scoperta, 1783 (opera)
- The Creatures of Prometheus , 1801 (music Ludwig van Beethoven)
- Coriolano, 1804 (music Joseph Weigl)
- Gli Strelizzi, 1809 (various artists)
- Il noce di Benevento, 1812, La Scala (music Franz Xaver Süssmayr)
- Il Prometeo, pantomime ballet, 1813 (music Beethoven, Mozart, Haydn, Viganò)
- Numa Pompilio, 1815
- Mirra, 1817
- Otello, 1818 (various artists, among the others Gioachino Rossini, Paolo Brambilla and Michele Carafa)
- Dedalo, 1818
- La Vestale, 1818 (various artists)
- I Titani, 1819 (music Johann Caspar Aiblinger and Viganò)
- Giovanna d'Arco 1821
- Didone, 1821 (finished by Vigano's brother, Giulio as Salvatore died before completing it)
