= Vincenza Viganò-Mombelli =

- Born: Vincenza Viganò; 1760; Naples, Kingdom of Naples
- Died: 1814
- Other names: Vincenzina Viganò-Mombelli
- Occupations: ballerina; librettist
- Relatives: Domenico Mombelli (husband); Ester Mombelli (daughter); Anna Mombelli (daughter); Salvatore Viganò (brother); Luigi Boccherini (uncle)

Vincenza (or Vincenzina) Viganò-Mombelli (1760–1814) was an Italian ballerina and librettist. She is remembered today as the librettist of Rossini's first opera Demetrio e Polibio. Her husband was the tenor Domenico Mombelli.

== Life and career ==
Viganò-Mombelli was born in Naples to an artistic family. Both her father Onorato Viganò (1739-1811) and her brother Salvatore Viganò were prominent dancers and choreographers. Her mother Maria Ester Boccherini was a ballerina and the sister of composer Luigi Boccherini. In 1791 Vincenza was dancing with Onorato Viganò's company in Venice when she met the recently widowed tenor Domenico Mombelli. They married that same year and went on to have twelve children, three of whom became prominent opera singers: Ester born 1792, Anna born 1795, and Alessandro born 1796 (a tenor like his father). She continued her dancing career for some time after her marriage, appearing in the Teatro San Benedetto in Venice only a few months before the birth of her fourth child in 1798.

Although primarily based in Bologna by 1805, the Mombelli family also travelled from 1806 to 1811 to Lisbon and various theatres in Italy with their own opera company which included their daughters Ester and Anna and the bass Lodovico Olivieri. According to an account in Stendhal's Vie de Rossini, Olivieri was an old friend of Vincenza who not only sang "utility roles" in their company but also served as the family's cook and major domo. It was in Bologna that Vincenza and Domenico made the acquaintance of the young Rossini who was still a student at the Accademia Filarmonica. Vincenza wrote the libretto for Rossini's first opera Demetrio e Polibio. It was premiered privately in 1809 and had its official premiere on 18 May 1812 at Rome's Teatro Valle with three of its four roles sung by Domenico and their daughters Ester and Anna.

Vincenza Viganò-Mombelli died in 1814. Domenico Mombelli married for a third time in 1819.
