= Nicola Antonio Manfroce =

Italian composer (1791–1813)

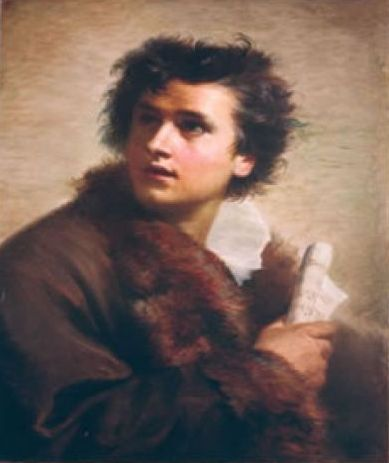
Nicola Antonio Manfroce

Nicola Antonio Manfroce (20 February 1791, in Palmi – 9 July 1813, in Naples) was an Italian composer. His first work was a cantata for Napoleon's birthday, which was performed at the Neapolitan court on 15 August 1809.

== Early life and education ==
Little is known about Manfroce’s early years. He was the son of Carmela Rapillo and Domenico Manfroce, who served as maestro di cappella (chapel master) in Cinquefrondi. Sent to Naples by his father, Nicola pursued humanistic studies at a college and soon showed exceptional musical talent. From 1804, he studied composition at the Pietà dei Turchini Conservatory under Giovanni Furno and Giacomo Tritto.

== Career ==
Manfroce’s first known work was the cantata La nascita di Alcide, composed in honor of Napoleon I and performed in 1809 at the Teatro di San Carlo in Naples for the royal court of Joachim Murat and Caroline Bonaparte.

His early successes encouraged him to move to Rome, where he perfected his counterpoint studies under Nicola Antonio Zingarelli. His first opera, Alzira, premiered in Rome in 1810 at the Teatro Valle.

== Hecuba and final years ==
The celebrated impresario Domenico Barbaja commissioned Manfroce to write a new opera, the three-act tragedy Hecuba. Although already weakened by tuberculosis, the young composer devoted himself intensely to the project, to the detriment of his health.

Hecuba premiered on 13 December 1812 at the Teatro di San Carlo in Naples. The opera was praised for its innovation and dramatic power, and audiences hailed Manfroce as one of the most gifted composers of his generation.

Influenced by French musical style and particularly the tragédie lyrique tradition, Manfroce demonstrated in Hecuba a tragic sensibility comparable to that of Gaspare Spontini’s La vestale. Admirers viewed the work as a Neapolitan counterpart to the French grand opera style.

Despite receiving medical attention ordered by Queen Caroline, Manfroce died on 9 July 1813 at the age of 22, having only just begun work on a new opera, Piramo e Tisbe.

== Style and legacy ==
Later musicologists, including Francesco Florimo (1800–1888), regarded Manfroce as a precursor to Gioachino Rossini for his expressive orchestral writing and development of the so-called “Rossinian crescendo”. Florimo described him as:

One of the first in Naples to study and reflect upon the works of Joseph Haydn and Wolfgang Amadeus Mozart. He was therefore better equipped than Simon Mayr, Ferdinando Paer, or Pietro Generali to unite the sweetness of Italian melody with the structure of German style.

By combining melodic sensitivity with an innovative dramatic temperament akin to French tragédie lyrique, Manfroce became a link between the Neapolitan tradition and broader European Romanticism.

== Works ==
- La nascita di Alcide (1809) – cantata in honor of Napoleon I
- Dixit – choral quartet with orchestra
- A large symphony (lost)
- A bicinium for tenor voices with violin, viola, and bass accompaniment
- Alzira – opera in two acts, libretto by Gaetano Rossi and Jacopo Ferretti; first performed at the Teatro Valle, Rome, 10 October 1810
- Hecuba – opera seria in three acts, libretto by Giovanni Schmidt; first performed at the Teatro di San Carlo, Naples, 13 December 1812
- Piramo e Tisbe – unfinished opera (1813)

== Bibliography ==
- Masutto, Giovanni (1834). I maestri di musica italiani del secolo XIX: notizie biografiche. Venice: G. Cecchini.
- Rusconi, Angelo (2007). "Manfroce, Nicola Antonio". Dizionario Biografico degli Italiani. Vol. 68. Treccani.
- Giannetta, Domenico; Grande, Maria. Nicola Antonio Manfroce e il Decennio francese a Napoli (1806–1815). Palmi: Musicarte, 2024. ISBN 979-12-985059-0-2.
- Borsetta, Maria Paola; Distilo, Massimo; Pugliese, Annunziato. Nicola Antonio Manfroce e la musica a Napoli tra Sette e Ottocento: atti del convegno internazionale di studi. Spilinga: Istituto di bibliografia musicale calabrese, 2014. ISBN 978-88-940404-0-1.

== See also ==
- Giovanni Paisiello
- Gioachino Rossini
