= Giorgio Ronconi =

Italian opera singer (1810–1890)

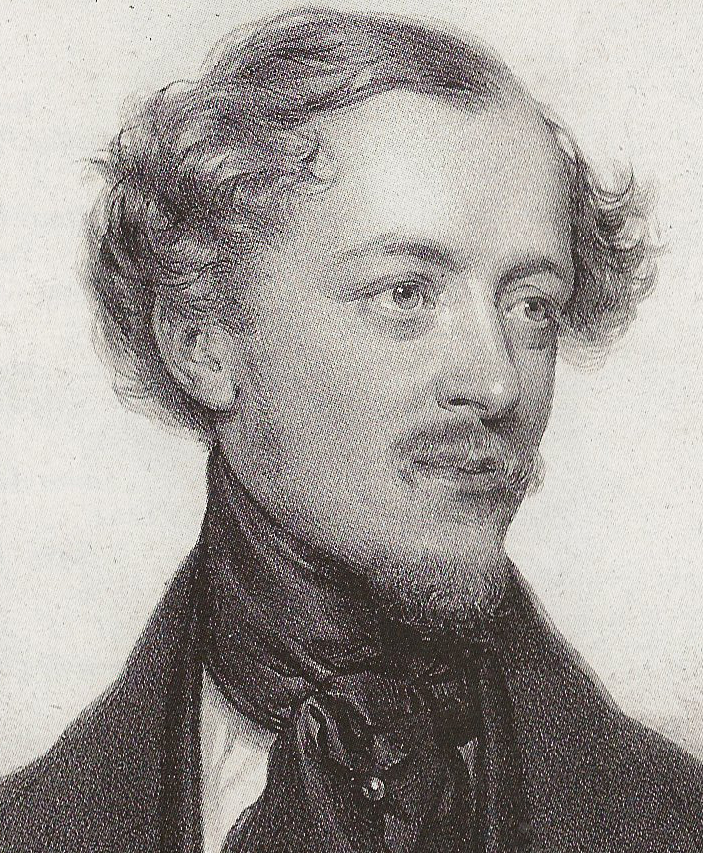
Giorgio Ronconi

Giorgio Ronconi (6 August 1810 – 8 January 1890) was an Italian operatic baritone celebrated for his brilliant acting and compelling stage presence. In 1842, he created the title-role in Giuseppe Verdi's Nabucco at La Scala, Milan.

== Personal life ==
Ronconi was born in Milan and had been taught to sing by his father, Domenico Ronconi, who was a leading tenor.

He married soprano Elguerra Giannoni on 8 October 1837 in Naples, Kingdom of the Two Sicilies. By some accounts, Giannoni had sung with some success at the Lyceum Theatre and at the King's Theatre in London. However, Harold Rosenthal has written: "This lady, who failed on virtually every opera stage in Europe, was considered a good concert-room singer only, but so indispensable was her husband to any Italian company that willy-nilly she had to be engaged as well."

In his later years, Ronconi founded a school of singing at Granada in Spain and also accepted a professorial post at the Madrid Royal Conservatory. Ronconi died in Madrid, aged 79.

== Career in opera ==
He made his operatic debut at Pavia in 1831, as Valdeburgo in Bellini's La straniera, and went on to sing at the Teatro alla Scala and elsewhere in Italy.

In the 1830s and 1840s, he appeared in the first performances of seven operas by Donizetti:

- 1833, as Cardenio in Il furioso all'isola di San Domingo;
- 1833, in the title role in Torquato Tasso;
- 1836, as Enrico in Il campanello;
- 1837, as Nello Dello Pietra in Pia de' Tolomei;
- 1838, as Corrado Waldorf in Maria de Rudenz;
- 1841, as Don Pedro in Maria Padilla; and
- 1843, as Enrico, Duke of Chevreuse, in Maria di Rohan.

In 1842, Ronconi appeared for the first time in London, at Her Majesty's Theatre, performing the part of Henry Ashton in Donizetti's Lucia di Lammermoor. Ronconi's success with audiences outside Italy was immediate, and he continued to be one of the most popular and influential operatic artists in Europe until the early 1870s, when he retired. For instance, from 1847 until 1866, he appeared at London's Theatre Royal, Covent Garden, in the second and third of the three theatres on that site (now known as the Royal Opera House). Vienna heard him in 1843, and he sang in St Petersburg between 1850 and 1860 and in New York City from 1866 to 1872.

== Assessment and legacy ==
The Encyclopædia Britannica Eleventh Edition offers the following assessment of Ronconi:

His voice was neither extensive in compass nor fine in quality, but the genius of his acting and the strength of his personality atoned for his vocal defects. He was equally at home in comedy and tragedy, and the two parts by which he is best remembered, Rigoletto and Figaro, show conclusively the range of his talent.

The two roles cited are the title character in Giuseppe Verdi's Rigoletto and the central character of Gioachino Rossini's The Barber of Seville.

A large section is devoted to descriptions of Ronconi's powers in the critic Henry Fothergill Chorley's Recollections of 1862.

Another celebrated 19th-century baritone, Sir Charles Santley, recorded in his 1892 memoirs the following anecdote about Ronconi:

The word libertà ("freedom") was expunged from the Italian stage-vocabulary by the [occupying] Austrians. Singing in the duet "Suoni la tromba" in I Puritani on one occasion, Ronconi gave the words gridando libertà ("crying Liberty!") with such vigour and emphasis that the audience was excited to the pitch of frenzy, and a great commotion ensued. Next morning he received a reprimand for using the prohibited word, accompanied by a request to use the word lealtà ("loyalty") on future occasions in its stead. Shortly after, playing Il Sergente in L'elisir d'amore and in deference to the request for him to substitute perdè la liberta ("lost his freedom") with perdè la lealtà ("lost his loyalty"), the result was received with shrieks of laughter by the audience, to the great discomfiture of the advocates of "loyalty".

Ronconi instigated a long line of great Italian baritones that continued into modern times. But the most esteemed of his contemporaries and immediate successors were probably Felice Varesi, Leone Giraldoni, Francesco Graziani and Antonio Cotogni, all of whom were chosen by Verdi himself to create or premiere his baritone roles.
