= Giovanna d'Arco =

1845 opera by Giuseppe Verdi

- Opera by Giuseppe Verdi
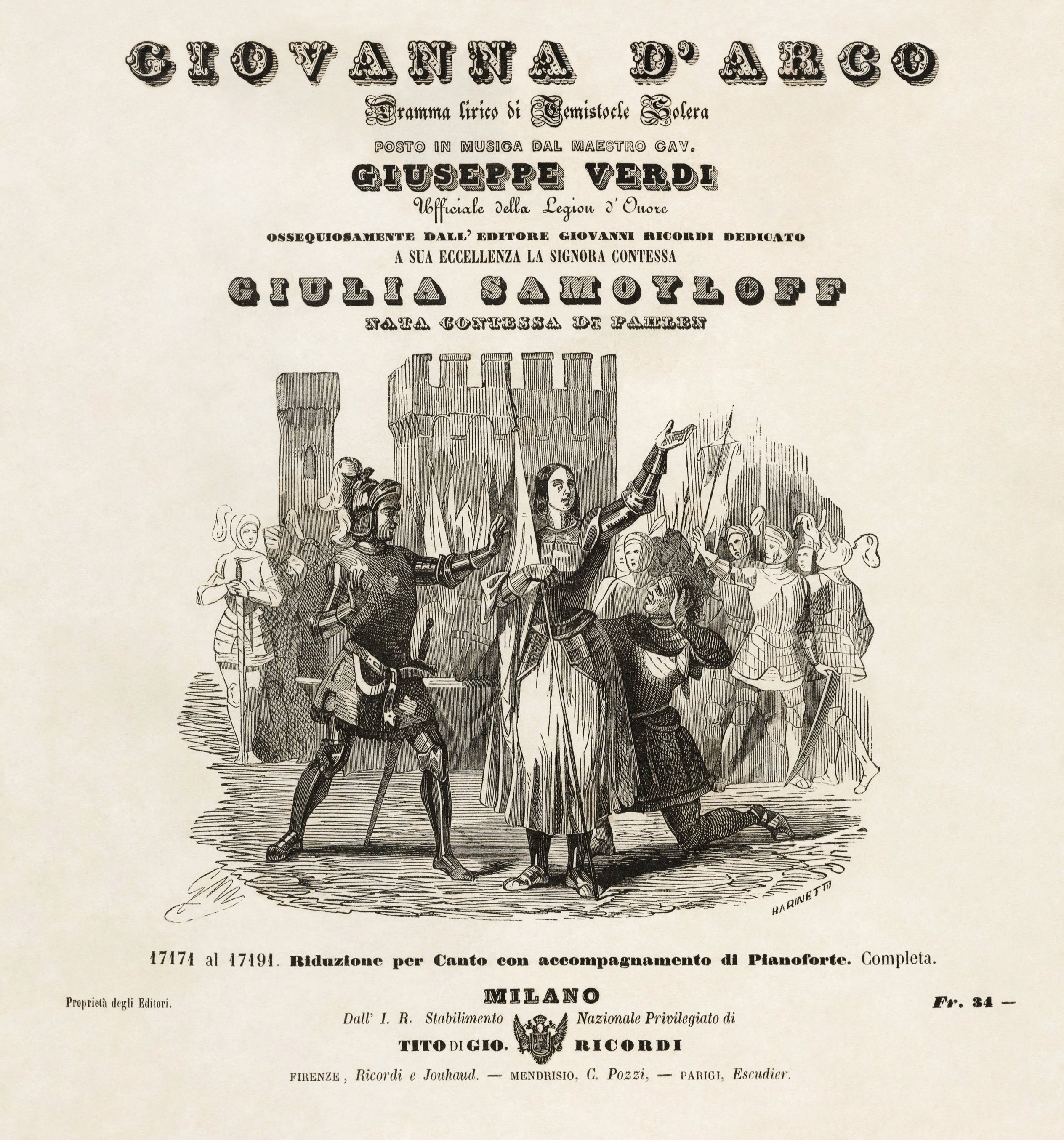
- Title page of a variant of the first edition vocal score
- Librettist: Temistocle Solera
- Language: Italian
- Based on: Schiller's play Die Jungfrau von Orleans
- Premiere: 15 February 1845; Teatro alla Scala, Milan

Giovanna d'Arco (Joan of Arc) is an operatic dramma lirico with a prologue and three acts by Giuseppe Verdi set to an Italian libretto by Temistocle Solera, who had prepared the libretti for Nabucco and I Lombardi. It is Verdi's seventh opera.

The work partly reflects the story of Joan of Arc and appears to be loosely based on the 1801 play Die Jungfrau von Orleans by Friedrich von Schiller. Verdi wrote the music during the autumn and winter of 1844/45 and the opera had its first performance at Teatro alla Scala in Milan on 15 February 1845.

This opera is not to be confused with Rossini's cantata of the same name, which was composed in 1832 for contralto and piano, and runs approximately 15 minutes.

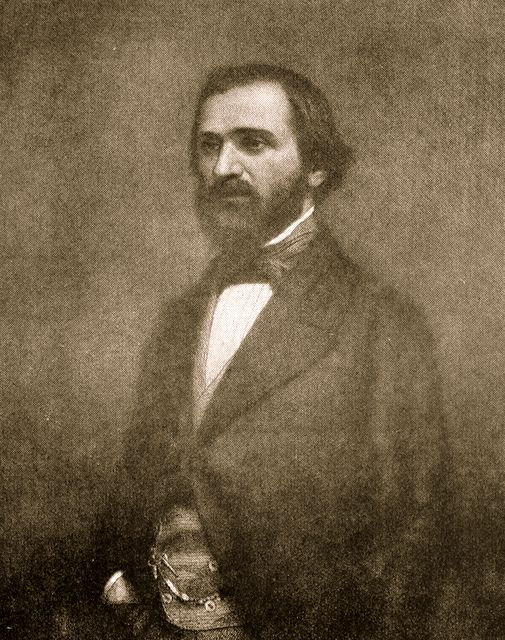
Giuseppe Verdi

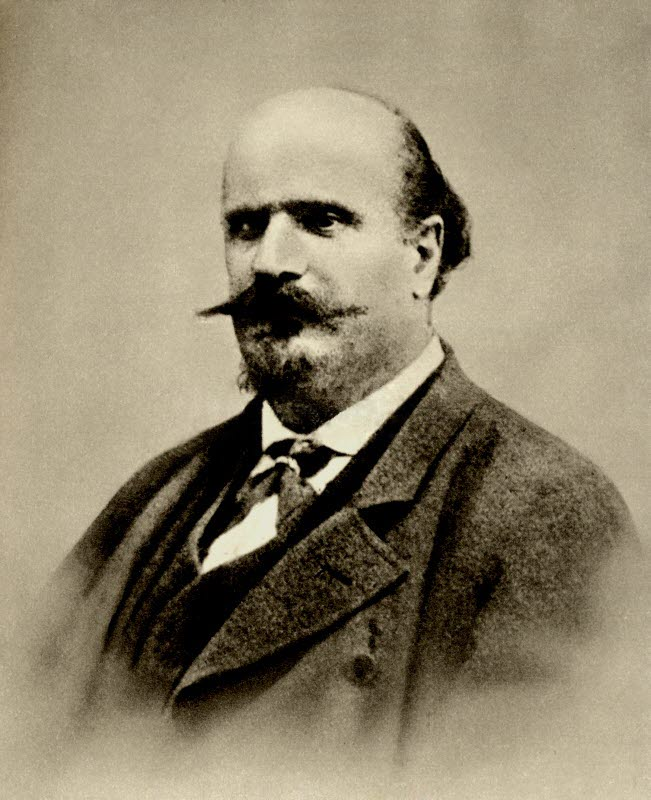
Temistocle Solera, librettist

== Libretto ==
By the middle of the 19th century, the story of Joan of Arc had served as the basis for many operas, including those of Nicola Vaccai (1827) and Giovanni Pacini (1830), both of which were strongly reminiscent of Schiller's play. Solera was asked by Verdi's publisher, Giovanni Ricordi, for assurances that his libretto violated no copyright, noting that he had heard of a French treatment of the subject. Solera denied that Schiller's play was the source of his work and wrote that the work was "an entirely original Italian drama […] I have not allowed myself to be imposed upon by the authority either of Schiller or Shakespeare […] My play is original" (emphasis in original). Musicologist Julian Budden believes that "invention was not Solera's strong suit" and describes Solera's work as "merely Schiller diluted". He criticized the flow of the libretto compared to the play, writing that "characters are reduced to a minimum" and "for poetry and humanity we are given theatrical sensationalism".

== Performance history ==
=== 19th century ===
The first Giovanna was Erminia Frezzolini, who had previously appeared in Verdi's I Lombardi alla prima crociata two years earlier. She was paired with her husband, tenor Antonio Poggi, as Charles, King of France. Baritone Filippo Colini portrayed Giovanna's father Giacomo. Verdi himself thought highly of the opera but was unhappy with the way it was staged and "with the deteriorating standards of Merelli's productions" overall. Due to Merelli's underhand negotiations to acquire the rights to the score from Ricordi, the composer vowed never to deal with the impresario nor set foot on the stage of La Scala again. La Scala did not stage another Verdi premiere until the revised version of Simon Boccanegra 36 years later.

While the critics were rather dismissive of the opera, it was "ecstatically received" by audiences. and was given a respectable 17 performances.

For the opera's first production in Rome, three months after the Milan premiere, the papal censor required that the plot be cleared of any direct religious connotations. The title was changed to Orietta di Lesbo, the setting was shifted to the Greek island and the heroine, now of Genoese descent, became a leader of the Lesbians against the Turks. Performances under this title were also given in Palermo in 1847.

For the next 20 years Giovanna d'Arco had steady success in Italy, with stagings in Florence, Lucca, and Senigallia in 1845, Turin and Venice in 1846, Mantua in 1848, and Milan in 1851, 1858, and 1865. It was also presented elsewhere in Europe, Over the course of the nineteenth century, stagings declined to a very few.

=== 20th and 21st centuries ===
In 1951 Renata Tebaldi sang the title role in Naples, Milan (a studio-recorded broadcast) and Paris, in a tour that led to further revivals. The US premiere was given in March 1966, in a concert performance at Carnegie Hall, New York, with Teresa Stratas in the title role. Its first stage performance in the US was given in 1976 by Vincent La Selva at the Brooklyn Academy of Music. It received its UK premiere at the Royal Academy of Music in London on 23 May 1966.

Fully staged productions were mounted by the San Diego Opera in June 1980 as part of its short-lived "Verdi Festival", and by The Royal Opera, London, in June 1996 with Vladimir Chernov as Giacomo and June Anderson as Giovanna.

Musicians from the Lewis & Clark College performed Orietta di Lesbo in March 2006, and again in June at the Aegean Verdi Festival in Mytilene, Lesbos.

The Sarasota Opera mounted the opera in March 2010 with Victor DeRenzi conducting all six performances as part of their "Verdi Cycle."

In September 2013, Chicago Opera Theater staged performances of the opera.

La Scala, Milan, presented the opera for the first time in 150 years in 2015 in a new production with Anna Netrebko in the title role. The Berliner Operngruppe under Felix Krieger presented the opera in March 2018 at Konzerthaus Berlin.

== Roles ==
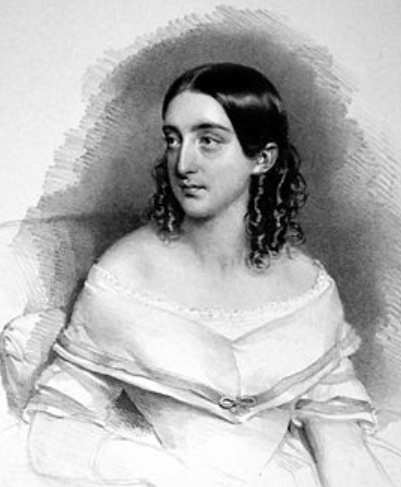
Erminia Frezzolini, the first Giovanna

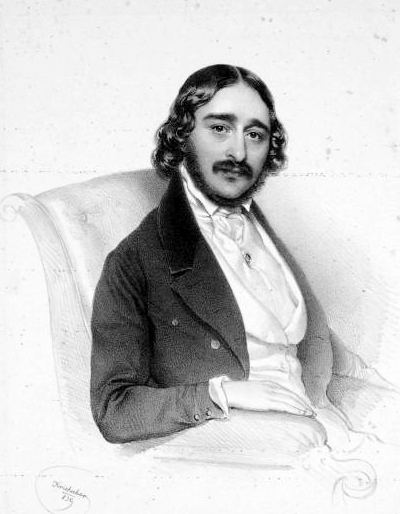
Antonio Poggi who sang the role of Charles VII

Roles, voice types, premiere cast
Role	Voice type	Premiere cast, 15 February 1845 Conductor: Eugenio Cavallini
Giovanna	soprano	Erminia Frezzolini
Carlo VII, King of France	tenor	Antonio Poggi
Giacomo, shepherd and father of Giovanna	baritone	Filippo Colini
Talbot, an English Commander	bass	Francesco Lodetti
Delil, a French officer	tenor	Napoleone Marconi
French and English soldiers, French courtiers, villagers, nobles, angels, demons – Chorus

== Synopsis ==
Time: 1429
Place: Domrémy, Reims and near Rouen, France

=== Prologue ===
Scene 1: The French village of Domrémy

Charles (the not-yet-crowned King of France) describes to his officers and the villagers his vision of the Virgin Mary commanding him to surrender to the invading English army and laying down his weapons at the foot of a giant oak tree. (Aria: Sotto una quercia parvemi – "Beneath an oak she appeared to me"). Later, he expresses his frustration with the limitations of being a ruler. (Aria: Pondo è letal, martirio – "A deadly burden, a torment").

Scene 2: A forest

By a giant oak tree, Giacomo prays for the safety of his daughter Giovanna, who before she falls asleep by a nearby shrine offers prayers to be chosen to lead the French forces. (Aria: Sempre all'alba ed alla sera – "always at dawn and in the evening"). Suddenly, Charles arrives, prepared to lay down his arms at the base of the tree. Meanwhile, the sleeping Giovanna has visions in which angels ask her to become a soldier and lead France to victory (Tu sei bella). She cries out that she is ready to do so. Charles overhears her and thrills at her courage. Her father Giacomo weeps, believing that his daughter has given her soul to the devil out of her devotion to the future king.

=== Act 1 ===
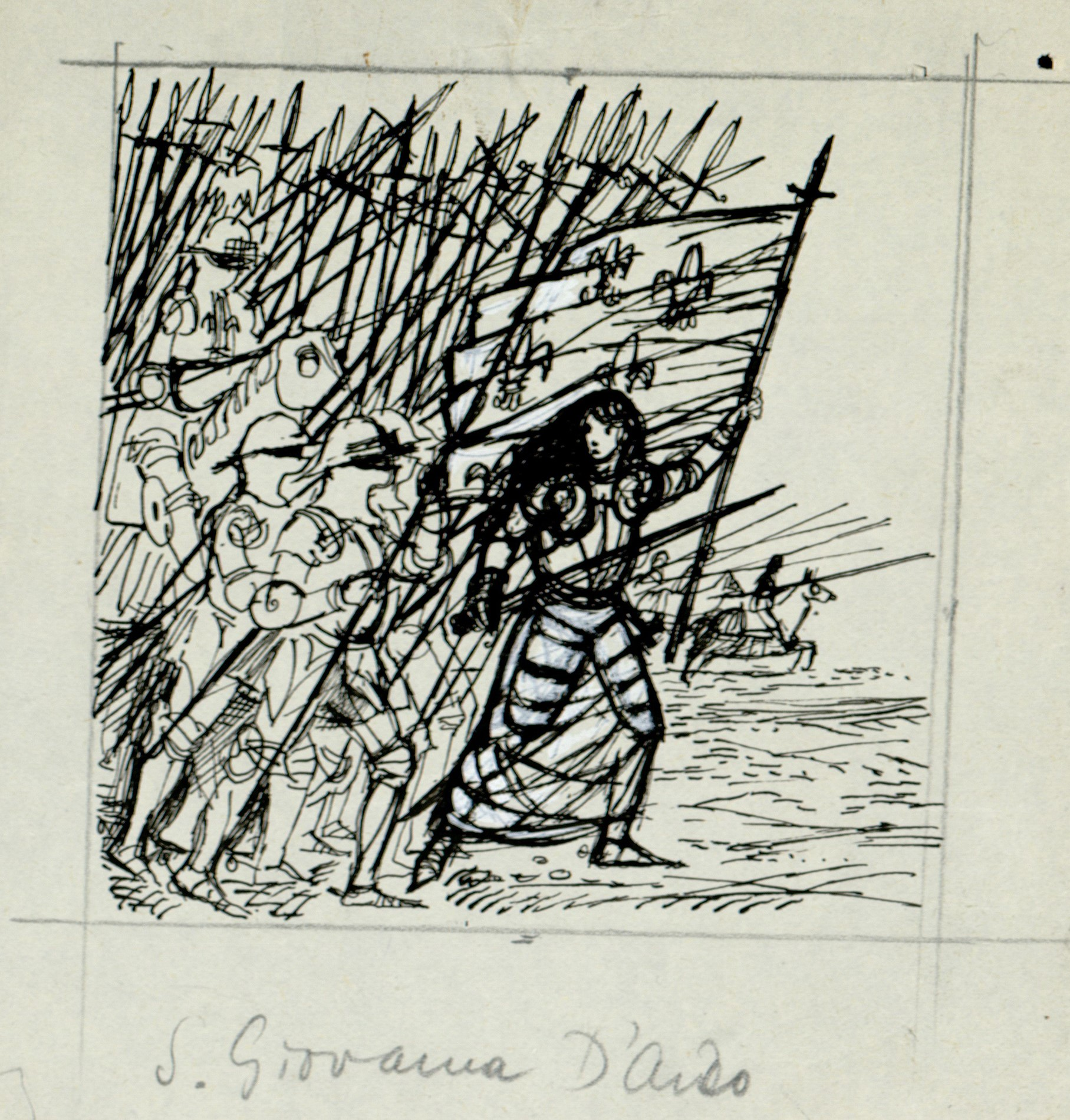
Cover design for libretto

Scene 1: Near Reims

Commander Talbot of the English army tries to convince his discouraged soldiers that their imminent surrender to the French is not due to forces of evil. Giacomo arrives and offers up his daughter, believing her to be under the influence of the devil: Franco son io ("I am French, but in my heart…") and So che per via dei triboli ("I know that original sin").

Scene 2: The French court at Reims

Preparations are under way for Charles' coronation. Giovanna longs for her simple life back home. (Aria: O fatidica foresta – "O prophetic forest"). Charles confesses his love for Giovanna. She withdraws despite her feelings toward the king, because her voices have warned her against earthly love. Charles is taken to Reims Cathedral for his coronation.

=== Act 2 ===
The Cathedral square

The villagers of Reims have gathered in the cathedral square to celebrate Giovanna's victory over the English army. The French soldiers lead Charles into the cathedral. Giacomo has decided he must repudiate his daughter who, he believes, has entered a pact with the devil. (Aria: Speme al vecchio era una figlia – "An old man's hope was a daughter"). He denounces her to the villagers (Aria: Comparire il ciel m'ha stretto – "Heaven has forced me to appear") and they are persuaded, although the King refuses to listen. Charles pleads with Giovanna to defend herself, but she refuses.

=== Act 3 ===
At the stake

Giovanna has been captured by the English army and is awaiting her death at the stake. She has visions of battlefield victories and begs God to stand by her, explaining how she has shown her obedience by forsaking her worldly love for the King as the voices had commanded. Giacomo overhears her pleas and recognizes his error. He loosens his daughter's bonds and she escapes. She rushes to the battlefield to turn the French defeat into victory once more.

Giacomo pleads with the King, first for punishment and then for forgiveness, which Charles grants. Charles learns of the French victory on the battlefield but also of Giovanna's death. (Aria: Quale al più fido amico – "Which of my truest friends"). As her body is carried in, Giovanna suddenly revives. Giacomo reclaims his daughter, and the King professes his love. The angels sing of salvation and victory, as Giovanna dies and ascends into heaven.

== Orchestration ==
Giovanna d'Arco is scored for piccolo (briefly doubling second flute), flute, two oboes (second doubling cor anglais), two clarinets, two bassoons, four horns, two trumpets, six or nine offstage trumpets, three trombones, cimbasso, timpani, snare drum, bass drum and cymbals (cassa), cymbals (piatti), triangle, bell, cannon, wind band, wind band of brass instruments only, offstage band, bass drum for band, harp, harmonium, strings.

== Music ==
Overture
Played in 1991 by the U.S. Marine Band

Few scholars regard the quality of the music very highly. David Kimball writes: "For modern ears no opera illustrates more disconcertingly than Giovanna d'Arco the chasm between Verdi's best and worst music." He praises some of the solo and ensemble music, but finds that the choruses "embody 19th century taste at its most abysmal". Roger Parker says that the musical emphasis was on Joan herself and includes some "powerfully original ensembles", but says that the choruses were "probably intended as a sequel to the grand choral tableau works Verdi and Solera had previously created together."

Gabriele Baldini's assessment is mixed. He endorses Massimo Mila's view that the opera demonstrates "that way of making a hedonistic and vacuously melodious opera which was the norm in contemporary Italian theatres". Baldini found merit in Giovanna's cavatina in the Prologue where she prays to be chosen to lead the forces: Sempre all'alba ed alla sera ("always at dawn and in the evening"). Budden also calls it a work of "brilliant patches", says that "the best things in it surpass anything that Verdi had written up to that time", and finds the soprano part to be of "rare distinction" and the solo numbers and many of the ensembles to be of "high caliber".

== Recordings ==
Several recordings of live performances of Giovanna d'Arco have been released. The only studio recording dates from 1972 and features James Levine conducting with Montserrat Caballé, Plácido Domingo, and Sherrill Milnes. Domingo sang the tenor role of Carlo on that recording and the baritone role of Giacomo in a live performance recorded in 2013 with Anna Netrebko.

Year	Cast (Giovanna, Carlo VII, Giacomo)	Conductor, opera house and orchestra	Label
1951	Renata Tebaldi, Carlo Bergonzi, Rolando Panerai	Alfredo Simonetto, RAI Milano Symphonic Orchestra and Chorus	Audio CD: Melodram; Cat: 27021
1972	Montserrat Caballé, Plácido Domingo, Sherrill Milnes	James Levine, London Symphony Orchestra, Ambrosian Opera Chorus	Audio CD: EMI Classics; Cat: 7-63226-2
1989	Susan Dunn, Vincenzo La Scola, Renato Bruson	Riccardo Chailly, Teatro Comunale di Bologna Orchestra and Chorus. (Staged and directed by German film maker Werner Herzog)	DVD: Kultur; Cat: D4043
2008	Svetla Vassileva, Evan Bowers, Renato Bruson	Bruno Bartoletti, Teatro Regio di Parma	DVD:C Major; Cat:721208
2013	Anna Netrebko, Francesco Meli, Plácido Domingo	Paolo Carignani, Münchner Rundfunkorchester, Philharmonia Chor Wien	Audio CD: Deutsche Grammophon; Cat: 4792712
2016	Jessica Pratt, Jean-François Borras, Julian Kim	Riccardo Frizza, Orchestra Internazionale d'Italia; Chorus of Teatro Petruzzelli Bari; Festival della Valle d'Itria, Martina Franca	Audio CD and DVD: Dynamic; Cat: 8007144376765
