= Il falegname di Livonia =

Opera by Gaetano Donizetti

- Opera buffa by Gaetano Donizetti
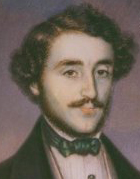
- Donizetti as a young man
- Librettist: Gherardo Bevilacqua-Aldobrandini
- Language: Italian
- Based on: Alexandre Duval's Le menuisier de Livonie
- Premiere: 26 December 1819; Teatro San Samuele in Venice

Il falegname di Livonia, o Pietro il grande, czar delle Russie (The Livonian Carpenter, or Peter the Great, Tsar of the Russias) is an 1819 opera buffa in two acts with music by Gaetano Donizetti set to a libretto by Gherardo Bevilacqua-Aldobrandini. The libretto was based in part on Felice Romani's libretto for Giovanni Pacini's opera Il falegname di Livonia, which had just been presented at La Scala in Milan on 12 April 1819. Another source was Alexandre Duval's comedy Le menuisier de Livonie, ou Les illustres voyageurs (1805).

Donizetti's Il falegname di Livonia was premiered on 26 December 1819 at the opening of the 1819/1820 Carnival season at the Teatro San Samuele in Venice. It was the fourth of Donizetti's operas to be performed during his lifetime and the first to achieve "more than one production". It had about seven stagings until 1827, when its last known performance in the 19th century took place.

== Performance history ==
The opera was neglected until 2003 when it was given a performance in Saint Petersburg, thanks to the artistic director of the St Petersburg Chamber Opera, Yuri Alexandrov, who spent three years in search of the score for the opera, which, so it appeared, had been lost forever. The painstaking work yielded results: the score was restored fragment by fragment. The Russian premiere took place on 27 May 2003 at the Saint Petersburg Chamber Opera, with staging by Yuri Alexandrov and the Russian and Italian versions of the libretto by Yuri Dimitrin.

In 2004, the opera was presented by the Festival della Valle d'Itria in Martina Franca; those performances were recorded.

== Roles ==
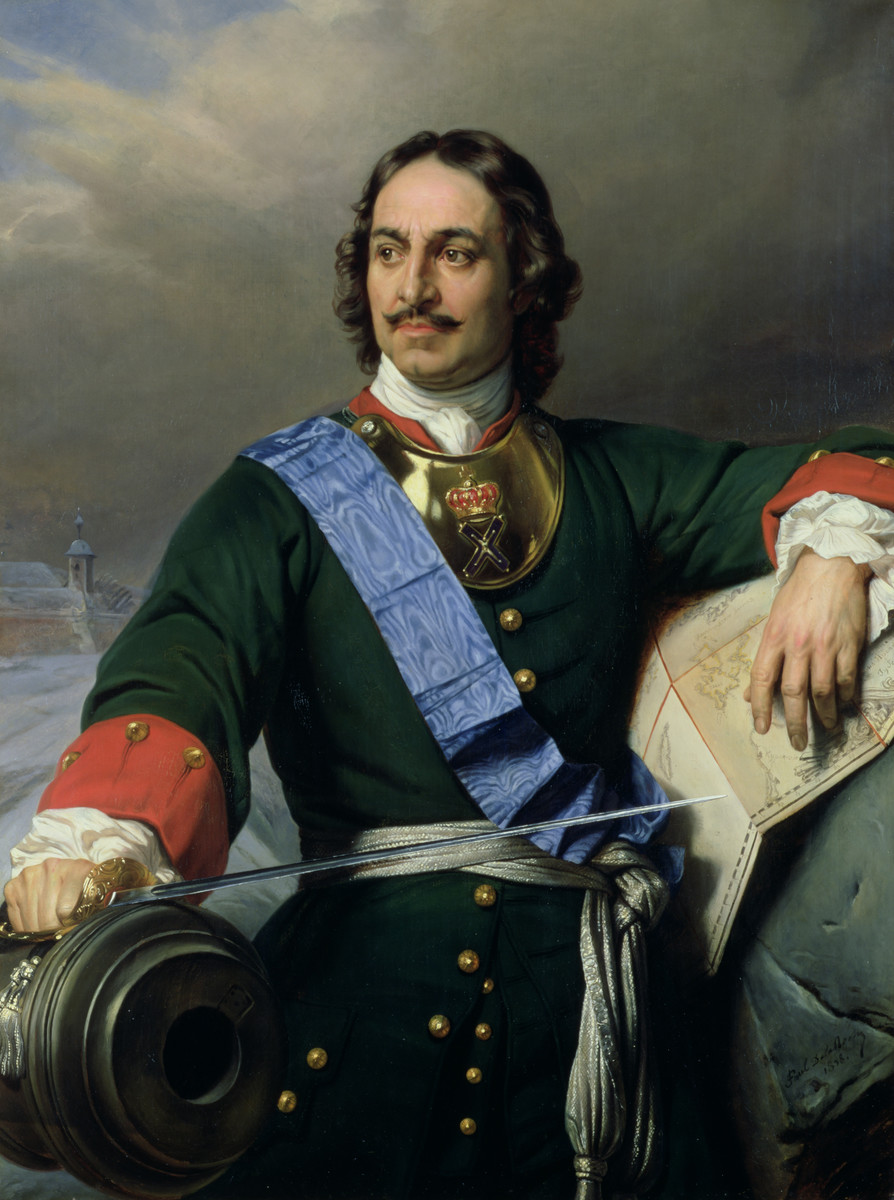
Portrait of Peter the Great by Paul Delaroche

Roles, voice types, premiere cast
Role	Voice type	Premiere cast, 26 December 1819
Pietro il Grande (Peter the Great)	bass	Pio Botticelli
Caterina (Catherine I of Russia, his wife)	soprano	Adelaide Raffi
Madama Fritz, innkeeper	mezzo-soprano	Caterina Amati
Annetta Mazepa, innkeeper	soprano	Angela Bertozzi
Carlo Scavronski, carpenter of Livonia	tenor	Giovanni Battista Verger
Ser Cuccupis, magistrate	bass	Luigi Martinelli
Firman Trombest, in the role of the usurer	bass	Giuseppe Guglielmini
Hondediski, muscovite captain	baritone	Gaetano Rambaldi
Mayors, couriers, followers of the Czar

== Synopsis ==
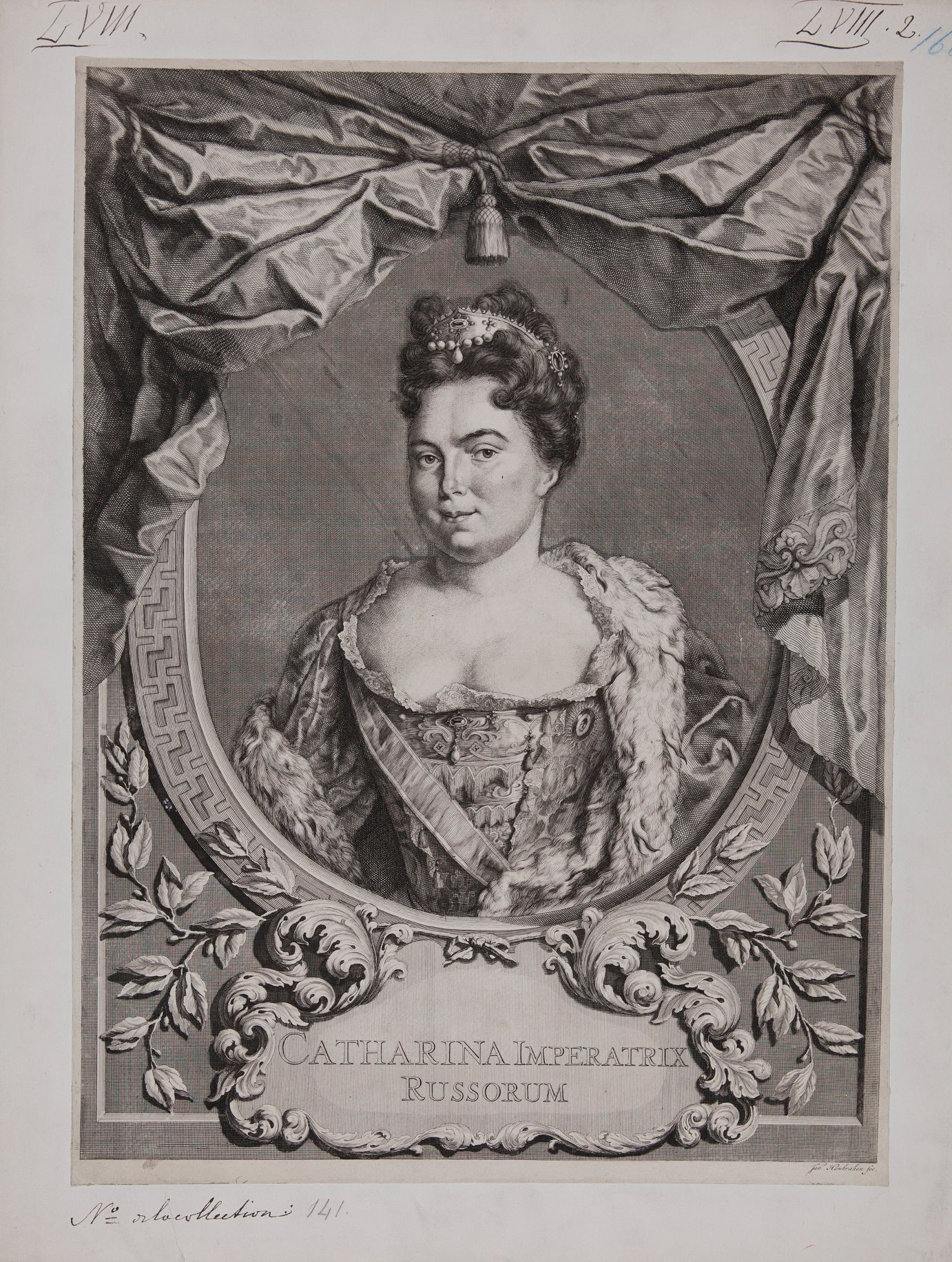
Ekaterina I, Empress and Autocrat of all the Russias, originally named Marta Skavronska

Time: Late 17th century
Place: The Baltic State of Livonia (now Latvia and Estonia) in an unnamed town under Russian rule.

=== Act 1 ===
Carlo, a carpenter, is in love with the orphan Annetta. He claims to be of noble origin and shows that he has a bit of a temper when the tsar and his wife, Catherine, arrive, both travelling incognito. They are looking for the tsarina's lost brother, and have reason to suspect that it might be Carlo. The tsar asks the hotelier, Madame Fritz, about this carpenter. When Carlo enters, he does not know who the strangers are and he is rather insolent. An argument ensues, with Peter threatening Carlo with dire consequences. The town magistrate, Ser Cuccupis, also gets into an argument with Peter. This magistrate has pretensions of grandeur and goes so far as to threaten him with his friend, the tsar. Peter decides to pull rank on the magistrate, and tells him that he is Menshikov, a high officer of the tsar. The magistrate has Carlo imprisoned, and he is about to be convicted when Madame Fritz runs in with some documents proving that he is Catherine's brother.

=== Act 2 ===
When Carlo becomes aware that he is the tsar's brother-in-law, he introduces Annetta to the imperial couple. Again, not knowing the true identity of the couple, he warns them that the tsar must never see her because she is the daughter of the traitor hetman Ivan Mazepa. When told that Mazepa is dead, the false Menshikov pardons the girl. Then the captain of the troops tells the magistrate that Menshikov is actually the tsar. Hoping that this would be an opportunity to advance himself, the magistrate tries to intervene, but since the tsar has already recognized him for what he is, he is fired from his position of authority and is ordered to pay a fine. Peter, Catherine, Carlo and Annetta leave happily for St Petersburg.

== Recordings ==
Year	Cast: Pietro il Grande, Caterina, Madame Fritz, Annetta, Carlo	Conductor, opera house and orchestra	Label
2004	Vito Priante; Eufemia Tafuro, Rosa Anna Peraino, Rosa Sorice, Alessandro Codeluppi	Marco Berdondini, Orchestra Internazionale d’Italia and the Coro da Camera di Bratislava (Recorded at performances in the Atrio di Palazzo Ducale, Martina Franca as part of the Festival della Valle d'Itria. There were performances on 27, 28 July)	CD: Dynamic; Cat: CDS 473-1/2

Note: The act 2 sextet is included in A Hundred Years of Italian Opera, 1810–1820 (Opera Rara; Cat: ORCH103).
