= Olivo e Pasquale =

Opera by Gaetano Donizetti

- Opera by Gaetano Donizetti
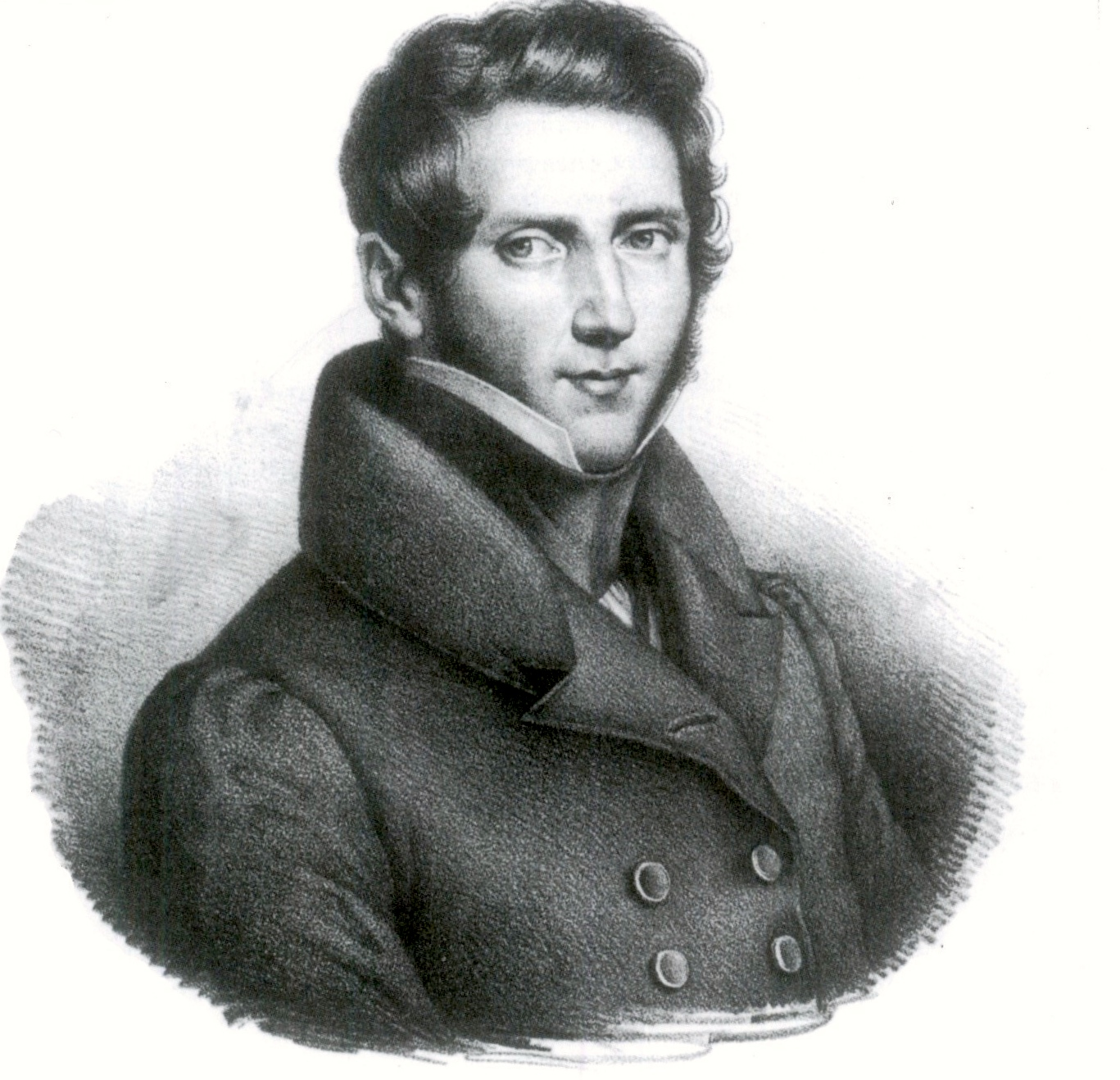
- The young composer
- Librettist: Jacopo Ferretti
- Language: Italian
- Based on: Antonio Simeone Sografi's play
- Premiere: 27 January 1827; Teatro Valle, Rome

Olivo e Pasquale (Olivo and Pasquale) is a melodramma giocoso, a romantic comedy opera, in two acts by Gaetano Donizetti. Jacopo Ferretti wrote the Italian libretto after Antonio Simeone Sografi's play.

== Performance history ==
It premiered on 7 January 1827 at the Teatro Valle, Rome. Donizetti made some revisions in a subsequent production in Naples for the Teatro Nuovo in September 1827, the most important of which was changing Camillo to a tenor.

== Roles ==
Role	Voice type	Premiere Cast, 7 January 1827 (Conductor: - )
Olivo	baritone	Domenico Cosselli
Pasquale	bass	Giuseppe Frezzolini
Isabella, daughter of Olivo	soprano	Emilia Bonini
Camillo	contralto	Anna Scudellari Cosselli
Matilde, Isabella's maid	mezzo-soprano	Agnese Loyselet
Monsieur le Bross, merchant of Cadice	tenor	Giovanni Battista Verger
Columella, a poor traveller	buffo	Luigi Garofalo
Diego, servant in the house of two siblings	baritone	Stanislao Prò
Waiters, servants, young people

== Synopsis ==
Time: The eighteenth century
Place: Lisbon

Olivo and Pasquale are two brothers, both merchants from Lisbon: the first is hot-blooded and brutal, the other is sweet and shy. Olivo's daughter, Isabella, loves a young apprentice, Camillo, but her father wants her to marry a wealthy merchant from Cadiz, Le Bross. Isabella tells Le Bross that she loves another. At first he is led to believe that it is Columella, an old conceited and ridiculous man, but shortly after he understands that it is Camillo. Olivo, realizing that his daughter dares to oppose his will, is furious and Le Bross, shocked by his disproportionate reaction, becomes Isabella and Camillo's ally and promises to help them get married. The lovers threaten to commit suicide at five o'clock if Olivo doesn't agree to let the marriage take place, but he does not believe them and he refuses to be blackmailed. However, at five o'clock, shots of a firearm ring out: Pasquale faints and Olivo says that now he would have preferred Isabella to be Camillo's wife rather than be dead. The threat of suicide was not true, and the young couple appears at the door; Olivo embraces and blesses their union.

== Recordings ==
Year	Cast (Olivo, Pasquale, Isabella, Camillo)	Conductor, Opera House and Orchestra	Label
1980	John Del Carlo, Gastone Sarti, Estelle Maria Gibbs, Sabrina Bizzo	Bruno Rigacci, Orchestra Giovanile International di Opera Barga (Recording of a performance in the Teatro Dei Differenti, Barga, 27 July)	Audio CD: Bongiovanni; Cat: GB 2005/6-2
