= Giuseppe Frezzolini =

Italian opera singer (1789–1861)

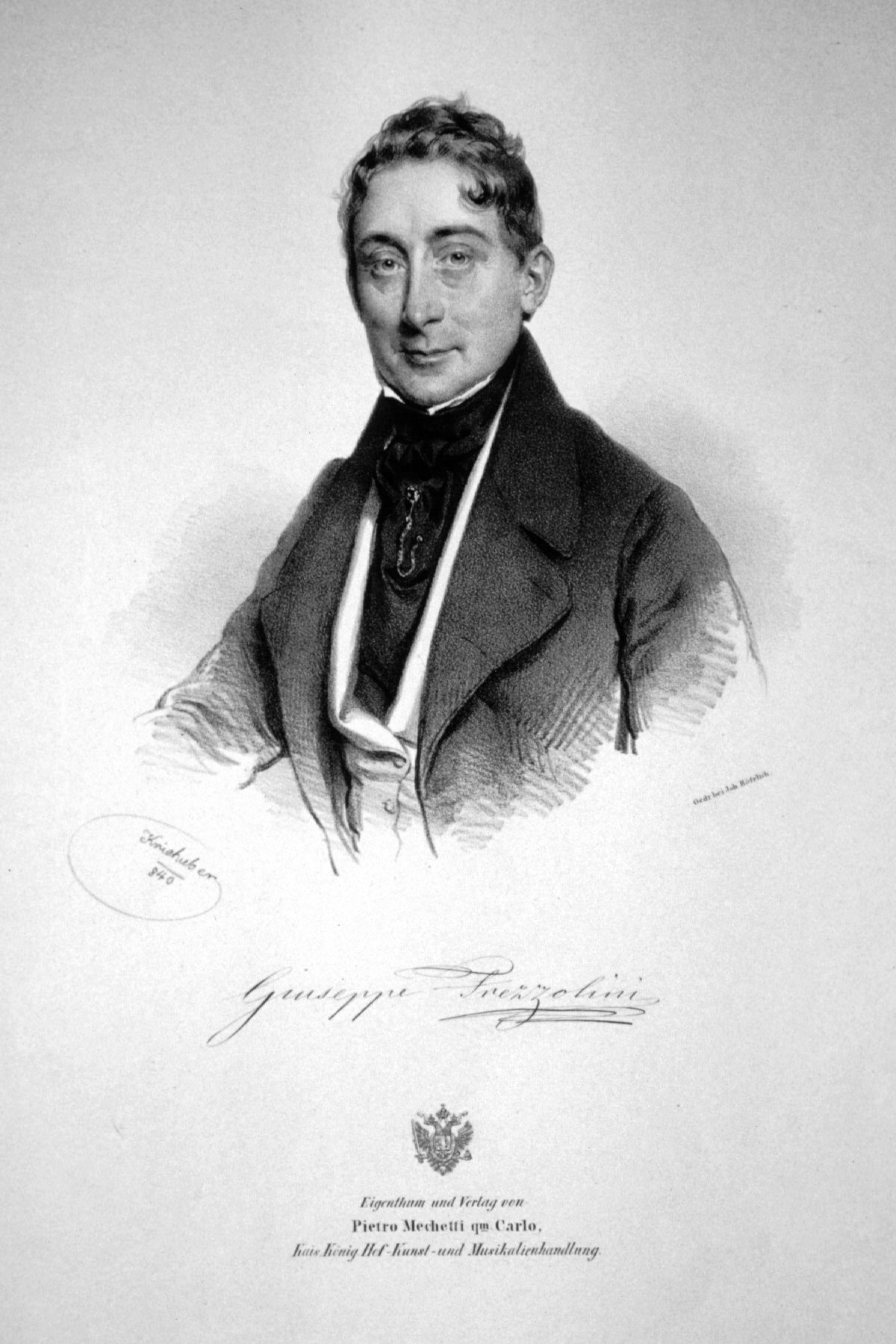
Giuseppe Frezzolini Lithograph by Josef Kriehuber, 1840

Giuseppe Frezzolini (9 November 1789 – 16 March 1861) was an Italian operatic bass. Born in Orvieto, he studied singing in his native city with G. Pedoto. He began his career in 1819 and was active in Italy's leading opera houses up into the 1840s. He is best known for creating the role of Dr Dulcamara in the world premiere of Gaetano Donizetti's L'elisir d'amore at the Teatro della Canobbiana in Milan on 12 May 1832. He also sang parts in the world premieres of two other Donizetti operas: Pasquale in Olivo e Pasquale (7 January 1827, Teatro Valle, Rome) and Belfiore in Alina, regina di Golconda (12 May 1828, Teatro Carlo Felice, Genoa). He died in Orvieto in 1861. He was the father of soprano Erminia Frezzolini.
