= Le philtre =

1831 opera in two acts by Daniel Auber

- Opéra comique by Daniel Auber
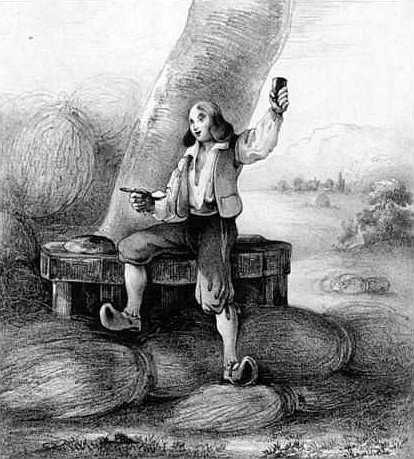
- Adolphe Nourrit in the role of Guillaume
- Librettist: Eugène Scribe
- Language: French
- Premiere: Paris

Le philtre is an 1831 opera in two acts by Daniel Auber to a libretto by Eugène Scribe set in the Basque country. It premiered at the Théâtre de l’Académie royale de musique on 20 June 1831. In the 20th century it was largely eclipsed by the success of an Italian opera based on Scribe's libretto, which appeared in Italy in the next year, Donizetti’s L'elisir d'amore. But in the 19th century Auber's original was largely judged superior.

== Cast ==
Guillaume ........, a simple peasant, in love with Térézine - Adolphe Nourrit (became Nemorino in Donizetti's L'elisir d'amore) tenor
Térézine.......... - Mme Damoreau (Adina in L'elisir)
Joli-Cœur ........ - Dabadie (Belcore in L'elisir)
Fontanarose....... - Levasseur (Dulcamara in L'elisir)
Jeannette ........ - Janurek (Gianetta in L'elisir)
Soldiers, peasants and young girls

== Recording ==
- Patrick Kabongo tenor (Guillaume), Emmanuel Franco (Joli-Cœur), Eugenio Di Lieto (Fontanarose) Luiza Fatyol (Térézine), Adina Vilichi (Jeannette). Cracow Philharmonic Chorus Cracow Philharmonic Orchestra Luciano Acocella, Naxos 2CD 2022
