= Pia de' Tolomei (opera) =

Opera by Gaetano Donizetti

- Opera by Gaetano Donizetti
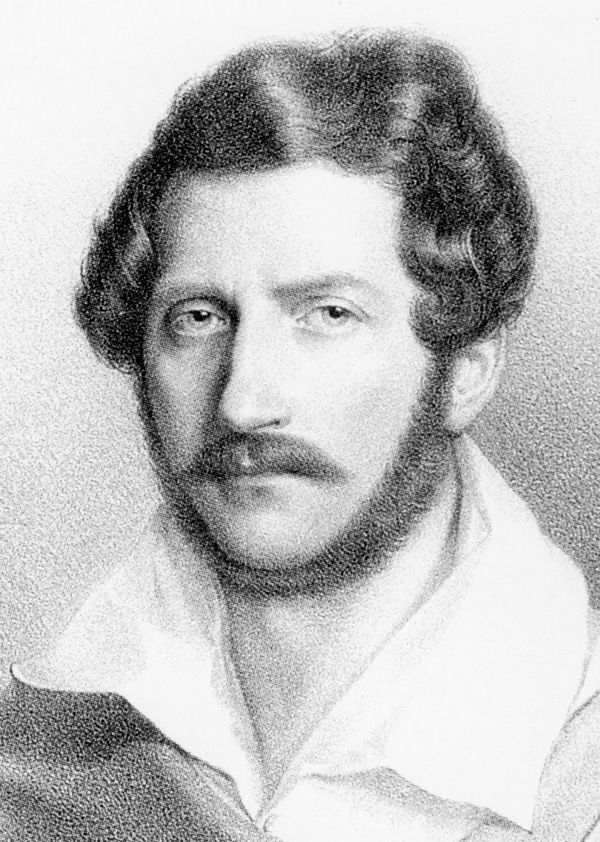
- Gaetano Donizetti c. 1835
- Librettist: Salvadore Cammarano
- Language: Italian
- Based on: Dante's The Divine Comedy
- Premiere: 18 February 1837; Teatro Apollo in Venice

Pia de' Tolomei is a tragedia lirica (tragic opera) in two acts by Gaetano Donizetti. Salvadore Cammarano wrote the Italian libretto after Bartolomeo Sestini's verse novella Pia de' Tolomei, which was based on Canto V, vv. 130–136 from Dante's narrative poem The Divine Comedy part 2: Purgatorio. It premiered on 18 February 1837 at the Teatro Apollo in Venice.

== Composition history ==
Background

Pia de' Tolomei is a tragic figure whom Dante encountered in Purgatory. Her story was so familiar to Dante's readers that an understated allusion was enough to call it to mind:

Italian

«Deh, quando tu sarai tornato al mondo,
e riposato de la lunga via»,
seguitò 'l terzo spirito al secondo,
«Ricorditi di me, che son la Pia;
Siena mi fé, disfecemi Maremma:
salsi colui che 'nnanellata pria
disposando m'avea con la sua gemma.»

Translation in English

“Ah, when you have returned to the world,
and rested from the long journey,”
followed the third spirit after the second,
“remember me, the one who is Pia;
Siena made me, Maremma undid me:
he knows it, the one who first encircled
my finger with his jewel, when he married me.”

== Performance history ==
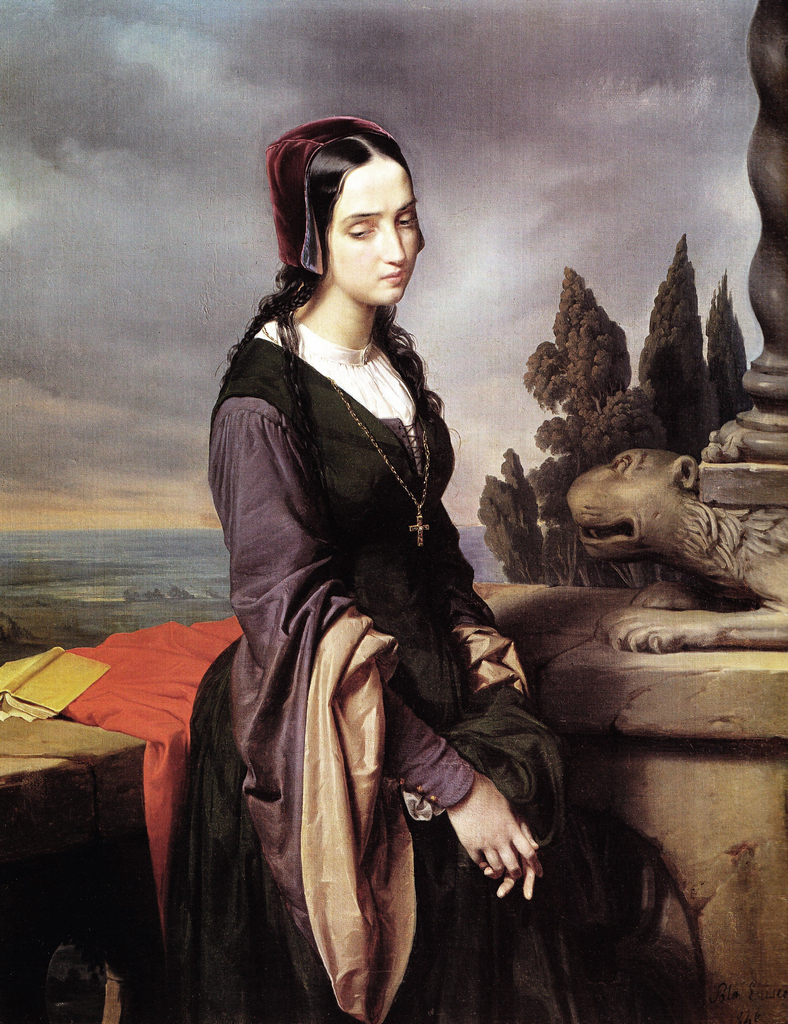
Pia de' Tolomei (Eliseo Sala, 1846), Pinacoteca Tosio Martinengo, Brescia

19th century

Donizetti agreed to write Pia de' Tolomei for the Teatro La Fenice in Venice and began composing it in October 1836 before the premiere of L'assedio di Calais in Naples in November. In early December he left for Venice, but was delayed in Genoa by an eighteen-day quarantine due to a cholera epidemic and while there learned that the Teatro La Fenice had been destroyed by fire on 12 December. Since the directors felt the production would have to be canceled, they wanted him to take a substantial reduction in his fee. After this news Donizetti originally intended to return to Naples, but having just signed a contract to purchase a new home prior to leaving Naples, he changed his mind and decided to proceed directly to Venice to see what could be done. After arriving he was able to reach an agreement with La Fenice's management and its impresario, Alessandro Lanari, to perform Pia de' Tolomei in early February at another theatre in Venice, the Teatro Apollo, where La Fenice's season had been transferred.

The opening was delayed when bass Celestino Salvatori, who had been scheduled to sing the role of Nello della Pietra, became ill, and Donizetti had to rewrite the part for the baritone Giorgio Ronconi. The opera finally opened on 18 February, and Donizetti wrote a letter to a friend that "Pia pleased altogether, except for the first act finale." In fact, that finale had been "greeted with whistles of disapproval". Donizetti revised the opera with Cammarano's help in the spring of 1837, and this version was performed on 31 July 1837 in the Adriatic resort of Sinigaglia. Donizetti revised it a second time with the help of an unknown librettist for the Teatro Argentina in Rome, where it was performed in May 1838 with the soprano Giuseppina Strepponi (the future wife of Verdi) in the title role.

It was finally performed on 30 September 1838 in Naples, but under the condition that Pia did not die. It was not well received over its ten performances, and was revived at the end of 1839. The opera was performed in Milan and Florence in 1839 (as well as some other Italian theatres), Barcelona in 1844, Lisbon in 1847, and Malta in 1854–1855, after which it fell from the repertory.

20th century and beyond

A revival took place on 3 September 1967 at the Teatro dei Rinnovati in Siena, a production which was also staged in Bologna in March of the following year. It was given a concert performance on 26 February 1978 at the Queen Elizabeth Hall in London. Among other performances, the opera was staged at La Fenice in 2005, by English Touring Opera in 2016, and received its US premiere at the Spoleto Festival in May 2018.

== Roles ==
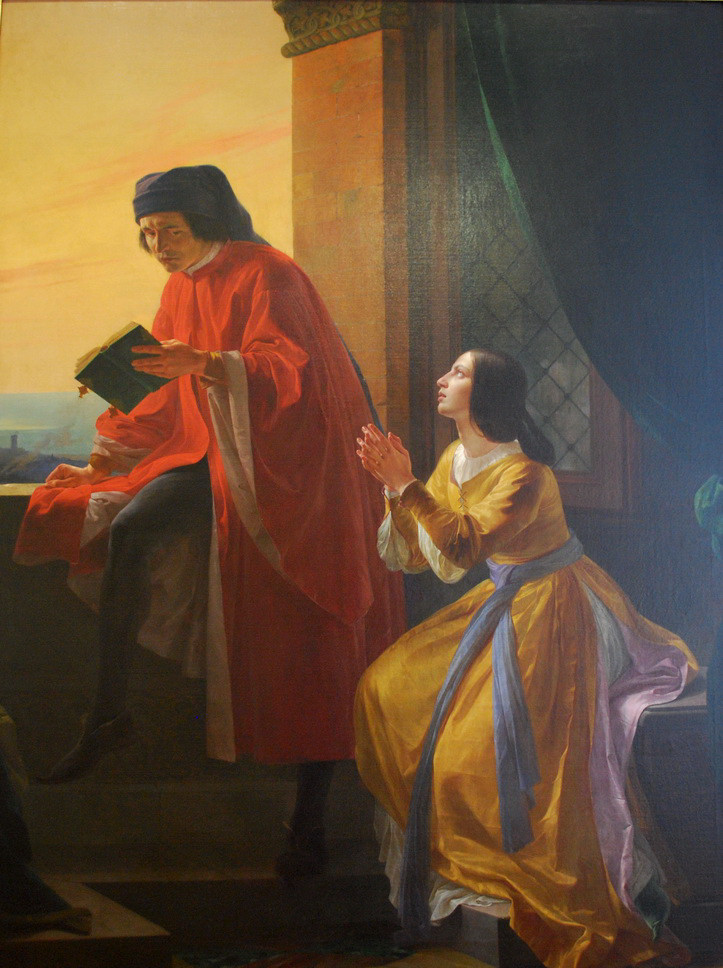
Pia de' Tolomei (Carlo Arienti, 1843–1854)

| Role | Voice type | Premiere Cast, 18 February 1837 (Conductor: – ) |
|---|---|---|
| Pia, Nello's wife | soprano | Fanny Tacchinardi Persiani |
| Ghino degli Armieri, Nello's cousin | tenor | Antonio Poggi |
| Nello della Pietra | baritone | Giorgio Ronconi |
| Rodrigo de' Tolomei, Pia's brother | contralto | Rosina Mazzarelli |
| Piero, a hermit | bass | Alessandro Meloni |
| Ubaldo, Nello's servant | tenor | Alessandro Giacchini |
| Bice | soprano | Marietta Bramati |
| Lamberto, old servant of Pia's family | bass | Alessandro Cecconi |
| Il custode della Torre di Siena, Jailor of the Siena Tower | tenor | |
Servants, bridesmaids, hermits

== Synopsis ==
Place: Siena
Time: 1260

Ghino has fallen in love with Pia, wife of his cousin Nello, a Ghibelline lord. When she refuses his love, as revenge Ghino informs Nello that he has discovered a secret message (found by the mischievous servant Ubaldo) proving that Pia has an adulterous relation. It tells of a secret meeting to be held between Pia and her lover. Ghino goes to the place described in the message, and does find Pia with a man. Ghino does not know that the man is not her lover but her brother Rodrigo, a Guelph, whom she is helping to escape from Nello's prison. Rodrigo manages to escape, but Pia is captured and imprisoned.

Ghino again offers her his love, promising to give her freedom in exchange; but the woman still refuses. Impressed by Pia's virtue and informed of the true identity of her alleged lover, Ghino repents and, mortally wounded in battle, reveals the truth to Nello. However, Nello had already given to his servant Ubaldo the order to kill Pia by poisoning. Nello rushes to stop the servant, but it is too late: he finds his wife is dying. On her deathbed, Pia forgives her husband, and effects a reconciliation between him and Rodrigo.

[When it was finally accepted for performances at the Teatro San Carlo in Naples on 30 September 1838, it was with the requirement that Pia not die.]

== Recordings ==
| Year | Cast: Pia, Ghino degli Armieri, Nello della Pietra, Rodrigo | Conductor, Opera House and Orchestra | Label |
|---|---|---|---|
| 2004 | Majella Cullagh, Bruce Ford, Roberto Servile, Manuela Custer | David Parry; London Philharmonic Orchestra and Geoffrey Mitchell Choir | Audio CD: Opera Rara; Cat: ORC 30 |
| 2005 | Patrizia Ciofi, Dario Schmunck, Andrew Schroeder, Laura Polverelli | Paolo Arrivabeni; Teatro La Fenice Orchestra and Chorus (Audio and video recordings made at performances in the Teatro La Fenice, April) | Audio CD: Dynamic; Cat: CDS 488/1-2; DVD: Dynamic; Cat: 33488 |
