= Domenico Mombelli =

Italian opera singer

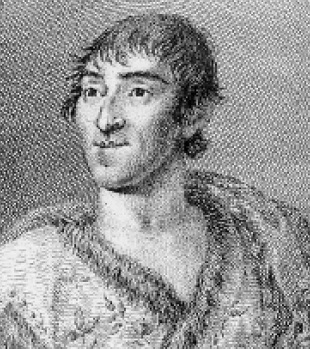
- Born: Francesco Domenico Mombelli; 13 January 1755; Villanova Monferrato, Italy
- Died: 15 March 1835 (aged 80); Bologna, Italy
- Occupations: opera singer (tenor); composer
- Relatives: Luisa Laschi (first wife); Vincenza Viganò (second wife); Ester Mombelli (daughter); Anna Mombelli (daughter)

Domenico Mombelli (13 January 1755 – 15 March 1835) was an Italian operatic tenor and composer. Born in Villanova Monferrato, Mombelli was the head of a distinguished family of singers and musicians that included his first wife, Luisa Laschi, who created the role of Countess Almaviva in The Marriage of Figaro; his second wife, Vincenza Viganò-Mombelli who wrote the libretto for Rossini's Demetrio e Polibio; and his daughters Ester and Anna, both of whom had successful careers as opera singers. He was also the founder and head of a travelling opera company which performed in Lisbon, Padua, and Milan from 1806 to 1811. Amongst his compositions were the opera Didone to a libretto by Metastasio, several oratorios, and three collections of arias for voice and piano. Mombelli spent his final years teaching singing in Bologna where he died at the age of 80.
