= Domenico Ronconi =

Italian opera singer (tenore)

Domenico Ronconi (11 July 1772 – 13 April 1839) was an Italian operatic tenor who had an active international career in leading opera houses from 1796 to 1829. He then embarked on a second career as a voice teacher in Milan which lasted until his death in that city in 1839.

== Life and career ==
Born in Lendinara, Domenico Ronconi studied singing with Abbot Cervellini in Rovigo. He made his debut at the Teatro San Benedetto in Venice in 1796. From 1802 to 1805 he was committed to the Mariinsky Theatre in St. Petersburg.

In 1808 he was heard in the premiere of Giuseppe Maria Orlandini's La Dama Soldato at La Scala.

Ronconi performed at the Vienna Court Opera in 1809–1810. In Vienna he sang before Napoleon who later acquired his talents for his marriage celebration to Marie Louise, Duchess of Parma in Paris in 1810. He made appearances at the Paris Opera in 1810–1811, and was thereafter active in Italy's leading opera houses for most of that decade. From 1819 to 1829, he was committed to the Munich Hofoper.

After his retirement from the stage in 1829, Ronconi founded a music school in Milan, which became widely known. He became a famous teacher of singing, with his notable pupils including soprano Erminia Frezzolini and contralto Caroline Unger. He was also the teacher of three of his sons, Giorgio Ronconi, Sebastiano Ronconi, and Felice Ronconi, all of whom had successful singing careers.
