= Erminia Frezzolini =

Italian soprano

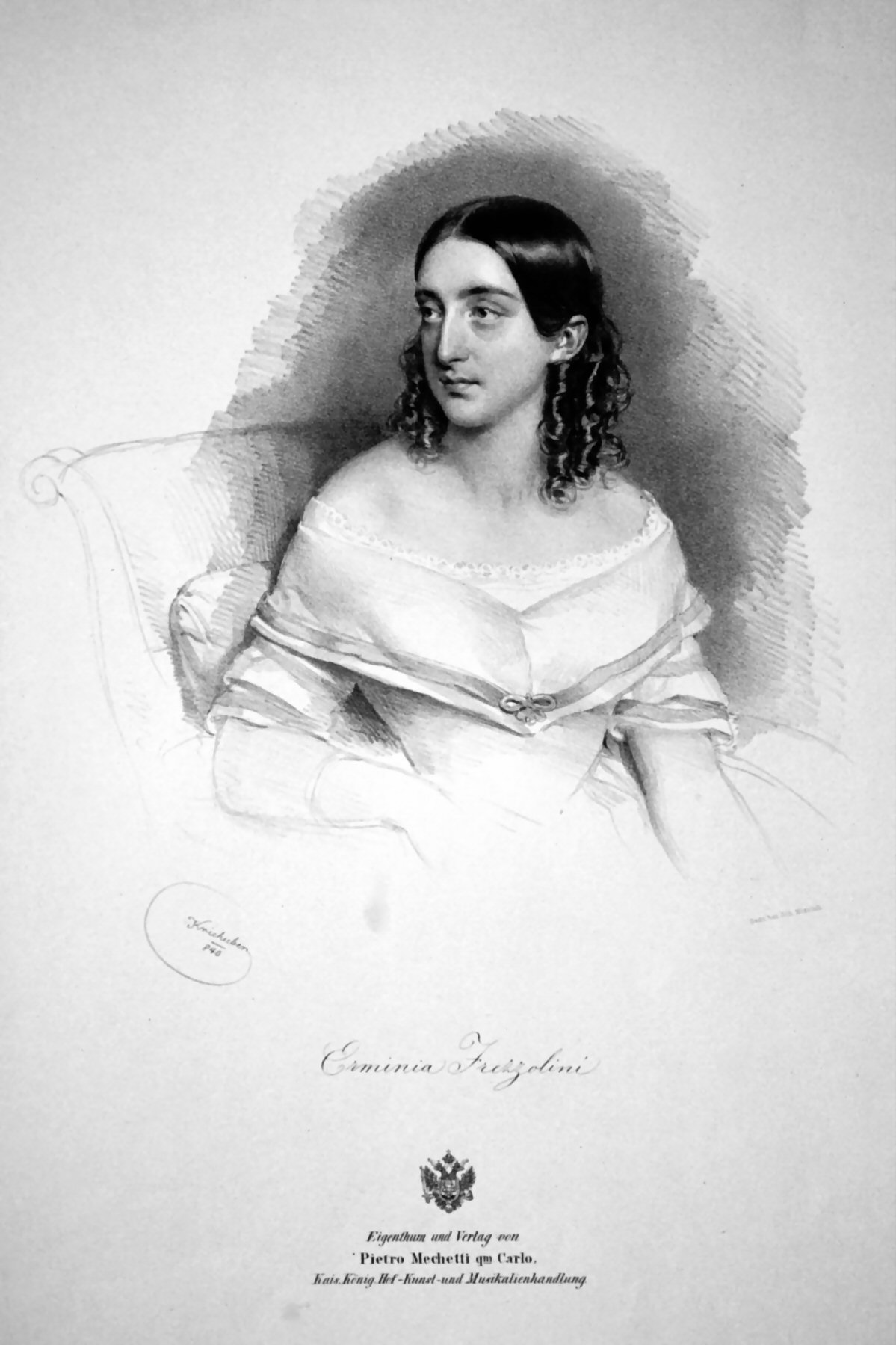
- Erminia Frezzolini (1840)
- Born: 27 March 1818; Orvieto, Italy
- Died: 5 November 1884 (age 66); Paris, France
- Occupation: operatic soprano
- Years active: 1837 - 1874

Erminia Frezzolini (27 March 1818 – 5 November 1884) was an Italian operatic soprano. She excelled in the coloratura soprano repertoire, drawing particular acclaim in the bel canto operas of Gaetano Donizetti and Vincenzo Bellini. She was married to tenor Antonio Poggi from 1841 to 1846.

== Life and career ==
Born in Orvieto on 27 March 1818, Frezzolini initially studied singing with her father, the famous bass Giuseppe Frezzolini. She then studied in Milan with Domenico Ronconi and in Florence with Andrea Nencini and N. Tachinardi. At the advice of Maria Malibran she pursued further studies with Manuel Patricio Rodríguez García.

In 1837 Frezzolini made her professional opera debut in the title role of Bellini's Beatrice di Tenda at the Teatro della Pergola in Florence. She quickly arose in major opera houses throughout Italy, often in the operas of Bellini and Donizetti. In 1838 she was heard at the opera houses in Siena and Ferrara. In 1839 she portrayed the title role in the house premiere of Mercadante's Elena da Feltre at the Teatro Comunale di Bologna.

She sang several more roles in Bologna in 1838–1839, including the title roles in Donizetti's Anna Bolena, Bellini's Beatrice di Tenda, and Donizetti's Lucia di Lammermoor. She made her debut at La Scala in 1839 as Bianca in Mercadante's Le due illustri rivali. She also made her debuts that year at the opera houses in Pisa, Reggio Emilia, and Perugia.

Frezzolini created the role of Giselda in the world premiere of Verdi's I Lombardi alla prima crociata on 11 February 1843 at La Scala. On 15 February 1845 she sang the title role in the world premiere of Verdi's Giovanna d'Arco at La Scala. She portrayed Camilla in the world premiere of Mercadante's Orazi e Curiazi at the Teatro di San Carlo in Naples on 10 November 1846. On the international stage she made appearances at the Mariinsky Theatre in Saint Petersburg, the Royal Opera House in London, the Teatro Real in Madrid, the Theater am Kärntnertor in Vienna, the Théâtre-Italien in Paris, and throughout North America. She remained active on the stage up until 1868.

Frezzolini died in Paris on 5 November 1884, aged 66.
