= Domenico Cosselli =

Italian opera singer (1801–1855)

Domenico Cosselli (27 May 1801 in Parma – 9 November 1855 in Parma) was an Italian operatic bass-baritone, particularly associated with Rossini operas.

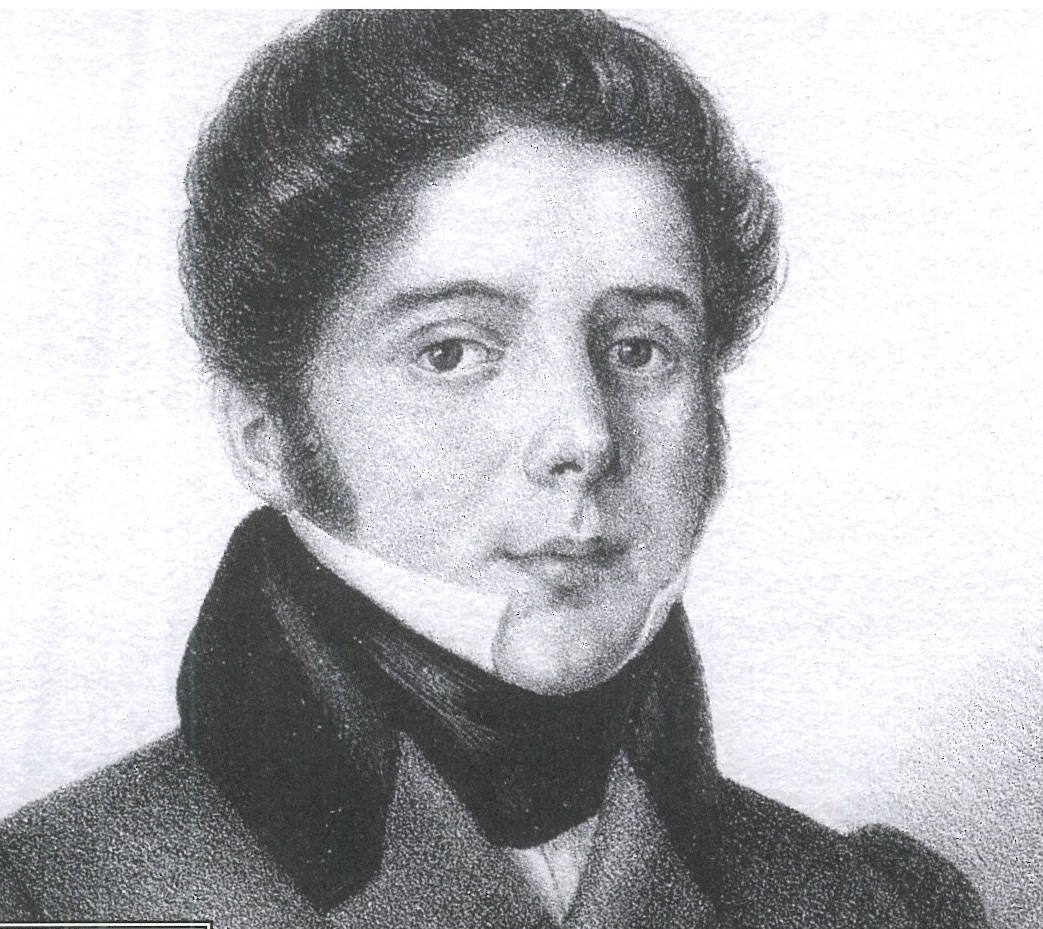
Domenico Cosselli

He began his vocal studies in his native city in 1814 and made his stage debut there in 1821. He quickly made a specialty of Rossini roles, singing in Il barbiere di Siviglia, Tancredi, La cenerentola, La gazza ladra, Semiramide, etc. He created for Donizetti the roles of Olivo in Olivo e Pasquale in 1827, and of Azzo in Parisina in 1833, also creating the role of Arnoldo in Pacini's Carlo di Borgogna, in 1835.

Cosselli was one of the first singers to make the transition between the old conception of the bass vocal range to what we know today as the baritone, a voice type that was still in its infancy. For Donizetti again, he created the role of Enrico in the highly successful Lucia di Lammermoor, at the San Carlo in Naples, in 1835, giving to the role a new dramatic dimension, looking forward to what was to become known as the Verdi-baritone; the standard published score of Lucia contains several downward transpositions which mask the consistently high tessitura of the role as written for Cosselli.

He went on singing the florid bass roles of Rossini such as Mosè, Maometto, Assur, etc.

== Sources ==
- Le guide de l'opéra, Roland Mancini & Jean-Jacques Rouveroux, (Fayard, 1986) ISBN 2-213-01563-5
- Ashbrook, William, Donizetti and His Operas, Cambridge University Press, 1983, pp. 376. ISBN 0-521-27663-2
