= L'elisir d'amore =

1832 opera by Gaetano Donizetti

- Melodramma giocoso by Gaetano Donizetti
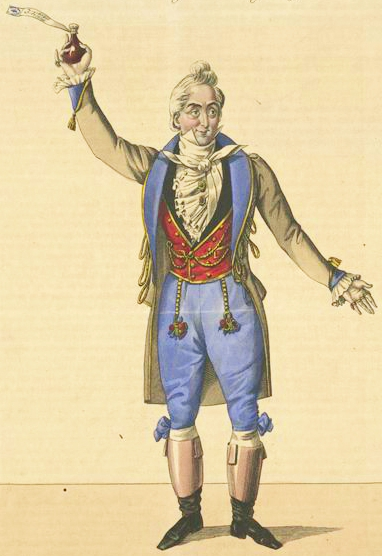
- Giuseppe Frezzolini as Dulcamara in the premiere of the opera
- Librettist: Felice Romani
- Language: Italian
- Based on: Eugène Scribe's libretto for Auber's Le philtre
- Premiere: 12 May 1832; Teatro della Canobbiana, Milan

L'elisir d'amore (pronounced [leliˈzir daˈmoːre]; The Elixir of Love) is a melodramma giocoso (comic melodrama, opera buffa) in two acts by the Italian composer Gaetano Donizetti. Felice Romani wrote the Italian libretto, after Eugène Scribe's libretto for Daniel Auber's Le philtre (1831). The opera premiered on 12 May 1832 at the Teatro della Canobbiana in Milan and has remained continually in the international opera repertory.

== Composition history ==
Writing in haste in a six-week period, Donizetti insisted on a number of changes from the original libretto by Scribe. The best known of these was the insertion of "Una furtiva lagrima" and the duet between Adina and Nemorino in the first act, "Chiedi all'aura lusinghiera". The melody to the duet "Io son ricco e tu sei bella" in act 2, scene 1 recurs in the final scene of the opera sung by Dulcamara as a solo aria with new scabrous lyrics. The central narrative theme, the triumph of sincerity, is essential to the Romantic outlook; musically, in Donizetti's hands, the treatment became more romantic than in the Auber version: L'elisir d'amore features three big duets between the tenor and soprano. There is also personal history in this opera: Donizetti's military service was bought by a rich woman, so that, unlike his brother Giuseppe (also a well known composer), he did not have to serve in the Austrian army.

== Performance history ==
The premiere of L'elisir d'amore took place at the Teatro della Canobbiana, Milan, on 12 May 1832. Between 1838 and 1848, L'elisir d'amore was the most often performed opera in Italy. Enrico Caruso played in the role of Nemorino for the first time in February 1901 at La Scala with the conductor Arturo Toscanini. The audience reception caused Caruso and the orchestra to repeat "Una furtiva lagrima" three times. Toscanini stated after the performance that: "Per Dio! Se questo Napoletano continua a cantare così, farà parlare di sè il mondo intero" (Heavens! If this Neapolitan continues to sing like this, he will be talked about all over the world). L'elisir d'amore remains one of the most performed of all Donizetti's operas: it appears as number 13 on the Operabase list of the most-performed operas worldwide in the five seasons between 2008 and 2013.

== Roles ==
| Role | Voice type | Premiere cast, 12 May 1832 (Conductor: Alessandro Rolla) |
|---|---|---|
| Nemorino, a simple peasant, in love with Adina | tenor | Gianbattista Genero |
| Adina, a wealthy landowner | soprano | Sabine Heinefetter |
| Belcore, a sergeant | baritone | Henri-Bernard Dabadie |
| Dr. Dulcamara, an itinerant medicine man | bass | Giuseppe Frezzolini |
| Giannetta, Adina's friend | soprano | Marietta Sacchi |
Peasants, soldiers of Belcore's platoon

== Synopsis ==
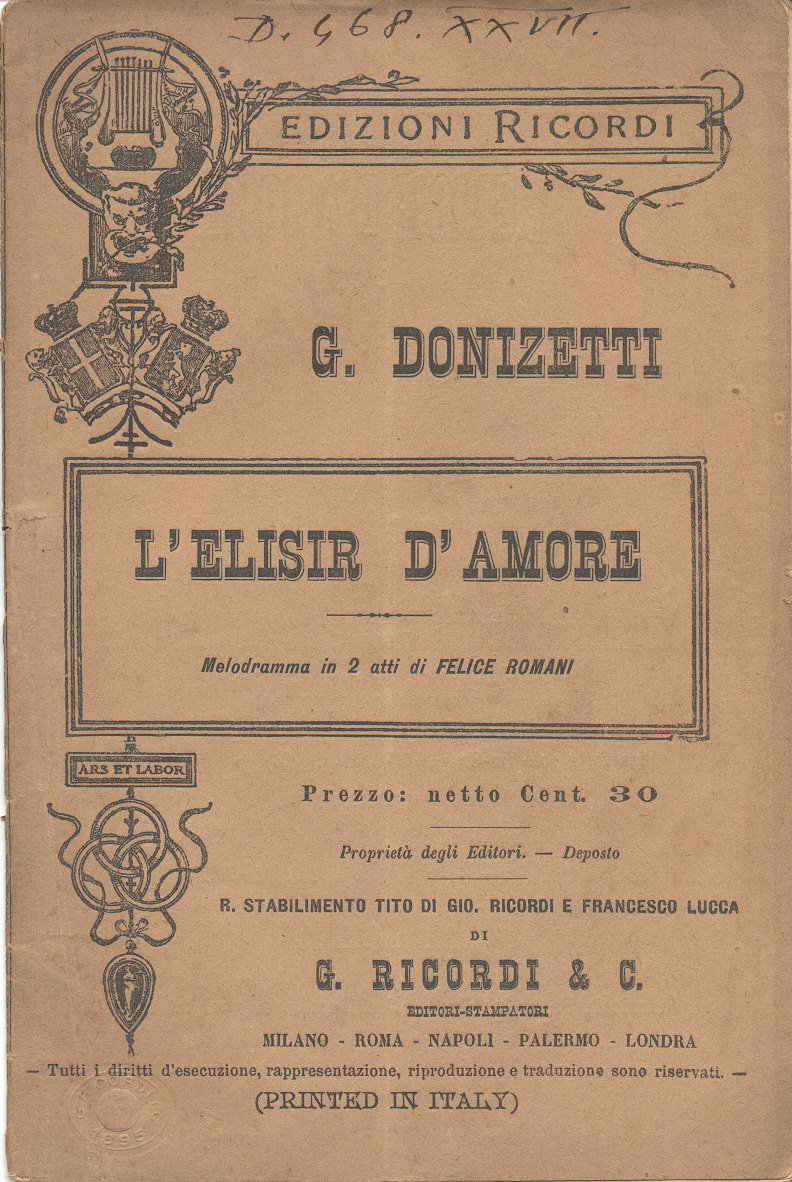
Title page of the libretto published by Ricordi

Place: A small village in the Basque Country, Spain
Time: The end of the 18th century

=== Act 1 ===
Nemorino, a poor peasant, is in love with Adina, a beautiful landowner, who torments him with her indifference. When Nemorino hears Adina reading to her workers the story of Tristan and Isolde, he is convinced that a magic potion will help him to gain Adina's love. The self-important Sergeant Belcore appears with his regiment and immediately sets about courting Adina in front of everyone. Nemorino becomes anxious (although Adina meanwhile secretly derides Belcore's complacency) and, alone with Adina, reveals his love for her. Adina rebuffs him, saying that she wants a different lover every day and that Nemorino would do well to follow her example. Nemorino declares that his feelings will never change. The traveling quack doctor, Dulcamara (the self-proclaimed Dr. Encyclopedia), arrives, selling his bottled cure-all to the townspeople. Nemorino innocently asks Dulcamara if he has any of Isolde's love potion. Despite failing to recognize the name "Isolde", Dulcamara's commercial talents nevertheless enable him to sell a bottle of the "elixir" – in reality only cheap red wine – to Nemorino, who pays for it with all the cash at his disposal.

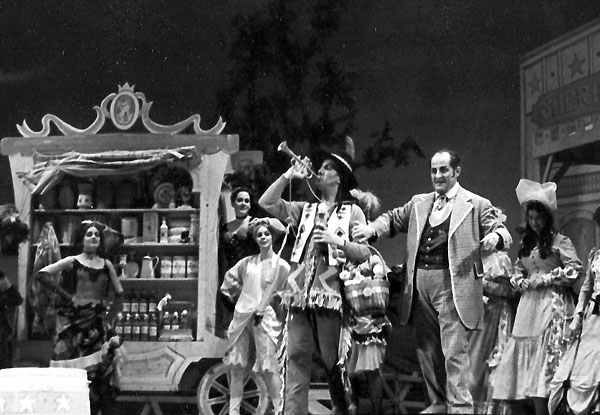
"Dr. Dulcamara" (Andrew Foldi), an itinerant quack and purveyor of "elixirs" and other tonics, gestures to "Cochise" (Bruce Cooper), his sly trumpet-playing assistant, to call together the townspeople as he sings his act 1 (scene 2) aria "Udite, udite, o rustici" (Hear me, hear me, o peasants) in a performance of the Cincinnati Opera's 1968 "Wild West" production of L'elisir d'amore, in which the 1832 opera's setting was moved from a village in the Basque country to 1870s Texas.

To make a safe escape, Dulcamara tells Nemorino the potion needs 24 hours to take effect – by which time, the doctor will be long gone. Nemorino drinks the potion in haste to watch the effect the following day. Emboldened by the "elixir" (in fact, drunk), Nemorino feigns indifference when he encounters Adina, as he expects that the elixir will facilitate his conquest of Adina the next day. She becomes increasingly annoyed; perhaps she has feelings for Nemorino after all? Belcore returns and proposes marriage to Adina. Still riled by Nemorino and wishing to give him a lesson, Adina falsely promises to marry Belcore in six days' time. Yet, Nemorino only laughs in response: such confidence is sustained in the belief in the magic potion. However, when Belcore learns that his regiment must leave the next morning, Adina promises to marry him before his departure. This panics Nemorino, who cries out for Dr. Dulcamara to come to his aid. Adina, meanwhile, invites everyone to the wedding.

=== Act 2 ===
Adina and Belcore's wedding party is in full swing. Dr. Dulcamara encourages Adina to sing a duet with him to entertain the guests. The notary arrives to make the marriage official. Adina is annoyed to see that Nemorino has not appeared, for the proposed marriage has been intended only to punish him. While everyone goes to witness the signing of the wedding contract, Dulcamara stays behind, helping himself to food and drink. Having seen the notary, Nemorino appears, depressed, as he believes that he has lost Adina. He sees Dulcamara and frantically begs him for a more powerful, faster-acting elixir. Although Dulcamara is proud to boast of his philanthropy, upon discovering that Nemorino now has no money he changes his tune and marches off, refusing to supply him anything. Belcore emerges, musing about why Adina has suddenly put off the wedding and signing of the contract. He spots Nemorino and asks his rival why he is depressed. When Nemorino says he needs cash, Belcore suggests joining the army, as he will receive funds on the spot. Belcore tries to excite Nemorino with tales of military life, while Nemorino only thinks of getting the potion and thus winning Adina, if only for a day before departure. Belcore produces a contract, which Nemorino signs in return for the money. Nemorino privately vows to rush and buy more potion, while Belcore muses about how sending Nemorino off to war has so easily dispatched his rival.

After the two men have left, Giannetta gossips with the women of the village. Swearing them all to secrecy, she reveals that Nemorino's uncle has just died and left his nephew a large fortune. However, neither Nemorino nor Adina is yet aware of this. Nemorino enters, having spent his military signing bonus on – and consumed – a large amount of the fake elixir from Dr. Dulcamara. Hoping to share his fortune, the women approach Nemorino with overly friendly greetings. So out of character is this that Nemorino takes it as proof of the elixir's efficacy. Adina sees Nemorino with the women, is rattled by his newfound popularity, and asks Dr. Dulcamara for an explanation. Unaware that Adina is the object of Nemorino's affection, Dulcamara explains that Nemorino spent his last penny on the elixir and joined the army for money to get more, so desperate was he to win the love of some unnamed cruel beauty. Adina immediately recognises Nemorino's sincerity, regrets her behaviour and realises that she has loved Nemorino all along. Although Dulcamara seizes the opportunity to try to sell her some of his potion to win back Nemorino, Adina declares that she has full confidence in her own powers of attraction.

"Una furtiva lagrima"
Sung by Enrico Caruso in 1911 for the Victor Talking Machine Company.

Nemorino appears alone, pensive, reflecting on a tear he saw in Adina's eye when he was ignoring her earlier. Solely based on that, he convinces himself that Adina loves him. She enters and asks why he has chosen to join the army and leave the village. When Nemorino explains that he was seeking a better life, Adina responds that he is loved and that she has purchased back his military contract from Sergeant Belcore. She offers the cancelled contract to Nemorino and reassures him that, if he stays, he will be happy. As he takes the contract, Adina turns to leave. Nemorino believes she is abandoning him and flies into a desperate fit, vowing that if he is not loved he might as well go off and die a soldier. Deeply moved by his fidelity, Adina finally declares that she will love Nemorino forever. Nemorino is ecstatic. Adina begs him to forgive her, which he does with a kiss. Belcore returns to see Nemorino and Adina in an embrace. When Adina explains that she loves Nemorino, the Sergeant takes the news in his stride, noting that there are plenty of other women in the world. Adina and Nemorino learn about the inheritance from his uncle. Dulcamara returns and boasts of the success of his elixir: Nemorino is now not only loved but also rich. Dulcamara exults in the boost this will bring to the sales of his product. As Dulcamara prepares to leave, everyone queues up to buy the elixir and to hail Dulcamara as a great physician.

== Noted excerpts ==
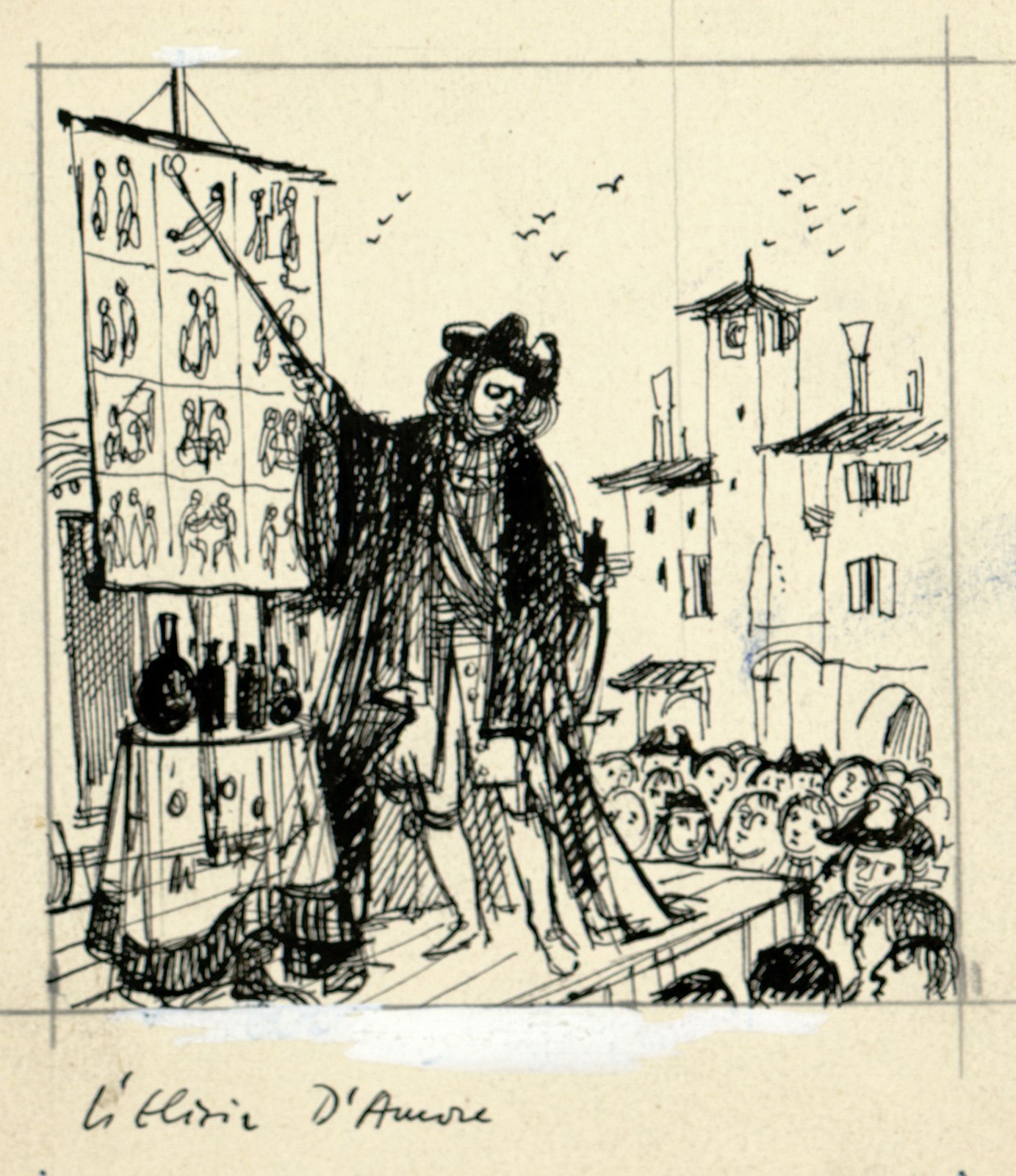
Disegno per copertina di libretto, drawing for L'elisir d'amore (undated).

The opera contains the popular tenor aria "Una furtiva lagrima", a romanza that has a considerable performance history in the concert hall.

Act 1

- "Quanto è bella, quanto è cara" (How beautiful she is, how dear she is) – Nemorino, scene 1
- "Della crudele Isotta" (Of the cruel Isolda) – Adina, scene 1
- "Esulti pur la Barbara" – Adina and Nemorino
- "Come Paride vezzoso" (Just as the charming Paris) – Belcore, scene 1
- "Udite, udite, o rustici" (Listen, listen, o peasants) – Doctor Dulcamara, scene 2

Act 2

- Barcarolle for two voices "Io son ricco e tu sei bella" (I am rich, and you are beautiful) – Dulcamara, Adina, scene 1
- "Venti scudi!" – Nemorino and Belcore, scene 1
- "Una furtiva lagrima" (A furtive tear) – Nemorino, scene 2
- "Prendi, per me sei libero" (Take it, I have freed you) – Adina, scene 2

== Arrangements and adaptations ==
In 1840, Richard Wagner arranged the work for solo piano. W. S. Gilbert wrote a burlesque adaptation of the opera, Dulcamara, or the Little Duck and the Great Quack, in 1866.
