= Demetrio e Polibio =

Opera by Gioachino Rossini

- Opera by Gioachino Rossini
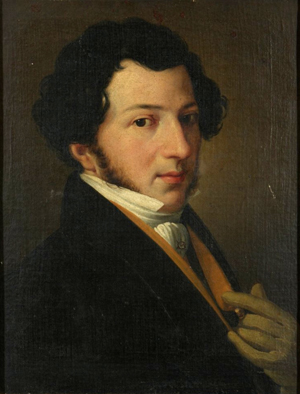
- Rossini c. 1815
- Librettist: Vincenzina Viganò-Mombelli
- Language: Italian
- Premiere: 18 May 1812; Teatro Valle, Rome

Demetrio e Polibio (Italian pronunciation: [deˈmɛːtrjo e ppoˈliːbjo]; Demetrius and Polybius) is a two-act operatic dramma serio by Gioachino Rossini to a libretto by Vincenzina Viganò-Mombelli. The opera was orchestrated for flute, oboes, clarinets, basson, horns, trumpets, and strings.

Demetrio e Polibio was Rossini's first attempt at a full-scale opera, "assembled piecemeal" during his student days at the Philharmonic Academy of Bologna in 1806. Because it was commissioned by tenor Domenico Mombelli (whose wife wrote the libretto) and was performed privately by Mombelli and his two daughters, a performance which Rossini did not attend, it was not his first fully staged opera.

The opera was not professionally staged until 18 May 1812, when it premiered at Rome's Teatro Valle.

== Roles ==
Role	Voice type	Premiere Cast, 18 May 1812 (Conductor: - )
Polybius, King of Parthia	bass	Lodovico Olivieri
Lisinga, his daughter	soprano	Maria Ester Mombelli
Siveno, Lisinga's lover	contralto	Marianna "Anna" Mombelli
Demetrius, King of Syria, Siveno's estranged father	tenor	Domenico Mombelli

== Synopsis ==
Time: 2nd Century, B.C.
Place: Parthia

=== Act 1 ===
The good Polybius, King of Parthia, is the protector of both his own daughter Lisinga and her lover Siveno. Everyone believes Siveno to be the son of Minteus, a minister of King Demetrius of Syria, but he is actually the long estranged son of Demetrius. Demetrius, holding Minteus responsible for his son's disappearance, arrives at the court of Parthia in the guise of Eumeno, a royal messenger, and demands that Siveno be turned over to Syria. Polybius refuses. Siveno and Lisinga celebrate their marriage. Polybius confides to Siveno that he is worried about what has happened, but Siveno reassures him. Meanwhile, Eumene (Demetrius) plots to kidnap Siveno and bring him back to Syria. He bribes the servants and guards and at night manages to enter the Parthian court. However, when he arrives in the bed-chamber of the young couple, he finds Lisinga alone and kidnaps her instead. Polybius and Siveno try in vain to stop him.

=== Act 2 ===
Polybius and Siveno plead for Lisinga's release. In reply, Euemeno (Demetrius) threatens to kill her unless Siveno is turned over to him. In turn, Polybius threatens to kill Siveno unless Lisinga is released. The situation starts to resolve when Eumene (Demetrius), looks at an old medallion and realizes that Siveno is actually his lost son. Meanwhile, Polybius does not want to lose Lisinga, and Eumene (Demetrius) only wants Siveno. Desperate at their impending separation, Lisinga tries to kill Eumene, but he finally reveals his true identity as King Demetrius and announces that Siveno is his son. Peace is restored, and the couple live happily ever after.

== Recordings ==
Year	Cast: Polibio, Lisinga, Siveno, Demetrio	Conductor, Opera House and Orchestra	Label
1992	Giorgio Surjan, Christine Weidinger, Sara Mingardo, Dalmacio González	Massimiliano Carraro, Graz Symphony Orchestra and Sluk Chamber Choir of Bratislava (Recording of a performance at the Festival della Valle d'Itria, Martina Franca. 27 July)	Audio CD: Dynamic; Cat: CDS 171/1-2
2017	Luca Dall'Amico, Sofia Mchedlishvili, Victoria Yarovaya, César Arrieta	Luciano Acocella, Virtuosi Brunensis, Camerata Bach Choir Poznan; Recorded live at the Rossini in Wildbad Festival	CD:Naxos Records; Cat:8660405-06
