= Teatro Valle =

Theatre in Rome, Italy

Coordinates: 41.8975°N 12.4750°E

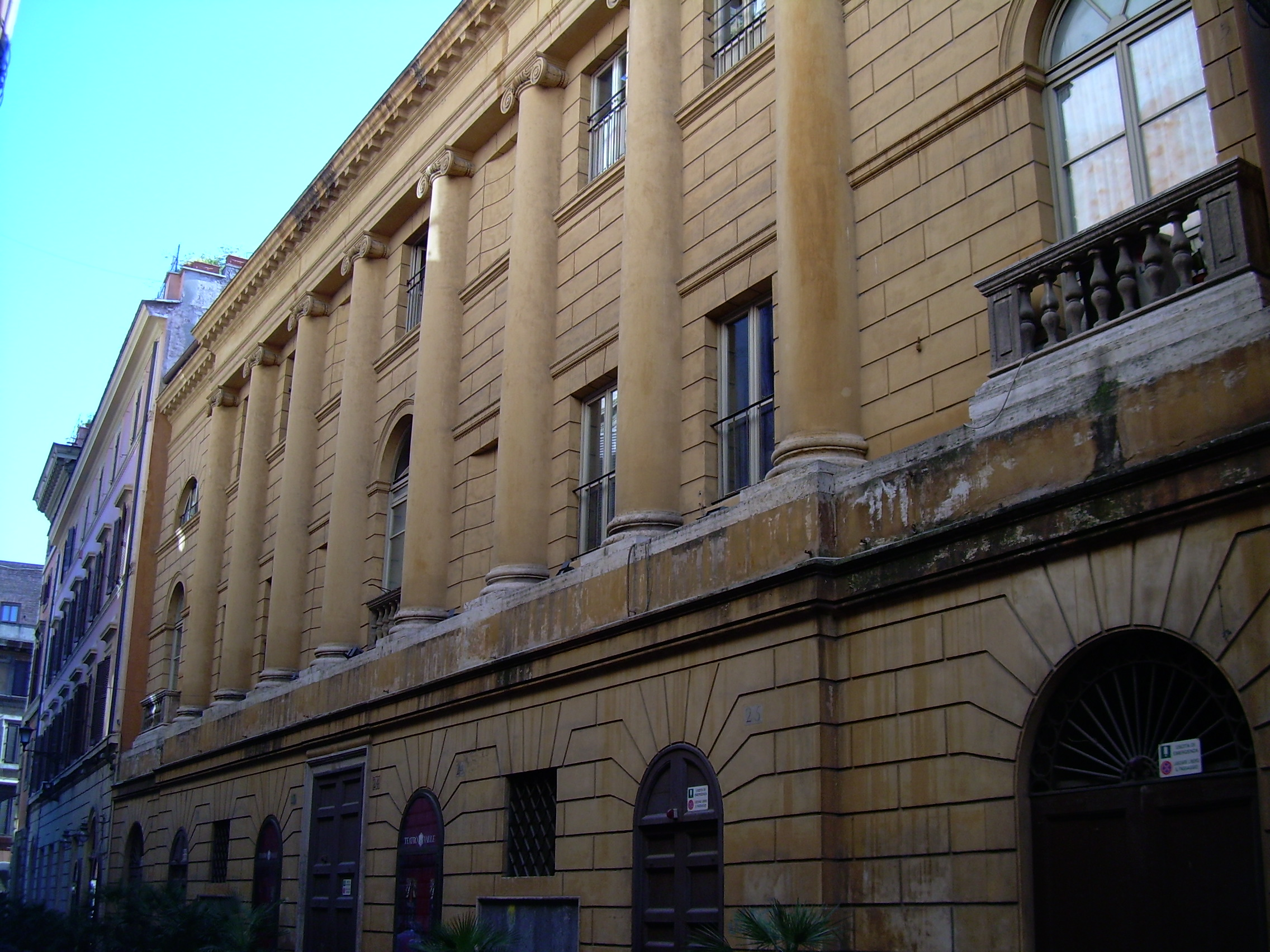
- Front of theatre

- Location within Rome
- Address: Via del Teatro Valle 21
- Location: Rome, Italy
- Type: Theatre

Construction
- Built: 1726
- Renovated: 1765/1791/1821
- Closed: 2010
- Architect: Tommaso Morelli
- Builder: Capranica family

The Teatro Valle (literally Valley Theater) is a theatre and former opera house in Rome, Italy. It was built in 1726 for the Capranica family. In the middle of the 19th century, it switched from staging opera and theatre to only performances of spoken drama. After closing down in 2010, it was squatted in 2011, then in 2014, the squatters were evicted.

== Construction ==
Commissioned by the Capranica family, the architect Tommaso Morelli designed the theatre, which was built in 1726. The seating in the Teatro Valle initially consisted of five tiers of 27 boxes. It underwent renovation by Mauro Fontana in 1765 and was restored again in 1791. The theatre was rebuilt in 1821 to the design of Valadier, completed by Salvi, and in 1845, a façade designed by Gaspare Servi was added. Today, it contains four tiers of boxes and a gallery.

== Performances ==
It was inaugurated with the staging of the tragedy Matilde by Simon Falconio Pratoli. After hosting a season of opera seria in 1730, the Valle was limited through much of the latter half of the 18th century to staging prose dramas as well as a mix of intermezzos and comic operas, particularly those of Galuppi, Piccinni, Anfossi, Sacchini, Paisiello, Guglielmi, and Cimarosa. It was the only theatre in Rome in 1782 and after 1786 which offered both spring and autumn seasons of opera as well as a season during Carnival.

Throughout the early 19th century, the Valle was regularly staging opera buffa and opera semiseria as well as prose comedies and, increasingly after 1830, serious melodramas. A number of operas during this time premiered at the Valle, including Rossini's Demetrio e Polibio (1812), Torvaldo e Dorliska (1815), and La Cenerentola (1817); Mercadante's Il geloso ravveduto (1820); Donizetti's L'ajo nell'imbarazzo (1824), Olivo e Pasquale (1827), Il furioso all’isola di San Domingo (1833), and Torquato Tasso (1833); Pacini's La gioventù di Enrico V (1820); and Luigi Ricci’s L’orfana di Ginevra (1829), Il sonnambulo (1829), and Chi dura vince (1834), as well as many lesser-known works from local composers.

Beginning from the middle of the 19th century, the Teatro Valle has staged only spoken drama. Luigi Pirandello's Six Characters in Search of an Author had its world premiere in the theatre in 1921.

== Occupation ==
The Ente teatrale italiano, a state organization to promote Italian theatre which partially supported the Teatro Valle, was shut down in 2010 as part of the Italian government's budget cuts for the arts in general. In June 2011, amidst rumours that the theatre was to be privatised and would lose its artistic independence, the building was squatted by a group of protesters consisting of actors, musicians, directors, technicians, and creative staff. The squatters were evicted in August 2014 on the orders of mayor Ignazio Marino. Since the reason for the eviction was the urgent nature of renovation work and nothing then happened, the theatre was re-occupied briefly in June 2016.
