= List of operas by Carlo Coccia =

This is a complete list of operas by Carlo Coccia (1782–1873).

== List of operas ==
Operas by Carlo Coccia
Title	Genre	Acts	Libretto	Premiere		Notes
Title	Genre	Acts	Libretto	Date	Venue	Notes
Il matrimonio per lettera di cambio	burletta per musica	2 acts	Giuseppe Checcherini (Première libretto, in Italian)	14 November 1807	Rome, Teatro Valle	
Il poeta fortunato, ossia Tutto il mal vien dal mantello	melodramma giocoso	2 acts	Gaetano Gasbarri (Première libretto, in Italian)	spring 1808	Florence, Teatro degli Intrepidi	
L'equivoco, o Le vicende del Martinaccio	dramma giocoso		Gaetano Gasbarri	Carnival 1809	Bologna, Teatro Marsigli	
Voglia di dote e non di moglie	dramma giocoso	2 acts	Francesco Aventi (Première libretto, in Italian)	Carnival 1809	Ferrara, Teatro Comunale	
La verità nella bugia	farsa	1 act	Giuseppe Maria Foppa (Première libretto, in Italian)	October 1809	Venice, Teatro San Moisè	
Una fatale supposizione, ovvero Amore e dovere (o La Matilde)	farsa per musica	1 act	Giuseppe Maria Foppa (Première libretto, in Italian)	19 January 1811	Venice, Teatro San Moisè	
I solitari	melodramma di sentimento	1 act	Gaetano Rossi (Première libretto, in Italian)	1 November 1811	Venice, Teatro San Moisè	
Il sogno verificato	azione eroica per musica	2 acts	Luigi Prividali (Première libretto, in Italian)	23 January 1812	Venice, Teatro La Fenice	
Arrighetto	dramma per musica	1 act	Angelo Anelli (Première libretto, in Italian)	9 January 1813	Venice, Teatro San Benedetto	
La donna selvaggia (o La selvaggia)	dramma semiserio	2 acts	Giuseppe Maria Foppa (Première libretto, in Italian)	24 June 1813	Venice, Teatro San Benedetto	Also as: La Matilde, spring 1814, Florence, Teatro alla Pergola; Revision: spring 1841, Naples, Teatro San Carlo
Il crescendo	opera buffa	1 act	Giuseppe Maria Foppa	16 February 1814	Venice, Teatro San Moisè	
Carlotta e Werther (o Carlotta e Verter)	dramma per musica	2 acts	Gaetano Gasbarri (Première libretto, in Italian)	autumn 1814	Florence, Teatro del Cocomero	After I dolori del giovane Werther by Goethe
Evellina	melodramma eroico	2 acts	Gaetano Rossi (Première libretto, in Italian)	26 December 1814	Milan, Teatro Re	
Euristea, o L'amore generoso	dramma per musica	2 acts	Giuseppe Maria Foppa (Première libretto, in Italian)	21 January 1815	Venice, Teatro La Fenice	
Clotilde	melodramma semiserio	2 acts	Gaetano Rossi	8 June 1815	Venice, Teatro San Benedetto	
I begli usi di città	dramma giocoso	2 acts	Angelo Anelli (Première libretto, in Italian)	11 October 1815	Milan, Teatro alla Scala	
Teseo e Medea	dramma per musica	2 acts	(Première libretto, in Italian)	26 December 1815	Turin, Teatro Regio	
Rinaldo d'Asti	dramma buffo	2 acts	Jacopo Ferretti (Première libretto, in Italian)	17 February 1816	Rome, Teatro Valle	
Etelinda	melodramma semiserio	2 acts	Gaetano Rossi (Première libretto, in Italian)	26 June 1816	Venice, Teatro San Benedetto	
Claudina in Torino	dramma per musica	2 acts	Giuseppe Maria Foppa (Première libretto, in Italian)	20 December 1816	Venice, Teatro San Moisè	
Fajello	dramma tragico	2 acts	(Première libretto, in Italian)	23 October 1817	Florence	Revision: Gabriella di Vergy, September 1818, Trieste, Teatro Nuovo
Donna Caritea, regina di Spagna	opera seria	2 acts	Giacomo Serafini and Cesare Leopoldo Bixio (Première libretto, in Italian)	7 January 1818	Genoa, Teatro Sant'Agostino	
Elena e Virginio				summer 1818	Trieste	
Atar ossia il serraglio di Ormuz	dramma serio	2 acts	Felice Romani	13 May 1820	Lisbon, Teatro São Carlos	After Tarare by Pierre Beaumarchais and Axur, re d'Ormus by Lorenzo Da Ponte
La festa della rosa	dramma giocoso	2 acts	Gaetano Rossi	13 August 1821	Lisbon, Teatro São Carlos	
Mandane, regina di Persia	opera seria	2 acts	Luigi Romanelli	4 November 1821	Lisbon, Teatro São Carlos	
Elena e Costantino	opera semiseria	2 acts	Andrea Leone Tottola	6 February 1822	Lisbon, Teatro São Carlos	Possibly a revision of Elena e Virginio
Maria Stuarda, regina di Scozia	opera seria	3 acts	Pietro Giannone	7 June 1827	London, King's Theatre	After Schiller's Mary Stuart
L'orfano della selva	melodramma comico	2 acts	Gaetano Rossi (Première libretto, in Italian)	15 November 1828	Milan, Teatro alla Scala	
Rosmonda d'Inghilterra (o Rosmonda)	melodramma serio	2 acts	Felice Romani (Première libretto, in Italian)	28 February 1829	Venice, Teatro La Fenice	
Edoardo in Iscozia (o Edoardo Stuart re in Iscozia)	dramma per musica	2 acts	Domenico Gilardoni (Première libretto, in Italian)	8 May 1831	Naples, Teatro San Carlo	
Enrico di Monfort	melodramma	2 acts	Gaetano Rossi (Première libretto, in Italian)	12 November 1831	Milan, Teatro alla Scala	
Caterina di Guisa	melodramma	2 acts	Felice Romani (Première libretto, in Italian)	14 February 1833	Milan, Teatro alla Scala	After Dumas' Henri III et sa cour Revision: autumn 1836, Turin, Teatro Carignano
La figlia dell'arciere	melodramma tragico	3 acts	Felice Romani (Première libretto, in Italian)	12 January 1834	Naples, Teatro San Carlo	
Marsa (or Marfa)	melodramma	4 acts	Emanuele Bidera	13 July 1835	Naples, Teatro San Carlo	
La solitaria delle Asturie, ossia La Spagna ricuperata	melodramma	5 parti	Felice Romani (Première libretto, in Italian)	6 March 1838	Milan, Teatro alla Scala	
Giovanna II regina di Napoli	melodramma	3 acts	Gaetano Rossi (Première libretto, in Italian)	12 March 1840	Milan, Teatro alla Scala	
Il lago delle fate	melodramma	4 acts	(Première libretto, in Italian)	6 February 1841	Turin, Teatro Regio	
