= Felice Romani =

Italian poet, librettist, and scholar (1788–1865)

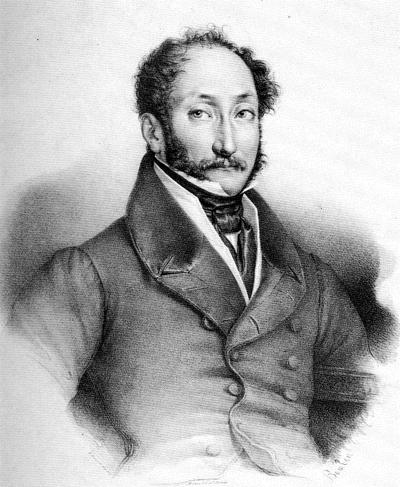
Felice Romani

Giuseppe Felice Romani (31 January 1788 – 28 January 1865) was an Italian poet and scholar of literature and mythology who wrote many librettos for the opera composers Donizetti and Bellini. Romani was considered the finest Italian librettist between Metastasio and Boito.

== Biography ==
Born Giuseppe Felice Romani to a bourgeois family in Genoa, he studied law and literature in Pisa and Genoa. At the University of Genoa he translated French literature and, with a colleague, prepared a six-volume dictionary of mythology and antiquities, including the history of the Celts in Italy. Romani's expertise in French and antiquity is reflected in the libretti he wrote; the majority are based on French literature and many, such as Norma, use mythological sources.

After refusing a post at the University of Genoa, he appears to have travelled to France, Spain, Greece and Germany before returning to Milan in either 1812 or 1813. There he became friends with important figures in the literary and musical world. He turned down the post of court poet in Vienna, and began instead a career as an opera librettist. He wrote two librettos for the composer Simon Mayr, which resulted in his appointment as the librettist for La Scala. Romani became the most highly regarded of all Italian librettists of his age, producing nearly one hundred. In spite of his interest in French literature, he refused to work in Paris.

Romani wrote the librettos for Bellini's Il pirata, La straniera, Zaira, I Capuleti e i Montecchi, La sonnambula, Norma and Beatrice di Tenda, for Rossini's Il turco in Italia and Bianca e Falliero, and Donizetti's Anna Bolena and L'elisir d'amore (which he adapted from Eugène Scribe's Le philtre). He also wrote a libretto (originally for composer Adalbert Gyrowetz) that Verdi used for his early comedy Un giorno di regno.

Romani was considered an ideal match for Bellini, who is quoted as having said: "Give me good verses and I will give you good music". Dramatic, even extravagant "situations" expressed in verses "designed to portray the passions in the liveliest manner" were what Bellini was looking for in a libretto, according to a letter to Francesco Florimo of 4 August 1834, and he found them in Romani.

The two, however, had a falling out over missed deadlines for Beatrice di Tenda. After setting I puritani to a libretto by Carlo Pepoli, Bellini was determined not to compose any more Italian operas with anyone but Romani. I puritani was his last opera; he died less than a year after its première. Romani mourned him deeply and wrote an obituary in which he expressed his profound regrets over their disagreement.

In 1834 Romani became editor of the Gazzetta Ufficiale Piemontese to which he contributed literary criticism. He retained the post, with a break from 1849–1854, until his death, in Moneglia (in the region of Liguria, Italy). A volume of his lyric poems was published in 1841.

== Libretti ==
For each libretto, the composer/s are listed who set it to music, the date of the first performance, and the new title where applicable.

- La rosa bianca e la rosa rossa
  - Simon Mayr (1813)
  - Pietro Generali (1818)
  - Tomás Genovés y Lapetra, Enrico e Clotilde (1831)
- Medea in Corinto
  - Simon Mayr (1813)
  - Prospero Selli (1839)
  - Saverio Mercadante, Medea, revision by Salvadore Cammarano (1851)
- Aureliano in Palmira
  - Gioachino Rossini (1813)
- Atar ossia Il serraglio di Ormus
  - Simon Mayr (1814)
  - Carlo Coccia, Atar ou O serralho de Ormuz (1820)
  - Luiz Antonio Miró, Atar ou O serralho d'Ormus (1836)
- Il turco in Italia
  - Gioachino Rossini (1814)
- Le due duchesse subtitled La caccia ai lupi
  - Simon Mayr (1814)
  - Filippo Celli (1824)
- L'ira di Achille
  - Giuseppe Nicolini (1814)
- La testa di bronzo or La capanna solitaria
  - Carlo Evasio Soliva (1816)
  - Saverio Mercadante (1827)
  - Giacomo Fontemaggi (1835)
  - Vincenzo Mela (1855)
- Maometto
  - Peter Winter (1817)
- Rodrigo di Valenza
  - Pietro Generali (1817)
  - Ferdinando Orlandi (1820)
  - Filippo Chimeri, Elmonda di Valenza (1845)
- Mennone e Zemira
  - Simon Mayr (1817)
- La gioventù di Cesare
  - Stefano Pavesi (1814)
- Le zingare dell'Asturia
  - Carlo Evasio Soliva (1817)
- Adele di Lusignano
  - Michele Carafa (1817)
  - Ramón Carnicer (1819)
- I due Valdomiri
  - Peter Winter (1817)
- Gianni di Parigi
  - Francesco Morlacchi (1818)
  - Giovanni Antonio Speranza (1836)
  - Gaetano Donizetti (set to music 1831, first performance 1839)
- Il finto Stanislao
  - Adalbert Gyrowetz (1818)
  - Giuseppe Verdi, Un giorno di regno (1840)
- Il barone di Dolshein
  - Giovanni Pacini (1818)
  - Franz Schoberlechner (1827)
- Danao
  - Simon Mayr (1818)
  - Giuseppe Persiani, Danao re d'Argo (1827)
- Gl'Illinesi
  - Francesco Basili (1819)
  - Francesco Sampieri (1823)
  - Luigi Viviani, L'eroe francese (1826)
  - Feliciano Strepponi (1829)
  - Pietro Antonio Coppola, Gli Illinesi (1835)
  - Francisco Gomez, Irza (1845)
- Clemenza d'Entragues
  - Vittorio Trento (1819)
- Il falegname di Livonia
  - Giovanni Pacini (1819)
- Il califo e la schiava
  - Francesco Basili (1819)
  - Gioachino Rossini, Adina, revision by Gherardo Bevilacqua Aldobrandini (1826)
  - Giovanni Quaquerini (1842)
- Bianca e Falliero or Il consiglio dei tre
  - Gioachino Rossini (1819)
- Vallace or L'eroe scozzese
  - Giovanni Pacini (1820)
- La sacerdotessa d'Irminsul
  - Giovanni Pacini (1820)
- I due Figaro or Il soggetto di una commedia
  - Michele Carafa (1820)
  - Giovanni Panizza (1824)
  - Dionigi Brogialdi (1825)
  - Saverio Mercadante (composed: 1826/staged: 1835)
  - Giovanni Antonio Speranza (1839)
- Margherita d'Anjou
  - Giacomo Meyerbeer (1820)
- Donna Aurora or Il romanzo all'improvviso
  - Francesco Morlacchi (1821)
- La voce misteriosa
  - Giuseppe Mosca (1821)
  - Carlo Mellara (1823)
- Atalia
  - Simon Mayr (1822)
- L'esule di Granata
  - Giacomo Meyerbeer (1822)
  - Giovanni Tadolini, Almanzor (1827)
- Adele ed Emerico ossia Il posto abbandonato
  - Saverio Mercadante (1822; revised 1826)
- Chiara e Serafina subtitled Il pirata
  - Gaetano Donizetti (1822)
  - Alberto Mazzucato, I corsari, revision by Temistocle Solera (1840)
- Amleto
  - Saverio Mercadante (1822)
- Chi fa così, fa bene
  - Feliciano Strepponi (1823)
- Abufar, ossia La famiglia araba
  - Michele Carafa (1823)
  - Manuel García, El Abufar (1827)
- Francesca da Rimini
  - Feliciano Strepponi (1823)
  - Luigi Carlini (1825)
  - Massimiliano Quilici (1829)
  - Saverio Mercadante (written 1830; unperformed)
  - Giuseppe Staffa (1831)
  - Giuseppe Fournier (1832)
  - Giuseppe Tamburini (1835)
  - Emanuele Borgatta (1837)
  - Francesco Morlacchi (composta nel 1840, incompiuta)
  - Francesco Canneti (1843)
  - Giovanni Franchini (1857)
- Egilda di Provenza
  - Stefano Pavesi (1823)
  - João Evangelista Pereira da Costa, Egilda de Provenca (1827)
- Amina or L'innocenza perseguitata
  - Giuseppe Rastrelli (1824)
  - Antonio d'Antoni (1825)
  - Carlo Valentini, Amina, subtitled L'orfanella di Ginevra, revision by Andrea Leone Tottola (1825)
- Elena e Malvina
  - Carlo Evasio Soliva (1824)
  - Ramón Carnicer, Elena e Malvina (1829)
  - Francesco Vincenzo Schira (1832)
  - Giuseppe Mazza (1834)
  - Egisto Vignozzi (1835)
- Il sonnambulo
  - Michele Carafa (1824)
  - Luigi Ricci (1830)
  - Carlo Valentini (1834)
  - Luiz Antonio Miró, O sonambulo (1835)
  - Salvatore Agnelli, Il fantasma (1842)
  - Giuseppe Persiani, Il fantasma (1843)
- Gli avventurieri
  - Giacomo Cordella (1825)
  - Luigi Felice Rossi (1835)
  - Carlo Valentini (1836)
  - Antonio Buzzolla (1842)
  - Antonio Cagnoni, Amori e trappole, revision by Marco Marcelliano Marcello (1850)
- Giulietta e Romeo
  - Nicola Vaccai (1825)
  - Eugenio Torriani (1828)
  - Vincenzo Bellini, I Capuleti e i Montecchi (1830)
- Il montanaro
  - Saverio Mercadante (1827)
  - Pietro Campiuti, L'incognito (1832)
  - Giovan Battista Cagnola, Il podestà di Gorgonzola (1854)
- La selva d'Hermanstadt
  - Felice Frasi (1827)
- Il pirata
  - Vincenzo Bellini (1827)
- Gastone di Foix
  - Giuseppe Persiani (1827)
  - Franciszek Mirecki, Cornelio Bentivoglio (1844)
- Il divorzio Persiano subtitled Il gran bazzarro di Bassora
  - Pietro Generali (1828)
  - Feliciano Strepponi, L'ullà di Bassora (1831)
  - Giuseppe Gerli, Il pitocco (1834)
  - Giuseppe Mazza (1836)
- I saraceni in Sicilia ovvero Eufemio di Messina
  - Francesco Morlacchi (1828)
  - Daniele Nicelli, Il proscritto di Messina (1829)
  - Giuseppe Persiani, Eufemio di Messina ovvero La distruzione di Catania (1829)
  - Francesco Morlacchi, Il rinnegato (1832)
  - Ramón Carnicer, Eufemio da Messina o Los sarracenos en Sicilia (1832)
  - Alessandro Curmi, Il proscritto di Messina (1843)
  - Angelo Agostini, Il rinnegato (1858)
- Alina, regina di Golconda
  - Gaetano Donizetti (1828)
- Colombo
  - Francesco Morlacchi (1828)
  - Luigi Ricci (1829)
  - Ramón Carnicer, Cristoforo Colombo (1831)
  - Luigi Bottesini, Cristoforo Colombo (1848)
  - Carlo Emanuele De Barbieri, Columbus (1848)
  - Vincenzo Mela, Cristoforo Colombo (1857)
  - Felicita Casella, Cristoforo Colombo (1865)
  - Giuseppe Marcora (1869)
- La straniera
  - Vincenzo Bellini (1829)
- Rosmonda
  - Carlo Coccia (1829)
  - Gaetano Donizetti, Rosmonda d'Inghilterra (1834)
  - Antonio Belisario (1835)
  - Pietro Tonassi e Pietro Collavo, Il castello di Woodstock (1839)
  - Otto Nicolai, Enrico II (1839)
- Saul
  - Nicola Vaccai (1829)
  - Ferdinando Ceccherini (1843)
  - Giovanni Antonio Speranza (1844)
- Zaira
  - Vincenzo Bellini (1829)
  - Alessandro Gandini (1829)
  - Saverio Mercadante (1831)
  - Antonio Mami (1845)
- Giovanna Shore
  - Carlo Conti (1829)
  - Lauro Rossi (1836)
  - Enrico Lacroix (1845)
  - Vincenzo Bonnetti (1853)
- La rappresaglia
  - Saverio Mercadante (1829)
- Bianca di Belmonte
  - Luigi Riesck (1829)
  - Tomás Genovés y Lapetra (1833)
- Annibale in Torino
  - Luigi Ricci (1830)
- Anna Bolena
  - Gaetano Donizetti (1830)
- Il romito di Provenza
  - Pietro Generali (1831)
  - M. A. Sauli (1846)
- La sonnambula
  - Vincenzo Bellini (1831)
- Il disertore svizzero aka La nostalgia
  - Cesare Pugni (1831)
  - Lauro Rossi (1832)
  - Angelo Pellegrini (1841)
  - Giovanni Battista Meiners (1842)
- La neve
  - Luigi Ricci (1831)
- Norma
  - Vincenzo Bellini (1831)
- I normanni a Parigi
  - Saverio Mercadante (1832)
- Ugo, Conte di Parigi
  - Gaetano Donizetti (1832)
  - Alberto Mazzucato (1843)
- L'elisir d'amore
  - Gaetano Donizetti (1832)
- Ismalia ossia Morte ed amore
  - Saverio Mercadante (1832)
  - Ramón Carnicer (1838)
  - Vicenc Cuyás y Borés, La fattucchiera (1838)
- Il segreto
  - Luigi Maiocchi (1833)
  - Placido Mandanici (1836)
- Caterina di Guisa
  - Carlo Coccia (1833)
  - Giuseppe Mazza (1836)
  - Luigi Savi (1838)
  - Fabio Campana (1838)
  - Francesco Chiaromonte (1850)
  - Antonio Gandolfi (1859)
  - Cenobio Paniagua y Vasques (1859)
  - Beniamino Rossi (1861)
  - Giacomo Nascimbene, Enrico di Guisa (1868)
- Il conte d'Essex
  - Saverio Mercadante (1833)
- Parisina
  - Gaetano Donizetti (1833)
  - Tomás Giribaldi (1878)
- Beatrice di Tenda
  - Vincenzo Bellini (1833)
  - Rinaldo Ticci (1837)
  - Frederico Guimarães, Beatriz (1882)
- Il contrabbandiere
  - Cesare Pugni (1833)
  - Natale Perelli (1842)
- I due sergenti
  - Luigi Ricci (1833)
  - Alberto Mazzucato (1841)
  - Gualtiero Sanelli (1842)
- Lucrezia Borgia
  - Gaetano Donizetti (1833)
- La figlia dell'arciere
  - Carlo Coccia, atto III di Domenico Andreotti (1834)
  - Gaetano Donizetti, Adelia, Third Act by Girolamo Maria Marini (1841)
  - Carlo Pedrotti (1844)
  - Valdemaro de Barbarikine, Adelia (1877)
- Un'avventura di Scaramuccia
  - Luigi Ricci (1834)
- Emma d'Antiochia
  - Saverio Mercadante (1834)
  - Giovanni Bracciolini, Emma e Ruggero (1838)
  - Vincenzo Pontani, Emma e Ruggero (1852)
  - Carlo Lovati-Cozzulani, Alda (1866)
  - Ercole Cavazza, Emma (1877)
- Un episodio del San Michele
  - Cesare Pugni (1834)
  - Giuseppe Concone (1836)
  - Luigi Savi, L'avaro (1840)
  - Ermanno Picchi, Il tre di novembre (1844)
  - Giuseppe Lombardini, La sartina e l'usurajo (1853)
  - Pietro Repetto, Un episodio del San Michele (1855)
  - Guglielmo Quarenghi, Il dì di San Michele (1863)
  - Carlo Brizzi, L'avaro (1877)
- Uggero il danese
  - Saverio Mercadante (1834)
- La gioventù di Enrico V
  - Saverio Mercadante (1834)
- Francesca Donato subtitled Corinto distrutta
  - Saverio Mercadante (1835)
  - Pietro Raimondi (1842)
- Odio e amore
  - Mariano Obiols (1837)
  - Alfonso Cosentino, Laurina (1858)
- La solitaria delle Asturie or La Spagna ricuperata
  - Carlo Coccia (1838)
  - Saverio Mercadante (1840)
  - Luigi Ricci (1845)
  - Giuseppe Sordelli (1846)
  - Giuseppe Winter, Matilde di Scozia (1852)
- La spia ovvero Il merciaiuolo americano
  - Angelo Villanis (1850)
- Edita di Lorno
  - Giulio Litta (1853)
- Cristina di Svezia
  - Sigismond Thalberg (1855)
