= Murder Will Out =

Murder Will Out may refer to:

- Murder Will Out (1899 film), a lost 1899 French silent film by Georges Méliès
- Murder Will Out (1930 film), a 1930 American drama film starring Jack Mulhall
- Murder Will Out (1939 film), a 1939 British crime film starring Jack Hawkins
- The Voice of Merrill, 1952 British film released under this title in the U.S.
- "Murder Will Out", a sequence in the 1930 film revue Paramount on Parade
- Murder Will Out, original title of an English adaptation of the 1814 French play The Dog of Montarges
- Murder Will Out, an 1860 novel by Elizabeth Caroline Grey
- Murder Will Out, a 1932 mystery novel by Murray Leinster (as Will F. Jenkins)
- "Murder Will Out": The Detective in Fiction, a 1990 book by T. J. Binyon
