= Isabella Fabbrica =

Italian opera singer

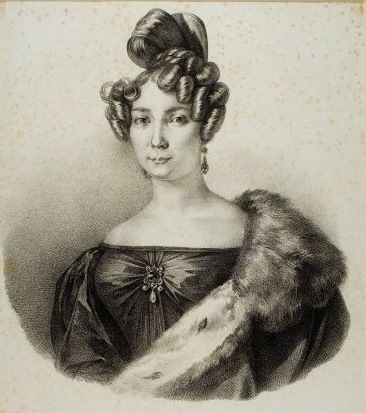
Isabella Fabbrica c. 1830

Isabella Fabbrica (Milan, c. 1802 – Turin, c. 1860) was an Italian operatic contralto.

Just after completing her studies at the Milan Conservatory, she made her debut in 1822 at La Scala, as Emerico in the première of Mercadante's Adele ed Emerico. The opera obtained a good success and this facilitated the career of Isabella Fabbrica, which in the same year interpreted other premières of operas of Donizetti (Chiara e Serafina) and Mercadante (Amleto).

After a few years spent mainly between Milan and Turin, she married, after dropping a possible union with Mercadante, the tenor Giovanni Battista Montresor, son of the contralto Adelaide Malanotte.

After her debut in Rome in 1830, she spent some years in Portugal, where she obtained an extraordinary success. Later Fabbrica sang also in Madrid and Saint Petersburg, until 1850, when she ceased her activity.

Isabella Fabbrica was very famous for her talents as an actress and for her powerful voice.

== Roles created ==
- Emerico in Mercadante's Adele ed Emerico (1822)
- Chiara in Donizetti's Chiara e Serafina (1822)
- Amleto in Mercadante's Amleto (1822)
- Giulia in Pacini's La vestale (1823)
- Demetrio in Mayr's Demetrio (1823)
- Alcibiade in Cordella's Alcibiade (1824)
- Romeo in Vaccai's Giulietta e Romeo (1825)
- Arturo in Coccia's Caterina di Guisa (1833)
