= List of compositions by Niels Viggo Bentzon =

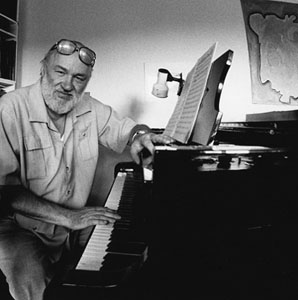

This is a list of compositions by Niels Viggo Bentzon.

== Pieces with opus number ==
- Op. 1 – Fantasy (Klaviermusik No. 1); for piano
- Op. 2 – Klaviermusik No. 2
- Op. 3 – Small Pieces (7); for piano
- Op. 4 – Violin Sonata No. 1
- Op. 5 – Variations (8) on a Folk Dance; for flute solo
- Op. 6 – Trio No. 1; for violin, viola, and cello
- Op. 7a – Klavermusik No. 4; for piano
- Op. 7b – Klavermusik No. 5; for piano
- Op. 8 – Klavermusik No. 6; for piano
- (Op. 9) – Duo; for violin and cello (incomplete)
- Op. 9 – String Quartet No. 1
- Op. 10 – Toccata; for piano
- Op. 11 – Sonatine; for piano
- Op. 12 – Quintet; for flute, oboe, clarinet, bassoon, and piano
- Op. 13 – Prelude, Intermezzo, and Fugue; for organ
- Op. 14 – Overture; for chamber orchestra
- Op. 15 – Rhapsody; for piano
- Op. 16
- Op. 17 – Variations (6) on a Theme; for flute and piano
- Op. 18 – Suite and Variations; violin solo
- Op. 19 – Divertimento; for strings
- Op. 20 – Trio No. 2; for flute, oboe, and piano
- Op. 21 – Variations; for wind quintet
- Op. 22 – Symphony No. 1
- Op. 23 – Bagatelles (4); for piano
- Op. 24 – Violin Sonata No. 2
- Op. 25 – Trio; violin, cello, and piano
- Op. 26 – Quartet; for flute, oboe, horn, and bassoon
- Op. 27 – Orchestra Sonata; for flute and strings
- Op. 28 – Capriccietta; for violin and piano
- Op. 29 – Wind Quintet No. 3
- Op. 30 – Violin Sonata No. 3
- Op. 31 – Passacaglia; for piano
- Op. 32 – Bagatelle; for string quartet
- Op. 33 – Music for seven instruments; instrumentation unknown
- Op. 33 – Quintet; for violin, clarinet, cello, piano, and guitar
- Op. 34 – Study; for double bass solo
- Op. 35 – √3; for violin and piano
- Op. 36 – Symphony No. 2
- Op. 37 – Prelude and Fugue; for piano
- Op. 38 – Partita; for piano
- Op. 39 – String Quartet No. 2
- Op. 40 – Concert Etude; for piano (originally Piano Sonata No. 1)
- Op. 41 – Pieces (2); for oboe and piano
- Op. 42 – Piano Sonata No. 2
- Op. 43 – Cello Sonata No. 1
- Op. 44 – Piano Sonata No. 3
- Op. 45 – Dance Pieces (3); for piano
- Op. 46 – Symphony No. 3
- Op. 47 – Horn Sonata
- Op. 48 – Concert Etudes (3); for piano
- Op. 49 – Piano Concerto No. 1
- Op. 50 – Inventions (5); for piano
- Op. 51 – Sonata No. 1; for two pianos
- Op. 52 – Chamber Concert; for 11 instruments
- Op. 53 – Sonatina; for violin solo
- Op. 54 – Mosaique Musicale; for flute, violin, cello, and piano
- Op. 55 – Symphony No. 4 Metamorphosis
- Op. 56 – Prelude and Rondo; for chamber orchestra
- Op. 57 – Piano Sonata No. 4
- Op. 58 – Metaphor Ballet-Suite; for orchestra
- Op. 59 – Wind Quintet No. 4
- Op. 60 – Lille Suite; for strings
- Op. 61 – Symphony No. 5 Ellipse
- Op. 62 – Sonatine; for piano
- Op. 63 – Clarinet Sonata
- Op. 64 – Intrada; for orchestra
- Op. 65 – Woodcuts (11); for piano
- Op. 66 – Symphony No. 6
- Op. 67 – Hornbækiana Suite; for violin and piano
- Op. 68 – Nocturnes (2); for piano
- Op. 69 – Piccolo-Concerto; for piano and strings
- Op. 70 – Violin Concerto No. 1
- Op. 71 – English Horn Sonata
- Op. 72 – String Quartet No. 3
- Op. 73 – Trumpet Sonata
- Op. 74 – Oboe Concerto
- Op. 75 – Variazioni Breve; for orchestra
- Op. 76 – Ballads (3); for mezzo-soprano and piano
- Op. 77 – Piano Sonata No. 5
- Op. 78 – Prologue, Rondo, and Epilogue; for 4H piano
- Op. 79 – Songs (2); for soprano and piano
- Op. 80 – Woodwind Quintet
- Op. 81 – Prologue, Dialogue, and Epilogue; for flute and piano
- Op. 82 – Trio; for trumpet, horn, and trombone
- Op. 83 – Symphony No. 7
- Op. 84 – Duo; for violin and cello
- Op. 85 – Capriccio; for piano
- Op. 86 – Kaleidoscope; for piano
- Op. 87 – Piano Concerto No. 3
- Op. 88 – Elegy; for clarinet, bassoon, violin, viola, cello, and double-bass
- Op. 89 – Kurtisanen, ballet
- Op. 90 – Piano Sonata No. 6
- Op. 91 – Quartet; for flute, oboe, bassoon, and piano
- Op. 92 – Symphonic Variations; for orchestra
- Op. 93 – Variations; for flute solo
- Op. 94 – Triple Concerto; for oboe, clarinet, bassoon, and strings
- Op. 95 – String Quartet No. 4
- Op. 96 – Piano Concerto No. 4
- Op. 97 – Pentachord; for piano
- Op. 98 – Theme and Variation; for English horn, violin, and cello
- Op. 99a – Piece; 12 pianos
- Op. 99b – Fantasy and Rondo; for flute and piano
- Op. 100 – Sinfonia Concertante; for violin, viola, cello, clarinet and ensemble
- Op. 101 – Symphonic Suite; for orchestra
- Op. 102 – Suite; for piano
- Op. 103 – Variations (14); for organ
- Op. 104 – Simple Variations (13); for piano
- Op. 105 – String Quartet No. 5
- Op. 106 – Cello Concerto No. 1
- Op. 107 – Pastorale; for orchestra
- Op. 108 – Concertino Hommage to Mozart; for orchestra
- Op. 109 – Pezzi Sinfonici; for orchestra
- Op. 110 – Sonata; for cello solo
- Op. 111 – Pieces (9); for violin and viola
- Op. 112 – Preludes (12); for piano
- Op. 113 – Symphony No. 8 'Sinfonia Discrezione'
- Op. 114 – Concerto per Archi; for strings
- Op. 115 – Concerto; for 6 percussionists
- Op. 116 – Woodwind Quintet No. 5
- Op. 117 – Sonata; for 4H piano
- Op. 118 – Trio; for violin, cello, and piano
- Op. 119 – Symphonic Fantasy; for 2 pianos and orchestra
- Op. 120 – Elementi Aperti, for mezzo-soprano and orchestra
- Op. 121 – Piano Sonata No. 7
- Op. 122 – Violin Sonata No. 4
- Op. 123 – Mutations; for orchestra
- Op. 124 – String Quartet No. 6
- Op. 125 – Mobiles (5); for orchestra
- Op. 126 – Symphony No. 9
- Op. 127 – 2 Monkton-Blues, for orchestra
- Op. 128 – Macbeth; dramatic work
- Op. 129 – Propostae Novae; for 2 pianos
- Op. 130 – Quintet; for flute, violin, viola, cello, and piano
- Op. 131 – Rhapsody; for piano and orchestra
- Op. 132 – Torquilla; oratorio for narrator, SATB soloists, chorus, and orchestra
- Op. 133 – Ostinato; for orchestra
- Op. 134 – Trio; for clarinet, cello, and piano
- Op. 135 – Alleluia; for soprano and organ
- Op. 136 – Violin Concerto No. 2
- Op. 137 – Overture; for small orchestra
- Op. 138 – Bonjour Max Ernest; cantata for chorus and small orchestra
- Op. 139 – Sinfonia da Camera; for chamber orchestra
- Op. 140 – Epitaph; for piano
- Op. 141 – Døren; dramatic work
- Op. 142 – Papuanerdans; for two pianos
- Op. 143 – Sonatine; for two pianos
- Op. 144 – Faust III; opera
- Op. 145 – Koralforspil (3); for organ
- Op. 146 – Accordion Concerto
- Op. 147 – Flute Concerto No. 1
- Op. 148 – Concerto for Orchestra
- Op. 149 – Piano Concerto No. 5
- Op. 150 – Symphony No. 10 Den Hymniske
- Op. 151 – Ballet-Suite Hommage to Jean-Baptiste Lully; for piano
- Op. 152 – Legend; for TB chorus and small ensemble
- Op. 153 – Meet the Danes; for orchestra
- Op. 154 – Suite for Foreigners; for orchestra
- Op. 155 – Overture for the Joyful Ladies of Windsor; for orchestra
- Op. 156 – An Arab in Cologne; for narrator and small ensemble
- Op. 157 – The Tempered Piano vol. 1
- Op. 158 – Symphony No. 11 Salzburg
- Op. 159 – Two-part Inventions (15); for piano
- Op. 160 – Three-part Inventions (15); for piano
- Op. 161 – Puppets menuet and other Miniatures for Children (9); for piano
- Op. 162 – Vignettes (2); for piano
- Op. 163 – Spanish Portraits (3); for piano
- Op. 164 – In the Zoo; for accordion
- Op. 165 – String Quartet No. 7
- Op. 166 – Symphony No. 12 Tunis
- Op. 167 – Copenhagen Concert No. 1; for strings
- Op. 168 – Copenhagen Concert No. 2; for strings
- Op. 169 – Copenhagen Concert No. 3; for strings
- Op. 170
- Op. 171
- Op. 172
- Op. 173 – Fredericksburg Suite No. 1; for piano
- Op. 174 – Fredericksburg Suite No. 2; for piano
- Op. 175 – Small Preludes (10); for piano
- Op. 176 – Concerto; for violin, piano, and percussion
- Op. 177 – Jenny Von Westphalen; ballet
- Op. 178 – Sinfonia Concertante No. 1; for 6 accordions and orchestra
- Op. 179 – Stream Music No. 3; for alto sax, trumpet, contrabass, piano, and perc.
- Op. 179 – Montmartre Concert; for piano (graphic notation)
- Op. 180 – Sonatina; for recorder and harpsichord
- Op. 181 – Symphony No. 13 Military
- Op. 182 – Henry Miller Suite; for cello
- Op. 183 – Violin Sonata No. 5
- Op. 183 – Symphony No. 14 (incomplete)
- Op. 184 – Benumbing Experience; for mixed ensemble
- Op. 185 – Chemical Madrigals; for mixed chorus a capella
- Op. 186 – Spawn, Mycological Suite; for organ
- Op. 187 – Iron Music; for prepared piano, untuned piano, harpsichord
- Op. 188 – Trivial Synonyms; for piano and actor (graphic notation)
- Op. 189 – Clothing Music; for keyboards and requisites (graphic notation)
- Op. 190 – Treasured Monuments; for two pianos w/ preparation, harpsichord, etc.
- Op. 191 – Glazier's Model; for piano (graphic notation)
- Op. 192 – Variable Music for Danish State Radio; for big band and narrator
- Op. 193 – Piano Sonata No. 8 Faust
- Op. 194 – Piano Sonata No. 9
- Op. 195 – Piano Concerto No. 6
- Op. 196 – Quintet; for string quartet and piano
- Op. 197 – Bijouteri; for vocals, piano, and instruments (graphic notation)
- Op. 198 – European Vitality; for vocals, piano, and instruments (graphic notation)
- Op. 199 – Muhammedansk Document; for chorus and actors (graphic notation)
- Op. 200 – Poetic Sonatine; for oboe solo
- Op. 201 – Mali; for soprano, two percussionists, and piano
- Op. 202 – Ecossaises, for piano
- Op. 203 – Trio; violin, viola, and cello
- Op. 204 – Piano Sonata No. 10 (incomplete)
- Op. 205 – Intelligence and Landscape; for piano (graphic notation)
- Op. 206
- Op. 207 – Ballet 800 Years; for piano
- Op. 208
- Op. 209 – Hazardous Suite; for piano
- Op. 210 – Ballade; for piano
- Op. 211 – Fantasy-Impromptu; for G flute
- Op. 212 – Noble and Sentimental Waltzes (6); for piano
- Op. 213 – Mazurkas (5); for piano
- Op. 214 – Nocturnes in Colors (8); for piano
- Op. 215 – Barcarole; for piano
- Op. 216 – Etudes (7); for piano
- Op. 217 – Camp Duo; for cello and flute
- Op. 218 – Scherzo, for piano
- Op. 219 – Rondo Amoroso, for piano
- Op. 220 – Manfred Overture; for orchestra
- Op. 221 – Columbus eier Salt and Pepper; for accordion
- Op. 222 – European Form and Coda; for piano
- Op. 223 – Cello Sonata No. 2
- Op. 224 – Heroic Piece; for three pianos
- Op. 225 – Concerto; for recorder and other instruments
- Op. 226 – Concerto; for viola da gamba and other instruments
- Op. 227 – Explosions; for two pianos
- Op. 228 – String Quartet No. 8 Dartmouth
- Op. 229 – Symphonic Paraphrase, for orchestra
- Op. 230 – Paraphrase on Aarhus Tappenstreg, for piano and orchestra
- Op. 231 – Mini-Symphony; for chamber orchestra
- Op. 232 – String Quartet No. 9
- Op. 233 – Toccata, Aria, and Fugue, for organ
- Op. 234 – Aria with Variations, for spinet
- Op. 235 – Maximillian 1 Suite, for violin and piano
- Op. 236 – Canon Photographs Duet, for viola and piano
- Op. 237 – Duet, for viola and organ
- Op. 238 – Pan on Defensive, An Open Air Sketch, for organ
- Op. 239 – In the Forest Suite, for horn solo
- Op. 240 – Shelley Songs (18), for voice and piano
- Op. 241 – Paganini Variations, for piano
- Op. 242 – Mozart Variations, for piano
- Op. 243 – Piano Concerto No. 7
- Op. 244 – Eastern Gasworks No. 2; for orchestra
- Op. 245 – Bonner Sonata, for piano
- Op. 246 – Vibrations, for prepared piano (graphic notation)
- Op. 247 – Chorus Daniensis No. 2; for piano and orchestra
- Op. 248 – Hofmann Sonata; for piano
- Op. 249 – Chorus Daniensis, for ensemble
- Op. 250 – Vibrations (2nd Version), for prepared piano
- Op. 251
- Op. 251 – Psycho-biological Music; for electronics
- Op. 252 – Songs without Words (4), for piano
- Op. 253 – Italian Comedies (3), for piano
- Op. 254 – Serapion Brothers, for piano
- Op. 255 – Mini Cantata, for children's chorus and percussion (graphic notation)
- Op. 256 – Peep Show, for piano
- Op. 257 – Sonata for 12 instruments; for large ensemble
- Op. 258 – The Plant Garden, opera (incomplete)
- Op. 259 – Duarder Suite, for accordion and percussion
- Op. 260 – Trio, for clarinet, cello, and piano
- Op. 261 – Formula; for orchestra
- Op. 262 – Window Music, for chorus and orchestra
- Op. 263 – Napoleon Sonata, piano
- Op. 264 – Rossini Sonata, piano
- Op. 265 – Devrient Sonata, for piano
- Op. 266 – Extracts; for orchestra (graphic notation)
- Op. 266 – Sonatine in B, for 4H cembalo
- Op. 267 – Busonism Audiovisual Concert Piece; for piano and orchestra
- Op. 268 – Cello Sonata No. 3
- Op. 269 – Clarinet Concerto No. 1
- Op. 270 – Overture and Epilogue for Jenny von Westphalen, for orchestra
- Op. 271 – Julienne, for cello and piano (graphic notation)
- Op. 272 – Epitaph for Igor Stravinsky; for orchestra
- Op. 273 – Pavane, for piano
- Op. 274 – Grosses Trio, for flute, cello, and piano
- Op. 275 – Turkey, Cartography Sonata, for piano
- Op. 275 – Violin Concerto No. 3 Paganini Concerto (incomplete)
- Op. 276 – Choral Songs from Authentic Texts (2), for chorus a capella
- Op. 277 – Trombone Sonata
- Op. 278 – Sextet; for piano and woodwind quintet
- Op. 279 – Pollution Ballad, for mixed chorus
- Op. 280 – Violin sonata No. 6
- Op. 281 – Hommage to Picasso, for piano
- Op. 282 – Hommage to César Franck, for flute and piano
- Op. 283 – La Menagerie Roullier, Cantata, for narrator and instruments
- Op. 284 – Text Sonata, for piano
- Op. 285 – Zeit 17, Interlude, Zeit 18, for voice and string quartet
- Op. 286 – Suite Royal; for wind orchestra
- Op. 287 - Emil Kraepelin Study, for violin solo
- Op. 288 – Lyrical Songs (2), for voice and piano
- Op. 289 – Cello Sonata No. 4
- Op. 290 – Statics, for cello solo
- Op. 291 – Organon Phlenomegno Germanico, for piano
- Op. 292 – Melody and Rhythm, for accordion
- Op. 293 – Purist Variations (9), for piano
- Op. 294 – Saltholm, for orchestra
- Op. 295 – Otto von Guericke Suite, for piano
- Op. 296 – Abstracts, for piano
- Op. 297 – Substance, for piano
- Op. 298 – Improvement and Completion in Concert, for piano
- Op. 299
- Op. 300
- Op. 301 – Trio, for flute, cembalo, and piano
- Op. 302 – Galilæi, for chamber ensemble
- Op. 303 – Viola Concerto
- Op. 304
- Op. 305 – After-Dinner Concert, for piano
- Op. 306 – Suite as Far as Jazz is Concerned, for big band
- Op. 307
- Op. 308
- Op. 309
- Op. 310 – Charming Sound, for chamber ensemble
- Op. 311 – Cello Concerto No. 2
- Op. 312 – From My London Diary, for piano
- Op. 313 – Document 5 No. 1 for orchestra (graphic notation)
- Op. 314 – Flute Sonata?
- Op. 315 – Document 5 No. 2 for orchestra (graphic notation)
- Op. 316 – Bassoon Sonata
- Op. 317 – Sydsjællandske Sonata, for piano
- Op. 318 – Suite, for cello and piano
- Op. 319 – Violin Sonata No. 7
- Op. 320 – Alto Sax Sonata
- Op. 321 – 2nd Collection of Preludes (10), for piano
- Op. 322 – Suite, for violin and piano
- Op. 323 – Micro-Marco, for piano
- Op. 324 – Study on the G-String of Paganini's Violin, for violin solo
- Op. 325 – Solo Element, for piano
- Op. 326 – Piano Sonata No. 11 The Italian
- Op. 327 – Duo Concertante, for violin and piano
- Op. 328 – The Automaton; opera
- Op. 329 – Wittgenstein Piece, for violin and piano
- Op. 330 – 3 Sonatas and Partitas; violin solo
- Op. 331 – Dar-es-Sallam, for violin and piano
- Op. 332 – Sketches (6), for cello solo
- Op. 333 – Observations. Psycho-biological Suite, for flute, oboe and piano
- Op. 334 – Bones and Flesh Concerto, for two pianos
- Op. 335 – Sounds and Silhouettes, for piano, double-bass (graphic notation)
- Op. 336 – Piano Sonata No. 12
- Op. 337 – The Hoopoe; for chamber orchestra
- Op. 338 – String Quartet No. 10
- Op. 339 – Pupitre 14; for chamber orchestra
- Op. 340 – Sonare Quartet, for recorder, oboe, viola da gamba, and spinet
- Op. 341 – Pianists and Protestors, for piano (incomplete)
- Op. 342 – Joseph von Eichendorff Cycle, for baritone and piano (incomplete)
- Op. 343 – Duettino, for flute and English horn
- Op. 344 – Happy Birthday, for piano
- Op. 345 – Flute Quartet No. 1
- Op. 346 – Four Activities; for SSA chorus
- Op. 347 – Cathegoriæ sacrale No. 1, for chorus
- Op. 348 – Piano Sonata No. 13
- Op. 348 – Bird Song Suite, for piano (graphic notation)
- Op. 349 – Popular Organization No. 1, dedicated to Niels Henrik Nielsen, for organ
- Op. 350 – Popular Organization No. 2, dedicated to Charley Olsen, for organ
- Op. 351 – Popular Organization No. 3, dedicated to Grethe Krogh, for organ
- Op. 352 – Popular Organization No. 4, dedicated to Flemming Dreisig, for organ
- Op. 353 – Dialect, for violin and accordion (graphic notation)
- Op. 354 – Variations on The Volga Boatman; for cello
- Op. 355 – The Bank Manager, opera
- Op. 356 – Chamber Sonata No. 1, for two flutes and organ
- Op. 357 – Chronicle on René Descartes; for orchestra
- Op. 358 – Sonata No. 1, for cello solo
- Op. 359 – Sonata No. 2, for cello solo
- Op. 360 – Sonata No. 3, for cello solo
- Op. 361 – Sonata No. 4, for cello solo (incomplete)
- Op. 362 – Sonata No. 5, for cello solo (incomplete)
- Op. 363 – Sonata No. 6, for cello solo (incomplete)
- Op. 364 – Sonata Popular; for organ and chamber orchestra
- Op. 365 – Dialogue til en horst; for ???
- Op. 366 – Danmark's Cantata; for SATB soloists, choir, and orchestra
- Op. 367 – Stills; for piano and orchestra (incomplete)
- Op. 368 – Flute Quartet No. 2
- Op. 369 – Chropiamonos, for mouth organ and piano
- Op. 370 – Crete, Ancient Variations, for piano
- Op. 371 – Jazz at a Conservatory; for piano
- Op. 372 – Chamber Sonata No. 2, for two flutes and organ
- Op. 373 – Tuba Concerto
- Op. 374 – Violin Concerto No. 4
- Op. 375 – Concerto for Three Types of Clarinet (B, Eb, and Bass)
- Op. 376 – Trio, for violin, cello, and piano
- Op. 377 – Duet, for flute and bassoon
- Op. 378 – Sinfonietta; for brass and percussion
- Op. 379 – The Tempered Piano vol. 2
- Op. 380 – Quartet, for two flutes, bassoon, and cembalo
- Op. 381 – Hommage to Hegel, for flute solo
- Op. 382 – Confirmation Music, for organ
- Op. 383 – Leipzigertage; for piano and orchestra
- Op. 384 – Overture, for piano
- Op. 385 – Flute Quartet No. 3
- Op. 386 – Concerto; for flute and strings
- Op. 387 – Military Marches (3), for wind orchestra
- Op. 388 – Flute Concerto No. 2
- Op. 389 – Bitter Skiffle, for flute, bass flute, and piano
- Op. 390 – Sinfonia Concertante No. 2; for wind quintet and orchestra
- Op. 391 – Symmetrical Sonata, for recorder solo
- Op. 392 – String Quartet No. 11
- Op. 393 – Tuba Sonata
- Op. 394 – Hula-hula Compositions (5), for brass and percussion
- Op. 395 – Hula-hula Compositions (2), for winds and percussion
- Op. 396 – Capriccio; for tuba and orchestra
- Op. 397 – Prelude, for two pianos
- Op. 398 – Study, for seven electric pianos
- Op. 399 – Chimes All Over the World, for electronic tape
- Op. 400 – The Tempered Piano vol. 3
- Op. 401 – Toleranza; for small brass ensemble
- Op. 402 – Sinfonia; for chamber orchestra
- Op. 403 – Hommage to Joseph Beuys (7), various instruments and piano
- Op. 404 – Duell, ballet
- Op. 405 – Quintet; for 4 flutes and piano Spaghetti
- Op. 406 – Sonata, for flute and organ
- Op. 407 – Nocturne, for violin, cello, accordion, 4H piano, and percussion
- Op. 408 – Sonata No. 2, for flute and organ
- Op. 409 – The Tempered Piano vol. 4
- Op. 410 – Vasco de Gama, for piano
- Op. 411 – Punktum Finale; for orchestra
- Op. 412 – Diatonic Sonata, for tuba and wind quintet
- Op. 413 – Something for a Workshop, for chamber ensemble
- Op. 414 – Adagio; for flute and organ
- Op. 415 – Sarcasm, for flute, piccolo, and organ
- Op. 416 – Hommage to Zurich, Dadaist Suite, for MS, flute, viola, and cello
- Op. 417 – Sonata; for violin, viola, cello, and piano
- Op. 418 – We All Have Some Delay; for brass quintet (semi-aleatoric)
- Op. 419 – Baroque Concerto, for oboe and strings
- Op. 420 – Joseph Beuys Sonata, for piano or prepared piano
- Op. 421 – Knaldperle; for orchestra
- Op. 422 – Viola Sonata
- Op. 423 – Hommage to Man Ray, for flute and piano
- Op. 424 – Variations on The Missing Mouse, for piccolo
- Op. 425 – Hans (Jean) Arp Sonata, for piano and electronic tape
- Op. 426 – Preludes and Fugues (17), for organ
- Op. 426 – In Memory of George Maciunas, for piano and electric piano
- Op. 426 – Breakdown, no instrumentation
- Op. 427 – 1.5 Fugue, for cello and piano
- Op. 428 – The Tempered Piano vol. 5
- Op. 429 - Barraque Dull Odde Suite, for piano
- Op. 430 – In an Atmosphere of Italian Futurism, for orchestra
- Op. 431 – Hyfer, for marimba
- Op. 432 – Symphony No. 15 Marrakesh
- Op. 433 – Dance and Counter-Dance (5), for 4H piano
- Op. 434 – Fragment, for orchestra
- Op. 435 – Pieces (2), for piano
- Op. 436 – Ultra-Short Pieces (8), for piano
- Op. 437 – Organ Sonata No. 1
- Op. 438 – Variazioni Senza Tema; for piano and orchestra
- Op. 439 – Klavierstykke, for piano
- Op. 440 – Trilogy, for piano
- Op. 441 – Piano Sonata No. 14
- Op. 442 – A Psalm and a Poem; for SATB chorus and orchestra
- Op. 443 – Pariser Suite, for piano
- Op. 444 – Cello Concerto No. 3
- Op. 445 – Horn Concerto
- Op. 446 – Sonata No. 2; for two pianos
- Op. 447 – Piano Sonata No. 15 Salzburg
- Op. 448 - Annæ-piece, for cello and piano
- Op. 449 – Theme With Variations; for two pianos
- Op. 450 – Piano Concerto No. 8
- Op. 451 – Observations. Psycho-biological Suite, for flute, oboe and piano (rev.)
- Op. 452 – Piece for Television, for oboe, horn, violin, cello, and piano
- Op. 453 – Violin Concerto No. 3
- Op. 454 – Waltzes (3), for two pianos
- Op. 455 – Reflections, for organ
- Op. 456 – Piano Sonata No. 16
- Op. 457 – Piano Sonata No. 17
- Op. 458 – Inventions (21); for organ
- Op. 459 – Piano Sonata No. 18
- Op. 460 – Piano Sonata No. 19
- Op. 461 – Piano Sonata No. 20
- Op. 462 – Piano Sonata No. 21
- Op. 463 – Psalms (20), for mixed chorus and organ
- Op. 464 – Etudes (16); for cello
- Op. 465 – Mimosas, for organ
- Op. 466 – Easy Sonata, for two pianos
- Op. 467 – Bokkenheuser Elegy, 4H Piano
- Op. 468 – Piano Sonata No. 22
- Op. 469 – DSB Overture; for brass or wind band
- Op. 470 – The Tempered Piano vol. 6
- Op. 471 – Emancipation, for alto sax and piano
- Op. 472 – Ultra-short Pieces (33), for piano
- Op. 473 – Chromatic Sonatina, for piano
- Op. 474 – Climatic Changes; for baritone sax, piano, and chamber ensemble
- Op. 475 – Hommage to Pierre Boulez, for two pianos
- Op. 476 – Hyldest til Ærø, for piano
- Op. 477 – Quartetto Brioso, for flute, violin, viola, and cello
- Op. 478 – Soprano Sax Sonata
- Op. 479 – Theme and Variations, for 4H piano
- Op. 480 – Piece, for soprano sax solo
- Op. 481 – Termalen, for voice, cello, and piano
- Op. 482 – Concerto No. 2, for 2 pianos and orchestra
- Op. 483 – Concertino; for piano, woodwinds, and percussion
- Op. 484 – Tenor Sax Sonata
- Op. 485 – Baritone Sax Sonata
- Op. 486 – Soloists Duo, for two pianos
- Op. 487 – Alceste Overture, for two pianos
- Op. 488 – Concerto; for reduced string section
- Op. 489 – Song Cycle, for soprano and guitar
- Op. 490 – Motivation, for carillon
- Op. 491 – Pezzo I, Pezzo II, for piano
- Op. 492 – Quasi una Passacaglia; for organ
- Op. 493 – Duettino, for flute and guitar
- Op. 494 – Jubilee Prelude, for organ
- Op. 495 – Forest Pieces (6); for piano
- Op. 496 – Amalgam, for two pianos
- Op. 497 – Music of the Firebirds, for 4H Piano
- Op. 498 – Sonatina, for alto sax and piano
- Op. 499 – Spies Composition, for two trumpets and piano
- Op. 500 – Savanorola, opera
- Op. 501 – Institute for Humanistic Studies Composition, for two flutes and piano
- Op. 502 – Sonata, for flute and guitar
- Op. 503 – Sonata, for harp solo
- Op. 504 – Plankton; for 2 pianos and large ensemble
- Op. 505 – Løgumkloster Suite, for piano
- Op. 506 – Goldberg Variations, No. 2, for piano
- Op. 507 – String Quartet in One Movement
- Op. 508 – Ohm, for 4H piano
- Op. 509 – Symphony No. 16
- Op. 510 – Oboe Sonata
- Op. 511 – Surroundings, for string quartet
- Op. 512 – Star Tour Hymn, for piano
- Op. 513 – Airplane March, for piano
- Op. 514 – DSB Gavotte; for violin, cello, and piano
- Op. 515 – Sometimes OK, for ???
- Op. 516
- Op. 517
- Op. 518 – Water Level, for 4H piano
- Op. 519 – String Quartet No. 14
- Op. 520 – The Wild Painter, for three flutes
- Op. 521 – Mini Cantata, for recitative, violin, clarinet, and piano
- Op. 522 – Symphony No. 17
- Op. 523 – Symphony No. 18
- Op. 524 – Symphony No. 19
- Op. 525 – Symphony No. 20
- Op. 526 – Symphony No. 21 Niels Ebbesen
- Op. 527 – Symphony No. 22
- Op. 528 – Water Music II; for large ensemble
- Op. 529 – Hieroglyph No. 2, for two pianos
- Op. 530 – The Tempered Piano vol. 7
- Op. 531 – Duo concertante; for violin and double bass
- Op. 532 – The Tempered Piano vol. 8
- Op. 533 – Fantasy and Fugue on BACH, for two pianos
- Op. 534 – Forbundne Bassiner, for flute and piano
- Op. 535 – Bolero II; for piano and big band
- Op. 536
- Op. 537 – Ondine II; for piano
- Op. 538 – Poetic Sonatine, Intermezzo, for violin and cello
- Op. 539 – Duo, for violin and viola
- Op. 540 – Bass Sax Sonata
- Op. 541 – The Tempered Piano vol. 9
- Op. 542 – The Tempered Piano vol. 10
- Op. 543 – Poetic Sonatine II, Burla, for oboe solo
- Op. 544 – Hommage to Carl Nielsen, for two pianos
- Op. 545 – Panorama, for 11 instruments
- Op. 546 – The Tempered Piano vol. 11
- Op. 547 – Concerto for Dizzy; for trumpet and orchestra
- Op. 548 – Piece, for big band
- Op. 549 – Chôro Daniensis; for flute, clarinet, cello, guitar, piano, and percussion
- Op. 550 – Pollicino Quartet, for violin, viola, cello, and double-bass
- Op. 551 – Cabaret Voltaire, for guitar
- Op. 552 – Æbeltoft Fanfare, for trumpet
- Op. 553 – Trio No. 4, for violin, cello, and piano
- Op. 554 – The Tempered Piano vol. 12
- Op. 555 – Shells; for sax quartet
- Op. 556 – Symphony No. 23 Kaldet Piræus
- Op. 557 – The Tragedy of Lady Day, for mezzo-soprano and big band
- Op. 558 –
- Op. 559 – Little Suite, for piano
- Op. 560 – Tribute to the Mediterranean, piano (incomplete)
- Op. 561 – Fantasy I, Intermezzo, Fantasy II, for piano
- Op. 562 – Mazurka, for piano
- Op. 563 – Variations, for piano
- Op. 564 – Johannes the Seducer; for SATB chorus and small ensemble
- Op. 565 – Sainkhonism, for vocal solo and chamber ensemble
- Op. 566 – Quartet, for clarinet (B/A), violin, viola, and cello
- Op. 567 – IV Pezza (quasi una Sonata), for two pianos
- Op. 568 – Copenhagen Suite No. 1; for piano
- Op. 569 – Copenhagen Suite No. 2; for piano
- Op. 570 – Copenhagen Suite No. 3; for piano
- Op. 571 – Copenhagen Suite No. 4; for piano
- Op. 572 – Pyramid; for cello, flute, clarinet, percussion, guitar, and piano
- Op. 573 – Micro Trio, for tuba, violin, and percussion
- Op. 574 – September Quintet, for flute, oboe, violin, cello, and cembalo
- Op. 575 – Opus Pundik, for alto sax and piano
- Op. 576
- Op. 577 – Hus Forbi, for oboe, cello, and piano
- Op. 578 – Chamber Concerto, for clarinet solo and ensemble
- Op. 579 – Spirals, for clarinet, trumpet, and accordion
- Op. 580
- Op. 581
- Op. 582a – La Chien Rouge, for tuba and piano
- Op. 582b – La National Front, for oboe, clarinet, and bassoon
- Op. 583 – Jacques Chirac, for string quartet (associated with Op. 582)
- Op. 583 – Thirty Enzymes, for piano
- Op. 584 – Postulate and Paradox, for piano
- Op. 585 – Pneus, for piano
- Op. 586 – Infiltration, for piano
- Op. 587
- Op. 588
- Op. 589 – Prophilactic Prognosis, for piano
- Op. 590 – Kortspil, chamber opera (incomplete)
- Op. 591 – Can you Hear Gershwin?, chamber opera (incomplete)
- Op. 592
- Op. 593
- Op. 594
- Op. 595 – String Quartet No. 16
- Op. 596
- Op. 597 – Symphony No. 24
- Op. 598 – Concertino, for two pianos
- Op. 599 – Piano Sonata No. 23
- Op. 600 – Little Studio Suite, for piano
- Op. 601 – Chamber Concert, for solo piano, two bassoons, and percussion
- Op. 602
- Op. 603
- Op. 604
- Op. 605
- Op. 606
- Op. 607
- Op. 608 – Tsetse Fly, for flute, clarinet, violin, cello, guitar, piano, and percussion
- Op. 609
- Op. 610
- Op. 611 – Naïve Song, for mezzo-soprano and piano (incomplete)
- Op. 612
- Op. 613 – Vermichte Bemerkungen, for small ensemble
- Op. 614 – Musical Menu, for flute, oboe, violins, cello, and cembalo (incomplete)
- Op. 615
- Op. 616 – Motto Hafniensis, for piano
- Op. 617a – Prologue, for soprano, clarinet, and piano
- Op. 617b – Trenologue, for soprano, clarinet and piano
- Op. 618 – Hymn for the Extra! Newspaper, for voice and piano
- Op. 619
- Op. 620 – Ghost Stories (3), for alto and ensemble
- Op. 621 – Cellism, for 12 cellos
- Op. 622
- Op. 623
- Op. 624 – Piano Sonata No. 26
- Op. 625 – Piano Sonata No. 27
- Op. 626 – Piano Sonata No. 28
- Op. 627 – Piano Sonata No. 29 Taiwanese
- Op. 628
- Op. 629
- Op. 630 – First Glitters, for voice and ensemble
- Op. 631 – Pezzo, for piano
- Op. 632 – Mantziu Sonata, for piano
- Op. 632 – Quartet Brevo, for flute, clarinet, cello, and piano
- Op. 633 – The Tempered Piano vol. 13
- Op. 634 – Piano Sonata No. 30 Fetish
- Op. 635
- Op. 636 – Piano Sonata No. 31 Brøndsonata
- Op. 637
- Op. 638 – The Tempered Piano vol. 14
- Op. 639
- Op. 640
- Op. 641
- Op. 642
- Op. 643
- Op. 644
- Op. 645
- Op. 646
- Op. 647
- Op. 648
- Op. 649
- Op. 650 – Anti-Democratic Hymn to the Health Minister, for bari sax, trumpets, etc.
- Op. 651 – Anti-Attention Hymn to the Social Minister, for clarinet, harp, and guitar
- Op. 652 – Anti-Murder Hymn to the Labor Minister, for English Horn, tuba, cello
- Op. 653
- Op. 654
- Op. 655
- Op. 656
- Op. 657
- Op. 658
- Op. 659
- Op. 660
- Op. 661
- Op. 662 – As a Man Approaches Eighty, for piano
- Op. 663 – In Memory of Heitor Villa-Lobos, for piano (incomplete)
- Op. 664 – Strumenta Diabolica; for guitar

== Pieces without opus number ==
- Jazz Hieroglyph (?); for two pianos (1950)
- Fanfare; for 4 recorders and strings (1956)
- Reflections; for organ (1985)
- Beethoven en Face, for piano (1987)
- Postcard-Composition, for variable instrumentation (aleatoric) (1992)
- Contrapunctus XIV (org. unfinished by J.S. Bach), for organ (1993)
- 26 Fragments, for piano (based on Op. 436, Op. 559) (1996)
- Song from Joyce's Ulysses, for soprano and piano (1998)
- Tosatset, for cello solo (1998)
- For Six Hands, for 6H piano (1999)
- Pezzo, for saxophone, cornet, horn, tuba, violin, cello, cembalo, and perc (1999)
