= Giuseppe Persiani =

Italian composer (1799–1869)

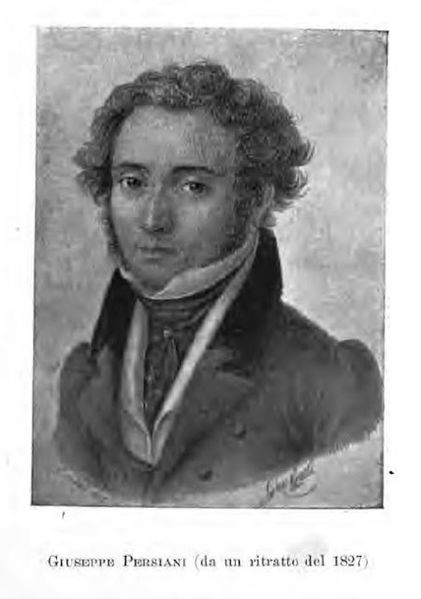
Giuseppe Persiani

Giuseppe Persiani (11 September 1799 – 13 August 1869) was an Italian opera composer.

Persiani was born in Recanati. He wrote his first of eleven operas in 1826 but, after his marriage to the soprano Fanny Tacchinardi Persiani, who was to become a significant singer in her time, he devoted much of his efforts to supporting her career. He worked in a variety of opera genres including opera buffa and wrote an oratorio named Abigaille and featuring the same character as in the popular Verdi opera, Nabucco. He was noted for his ability to effectively combine music and drama as well as florid decoration.

His best-known opera, Inês de Castro, from a libretto by Salvadore Cammarano (who also wrote the libretto for Donizetti's Lucia di Lammermoor the same year), was created in 1835 for the celebrated soprano Maria Malibran, who sang the role of the 14th-century Portuguese queen of the same name. The opera was first presented at La Scala in January 1837 but by that time, Malibran had died. After some revisions to tailor the role for his wife, the opera was presented in Paris in 1839. While it was given about 60 productions over a period of 16 years, after 1851 it was rarely, if ever, presented but was revived in the 20th Century in the Italian town of Jesi to celebrate the 200th anniversary of Persiani's birth.

Persiani was referred to favorably in Gustave Flaubert's Madame Bovary, alongside other notable singers of the time.

Persiani died in Paris, aged 69. His birthplace, the town of Recanati, has named an opera house after the composer, the Teatro Persiani.

== Works ==
Among the works of Persiani:

- Piglia il mondo come viene, opera buffa in two acts (1826, Florence). Libretto by: Angelo Anelli
- L'inimico generoso, opera semiseria in two acts (1826, Florence)
- Attila in Aquileia (Simeone Antonio Sografi), opera seria in two acts (1827, Parma). Libretto by: Simeone Antonio Sografi
- Danao re d'Argo, opera seria in two acts (1827, Florence). Libretto by: Felice Romani
- Gastone di Foix (ders.) (1827, Venice)
- Il solitario, opera seria in two acts (1829, Milan). Libretto by: Calisto Bassi.
- Eufemio di Messina ovvero La distruzione di Catania (Romani), opera seria in two acts (1829, Lucca); also known as I saraceni in Catania (1832, Padua) and Il rinnegato (1837, Naples)
- Costantino in Arles, opera seria in 3 acts (1829, Venice). Libretto by: P. Pola
- Inês de Castro, tragedia lirica in three acts (28 January 1835, Teatro San Carlo, Naples) Libretto by: Salvadore Cammarano
- Il fantasma (Romani), opera semiseria in three acts (1843, Paris)
- L'orfana savoiarda, opera seria in three acts (1846, Madrid)
