= Louis Lacombe =

French pianist and composer

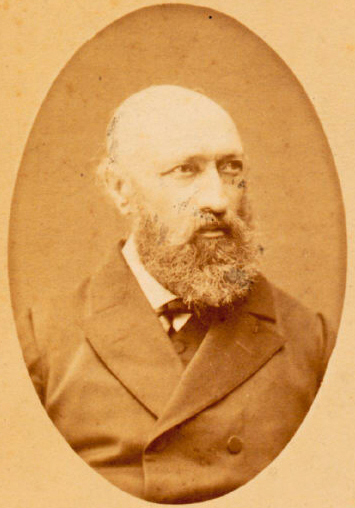
Louis Lacombe, photo by Étienne Carjat, ca. 1880, Bibliothèque nationale de France.

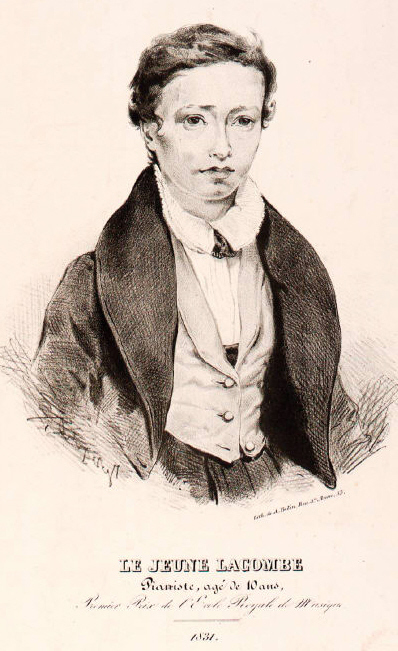
Louis Lacombe, (incorrectly stated as age 10 instead of age 12) in 1831, upon winning first prize for piano at the École Royale de Musique.

Pierre Louis Trouillon-Lacombe (26 November 1818 – 30 September 1884) was a French pianist and composer.

== Biography ==
Lacombe was born in Bourges (Cher), the brother of composer Felicita Casella. He showed unusual musical abilities at very young age and was soon hailed as a child prodigy. He studied piano at the Paris Conservatoire from 1829 to 1832 with Pierre Zimmerman and won first prize in piano performance at age 12 in 1831. He began touring Western Europe after leaving the Conservatoire, and in 1834 studied composition in Vienna with Carl Czerny as well as theory with Ignaz von Seyfried and Simon Sechter. At the end of the decade, he settled in Paris and married his first wife; his second wife, Andrea Lacombe (née Favel), whom he married in 1869, was a singer.

In Paris, Lacombe initially established himself as a virtuoso pianist, increasingly dedicating himself to composition and music criticism (his essays were partly reprinted in a posthumous collection, Philosophie et musique, 1896).

Lacombe's first published works include a piano quintet, a trio, and some piano pieces. He wrote a number of dramatic symphonies with soloist and choir, and his cantata, Sapho, was performed at the Paris Exposition Universelle (1878).

He wrote several operas, but only two were performed in his lifetime. La Madone was a modern composition with musical continuity through each act, elaborate orchestration, and only a small amount of spoken dialogue. However, the opening night response was described as lukewarm. Madame Boniface, a two-act comic piece, was performed in 1883, late in his life. Perhaps his finest work is Winkelried (1892), a four-act grand opera that premiered posthumously. Steven Huebner, writing in Grove, states "musically the score is worth more recognition than it has received. It betrays none of the influence of Gounod seen in so many French operas of the period. Though it is conservative in form, the orchestration and harmonic style are rich (...) Stirring homorhythmic choruses make Winkelried a fine vehicle for Swiss patriotic sentiment".

Lacombe died in Saint-Vaast-la-Hougue, a small town located on the English Channel, at age 65.

== Operas ==
- La Madone, opéra comique, 1 act (P. F. de Carmouche), f.p. 16 January 1861, Théâtre Lyrique, Paris.
- Winkelried, opéra, 4 acts (L. Bonnemère & Moreau-Sainti), ms. 1876–1881, f.p. 17 February 1892, Grand Théâtre, Geneva.
- Madame Boniface, opéra, 3 acts (E. Dupré & Clairville), f.p. autumn 1883, Théâtre Bouffes-Parisiens, Paris.
- Le Tonnelier de Nuremberg, opéra-comique, 2 acts Charles-Louis-Etienne Nuitter, after E.T.A. Hoffmann) in German as: Meister Martin und seine Gesellen, f.p. 7 March 1897, Koblenz.
- Le Corrigane, ou La Reine des eaux, opéra, 3 acts (Nuitter), in German as: Die Korrigane, f.p. 14 March 1901, Sondershausen.
- Le Festin de pierre, comic opera, 1 act (Clairville), in German as: Der Kreuzritter, f.p. 21 March 1902, Sondershausen.

== Bibliography ==
- Sadie, Stanley, ed. (1994) [1992]. The New Grove Dictionary of Opera. vol. 2, E-Lom, chpt: "Lacombe [Trouillon-Lacombe], Louis" by Steven Huebner. New York: MacMillan. ISBN 0-935859-92-6.
