= Felicita Casella =

Italian composer

Felicita Casella née Lacombe, also Félicie (c. 1820 – after 1865) was a French-born Italian singer and composer. She married Italian cellist and composer Cesare Casella and moved with him to Porto. Her opera Haydée was performed in Porto in 1849 and again in a revised and improved version at the Teatro Dona Maria in Lisbon in 1853, where Casella sang in the principal role. Her next opera Cristoforo Colombo was performed in 1865 at the Théâtre Impérial in Nice. Some of her works were issued by Ricordi.

== Life ==
Felicita Casella was born around 1820 as Félicie Lacombe. She was born at Bourges, and was the sister of French pianist and composer Louis Lacombe. She studied pianoforte and singing at the Paris Conservatoire. Before 1849, she married Italian cellist and composer Cesare Casella and moved with him to Porto.

Her opera Haydée was a retelling of Alexandre Dumas' Count of Monte Cristo, with libretto by Luiz Felipe Leite. The opera was performed in Porto in 1849 and again at the Teatro Dona Maria in Lisbon in 1853, where Casella sang in the principal role. Cohen reports that only the Lisbon version, which had been revised and improved, was considered successful. Her next opera Cristoforo Colombo was performed in 1865 at the Théâtre Impérial in Nice. She also composed romances, a funeral march on piano for Maria II, and an ave verum for voice and piano. Some of Casella's works were issued by Ricordi.

She died after 1865.

== Works ==
Casella composed two operas and other works including romances and pieces for voice and piano. Selected works include:

- Haydée, Portuguese opera (also Haidée, libretto by Luiz Felipe Leite after Alexandre Dumas’ Le Comte de Monte Cristo) 1849
- Cristoforo Colombo, opera (libretto by Felice Romani) 1865
- Marcia funebre (for Maria II) for piano
- Ave verum for voice and piano
