= Arrighetto =

- Opera by Carlo Coccia
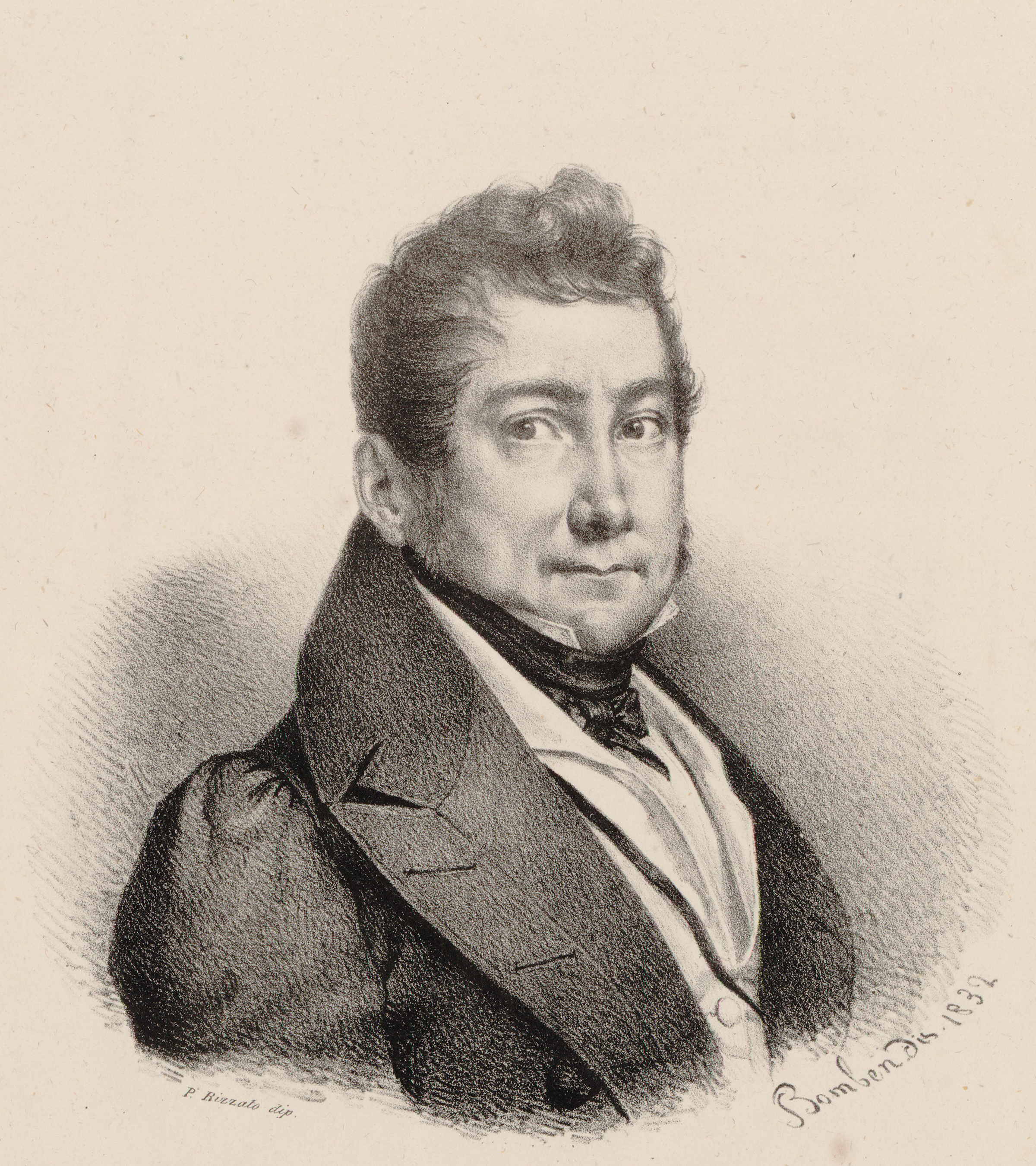
- The composer
- Librettist: Angelo Anelli
- Language: Italian
- Based on: Madonna Beritola from Decameron by Giovanni Boccaccio
- Premiere: January 9, 1813; Teatro San Moisè, Venice

Arrighetto is an opera in one act by Carlo Coccia. The Italian-language libretto was by Angelo Anelli, after Madonna Beritola, sixth tale of the second day of the Decameron by Giovanni Boccaccio. It premiered on 9 January 1813 at the Teatro San Moisè, Venice.

== Roles ==
Role	Voice type	Premiere cast, 9 January 1813 (Conductor: – )
Corrado, feoffee, father of Despina and remarriage husband of Donna Rosa	bass	Nicola de Grecis
Despina, his daughter	soprano	Teodolinda Pontiggia
Rosa, his wife	mezzo-soprano	Carolina Nagher
Giannotto, servant of Corrado	tenor	Tommaso Berti
Tebaldo, old gardener in the house of Corrado	bass	Luigi Rafanelli
Count Ludovico, betrothed of Despina	bass	Nicola Tacci
Pasquale, old servant of the Count	tenor	Gaetano dal Monte

== Synopsis ==
Place: Lunigiana, Italy
Time: 13th century

The plot is inspired by the tale of Madonna Beritola, told by Emilia in the second day of the Decameron by Giovanni Boccaccio, with significant variations.

In the tale, Giuffredi and Scacciato, the two sons of Arrighetto Capece, nobleman fallen into disfavour and arrested after the fall of the king of Sicily Manfredi, reach adventurously Genoa and find refuge with the Doria, a prominent family of the city. Many years later, one of them, Giuffredi, under the false name of Giannotto, arrives in Lunigiana and falls in love with the daughter of Corrado Malaspina, with whom the mother of Giuffredi and Scacciato, Beritola, had found refuge after her escape. Corrado discovers the relation between Giuffredi, become his servant, and his daughter and has them both imprisoned. But short time later Charles I of Naples, who had defeated and killed Manfredi, is in his turn defeated and Arrighetto is set free. When the news arrives in Lunigiana Giuffredi exults, such that his true identity is discovered. Corrado, friend of Arrighetto, releases Giuffredi and agrees to the marriage with his daughter. Arrighetto's family can be reunited.

In Coccia's opera, the action takes place in the palace of Corrado, with some modifications to the roles. It is supposed that Arrighetto handed his sons over to the servant Pasquale, who brought them to the Doria in Genoa. Many years later Arrighetto, Pasquale and Arrighetto's sons meet again in the house of Corrado, but too much time has passed and they can not recognize each other.

Arrighetto, in order not to be discovered by his enemies, conceals himself behind the name of Tebaldo, gardener of Corrado. Corrado has decided that his daughter Despina will marry the rich Count Ludovico. Ludovico, actually the younger son of Arrighetto, adopted by the Doria, arrives accompanied by Pasquale, the only one that knows his true identity. But Despina is in love with Giannotto, servant of Corrado, the elder son of Arrighetto, fled from Genoa some years before. Pasquale realizes that Tebaldo is actually Arrighetto, but Arrighetto cannot disclose his true identity because he is in fear of his life. Pasquale however reveals to Arrighetto that Ludovico is his son.

Despina refuses to marry Ludovico, and this causes the disdain of Rosa, her stepmother. But Ludovico, keeping watch on Giannotto, realizes that he is his missing brother and resolves on giving up his project of marrying Despina. As in Boccaccio's tale, the plot reaches its epilogue when the news of the defeat of Charles I arrives: Arrighetto can now reveal his identity and rejoice with his sons, and Giannotto will marry Despina.

== Recordings ==
2005: Fabrizio Dorsi, Orchestra Sinfonica Carlo Coccia, DVD: Bongiovanni AB 20004. Recorded at Teatro coccia, Novara, November 2005

Corrado: Gezim Mishketa
Despina: Elisaveta Martyrosian
Rosa: Enrica Fabri
Giannotto: Filippo Adami

Tebaldo: Maurizio Lo Piccolo
Count Ludovico: Omar Montanari
Pasquale: Davide Rocca
