= René-Charles Guilbert de Pixérécourt =

French theatre director and playwright

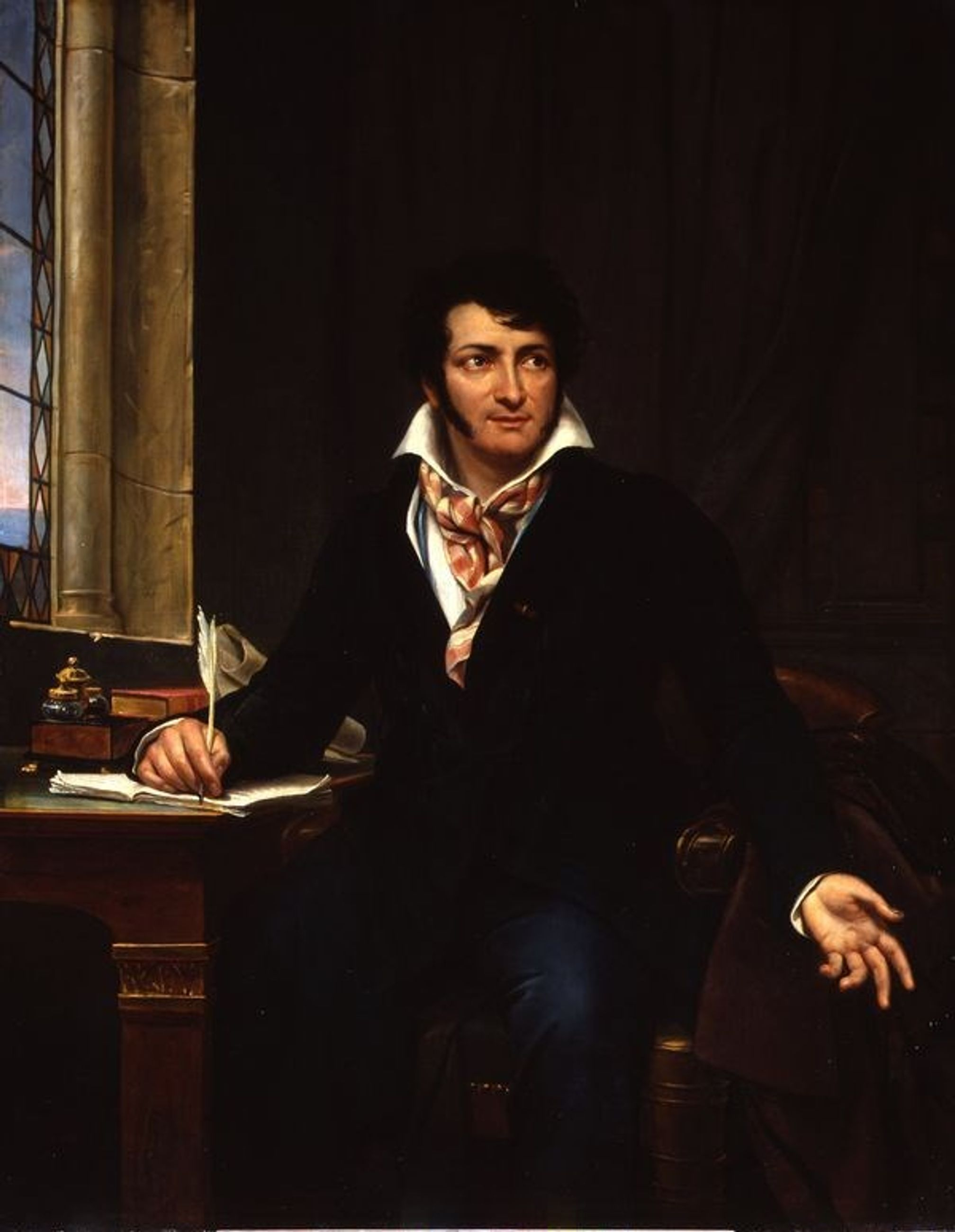
Portrait of Guilbert de Pixerécourt, 1822, by Sophie Chéradame

René-Charles Guilbert de Pixerécourt (22 January 1773 – 27 July 1844) was a French theatre director and playwright, active at the Théâtre de la Gaîté and best known for his modern melodramas such as The Dog of Montarges, the performance of which at Weimar roused the indignation of Goethe.

== Life ==
He was born at Nancy into a Lorraine family of rural nobles. His parents, after the sale of the Pixerécourt estate, bought another in the Vosges, Saint-Vallier, in the hope of recovering their feudal and manorial rights, and possibly in time acquiring a marquisate. The château was in poor condition, the kind which "could make you a marquis and a mendicant in the same instant" in the words of Jules Janin. The family's hopes were ruined by the Revolution. At the age of twenty, in 1793, Pixerécourt abandoned his studies of law and left Nancy "on the day of the King's death" to meet his father at Koblenz and enter the Breton regiment as an officer in the army of Condé. At the end of the year he returned to France to make his fortune, entering via Nancy and arriving in Paris on 27 February 1794 at the height of the Reign of Terror. After the denunciations of the Committee of Public Safety, Pixerécourt owed his life to the protection of Lazare Carnot who, for nearly two years, employed him as a secretary in the Ministry of War. He then obtained two posts, one in the Administration of Domains and another in that of Registrations, both of which he was to retain for thirty years and which allowed him, particularly at the beginning, the pursuit of a career in the theatre. He would eventually become director of the Théâtre royal de l’Opéra-Comique (from 1824 to 1827) and of the Théâtre de l'Ambigu-Comique.

The general mistrust of ex-émigrés prompted him to take the pseudonym of "Charles" for his first works. He had taken only one book with him into exile: the Nouvelles of Jean-Pierre Claris de Florian, which gave him the subject of his first two plays: Sélico ou les Nègres généreux ("Sélico, or The Magnanimous Slaves"), purchased by the Théâtre-Français, and Claudine ou l’Anglais vertueux ("Claudine, or the Virtuous Englishman"), taken up by Salle Favart. His first great success came in 1800 with Cœlina ou l’Enfant du mystère ("Coelina, or The Child of Mystery"). The following year, in April, Le Pèlerin blanc ou les Enfants du hameau ("The White Pilgrim, or the Children of the Village") ran for 386 performances at L’Ambigu. This was nearly beaten by L'Homme à trois visages ("The Man With Three Faces") which ran for 378 nights at the same theatre. In September 1802, La Femme à deux maris ("The Wife With Two Husbands") continued his good fortune. In 1803, Tékéli, performed by Tantin and Mme Bourgeois, broke his previous record with a run of 430 nights. In 1805, La Forteresse du Danube and Robinson Crusoé ran for a whole year at the Porte-Saint-Martin.

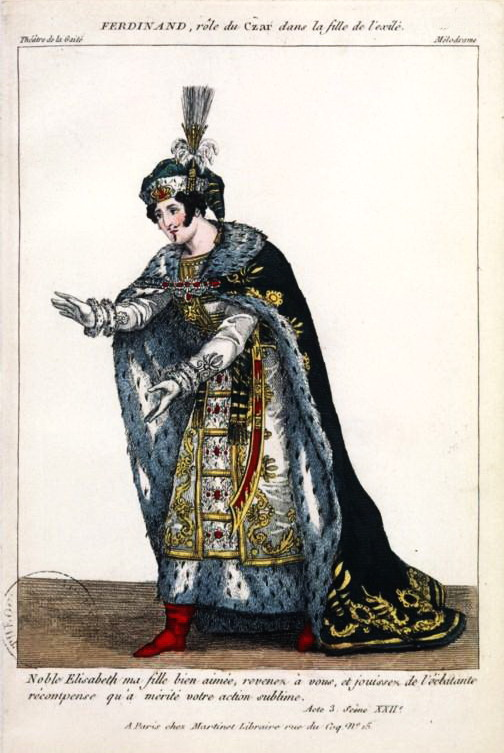
Costume sketch for the actor Ferdinand in the rôle of the Tsar in La Fille de l'exilé, given at the Théâtre de la Gaîté, 13 March 1819

In 1809, he began writing for the Théâtre de la Gaîté, his first play there being La Citerne; on 30 October 1810, his first hit was Les Ruines de Babylone. From then until 1814, his success continued, with a major triumph in the June of that year with Le Chien de Montargis (400 performances). In 1815, after the total failure of Christophe Colomb, he regained success with Le Monastère abandonné ou la Malédiction paternelle ("The Abandoned Monastery, or the Paternal Curse") which lasted 267 performances. And in 1818, still at La Gaîté, Le Belvédère ou la Vallée de l’Etna ("The Belvedere, or the Valley of Etna") owed its success not just to the playwright but also to the magnificent art direction of Louis Daguerre who contributed the volcanic backdrop. In 1819, he returned to L’Ambigu with La Fille de l’Exilé ou Huit mois en deux heures ("The Exile's Daughter, or Eight Months and Two Hours").

From 1820, his successes continued, albeit with around a hundred performances for each play: Le Drapeau blanc ("The White Flag", 1821), Ali Baba ou les Quarante voleurs ("Ali Baba, or the Forty Thieves", 1822), Le Moulin des Étangs ("The Mill", 1826), and La Tête de mort ou les Ruines de Pompéi ("The Death's-Head, or the Ruins of Pompeii", 1827). Some plays were written in collaboration, like La Muette de la forêt ("The Mute Girl of the Forest", 1828). His last play before retiring as director of the Opéra-Comique in 1827 would be Latude ou Trente-cinq ans de captivité ("Latude, or 35 Years of Captivity"), written with his young disciple Auguste Anicet-Bourgeois. For nearly forty years, he maintained his energetic activities as author, theatre director and government inspector. His immense success as a dramatic author led to him being dubbed the Corneille des Boulevards. Paul Lacroix recalled that Charles Nodier placed him in the first rank of authors of his generation. His reputation was almost as high in Russia, Germany, and England. His wealth allowed him to add many rare books to his library, the great passion of his life. A distich inscribed above the door read: Tel est le triste sort de tout livre prêté: Souvent il est perdu, toujours il est gâté. ("Such is the sad fate of every lent book: Often it is lost, always it is marred.") And inside each of his books, a slip of paper read: Un livre est un ami qui ne change jamais. ("A book is a friend who never changes.")

On 21 February 1835, the Théâtre de la Gaîté, on the Boulevard du Temple, was completely destroyed by fire. His last play there was Bijou ou l’Enfant de Paris ("Bijou, or the Child of Paris"): apparently firework effects were being tested during a dress rehearsal. The Théâtre de la Gaîté would however be reconstructed very rapidly, with metal frames, to reopen on 19 November, the reconstruction being overseen by Bernard Léon who had only just bought the venue for 500 000 francs. (Nevertheless it would merge with L’Ambigu only ten years later.) Pixerécourt won the day in court and avoided ruin. Although he was not the theatre's owner, he had lost an immense quantity of properties and scenery (estimated as worth 300,000 francs) which contributed greatly to the success of his dramatic presentations. The stress of the accident greatly damaged his health. Already a victim of kidneystones and gout, he had his first attack of apoplexy, and his eyesight began to fail.

Around 1838, he left his Parisian "headquarters" at Fontenay-sous-Bois (a house which had belonged to his friend, the composer Nicolas Dalayrac, whose biography he had written) and retired to his birthplace, Nancy, possibly living in a house southeast of the town at Haussonville, le seul bien que m’ait laissé ma famille ("the only property my family has left me"), where, greatly weakened, he set about editing his complete works. His Théâtre choisi was published at Nancy in four volumes from 1841 to 1843. He also published the catalogue of his library at Saint-Nicolas-de-Port. He had possessed more than 4000 volumes, purchased over many years for 100,000 francs, and the value of which had greatly increased when they were sold on 22 January 1839 at the Libraire Crozet, at Paris.

One of his plays, La cisterne, served as the basis for Gaetano Donizetti's opera Chiara e Serafina.

== Bibliography ==
- W. G. Hartog, Guilbert de Pixerécourt : sa vie, son mélodrame, sa technique et son influence, Paris, H. Champion, 1913.
- André Virely, René-Charles Guilbert de Pixerécourt (1773-1844), Paris, Édouard Rahir, 1909.
