= Feliciano Strepponi =

Italian composer

Feliciano Cristoforo Bartolomeo Strepponi (26 October 1793 – 13 January 1832) was an Italian composer and conductor. He was born in Lodi and died in Trieste at the age of 38. Amongst his compositions were seven operas which had a modest success in their day. The last one, L'Ullà di Bassora, premiered at La Scala in 1831. He was the father and first teacher of the opera singer Giuseppina Strepponi who later became the second wife of Giuseppe Verdi.

== Life ==
Strepponi was born in the northern Italian city of Lodi to Maria (née Destefani) and Giuseppe Strepponi. Although some older sources give his birth year as 1797, research published in 2006 by Lodi historian Maria Moretti gives his birth date as 26 October 1793. He was baptised the following day with the name Feliciano Cristoforo Bartolomeo. The Strepponi family were intellectuals and liberal-minded supporters of Napoleon Bonaparte. They also had a strong interest in music with several members of the family having attended the Milan Conservatory. Strepponi's older brother Francesco became the maestro di cappella at the Church of the Beata Vergine Incoronata in Lodi. His sister Giovanna was a schoolmistress in the city.

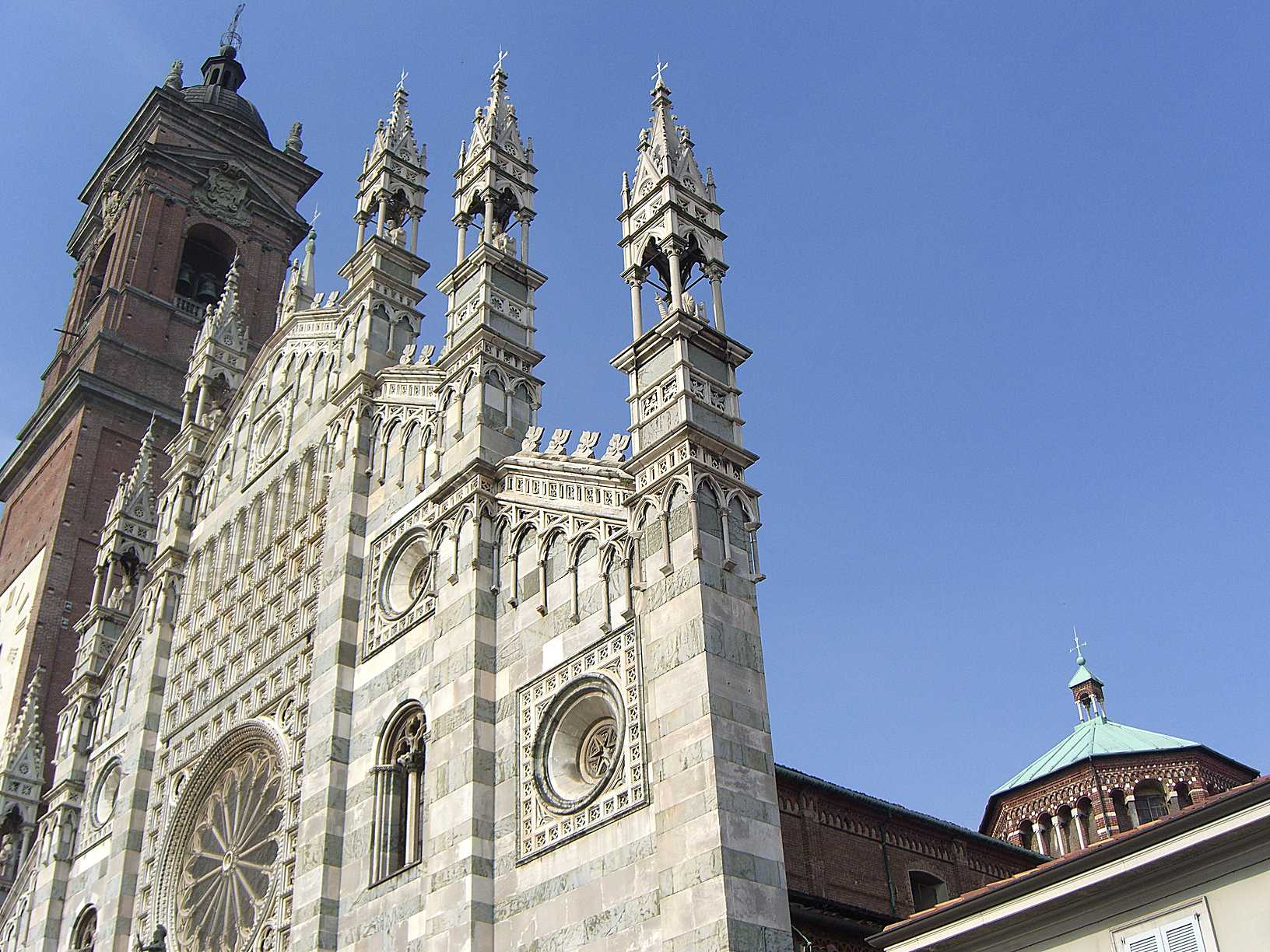
Monza Cathedral where Strepponi served as maestro di cappella from 1820 to 1828

Strepponi showed a precocious talent for music. In 1812 (aged 19), he conducted the Te Deum at the Lodi Cathedral celebrating the return of Napoleon Bonaparte. That year he met Rosa Cornalba (1793–1870), a native of Lodi who came from a family of modest shopkeepers and artisans distantly related to the noble Barberini family. They married on 3 November 1814 to an organ accompaniment composed by Strepponi's brother Francesco. Giuseppina, the first of their six children (four of whom survived to adulthood), was born on 9 September 1815. In 1820 Strepponi received his diploma from the Milan Conservatory winning a special prize in composition. His first opera, Amore e fedeltà alla prova premiered at the theatre in Lodi that same year.

Upon completion of his music studies in Milan, Strepponi was appointed maestro di cappella at Monza Cathedral on the recommendation of his former teacher Vincenzo Federici. For the next few years he travelled between Lodi, Monza, Milan, and Turin, while his wife and children remained in Lodi. Three more of his operas were produced, two of which had librettos by Felice Romani with whom he would form a close friendship. Both were members of the Carbonari, a secret revolutionary society founded in the early 19th-century which played an active role in opposing Austrian rule of northern Italy. In 1828, he was dismissed from his post at Monza Catherdral, partly because of his frequent absences and partly because of his suspected revolutionary tendencies. However, he had an offer from the Teatro Grande in Trieste to serve as the assistant conductor to Giuseppe Farinelli and to compose two new operas.

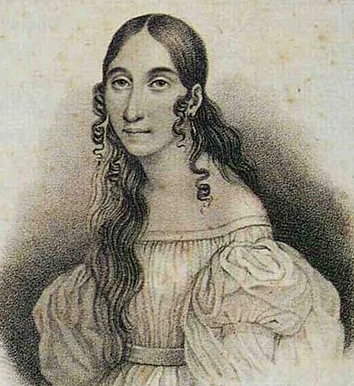
Giuseppina Strepponi ca. 1840. She is said to have inherited her prominent nose and large dark eyes from her father.

With his new appointment, the entire Strepponi family moved to Trieste where they had an apartment facing the Piazza Piccola. Considered an excellent opera conductor, Strepponi soon attracted prominent singers to the Teatro Grande, including Giuditta Grisi and Caroline Ungher. The premiere of his opera Gli Illinesi there in 1829 was a breakthrough for him as a composer and would ultimately lead to a commission from La Scala. In the meantime, his fifteen-year-old daughter Giuseppina whom he trained in both piano and singing was showing considerable promise as a musician. In November 1830, he brought her to the Milan Conservatory where she was accepted as a pupil despite being slightly over the age limit for entry. His opera L' Ullà di Bassora premiered at La Scala in September of the following year to some success and had a further fifteen performances there. However, with a family to support and Giuseppina's fees at the conservatory to be paid, Strepponi had embarked on a brief but frenetic career as an impresario, leaving his post in Trieste, where his wife and three other children remained while he travelled throughout Italy.

The final year of Strepponi's life was marked by increasing ill-health and the loss of all his money through disastrous investments. After days in a delirium, he died of encephalitis in Trieste on 13 January 1832 at the age of 38. His body was taken to Lodi where his funeral took place at the Chiesa di Santa Maria Maddalena. His brother Francesco conducted the Requiem Mass which Strepponi had composed during his time in Monza. Giuseppina's fees at the conservatory continued to be paid through a special grant, but the family was in dire straits after her father's death. Her mother was forced to sell many of their belongings, and her younger sister Maria had to be taken in by Lodi's orphanage. Giuseppina graduated from the Milan conservatory two years later, became an opera singer of considerable renown, and later married the composer Giuseppe Verdi. On the table beside her deathbed in 1897 stood the gold reliquary which had been given to her father by the Emperor of Austria.

== Works ==
Strepponi composed numerous pieces of sacred music during his time at Monza Cathedral as well as a secular cantata, Artemisia al mausoleo (published in Milan by Luigi Bertuzzi in 1823). However, he was best known for his operas. Arias from several of them were also published separately by Casa Ricordi and the Parisian music publisher Bernard Latte.

Operas

- Amore e fedeltà alla prova (farsa giocosa in 1 act), libretto by Giuseppe Foppa, Teatro Sociale, Lodi, Carnival season 1820
- L'ammogliato nubile (dramma giocoso in 2 acts), libretto by Vittorio Pezzi, Teatro d'Angennes, Turin, Spring 1822
- Chi fa così fa bene (melodramma giocoso in 2 acts), libretto by Felice Romani, Teatro Re, Milan, 6 February 1823
- Francesca da Rimini (dramma per musica in 3 acts), libretto by Felice Romani, Teatro Eretenio, Vicenza, 23 July 1823
- Gli Illinesi (melodramma serio in 2 acts), libretto by Felice Romani, Teatro Grande, Trieste, 20 November 1829
- Amore e mistero (melodramma comico in 3 acts), libretto by Gaetano Rossi, Teatro Carignano, Turin, Autumn 1830
- L' Ullà di Bassora (melodramma comico in 2 acts), libretto by Felice Romani, La Scala, Milan, 20 September 1831
