= Niels Viggo Bentzon =

Danish composer and pianist

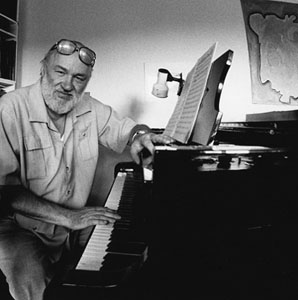
Niels Viggo Bentzon in January 1986, as photographed by Danish photojournalist Erling Mandelmann.

Niels Viggo Bentzon (24 August 1919 – 25 April 2000) was a Danish composer and pianist.

== Biography ==
Bentzon was born and died in Copenhagen. He was the son of Viggo Bentzon (1861-1937), Rector of Copenhagen University, and Karen Hartmann (1882-1977), concert pianist. Through his mother, Bentzon was descended from the Danish composer Johann Hartmann and was the great-grandson of the Danish composer J.P.E. Hartmann. From 1938 to 1942, he studied at the Royal Danish Academy of Music in Copenhagen under Knud Jeppesen and Christian Christiansen. He then taught at The Royal Academy of Music in Aarhus (1945–50) and at The Royal Danish Academy (1950–88).

As a pianist, he left many recordings of works by Beethoven, Scriabin, Busoni, Schoenberg, Petrassi and others, as well as himself. He is also well known for the three-note jingle D/Eb/Bb (pronounced D/S/B in Danish) on the acronym of DSB, the Danish Railroad Company "Danske Statsbaner", his most performed piece as it is played on arrival of any train in Danish rail stations.

Niels became well-known in Denmark as a composer, as he has over 650 works to his credit, often times experimenting with avant-garde techniques.

== Works ==
Niels Viggo Bentzon's compositions extend to 664 opus numbers, including 24 symphonies, operas, ballets, concertos for almost all instruments (of which 7 for the piano), and 16 string quartets. Arguably the most significant part of his œuvre is for the piano to which a third of his output is dedicated, and consisting of 31 numbered sonatas (and many unnumbered), partitas, suites, toccatas and others. Of particular importance are the 13 separate sets of 24 preludes and fugues, collectively known as "The Tempered Piano", which represents a notable 20th-century example of music written in all 24 major and minor keys.

Niels Viggo Bentzon's style can mostly be described as "neoclassical" and is influenced by composers such as Paul Hindemith, Johannes Brahms, Bela Bartok and Carl Nielsen. Later compositions draw also inspiration from Benjamin Britten, Alban Berg or Igor Stravinsky.

His works can often be volcanic and fiery, then alternating with more poetic parts, and have some stylistic affinity with Prokofievs piano sonatas. In the fifties Bentzon has used the metamorphosis technique and he has later also written dodecaphonic works but, whatever the technique used, his style is easily recognizable and characterized by great expressivity, strong contrasts and striking themes. The quality of his best works is high and they have become classics in the Danish repertoire. Bentzon had a leading role in the Scandinavian music of the second half of the 20th century. Together with Herman David Koppel and Vagn Holmboe, he was one of the three main Danish composers of the time.

As a pianist, Niels Viggo Bentzon was the first performer to record Arnold Schoenberg's Suite for Piano, Op. 25. Bentzon also wrote novels, poetry as well as books on Beethoven, Hindemith or dodecaphonic music, and liked to draw and paint in his spare time.

== Music ==
See List of compositions by Niels Viggo Bentzon

== Bibliography ==
- Bertel Krarup, Niels Viggo Bentzon, Danske Komponister, Multivers, 2020, 144 pages
- Toke Lund Christiansen, Bentzon, komponist, pianist, provokatør, Aarhus Universitetsforlag, 2019, 326 pages
- Niels Viggo Bentzon, Beethoven - en skitse af et geni, København, 1970
- Niels Viggo Bentzon, Focus paa en musikalsk fløderandssituation, København, 1999
- Niels Viggo Bentzon, Paul Hindemith, København 1997
- Niels Viggo Bentzon, Tolvtoneteknik, København, 1953
- Klaus Møllerhøj, Niels Viggo Bentzon kompositioner, København 1980
