= Caterina di Guisa =

1833 opera by Carlo Coccia

- Opera by Carlo Coccia
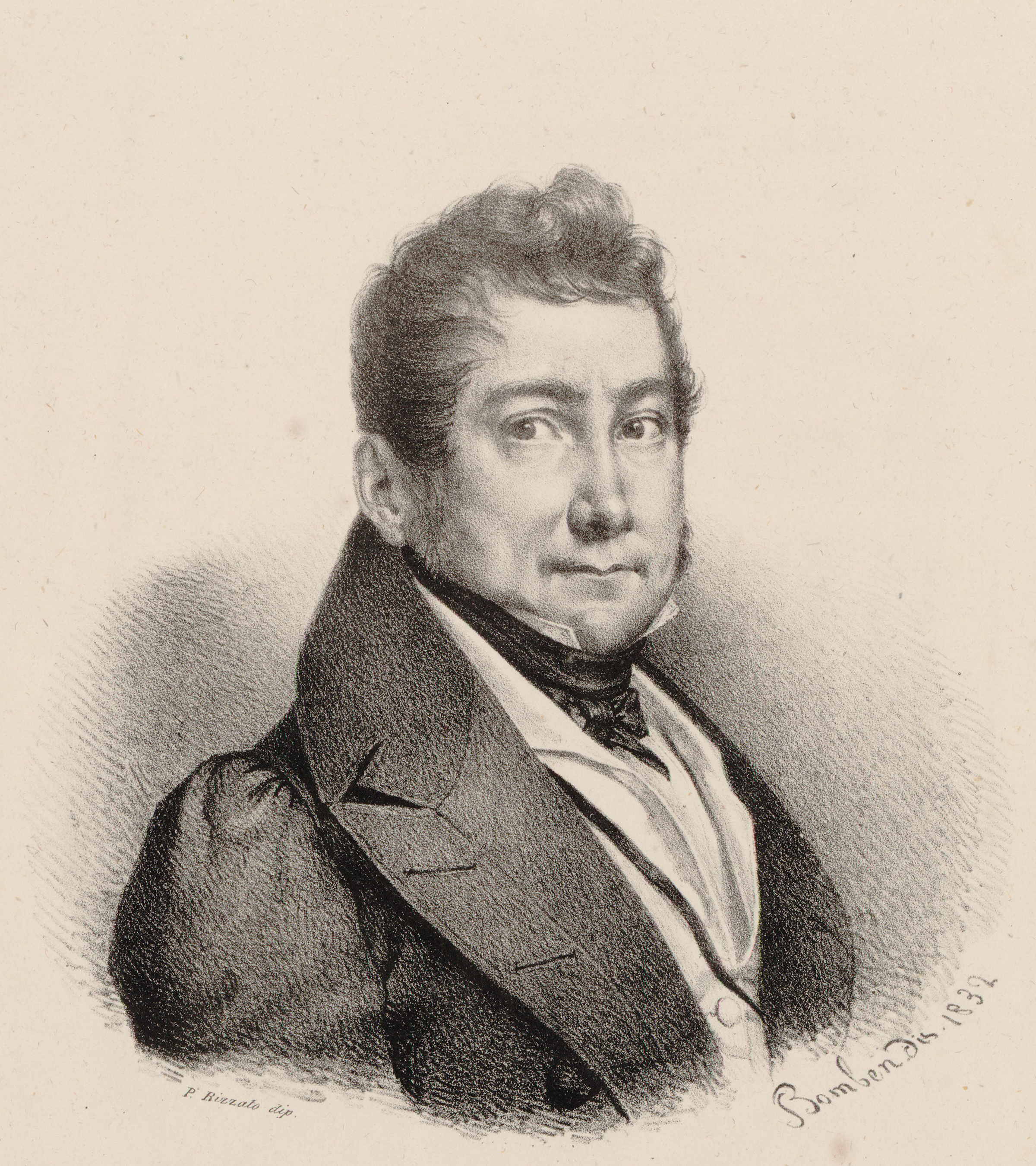
- The composer
- Librettist: Felice Romani
- Language: Italian
- Based on: Henry III and His Courts by Alexandre Dumas
- Premiere: February 14, 1833; Teatro alla Scala, Milan

Caterina di Guisa is an opera in two acts by Carlo Coccia to a libretto by Felice Romani based on the 1829 play Henry III and His Court by Alexandre Dumas. Caterina di Guisa premiered on 14 February 1833 at the Teatro alla Scala in Milan with triumphal success. A revised version, probably prepared to exploit at its best the different cast, was presented on 15 June 1836 at the Teatro Carignano in Turin. This opera is characterized by an "intensely dramatic score, rich in power and originality" and by a "heartrending finale".

In modern times, Caterina di Guisa was revived at the Teatro Gabriello Chiabrera in Savona on 30 October 1990. This performance was recorded and published on CD.

== Roles ==
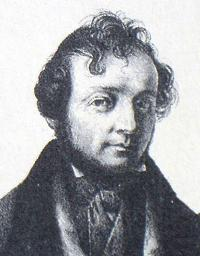
Domenico Reina, the first Enrico

Roles, voice types, premiere casts
Role	Voice type	Premiere cast, 14 February 1833	Premiere cast, 1836 revision, 15 June 1836
Henri I, Duke of Guise, leader of the Catholic League (Italian: Enrico)	tenor (bass in 1836 revision)	Domenico Reina	Pio Botticelli
Catherine of Cleves, his wife Caterina	soprano	Adelaide Tosi	Henriette Méric-Lalande
Arthur of Cleves, cousin and equerry of the Duchess (Arturo)	contralto (mezzo-soprano in 1836 revision)	Isabella Fabbrica	Carlotta Griffini
Count of San Megrino, the favourite of the King of France	tenor	Francesco Pedrazzi	Domenico Donzelli
Knight and Ladies, Members of the League, Friends of San Megrino, Ladies-in-waiting of the Duchess, Courtiers, Officiers, Soldiers

== Synopsis ==
Time: 1578
Place: Paris
During the reign of Henry III of France, Henry I, Duke of Guise, is the leader of the Catholic League, enemy of the Huguenots and hostile to the king.

=== Act 1 ===
A party is going on in a gallery of the Louvre (chorus: "Lo vedeste? – Il Dio parea" / "Did you see him? – He acted as a God"). San Megrino and some members of the League are present. San Megrino courts the Duchess Caterina: he has fallen in love with her, although she is the wife of his enemy, the Duke of Guise. Caterina is frightened but returns the attentions of San Megrino (duet: "Non fuggirmi: in me destasti" / "Do not shun me: you aroused in me"). When they leave, Caterina loses a handkerchief; the Duke picks it up, but he thinks that it was lost by San Megrino going away and suspects that there can be a relation between him and the Duchess (aria: "Grave, tremendo arcano" / "Grave, terrible secret"). Later the Duke encounters San Megrino and they accuse each other of plotting against the King (duet: "Pera chi vuol turbarla" / "May die who wants to break the peace"). San Megrino challenges his rival to a duel, but the Duke, considering himself of a higher rank, does not accept.

The next scene is in the palace of the Duke. Arturo, cousin and equerry of the Duchess, has also fallen in love with her, but knows that his love is without hope (aria and cavatina: "Con la luce, con la vita / Un sol momento" / "With light, with life / Only one moment"). Caterina appears, worried for losing her handkerchief, then Arturo reads some love verses of the French poet Pierre de Ronsard ("Deh! non pensar che spegnere" / "Do not believe that I can extinguish"). Later the Duke forces Caterina to admit to have been courted by San Megrino (duet: "E infierir così potete / Ah! lo veggo, un'imprudenza" / "And you can keep going at me / Ah! I see, an imprudence"). Caterina is forced by the Duke to write a letter to San Megrino to invite him in her rooms and set a trap. Caterina, under surveillance of her husband, asks Arturo to deliver the message. Arturo realizes that it is an invitation for San Megrino and would like not to leave her (duettino: "Io lasciarti? Sì afflitta" / "That I leave you / So afflicted"). Caterina thinks disconsolate to her destiny, while the Duke anticipates his revenge (finale 1: "Veggo, ah! veggo il destin" / "I see, ah! I see the destiny").

=== Act 2 ===
The chorus acclaims San Megrino, winner of a joust (march and chorus introduction: "Dunque è ver?" / "Is it true?"). Arturo delivers the letter of Caterina and San Megrino, happy, tells him to go back to the Duchess and to reassure her. (aria: "Torna a lei" / "Go to her").

Arturo returns to the palace of the Duke. The Duke has ordered to allow anyone to enter the palace, such that the trap for San Megrino can work. Arturo, realizing that the letter is a trap set by the Duke, tries vainly to dissuade him appealing to his honor (duet: "Guisa, dirà la terra" / "Guisa, the world will say") but the wish for revenge is stronger ("Da un destin sospinto io sono" / "I am driven by a destiny").

Caterina, segregated in her apartments, is sad because she cannot do anything to inform San Megrino of the danger (aria: "Ah, fidar potessi almeno" / "Ah, could I at least entrust"). A short time later, San Megrino enters in the room without encountering any obstacle. Caterina is frightened and tries to convince him to flee, such that San Megrino doubts about her love. But then he declares his love to Caterina ("Ah questa volta io sento / Dolce la morte rendimi" / "Ah, this time I feel / Make the death sweet to me"). Then San Megrino, with the help of Arturo that provides him with a rope, flees from the window, just in time to avoid the Duke, who enters knocking down the door ("Ov'è desso?" / "Where is he?"). But Arturo and San Megrino have been discovered and now they are fighting against the guards of the Duke. Caterina, terrified, begs her husband to have mercy on them (aria: "Lascia in prima" / "Let at least"). But both Arturo and San Megrino are killed by the soldiers of the Duke. The Duke throws Caterina the handkerchief that aroused his suspects and Caterina curses him (finale: "Ah! m'uccidi" / "You are killing me").

== Recordings ==
Year	Cast: Enrico, Caterina, Arturo, San Megrino	Conductor, opera house and orchestra	Label
1990	Stefano Antonucci, Carmela Apollonio, Nicoletta Ciliento, Mario Leonardi	Massimo de Bernart, Orchestra Filarmonica Italiana, Coro "Francesco Cilea" di Reggio Calabria, Banda "Antonio" Forzano di Savona (Recording of a live performance at the Teatro Chiabrera, Savona, on 30 October and 3 November, 1990)	CD: Bongiovanni; Cat: GB 2117/18-2
