= Chiara e Serafina =

Opera by Gaetano Donizetti

- Opera semiseria by Gaetano Donizetti
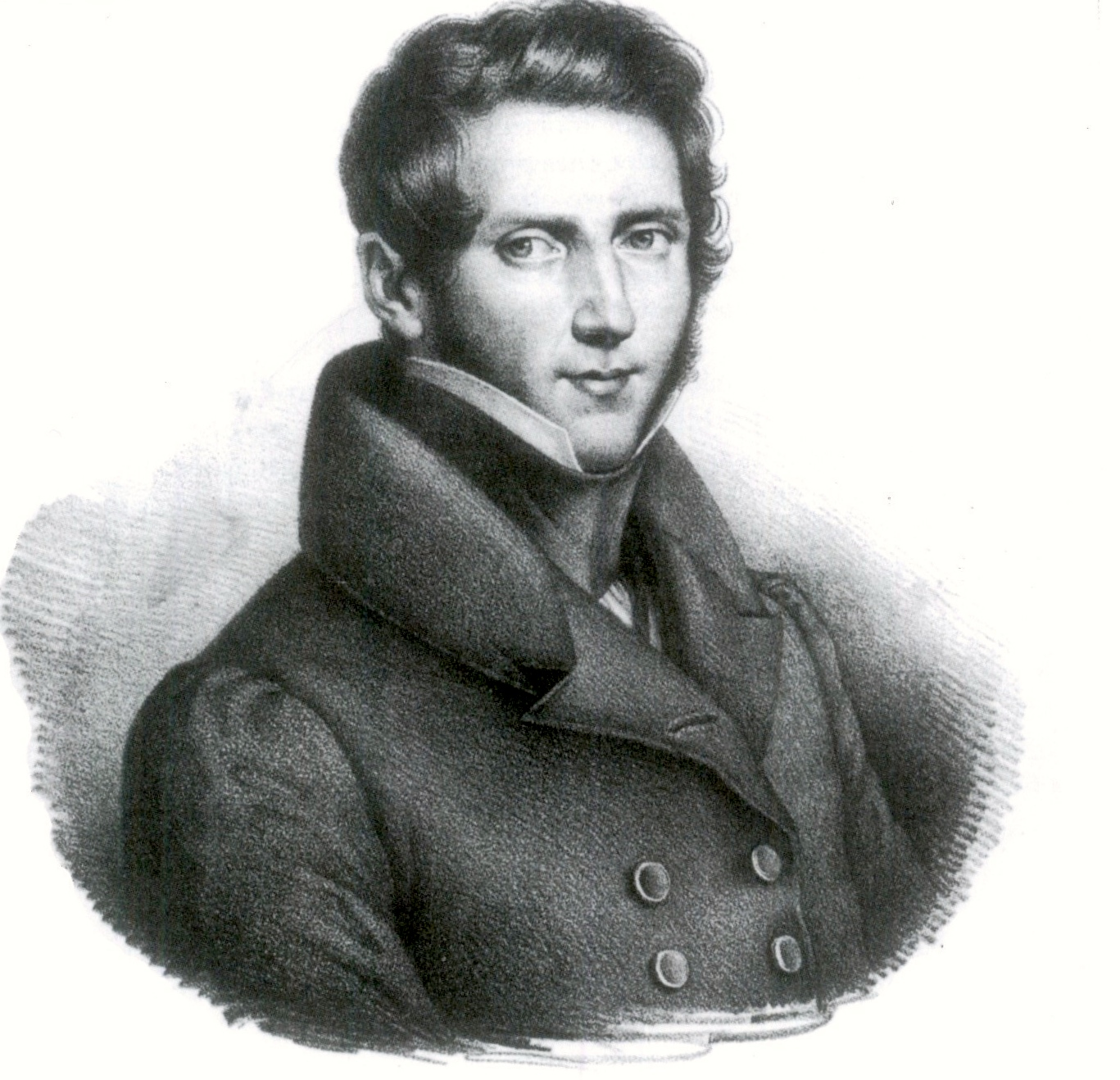
- Donizetti as a young man
- Librettist: Felice Romani
- Language: Italian
- Based on: La cisterne by René Charles Guilbert de Pixérécourt
- Premiere: 26 October 1822; La Scala, Milan

Chiara e Serafina, o I pirati (Chiara and Serafina, or The Pirates) is an opera semiseria in two acts by Gaetano Donizetti to a libretto by Felice Romani, based on the melodrama La cisterne by René Charles Guilbert de Pixérécourt. Donizetti's first opera for La Scala, it was premiered on October 26, 1822, but was not a success. Donizetti was not given the opportunity to compose again for La Scala until writing Ugo, conte di Parigi nearly a decade later.

== Composition ==
The commission for Chiara e Serafina came about not long after the successful premiere of the farsa La lettera anonima in Naples. Upon requesting the new work, La Scala paired Donizetti with Felice Romani, the foremost librettist then working in Italy, but an individual who was notorious for failing to deliver his work on time. Such proved to be the case once again; he promised a libretto in seven weeks, but three weeks before the premiere had failed to deliver any more than a first act. Consequently, Donizetti was forced to compose the opera in under two weeks. It was premiered after two more weeks spent in rehearsal, but the audience was unimpressed. Twelve performances were scheduled, but after they were finished the opera appears to have disappeared without a trace. No further performances are known. A likely reason for the opera's lack of popularity, besides the haste in which it was composed, was a major treason trial in Milan; this kept the public from visiting theaters, which were being watched by police.

For his part, Donizetti seems to have accepted the inevitability of a failure. He wrote to his old teacher, Simone Mayr: "I suggest that you bring a Requiem to the performance, for I shall be slaughtered, and thus the funeral rites can be taken care of."

== Roles ==
Role	Voice type	Interpreter at premiere (26 October 1822)
Chiara	soprano	Isabella Fabbrica
Serafina	mezzo-soprano	Rosa Morandi
Don Ramiro, son of the podestà of Minorca, in love with to Serafina	tenor	Savino Monelli
Picaro, former servant of Don Fernando, now a pirate	baritone or basso cantante	Antonio Tamburini
Lisetta, daughter of Sancio and Agnese	contralto or soprano	Maria Gioja-Tamburini
Agnese, custodian of the castle of Belmonte	mezzo-soprano	Carolina Sivelli
Don Meschino, wealthy villager of Belmont, foolish, in love with Lisetta	spoken role	Nicola de Grecis
Don Fernando, tutor of Serafina, false friend of Don Alvaro, rich lord of Minorca	tenor	Carlo Poggiali (perhaps Poggioli?)
Don Alvaro, ship's captain, enslaved in Algeria, father of Chiara and Serafina	spoken role or bass	Carlo Pizzochero
Gennaro, pirate captain	spoken role	Carlo Poggiali
Spalatro, pirate captain	spoken role	Carlo Dona
Chorus of peasants, pirates and guards

== Plot ==
The opera takes place in Spain during the seventeenth century.

=== Act I ===
Don Alvaro, father of Chiara and Serafina, is a sea captain who was captured by pirates while sailing with Chiara from Cádiz to Mallorca; for ten years he has been a slave. Don Fernando is secretly his enemy, and has engineered things so that his disappearance appears to be treason, for which he has been convicted in absentia. He has had himself named Serafina's guardian; now she has grown older and more attractive, he plans to marry her for her fortune. But Serafina loves Don Ramiro, whose father is the mayor of Menorca. He asks her guardian for her hand. Don Fernando, unable to justify denying the request, must create a ruse. The story is explained by Agnese, keeper of the castle.

Don Meschino is in love with Agnese's daughter, Lisetta, and asks to marry her. She refuses, but at that moment a storm blows up, during which Don Alvaro and Chiara appear. They ask Agnese and Lisette for assistance, without revealing their identities.

That night, the pirate Picaro, a former servant of Don Fernando's, appears looking for work. Don Fernando offers him a reward to prevent Serafina's wedding. Picaro disguises himself as Don Alvaro and presents himself to the lovers; believing her father found, Serafina is persuaded to postpone her wedding. Chiara arrives disguised as a beggar, but is not recognized by her sister. She and the true Don Alvaro confuse Picaro, who repents and promises assistance, but then flees.

=== Act II ===
In search of their leader, the pirates storm the castle, capturing Don Meschino, Lisetta, and Chiara. Picaro enters, now undisguised, and frees the prisoners. The sisters are reunited, and Don Ramiro swears eternal love to Serafina. In the end, all believe that Chiara has fled with the pirates, but she returns with Picaro.

== Recordings ==
One number from Chiara e Serafina has been recorded by Opera Rara and released as part of an anthology.

- 2022 (Blu-ray/DVD): Chiara e Serafina, Pietro Spagnoli as Don Meschino, Fan Zhou as Serafina, Greta Doveri as Chiara, Hyun-Seo Davide Park as Don Ramiro, Sung-Hwan Damien Park as Picaro, Valentina Pluzhnikova as Lisetta, Mara Gaudenzi as Agnese, Andrea Tanzillo as Spalatro, Giuseppe de Luca as Gennaro; Coro dell'Accademia Teatro alla Scala, Orchestra Gli Originali, conducted by Sesto Quatrini. Performed on original instruments and recorded at Teatro Sociale (Bergamo), 4 December 2022. Label: Dynamic, 2024.
