= Cenobio Paniagua =

Mexican composer

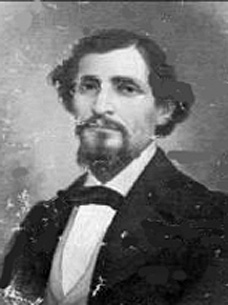
Cenobio Paniagua (1821–1882)

Cenobio Paniagua y Vásques (September 30, 1821, Tlalpujahua, Michoacán – November 2, 1882, Córdoba, Veracruz) was a Mexican musician and composer, who is known for both his romantic operas and his religious music.

== Biography ==
Paniagua's first music teacher was his uncle, Eusebio Vázquez. He studied various instruments in his youth in the city of Toluca, State of Mexico. He created some of his first salon pieces during this time, which were received well. Encouraged by this success, he set his sights on Mexico City. After several failed attempts to secure instruction from José Antonio Gómez, he decided to study at his own direction using foreign methods before completing his studies in violin and becoming the Second Conductor of the Cathedral Orchestra of Mexico City. In 1852, he received and, for six years, hosted his compatriot Miguel Meneses, to whom he taught musical composition and who subsequently worked for him at the Metropolitan Cathedral Orchestra.

Paniagua took the initiative to create his first opera; and, finding no available librettos or librettists, he selected one by Felice Romani — Vincenzo Bellini’s librettist — and brought to life his first work, titled Catalina de Guisa. This three-act opera premiered on September 29, 1859, at the Gran Teatro Nacional in Mexico City, and was dedicated to General and Mexican president Miguel Miramón. The success he achieved with this debut work encouraged him to establish the Academy of Harmony and Composition, where Melesio Morales, Mateo Torres Serratos, Miguel Planas, Ángela Peralta, and Miguel Meneses would go on to study.

At that institute, operas were created such as Cleotilde de Coscenza by Octaviano Valle; Adelaida y Comingio by Ramón Vega; Atala, Agorante, Rey de Nubia, and La Reina de las Hadas by Miguel Meneses; and Romeo y Julieta and Ildegonda by Melesio Morales — works that were performed by his company, the first Mexican operatic enterprise. Between 1862 and 1863, he participated in various concerts organized by a group of liberal women led by Margarita Maza.

In 1863, he composed the opera Pietro d’Abano (1863), a work celebrating the defeat of the French army in Puebla in May of the previous year. That same year, he was accused of plagiarism. It was alleged that his work Catalina de Guisa was a copy of an Italian work titled "Marcos Visconti", composed in 1855, despite the fact that Paniagua had composed his work ten years earlier. Two years later, during the reign of Emperor Maximilian of Habsburg, he attempted to travel to Havana, Cuba; however, after three-years, he relocated to Córdoba, Veracruz in 1868, where he lived until his death on November 2, 1882. He also composed the opera El paria, the oratorio Tobías, the short stage piece "El Paria, a Requiem", and more than 70 masses and various writings concerning music theory.

== Zevallos Paniagua Archive ==
On May 27, 2002, musicologists Eugenio Delgado and Áurea Maya announced the discovery and recovery of the musical archive of Cenobio Paniagua. The collection also comprises works by one of Cenobio Paniagua's sons, Manuel, as well as pieces by several of their contemporaries, both domestic and foreign composers. The aforementioned musicologists published a catalog of this archive through the Carlos Chávez National Center for Musical Research, Documentation, and Information (Cenidim). The catalog consists of 376 entries and includes 135 works by Paniagua, along with 20 more works attributed to him; 90 works by his son Manuel, and 40 more attributed to him; 28 works by other Mexican composers, 22 by European composers, and numerous pieces of anonymous origin. Among the most outstanding materials are the manuscripts for the aforementioned opera Catalina de Guisa, albeit incomplete, as only the full orchestral score for the third act was located, along with the piano-reduction scores for the first and third acts; for the second act, only the prompter's guide survives. Nevertheless, the complete vocal parts for the entire work—from beginning to end—are present in the collection. Also discovered was Paniagua's second opera, Pietro d’Abano; while the full orchestral score is missing, both the vocal-piano reduction and the individual instrumental parts were found.

Further investigations led to the discovery of another opera, one previously unrecorded in historical accounts, titled Clementina. In contrast, the archive yielded no material whatsoever regarding the opera El paria, despite it being widely documented in historical records.

Also uncovered were six zarzuelas, a genre the composer was not previously known to have explored, as well as a string quartet.

Choral works, pieces for small orchestra and wind band, psalms, oratorios, pastorelas (nativity plays), and piano pieces complete the catalog, alongside various theoretical writings covering subjects such as solfège, harmony, vocal exercises, and double bass methods. Delgado notes that once the catalog has been published, the next step will be to digitize the material for online distribution and, eventually, to produce a CD-ROM. They also plan to launch a series of editions of the works that, in their judgment, are the most interesting.

== Works ==
=== Operas ===
- Catalina de Guisa (1859)
- Pietro d’Abano (1863)
- El paria
- Clementina
- 6 Zarzuelas (neither published nor performed)
- Various Pastorelas (neither published nor performed)

=== Religious Music ===
- 70 masses
- Réquiem
- Salmos
- Las Siete palabras
- La Pasión de Jesucristo

=== Chamber Music ===
- Cuarteto No. 1 (string quartet)

== Sources ==
- Orrego-Salas, Juan (2001). "Paniagua y Vasques, Cenobio". In Sadie, Stanley; Tyrrell, John (eds.). The New Grove Dictionary of Music and Musicians (2nd ed.). London: Macmillan Publishers. ISBN 978-1-56159-239-5.
- Orrego-Salas, Juan. Paniagua y Vasques, Cenobio, Grove Music Online, ed. L. Macy (consultado el 27 March de 2010), grovemusic.com (accessed with subscription).
- Musacchio, Humberto. Gran Diccionario Enciclopédico de México Visual. Tomo III, p. 1457. México, 1989.
