= Carlo Evasio Soliva =

Italian composer

Carlo Evasio Soliva (27 November 1791 – 20 December 1853) was a Swiss-Italian composer of opera, chamber music, and sacred choral works. Soliva was born in Casale Monferrato, Piedmont to a family of Swiss chocolatiers who had emigrated from the canton of Ticino. He studied pianoforte and composition at the Milan Conservatory.

A contemporary of Gioacchino Rossini, he is best known for his 1816 opera La testa di bronzo ("The head of bronze"), which prompted Stendhal’s immediate enthusiasm: “Ce petit Soliva a la figure chétive d'un homme de génie.” (“That little Soliva has the scanty figure of a man of genius.”) After a life spent composing, teaching, and conducting in Italy, Poland, Russia, Switzerland, and France, he died in Paris at the age of 62.

The "Carlo Evasio Soliva Competition for Piano and Chamber Music," organized by the Istituto Musicale Soliva, is held annually in the town of his birth.

== Professional life ==
At the Milan Conservatory, he was at the top of his class. He soon became a conductor at La Scala and "drew inspiration for his music from Mozart, whose music was then fashionable in Milan," his operas being performed frequently from 1807 onwards. When La Scala organized a competition for new librettists in April 1816, the jury gave the top prize to Felice Romani but chose the novice Carlo Soliva to compose the music. His work was in Mozart's style and was well-received by local audiences. The following year his first opera, La testa di bronzo o sia La capanna solitaria, was an immediate and resounding success, but it marked the apex of his popularity. The opera received a record 47 performances in the 1816-1817 season. In 1817 his second opera, Berenice d'Armenia, received its premiere in Turin, and his third, La zingara delle Asturie, played at La Scala. Neither was received with great warmth, but in 1818 Giulia e Sesto Pompeo was a fiasco at La Scala.

But as has been noted:

The very reason for Soliva's initial success eventually doomed his career as an operatic composer. Rossini's new style of music was taking all the European stages by storm, and it ended the Milanese Mozart renaissance. After performances of La clemenza di Tito in 1819, Mozart disappeared from the programs of the La Scala Theater for more than 50 years. Soliva saw no future for his musical style and focused instead on a career as a conductor and teacher. He continued composing sacred vocal works, however, as well as orchestral, chamber, and piano music.

In 1821 he moved to Poland and became director of singing at the conservatory in Warsaw. There he married one of his students, Maria Kralewska, and became friendly with Frédéric Chopin. He was the conductor in November 1830 for the first performance of Chopin’s piano concerto in E minor. In the turmoil that followed the defeat of the November Uprising, Soliva moved to St. Petersburg where he took up posts as conductor of the Royal Chapel and director of the Imperial Singing School. There he had contact with Mikhail Glinka.

From 1841 he lived in the Ticinese village of Semione in the Val di Blenio, where his father had been born.

Subsequently, he moved to Paris where he again met Chopin along with George Sand and probably moved in the circle of Cristina Trivulzio Belgiojoso. He dedicated a Salve Regina to her husband.

== Operas ==
- La testa di bronzo o sia La capanna solitaria, libretto by Felice Romani. 3 March 1816, Teatro alla Scala, Milan
- Berenice d'Armenia, libretto by Jacopo Ferretti. March 1817, Teatro Regio, Turin
- La zingara delle Asturie, libretto by Felice Romani. 5 August 1817, Teatro alla Scala, Milan
- Giulia e Sesto Pompeo, libretto by B. Perotti. 24 February 1818, Teatro alla Scala, Milan
- Elena e Malvina, libretto by Felice Romani. 22 May 1824, Teatro alla Scala, Milan
- Китайские девицы, или Три рода драматического искусства, Russian libretto based on Le cinesi by Metastasio. 1833[?], Большой театр, St Petersburg
