= The Dog of Montarges =

Dramatic performance in London and the US

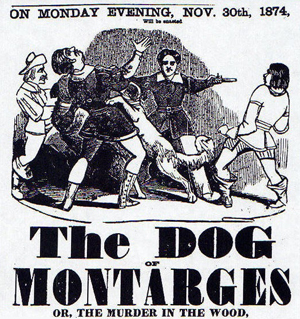
A British performance in 1874

The Dog of Montargis, or Murder in the Wood was a 19th-century melodrama, based on the tale of Robert Macaire and his trial-by-combat with a dog. It arose from the Parisian actor and theatre director René Charles Guilbert de Pixérécourt and premiered on 18 June 1814 as Le Chien de Montargis, ou la Forêt de Bondy, mélodrame historique en trois actes et à grand spectacle at the Parisian Théâtre de la Gaîté on Boulevard du Temple, where it had an uninterrupted run in that theatre's repertoire until 1834. Like many melodramas, it had several English-language adaptations. John Fawcett, manager of the Theatre Royal, Covent Garden, applied on September 17, 1814 for a license to present a two-act adaptation by William Barrymore, originally titled Murder Will Out with the alternate and more commonly used title The Dog of Montargis, or, The Forest of Bondy. The first performance was September 30, 1814. Other adaptations followed, including an 1816 three-act version attributed to Sir Henry Bishop, and a two-act version by Thomas Dibdin. Versions were performed at many playhouses in London and in the United States throughout the nineteenth century.

A German translation by Ignaz Franz Castelli, with music by Ignaz von Seyfried, premiered on 4 October 1815 at Berlin's Königliche Schauspiele. It already had a competitor in Vienna in September 1815, with Joseph August Adam's Der Hund des Aubri de Montdidier, oder der Zweikampf auf der Insel Notre-Dame. Ein romantisches Schauspiel in vier Aufzügen, but this did not become generally accepted alongside Castelli and Pixérécourt's version, and the piece soon spread throughout Europe, even being given at Weimar for the great dog-lover Charles Augustus starring Charles Augustus's lover Karoline Jagemann.

== Summary ==
The plot is based on a legend from the 14th century, that survived in a letter from Julius Caesar Scaliger. According to the legend:

"A French courtier of King Charles V (1338–80), Aubry de Montdidier, was murdered c. 1371 in the forest of Bondy, north of Paris. The only witness to De Montdidier’s murder was his dog, which pursued the perpetrator until he was captured; the murderer was Robert Macaire. The king ordered that Macaire, armed with a stick, and the dog should fight a duel, which took place on the Isle de Notre Dame. The dog won: Macaire confessed and was hanged." (Pickeral 134)

The best-known version, allegedly by Michel de Montaigne, was recorded as a handwritten note in a copy of his Essais (Apology for Raimond de Sebond, livre II/12, where Plutarch quoted a story about the dog); but this is certainly a forgery. Pixérécourt gives eight sources for its dramatisation, including Jean-Baptiste de La Curne de Sainte-Palaye and Philippe-Auguste de Sainte-Foix.

A statue of the fight is a landmark in the French community of Montargis.

== Dramatisation ==
The Dog of Montarges tells the story of a falsely accused mute and his acquittal. In the play, Dame Gertrude oversees an inn at which Eloi, Ursula and Bertrand work. They must entertain a group of soldiers (members of a higher class than that of the inn keepers) who have returned from battle. Upon the arrival of these soldiers, Colonel Gontram, Captain Aubri and the Lieutenants Macaire and Landry, the audience quickly learns that Aubri has been promoted to captain and given the hand of the general's daughter in marriage. Macaire and Landry are jealous, and plot his downfall.

That night, in the Forest of Bondy, through which Aubri with his dog, Dragon, is passing to deliver a packet on behalf of the Colonel, Macaire and Landry attack and murder Aubri. They bury his body, confident that nobody witnessed the crime. Dragon runs away and Macaire and Landry flee the scene.

The next morning, Eloi, the mute worker at the inn who is betrothed to Ursula, is accused of the murder of Aubri because he (Eloi) is found with a pocketbook full of gold that belonged to Aubri. Aubri had, in fact, given this gold to Eloi so that Eloi could deliver it to Aubri's mother in Paris in the event that anything were to happen to Aubri during his dangerous night journey through Bondy. The circumstantial evidence is taken to prove Eloi's guilt, and Eloi, mute and unable to defend himself, is condemned to death.

A series of events then clears Eloi's name. A sash is found by the dog Dragon near Aubri's body in the Forest of Bondy that belongs to a member of the visiting regiment. Urusula concludes that whoever does not have a sash is the murderer. However, Macaire, to whom the sash belongs, takes another sash from the body of Aubri and uses it to feign his innocence. Finally, Ursula sees the sword in Macaire's scabbard. She takes it out and says that she gave the knot of thread tied around the sword to Aubri. Macaire, succumbing to his conscience, admits his guilt and is condemned to death. He incriminates Landry, who tries to escape, but is chased and mauled by Dragon.

In the end he needs help from Aubry's dog Dragon. The dog is killed by Aubry's foes, but the murderer is recognized by using a belt with which he had tied the dog on the scene.

The name for the breed, Briard, is sometimes called Chien d'Aubry, so it is suggested that a trained Briard may have been used in the role of the dog in Pixérécourt's version. The success of the theatrical version resulted from a trained dog with a silent role, which allowed a pantomime actor to portray the silent servant Eloi accused of murdering his master Aubry. He can defend himself, but due to his disability does not.

Adaptations of the play emerged in England in the 19th century due to Victorian society having a "shared discomfort with the idea of an innocent dog being killed." (Recarte)

== Bibliography ==
- Brooks, Peter. The Melodramatic Imagination: Balzac, Henry James, Melodrama, and the Mode of Excess. 1976. New Haven and London: Yale UP, 1995.
- Brown, Howard G. Ending the French Revolution: Violence, Justice, and Repression From the Terror to Napoleon. University of Virginia Press, 2006.
- Edles, Laura Desfor, and Scott Appelrouth. "Max Weber's Types of Traditional Authority." Sociological Theory in the Classical Era, Third Edition.
- Hunt, Lynn. Politics, Culture, and Class in the French Revolution. University of California Press, 1984.
- Pickeral, Tamsin. The Spirit of the Dog an Illustrated History. Barron’s, 2012.
- Recarte, Claudia Alonso. "Canine Actors and Melodramatic Effects: The Dog of Montargis Arrives on the English Stage." Cahiers victoriens et édouardiens 86 Automne (2017). https://journals.openedition.org/cve/3345#quotation.
- René de Pixérécourt: Le Chien de Montargis ou La Forêt de Bondy, Paris: Barba 1814
- Gustaf Gründgens: „Der Hund des Aubry“, in: Ders., Wirklichkeit des Theaters, Frankfurt am Main: Suhrkamp 1953, S. 82–110
- Harald Wentzlaff-Eggebert: „Le Chien de Montargis“, in: Klaus Manger (Hrsg.): Goethe und die Weltkultur. Heidelberg: Winter 2003, S. 403–424. ISBN 3-8253-1499-5
