= Carlo Valentini =

Sammarinese footballer

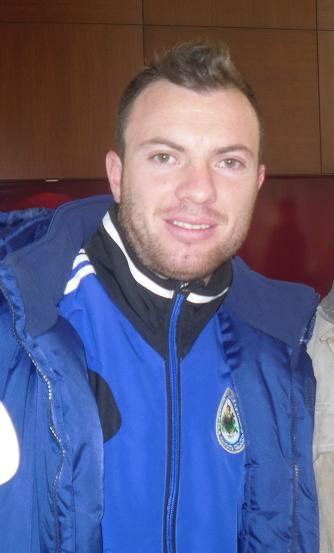

Personal information
- Full name: Carlo Valentini
- Date of birth: March 15, 1982 (age 44)
- Place of birth: San Marino
- Position: Midfielder

Team information
- Current team: Murata

Senior career*
| Years | Team | Apps | (Gls) |
| 2003–2004 | SP Domagnano | | |
| 2004–2006 | S.S. Virtus | | |
| 2006–2007 | Sporting Novafeltria | | |
| 2007–2008 | Sporting NovaValmarecchia | | |
| 2008–2013 | S.S. Murata | 42 | (17) |
| 2013–2014 | S.P. Tre Penne | 7 | (0) |
| 2014–2017 | S.S. Murata | 36 | (6) |
| 2017–2018 | A.C. Libertas | 10 | (1) |
| 2018–2021 | S.P. La Fiorita | 15 | (1) |
| 2021–2023 | S.S. Murata | 45 | (3) |

International career^{‡}
| 2002–2017 | San Marino | 46 | (0) |
- * Club domestic league appearances and goals as of 17 June 2023 ‡ National team caps and goals as of 2 June 2017

Carlo Valentini (born 15 March 1982) is a former San Marinese footballer who last played for S.S. Murata and formerly the San Marino national football team.
