= Giuseppe Mazza (composer) =

Giuseppe Mazza (March 3, 1806, Lucca – June 20, 1885, Trieste) was an Italian composer, conductor, and organist.

== Career ==
Mazza studied composition with Stanislao Mattei, the teacher of Gaetano Donizetti and Gioachino Rossini. His first opera, La vigilanza delusa, was successfully staged in his hometown of Lucca in 1826. This earned him a commission for his second opera, L'albergo incantato, which premiered at the Teatro della Pergola in Florence in 1828. After a third opera flopped in Naples, he transitioned away from composing to working as an opera conductor. In his later career he was the maestro di cappella and organist at Sant'Antonio Taumaturgo, Trieste; a post he held at the time of his death on June 20, 1885.
