= Duettino =

A duettino is an unpretentious duet with a concise form. Wolfgang Amadeus Mozart offers several well-known examples of the type, including "Là ci darem la mano" from Don Giovanni, "Canzonetta sull'aria" from Le Nozze Di Figaro and "Duettino No. 3" from La clemenza di Tito, a song only twenty-four measures long. He also described "Via resti servita" in The Marriage of Figaro as a duettino.

By the time of Gioachino Rossini, a duettino was a common part of the introduction of the farsa opera genre. Rossini composed several pieces in the form.
