= Carlo Coccia =

Italian composer (1782–1873)

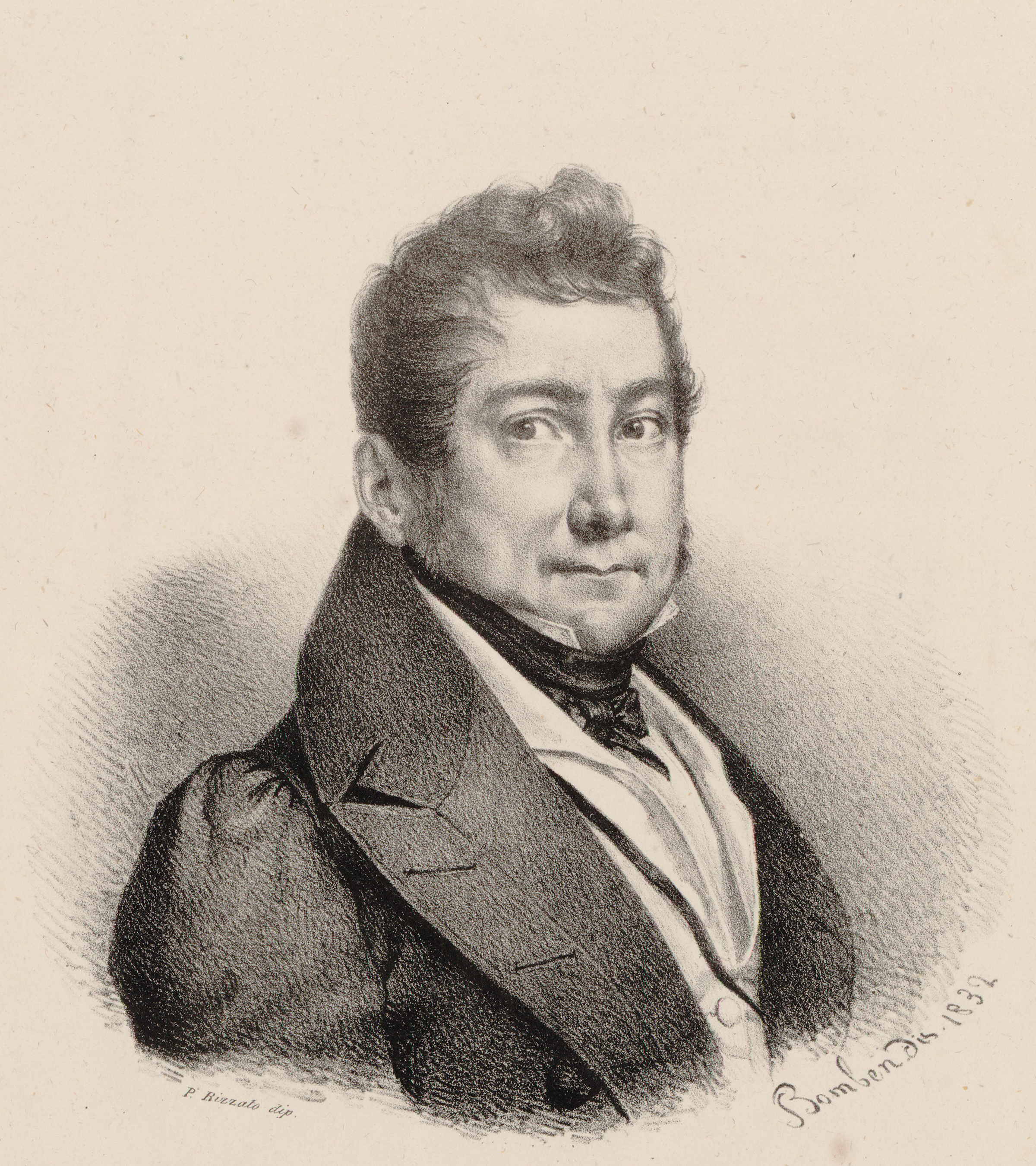
Composer Carlo Coccia

Carlo Coccia (14 April 1782 – 13 April 1873) was an Italian opera composer. He was known for the genre of opera semiseria.

== Life and career ==
Coccia was born in Naples, and studied in his native city with Pietro Casella, Fedele Fenaroli, and Giovanni Paisiello, who introduced him to King Joseph Bonaparte for whom he became the private musician. He wrote his first opera, Il matrimonio per lettera di cambio, in 1807, but it was a failure; however, the following year, with the help of Paisiello, his second opera, Il poeta fortunato, was well received.

He then moved to Venice, where he concentrated on opera semiseria, of which Clotilde from 1815, is perhaps the best example. Accused of imitating other composers, and of producing too many uneven operas in great haste, he was eventually eclipsed by the emerging Rossini, and left for Lisbon, where he remained from 1820 to 1823. He then settled in London in 1824, where he was conductor at His Majesty's Theatre. In 1827, he wrote Maria Stuarda for Giuditta Pasta, which, despite her and the celebrated bass Luigi Lablache being in the cast, was not successful, achieving only four performances.

Back in Italy, he concentrated on opera seria, and obtained some success with Caterina di Guisa, in 1833, but by then he had to compete with the likes of Donizetti and Bellini. Carlo Coccia contributed to a portion of Messa per Rossini, specifically the seventh section of II. Sequentia, Lacrimosa Amen.

He became Maitre de chapelle in Novara, Piedmont, in 1837, and director of the Music Conservatory of Turin, where he wrote his last opera in 1841. He died in Novara.

== Major works ==
- La donna selvaggia (1813)
- Caterina di Guisa (1833)
