= Yuliya Samoylova =

Yuliya Samoylova may refer to:

- Yuliya Samoylova (countess) (1803–1875), Russian countess
- Yuliya Samoylova (singer) (born 1989), contemporary Russian singer
