= Horsewoman (Bryullov) =

Painting by Karl Bruyllov

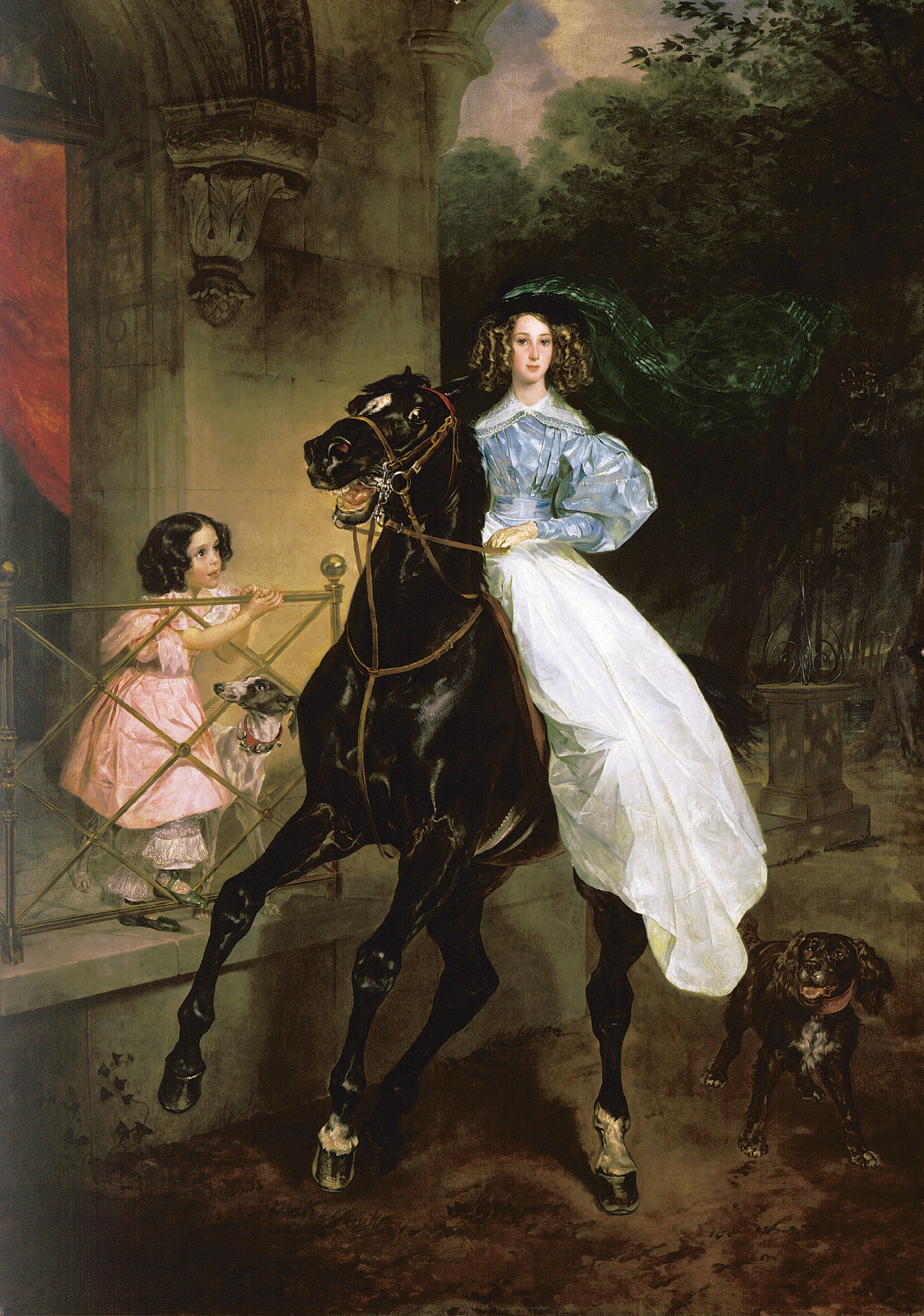
- Artist: Karl Bryullov
- Year: 1832
- Type: Oil on canvas
- Dimensions: 291,5 cm × 206 cm (1,148 in × 81 in)
- Location: Tretyakov Gallery, Moscow

Horsewoman is a painting by the Russian artist Karl Bryullov (1799–1852), produced in 1832 and preserved in the State Tretyakov Gallery in Moscow (inventory no. 212). The size of the canvas is 291.5 × 206 cm (according to other sources 293 × 209.8 cm).

The painting was commissioned by Countess Yuliya Samoylova in Milan. In the same year, 1832, it was exhibited at the Brera Academy of Fine Arts in Milan, where it was highly praised by the public and critics. In their reviews, the Italians compared Bryullov to Peter Paul Rubens and Antonis van Dyck and wrote that they had not yet seen "an equestrian portrait conceived and executed with such excellence".

For almost forty years, almost nothing was known about the painting, which was part of the collection of Yuliya Samoylova. In 1872 or 1874, shortly before the death of the bankrupt Samoylova, her property was sold in Paris. At the auction "Horsewoman" was bought by one of the commissioners. Then it went to the St. Petersburg Society for the Pledge of Movable Property, where it was bought by Pavel Tretyakov in 1893.

For a long time it was believed that the painting was of Julia Samoilova herself. Later art historians came to the conclusion that Samoilova's pupil Giovannina was represented as a horsewoman, and the model for the little girl was Amacilia, the daughter of composer Giovanni Pacini and Samoilova's adopted daughter.

Art historian Olga Lyaskovskaya wrote that the creation of "Horsewoman" was "a significant step forward in achieving the new goals set by the artist". According to the art historian Magdalina Rakova, "Horsewoman" is "a typical example of a portrait painting" in which "everything is conceived as an apotheosis of beauty and cheerful youth, as an apotheosis of the serenity of the feeling of life", and all this is contained in two actors: a young horsewoman and a little girl.

== History ==
=== Past events, work on the painting and the Milan exhibition ===
After graduating from the Imperial Academy of Arts in 1821 and receiving a large gold medal, Karl Bryullov went abroad in 1822. He was accompanied by his brother, the architect Alexander Bryullov. As scholars of the Imperial Society for the Encouragement of the Arts, the brothers first visited Germany. In 1823 they arrived in Italy and settled in Rome.

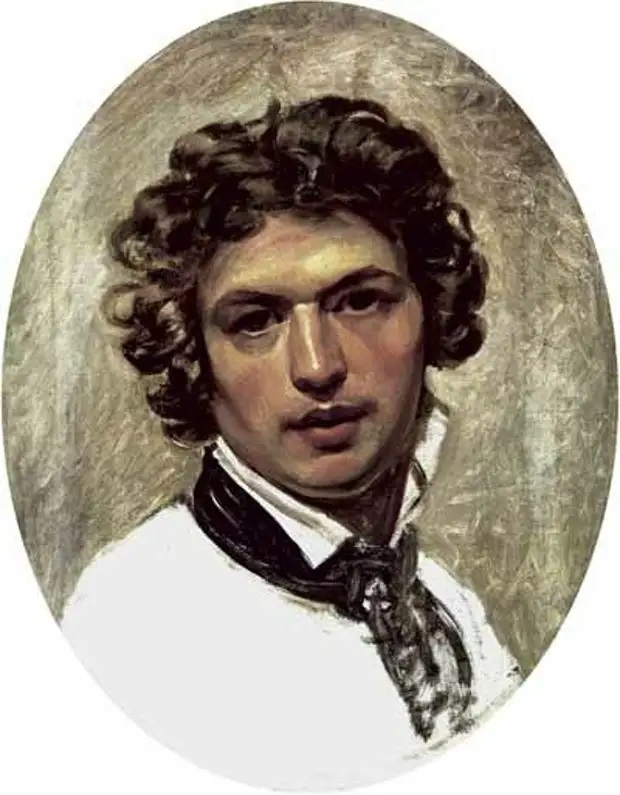
Karl Bryullov. Self-Portrait (early 1830s, private collection)

During his first years in Italy, Karl Bryullov worked on genre paintings of Italian life and created "Italian Morning" (1823), "Italian Afternoon" (1827), and "Girl Gathering Grapes in the Neighborhood of Naples" (1827). In 1825–1828, he worked on a copy of the Raphael's "School of Athens" commissioned by the Russian Embassy in Rome. In 1827, Karl Bryullov visited the excavations of Pompeii, where he decided to create a painting dedicated to the death of this city. Since 1827 he worked on sketches, and in 1830 he began the final version of a large multi-figure canvas "The Last Day of Pompeii", work on which continued until 1833.

In 1827 Bryullov met the Countess Yuliya Samoylova in Rome. It happened either in the art salon of Princess Zinaida Volkonskaya or in the house of the Russian envoy Grigory Gagarin. Later, Samoylova and Bryullov were connected by a long-lasting close friendship; according to Grand Duke Nicholas Mikhailovich of Russia, "the famous K. Bryullov had feelings for her stronger than friendship: he endlessly painted her portraits and repeated her image in his paintings". The painting "Horsewoman" was commissioned by Samoylova: Bryullov painted it in Milan in 1832, at the same time when he was still working on "The Last Day of Pompeii". Apparently, the artist created "Horsewoman" in the villa which belonged to Yuliya Samoylova – historians and journalists Ivan Bocharov and Yuliya Glushakova, who managed to visit this house, reported that Bryullov depicted on his painting "the corner of that very building". According to them, "the horsewoman is depicted at the portal of an ancient palace-villa on the outskirts of Milan, now belonging to the descendants of Count J. P. Litta". Samoylova's house, the furnishings of which stood out with incredible luxury, was located on the "patrician mansions built up" street Borgonuovo.

In the same year, 1832, "Horsewoman" was exhibited at the Brera Academy of Fine Arts. The painting aroused great interest, there were many reactions, collected and translated by the artist Mikhail Zheleznov, Bryullov's student and his first biographer. In their reviews the Italians compared the author of "Horsewoman" with Peter Paul Rubens and Antonis van Dyck. The poet Felice Romani wrote: "What we certainly admire in this work, which is really new to us in terms of genre and subject, is the freedom, courage and ease in its execution". A detailed review of the painting was also given in the article "Fine Arts in Milan in 1832" (Italian: Le belle arti in Milano nell anno 1832), published in the September 1832 issue of the magazine "Nuovo Ricoglitore". The article's authors, writer-journalists Defendente Sacchi and Giuseppe Sacchi, claimed they had never seen "such an excellently conceived and executed equestrian portrait". Noting the merits of Bryullov's painting, they wrote: "The horse <...> beautifully drawn and staged, <...> moves, hot, snorts, roars. The girl riding it is a flying angel. The artist has overcome all difficulties like a true master: his brush glides freely, smoothly, without hesitation, without tension; he knows how to soften or intensify the light with the skill and understanding of a great artist who distributes it. This portrait shows him to be a promising painter and, above all, a painter marked by genius".

=== Next events ===
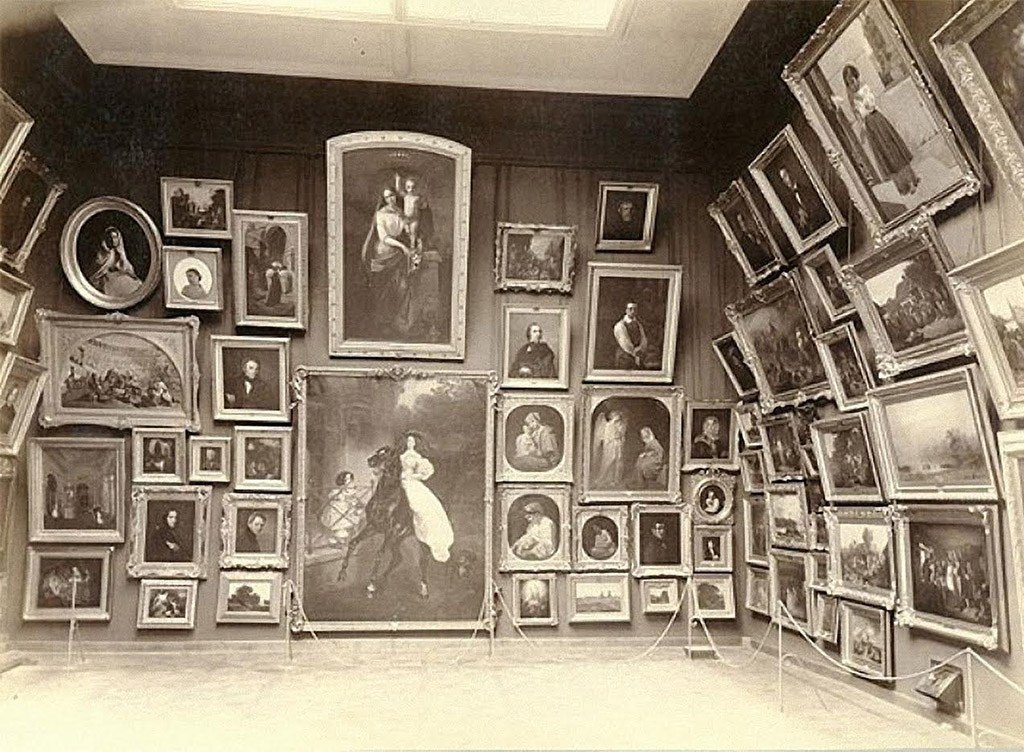
"Horsewoman" and Other Paintings in the Tretyakov Gallery (Photo by Carl Fischer, 1898)

After that, the painting was in the collection of Yuliya Samoylova. It probably decorated the interior of her Milan villa, according to some contemporaries, especially the poet Vasily Zhukovsky, who visited the place in 1838. For several decades, nothing was known about the painting. The next mention of the painting dates back to the first half of the 1870s. Her property was sold out at an auction which took place in Paris shortly before the death of the ruined Samoylova. Some sources say the auction occurred in 1872, others in 1874. In a letter from Paris dated 6 (18) July 1874, the artist Ilya Repin wrote to Pavel Tretyakov: "Bogolyubov asked me to inform you that some Countess Samoylova has some things by K.P. Bryullov for sale, if you need them". Samoylova was the owner of the painting until 1873, according to the catalog of the Tretyakov Gallery.

At the auction, "Horsewoman" was bought by the commissioner J.-F. Duloup, who bought two works: the Bryullov's "Horsewoman" and another painting by Vladimir Borovikovsky. Apparently, it was Jules-Philippe (Julius Filippovich) Duloup who was listed as a commissioner of the Imperial Academy of Arts in Paris (in 1872 he received the title of honorary free member of the Imperial Academy of Arts). It was rumored that Duloup acquired the paintings for Pavel Tretyakov; some sources quote a letter Tretyakov received from an unknown person, which reads "The other day I came from Paris. Leaving, was at the auction of Countess Samoilova, where Duloup bought as if for you two paintings: Briullov for 4050 francs and Borovikovsky for 3400 francs. I am telling you this as a good man you are, because I know Duloup as someone too commercial".

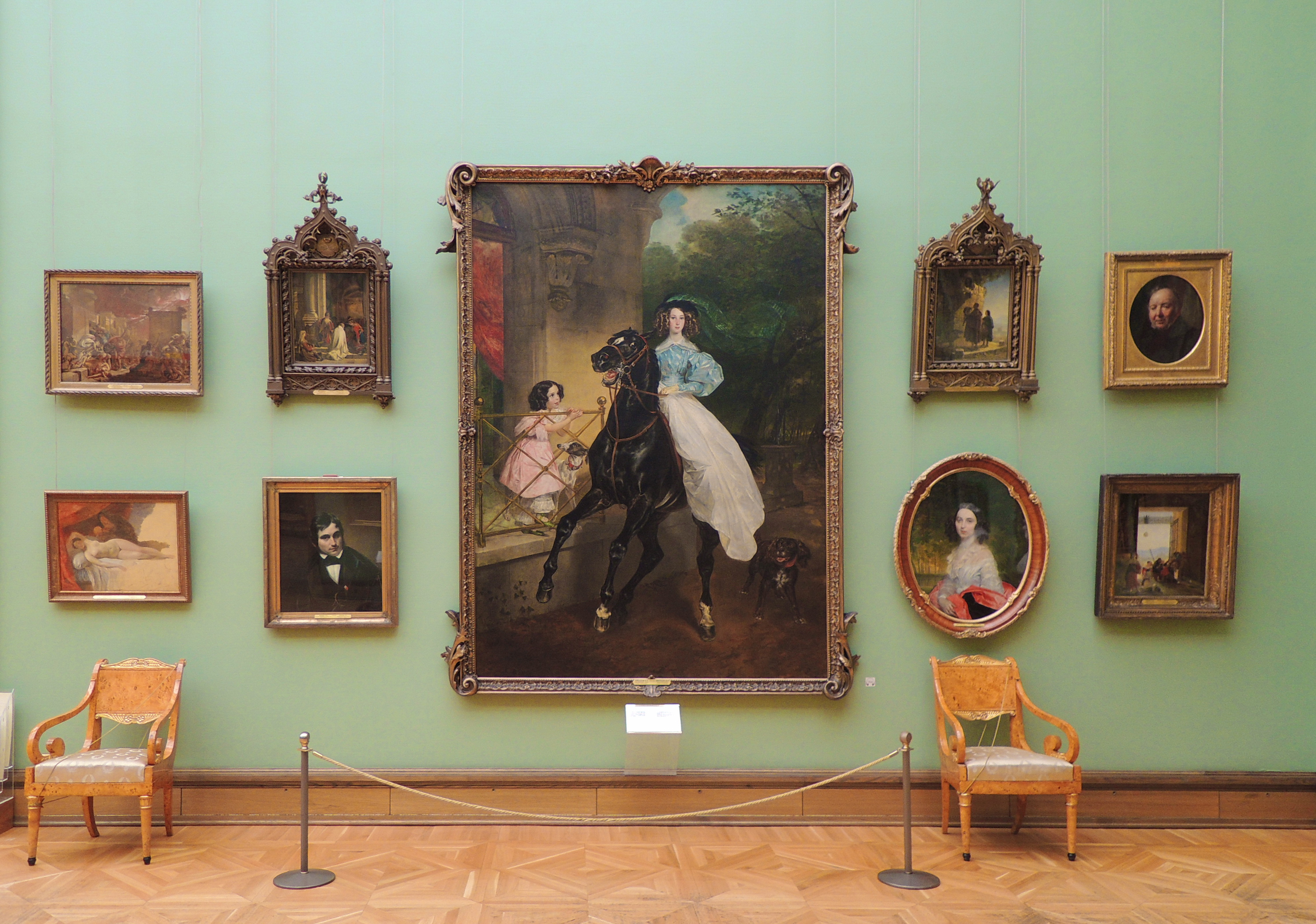
"Horsewoman" in the Tretyakov Gallery

Nevertheless, "Horsewoman" did not come to Tretyakov immediately. According to some sources, the painting stood unnoticed in the building of the St. Petersburg Academy of Arts for several years in the 1880s, and only in 1893 was it acquired by Tretyakov through the St. Petersburg Society for Mortgaging Movable Property. On 27 February 1893, the Art Department of the Society gave Tretyakov a receipt confirming that the painting "The Horsewoman" had been sold to him for 2000 rubles and that they had received the full amount. The inventory of works of art of the City Gallery of Pavel and Sergei Tretyakov was published in the same year, 1893. The art critic Vladimir Stasov, having seen the title "Horsewoman" in this inventory, asked Pavel Mikhailovich to remind him what this painting was. Tretyakov replied: "You know it very well. It was in the Academy for several years. Later Mr. Duloup sold it together with another painting from Paris and, I thinks, it was bought by Ginzburg. An excellent horse, and in general such an interesting thing!"

Since then, "Horsewoman" has been part of the Tretyakov collection. Subsequently, the painting was exhibited at a number of exhibitions, including Bryullov's personal exhibition, held in the Tretyakov Gallery in 1950, and at the exhibition of the Academy of Arts of the Soviet Union, held in Moscow in 1983–1984. It was also one of the exhibits of the exhibition dedicated to the 200th anniversary of Bryullov's birth, which was held from December 1999 to May 2000 in the Mikhailovsky Palace, part of the State Russian Museum in St. Petersburg, and then from June 2000 to January 2001 in the New Tretyakov Gallery in Krymsky Val. Nowadays the painting "Horsewoman" is exhibited in room 9 of the main building of the Tretyakov Gallery in Lavrushinsky Lane.

== Description ==
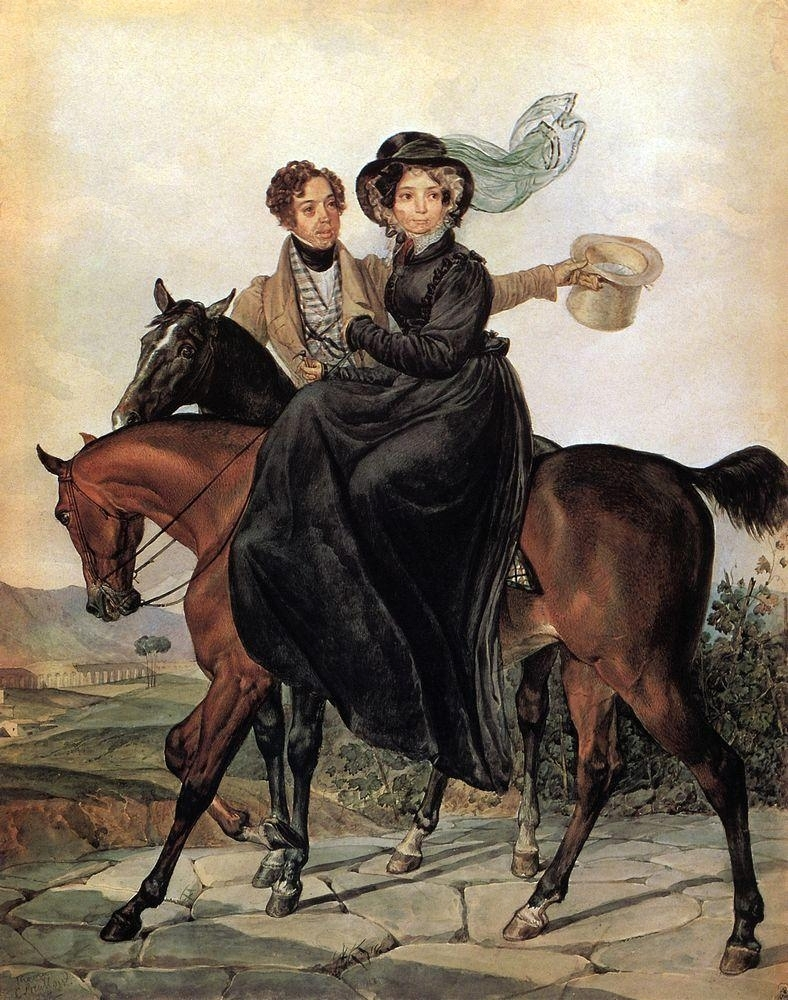
Karl Bryullov. Portrait of K.A. and M.Y. Naryshkin (watercolor, 1827, State Russian Museum)

=== Plot and Composition ===
The portrait is a genre painting. A young girl, mounted on a black horse after a morning walk, rides up to the open terrace of a rich villa. A little dressed girl, who has run out of the house to meet her older friend, looks at her with admiring eyes, clinging to the metal railing of the terrace. A shaggy spaniel barks, circling under the horse's feet. The dog is positioned so that it "completes the triangle in which the group of the rider and her horse are inscribed". The suspense of the action is heightened by the landscape. The trees are tilted by the wind, and the clouds move anxiously across the sky.

The rider is portrayed as young and beautiful, and the horse serves "as a pedestal for her beauty". The rider is dressed in a fashionable, elegant costume designed for riding. She wears a long, snow-white skirt and a blue silk blouse with sleeves that are narrow at the forearms and wide above the elbows. The girl's delicate waist is bound with a corset. The dark headdress shades "the soft tenderness of the ruddy face, the elastic curls of blond hair and the bright blue eyes". The girl's head is surrounded by a long, curved veil like by a halo. Apparently a similar veil was used by Bryullov in a double watercolor portrait of K.A. and M.Y. Naryshkin (according to another version, N.G. and Z.A. Volkonsky) in 1827. It is believed that this gauze veil was made of the rare fabric Gaze de Sylphide.

Wearing a pink dress, lace pantalettes and green slippers, the little black-haired girl stands on the terrace. Her lips are parted in admiration. Her brown eyes are full of emotion, and the gesture of her hands resembles applause. The girl in the pink dress serves as a "living link" between the viewer and the events on the canvas. However, she does not lose her independent significance – both as a portrait and as an integral part of the composition of the canvas – despite her subordination to the "protagonist". Next to the girl is a greyhound – in Italy these dogs were considered "an indispensable attribute of rich aristocratic families".

Visitors to the 1832 exhibition admired the Crow Horse depicted in the painting. One reviewer wrote: "Although one might think that the painting intends to preserve the features of the faces of the two girls at such a young age, when they are so often changing, the horse, which occupies most of the space of the picture, almost exclusively attracts the attention of the viewer, and perhaps it would not be impertinent to say that the painter also preferred it to everything else and concentrated his knowledge and effort in it". It is believed that the horse belonged to the "Orlov riding horse" breed, bred at the stud farm of Count Alexei Orlov-Chesmensky.

Fragments of the painting "Horsewoman"

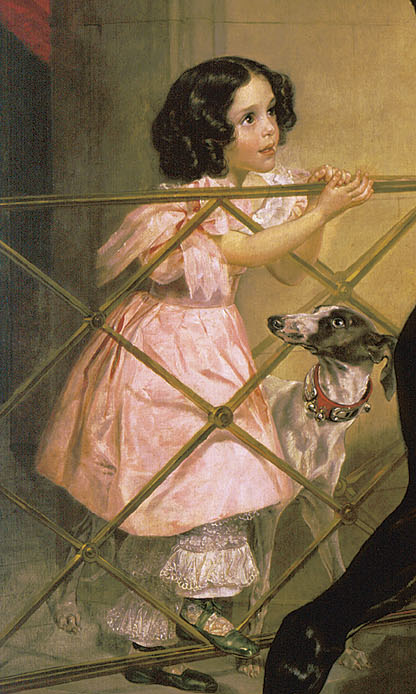
A girl with a greyhound

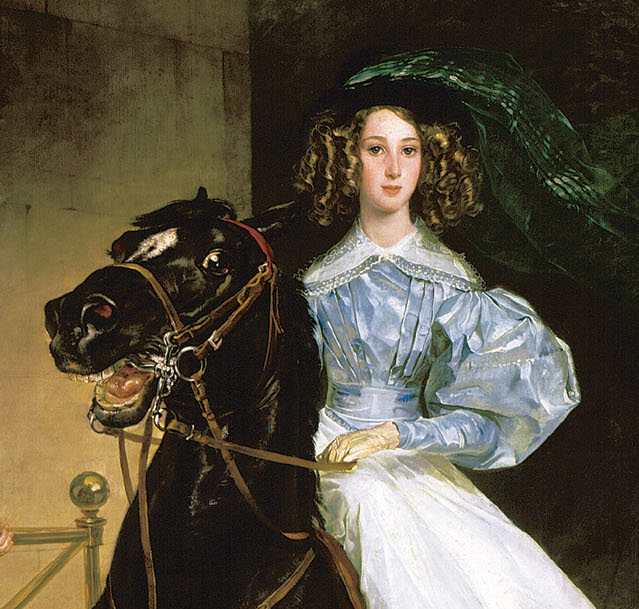
A horsewoman

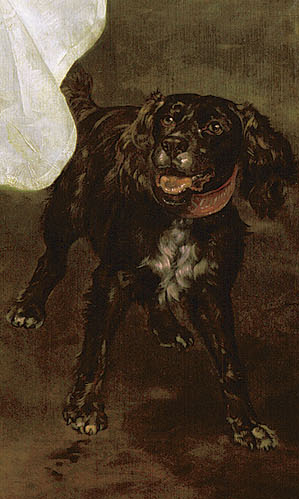
A dog at the horse's feet

=== Models ===
The painting appeared in the inventories and catalogs under the title "Horsewoman" in the first years after it entered the Tretyakov Gallery's collection. From 1909, however, its name was changed to "Portrait of the Countess Yuliya Pavlovna Samoylova" (this name was used in 1909–1916). Then it was again called "Horsewoman", but with the subtitle "Portrait of Y. Samoylova": in the Soviet art history literature this description was common until the end of the 1930s. The artist's inscription "Samoylo..." on the collar of the dog next to the horse was one of the reasons why the painting was considered Samoylova's portrait.

In a monograph on Bryullov's work published in 1940, the art historian Olga Lyaskovskaya made a comparative analysis of the image of the rider with the female images in "Portrait of the Countess Y. P. Samoylova with her pupil Giovannina Pacini and an Arapchonok" (1834, Hillwood, Washington) and the study "Portrait of Giovannina" (1832, oil) in the Kiev Museum of Russian Art. On the basis of this comparison, Lyaskovskaya concluded that the model for the rider was Giovannina: according to her, "the charming stranger is the same teenage girl who, perhaps for the first time, put on a long amazon and beautified herself on horseback in front of invisible spectators". Afterwards, the art historian Esfir Aszarkina expressed the opinion that the sketch "Portrait of Giovannina" was not made by Brullov himself, but by one of his students, who made a copy of a large portrait.

Fragments of &quot;Portrait of Y. P. Samoylova with her pupil Giovannina and a black servant boy&quot;

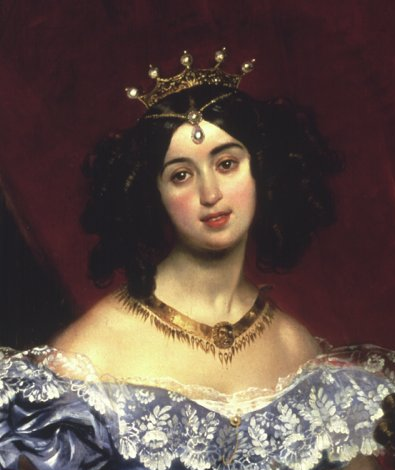
Y.P.Samoylova

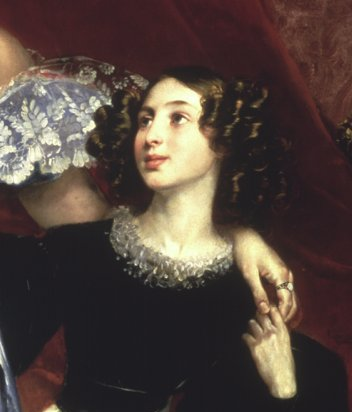
Giovannina
Fragments of &quot;Portrait of Y. P. Samoylova, leaving the ball with Amacilia Pacini&quot;

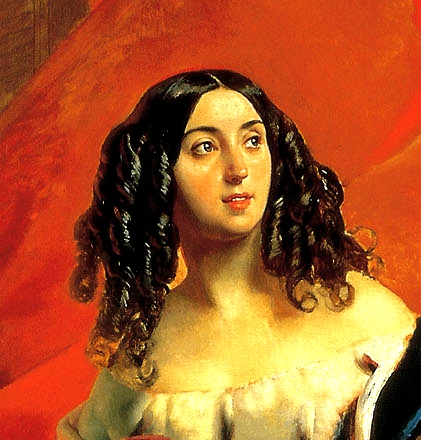
Y. P. Samoylova

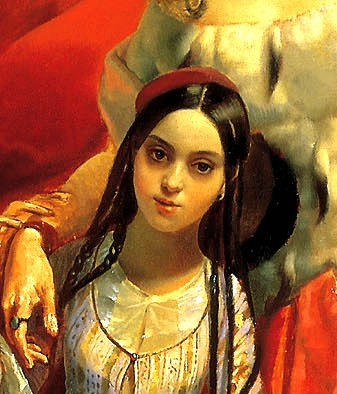
Amacilia

In a book on Bryullov's portraits written in 1956, the art historian Magdalina Rakova suggested that the little girl in the painting "Horsewoman" was another pupil of Countess Samoylova, Amacilia Pacini. This assumption was based on a comparison with "Portrait of Countess Y.P. Samoylova leaving a ball with her adopted daughter Amacilia Pacini" (no later than 1842, State Russian Museum). According to Rakova, there is an undeniable resemblance between the girl in the painting "Horsewoman" and Amacilia in the Russian Museum portrait, "felt in the lines of the oval face, in the shape of the eye sockets, eyebrows, in the drawing of the lips", and "the difference in age between them may well be calculated by the seven or eight years that separate the second portrait from the first". This conclusion was confirmed in a 1963 monograph by Esfiryu Atzarkina.

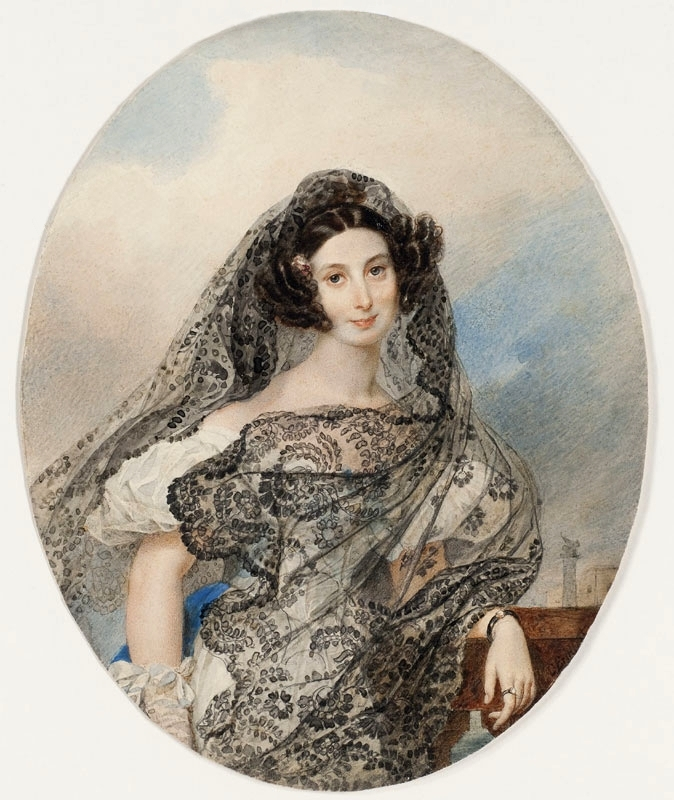
Karl Bryullov. Portrait of Giovannina Pacini (late 1820s or c. 1831, private collection)

There is another important drawing known as "Portrait of Giovannina Pacini" (paper, graphite pencil, watercolor, whitewash, varnish, oval 21.1 × 17.1 cm), kept in a private collection. According to some sources, Bryullov made it in the late 1820s, while others date it around 1831. In 2009, this portrait was sold for £289,000 (about $456,000) at an auction of Russian art from the collection of the French gallery Popoff at Christie's. However, not all researchers agree that the model was Giovannina – in some publications it appears under the title "Portrait of an Unknown".

Both Giovannina and Amazilia were raised by Countess Yuliya Samoylova. Born in 1827 or 1828, Amazilia was the daughter of the composer Giovanni Pacini, a friend of Samoylova. Samoylova took care of her after her mother died in childbirth. It was assumed that Giovannina was related to Amacilia and also bore the surname Pacini (according to some sources, Giovannina was the niece of Giovanni Pacini, that is, a cousin of Amacilia, and the age difference between them was about eight years). However, the journalist Nikolai Prozhogin managed to find in one of the publications a reference to a notarized deed of Samoilova, in which she bequeathed her house to "the orphan Giovannina Carmine Bertolotti, daughter of the deceased Don Gerolamo and Mrs. Clementina Perri", whom the Countess "took to herself". Thus, the question of Giovannina's origin requires further research.

There is another version, mentioned in the publications of historians and journalists Ivan Bocharov and Yuliya Glushakova, according to which Bryullov's painting does not depict Giovannina, but the singer Maria Malibran (1808–1836), who was fond of riding. This version is held by the staff of the Italian theater "La Scala", which keeps an old lithograph with the image of "Horsewoman", as well as a gift certificate from a certain I. Prado (or Preda), stating that the painting depicts Malibran. In particular, this version was cited by the Italian writer and music critic Eugenio Gara in his book They Sang at La Scala (Eugenio Gara, Cantarono alla Scala: Milano, Electa Editrice, 1975). Nevertheless, modern Russian art historians consider it a generally accepted fact that Brullov's painting depicts Countess Samoylova's pupils Giovannina and Amacilia.

== Reviews and critiques ==
The artist and critic Alexander Benois dedicated two chapters to the analysis of Bryullov's work in his book "History of Russian Painting in the 19th century", the first edition of which appeared in 1902. Without hiding his negative attitude to academic painting, Benois wrote that "among all the mass of Bryullov's works there are some in which his enormous talent still broke through". To such works Benois attributed a number of portraits, including "the brilliant, full-length, with a beautiful landscape behind it, 'Horsewoman'".

Art historian Olga Lyaskovskaya, in the monograph "Karl Bryullov" published in 1940, wrote that the famous "Horsewoman", painted in 1832, was "a significant step forward in the achievement of new goals set by the artist". Lyaskovskaya noted that in this work "the artist's mission goes beyond portraiture": he tries to unite all the creatures depicted on the canvas in a single action, as on the theatrical stage. At the same time, according to Lyaskovskaya, "the young artist is not yet free in depicting movement" – in particular, the lack of any tension in the rider's face does not correspond to the movement of the horse. Lyaskovskaya praised the artist's skill, noting: "The really lively figure of the girl and her lively face are remarkable".

In the book "History of Russian Art of the first half of the 19th century", published in 1951, the art historian Natalia Kovalenskaya wrote that unlike the portraits of the 18th century with their conventional decorative backgrounds, in such ceremonial portraits as "Horsewoman" Bryullov "brings a natural environment of life to the persons portrayed", thus approaching genre painting and realism. Along with the progressiveness of this approach, Kovalenskaya also noted its internal contradictions, which are particularly evident in the creation of "Horsewoman": on the one hand, "Bryullov could not afford to turn a ceremonial portrait into a simple genre scene" and to give a romantic interpretation to the image of a galloping horse, whose rapid running stops the rider, and on the other hand, "he did not dare to give the image of the rider itself that excitement which would be appropriate after such a turbulent race. Thus, according to Kovalenskaya, in the end Bryullov "achieves the necessary parade, using for this purpose neoclassical traditions still dear to the artist".

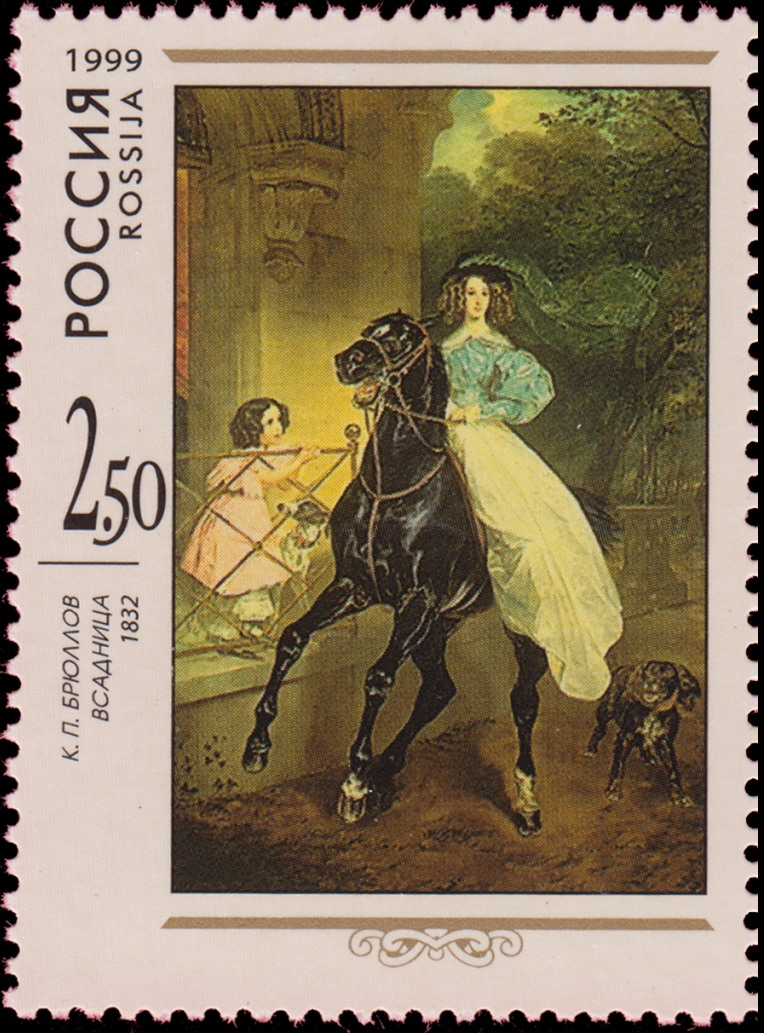
"Horsewoman" on 1999 Russian stamp

In the monograph "Karl Bryullov – portraitist", published in 1956, the art historian Magdalina Rakova called "Horsewoman" "a typical example of a portrait painting", in which all the characters are "united in a simple action, placed in the landscape, surrounded by various "four-legged friends". According to Rakova, this Bryullov's work "is conceived as an apotheosis of beauty and cheerful youth, as an apotheosis of the serenity of the feeling of life", and all this is contained in two actors – a young rider and a little girl. Rakova noted that "Horsewoman" fully reveals Bryullov's artistic mastery both in "solving the compositional portrait" and in "revealing a certain theme in the portrait".

Art historian Marina Shumova wrote that the peculiarity of Bryullov's ceremonial portraits was "a combination of representativity and vitality, conventionality and precise observation of life" in her book "Russian Painting of the first half of the 19th Century", published in 1978. According to Shumova, in the painting "Horsewoman" "the mastery of live observation is manifested in the expression of the little girl's face, in the tension of a sturdy horse, in the texture of objects, clothing", but at the same time "the graceful silhouette of the horsewoman" is completely static. Comparing "Horsewoman" with the painting "The Last Day of Pompeii," in which people remain beautiful despite the natural disaster, Shumova noted that in this painting "the majestic serenity of the young beauty makes her extraordinary," so that the canvas "becomes the embodiment of a romantic legend about a fabulously beautiful girl".

Vitaly Manin, an art historian, noted in his book "Russian Art of 19th century", published in 2005, that many of Bryullov's works were "addressed to high aristocracy". According to Manin, the canvas "manifested all the impassive beauty of Bryullov's mastery, the vitality of which was reduced by the staging of the composition and the conventionality of the perception of the object. The impenetrably calm face and figure of the rider contrast with everything that is or has been in motion – the girl running out onto the terrace, the horse stopping abruptly, the excited dog and the fluttering veil. According to Manin, Bryullov demonstrated his adherence to the plastic conservatism of academism by depicting the horsewoman "out of physical and mental movement".

== Bibliography ==
- Алдонина Р. П. Карл Брюллов. Графика. — М.: Белый город, 2015. — 166 p. — (Русская традиция). — ISBN 978-5-7793-4616-0
- Алленова О. А., Алленов М. М. Карл Брюллов. — М.: Белый город, 2000. — 64 p. — (Мастера живописи). — ISBN 978-5-7793-0229-6
- Ацаркина Э. Н. Карл Павлович Брюллов. Жизнь и творчество. — М.: Искусство, 1963. — 536 p. — (Русские художники. Монографии).
- Ацаркина Э. Н. К. П. Брюллов // В книге «История русского искусства», т. 8, кн. 2, ред. И. Э. Грабарь, В. С. Кеменов, В. Н. Лазарев. — М.: Наука, 1964. — P. 43—109.
- Безрукова Д. Я. Третьяков и история создания его галереи. — М.: Просвещение, 1970. — 144 p.
- Бенуа А. Н. История русской живописи в XIX веке. — М.: Республика, 1995. — 448 p. — ISBN 5-250-02524-2
- Бочаров И. Н., Глушакова Ю. П. Карл Брюллов и театр Ла Скала. Из итальянских изысканий // Наука и жизнь. — 1981. — № 5. — P. 120—126.
- Бочаров И. Н., Глушакова Ю. П. Карл Брюллов. Итальянские находки. — М.: Знание, 1984. — 192 p.
- Бочаров И. Н., Глушакова Ю. П. Кипренский. — М.: Молодая гвардия, 1990. — 365 p. — (Жизнь замечательных людей). — ISBN 5-235-01383-2
- Бочаров И. Н., Глушакова Ю. П. Итальянская Пушкиниана. — М.: Современник, 1991. — 444 p. — ISBN 5-270-00630-8
- Буткова О. В. Юлия Самойлова. Муза Карла Брюллова. — М.: РИПОЛ классик, 2017. — 224 p. — (AmorFati). — ISBN 978-5-386-08436-3
- Воронихина Л. Н., Михайлова Т. М. Русская живопись XIX века. — М.: Русский язык, 1990. — 319 p. — ISBN 978-5-200-00484-3
- Грязнов А. И. Почётный гражданин Москвы. Страницы жизни Павла Михайловича Третьякова. — М.: Московский рабочий, 1982. — 189 p.
- Железнов М. И. Заметка о К. П. Брюллове // Живописное обозрение. — 1898. — № 27—33.
- Калугина Н. А. Карл Брюллов. «Всадница». — М.: Государственная Третьяковская галерея, 2014. — 24 p. — (История одного шедевра). — ISBN 978-5-89580-060-7
- Коваленская Н. Н. История русского искусства первой половины XIX века. — М.: Искусство, 1951. — 196 p.
- Леонтьева Г. К. Картина К. П. Брюллова «Последний день Помпеи». — Л.: Художник РСФСР, 1985. — 72 p.
- Леонтьева Г. К. Карл Брюллов. — М.: Терра, 1997. — 462 p. — (Великие мастера живописи). — ISBN 978-5-300-00675-4
- Лясковская О. А. Карл Брюллов. — М.—Л.: Искусство, 1940. — 204 p.
- Манин В. С. Русская живопись XIX века. — М.: СоюзДизайн, 2005. — 312 p. — ISBN 5-900230-62-7
- Мусаликин В. «Среди рассеянной Москвы…»: новая иконографическая атрибуция известного портрета работы Карла Брюллова // Мир музея. — 2002. — № 5. — P. 24—28.
- Петинова Е. Ф. Русские художники XVIII — начала XX века. — СПб.: Аврора, 2001. — 345 p. — ISBN 978-5-7300-0714-7
- Пикулева Г. И. Брюллов. — М.: ОЛМА-ПРЕСС, 2004. — 125 p. — ISBN 978-5-94849-594-1
- Погодина А. А. К. Брюллов. «Всадница» // Юный художник. — 1982. — № 3. — P. 17.
- Прожогин Н. П. Брюлловская всадница и её необычайные приключения (часть 1) // Мир музея. — 1998. — № 1. — P. 33—38.
- Прожогин Н. П. Брюлловская всадница и её необычайные приключения (часть 2) // Мир музея. — 1998. — № 2. — P. 40—44.
- Прожогин Н. П. Русская графиня в Милане // Музыкальная жизнь. — 1998. — № 2. — P. 36—39.
- Ракова М. М. Брюллов — портретист. — М.: Искусство, 1956. — 160 p.
- Репин И. Е. Переписка с П. М. Третьяковым, 1873—1898 / М. Н. Григорьева, А. Н. Щекотова. — М.—Л.: Искусство, 1946. — 226 p.
- Шумова М. Н. Русская живопись первой половины XIX века. — М.: Искусство, 1978. — 168 p.
- Государственная Третьяковская галерея — каталог собрания / Я. В. Брук, Л. И. Иовлева. — М.: СканРус, 2005. — Т. 3: Живопись первой половины XIX века. — 484 p. — ISBN 5-93221-081-8
- К. П. Брюллов в письмах, документах и воспоминаниях современников / Н. Г. Машковцев. — М.: Издательство Академии художеств СССР, 1961. — 319 p.
- Почётные вольные общники Императорской Академии художеств. Краткий биографический справочник / Н. С. Беляев. — СПб.: Библиотека Российской академии наук, 2018. — 327 p. — ISBN 978-5-336-00234-8
- Русское искусство XVIII—XIX веков / Е. Е. Тагер, М. Н. Райхинштейн, А. И. Зотов, Н. И. Соколова. — М.—Л.: Искусство, 1938. — 192 p.
