= L'ultimo giorno di Pompei =

Opera composed by Giovanni Pacini

- Opera by Giovanni Pacini
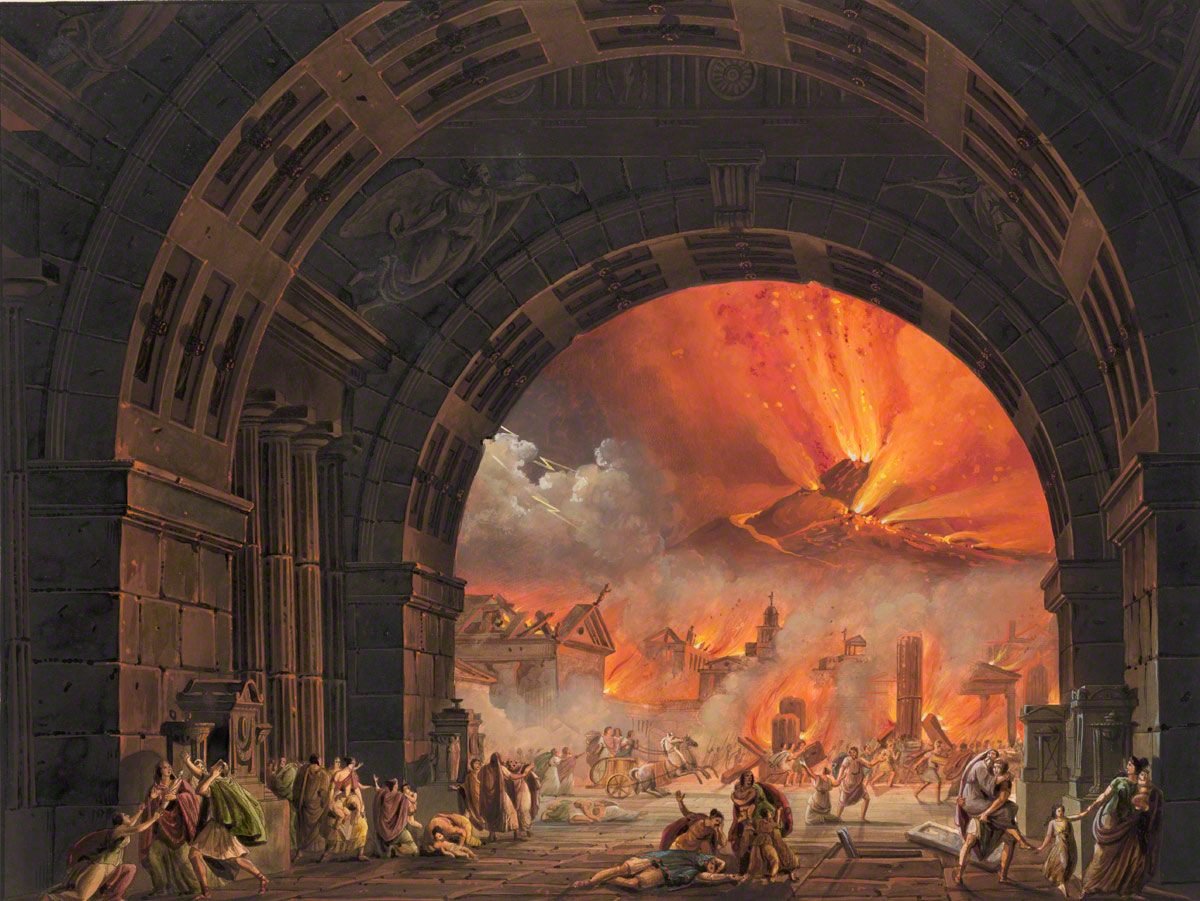
- The eruption of Vesuvius, the opera's climax, in Sanquirico's design for the 1827 La Scala production
- Librettist: Andrea Leone Tottola
- Premiere: 19 November 1825; Teatro San Carlo, Naples

L'ultimo giorno di Pompei ("The last day of Pompeii") is an opera (dramma per musica) in two acts composed by Giovanni Pacini to an Italian libretto by Andrea Leone Tottola. It premiered to great success at the Teatro San Carlo in Naples on 19 November 1825 followed by productions in the major opera houses of Italy, Austria, France, and Portugal. When Pacini's popularity declined in the mid-19th century, the opera was all but forgotten until 1996 when it received its first performance in modern times at the Festival della Valle d'Itria in Martina Franca. L'ultimo giorno di Pompei influenced either directly or indirectly several other 19th-century works, most notably Karl Bryullov's 1833 painting, The Last Day of Pompeii.

== Background and performance history ==
L'ultimo giorno di Pompei was the third of Pacini's operas to premiere at the Teatro San Carlo in Naples. It was commissioned to celebrate the name day of Queen María Isabella of the Two Sicilies. The libretto itself was written by Andrea Leone Tottola. However, the basic outline of the story and the idea of setting it in Pompeii at the time of the eruption of Mount Vesuvius in 79 AD came from the Teatro San Carlo's resident scenographer, Antonio Niccolini. Although the setting and the English translation of its title are similar to that of Bulwer-Lytton's novel The Last Days of Pompeii, the opera predates the novel by almost 10 years and has a completely different plot.

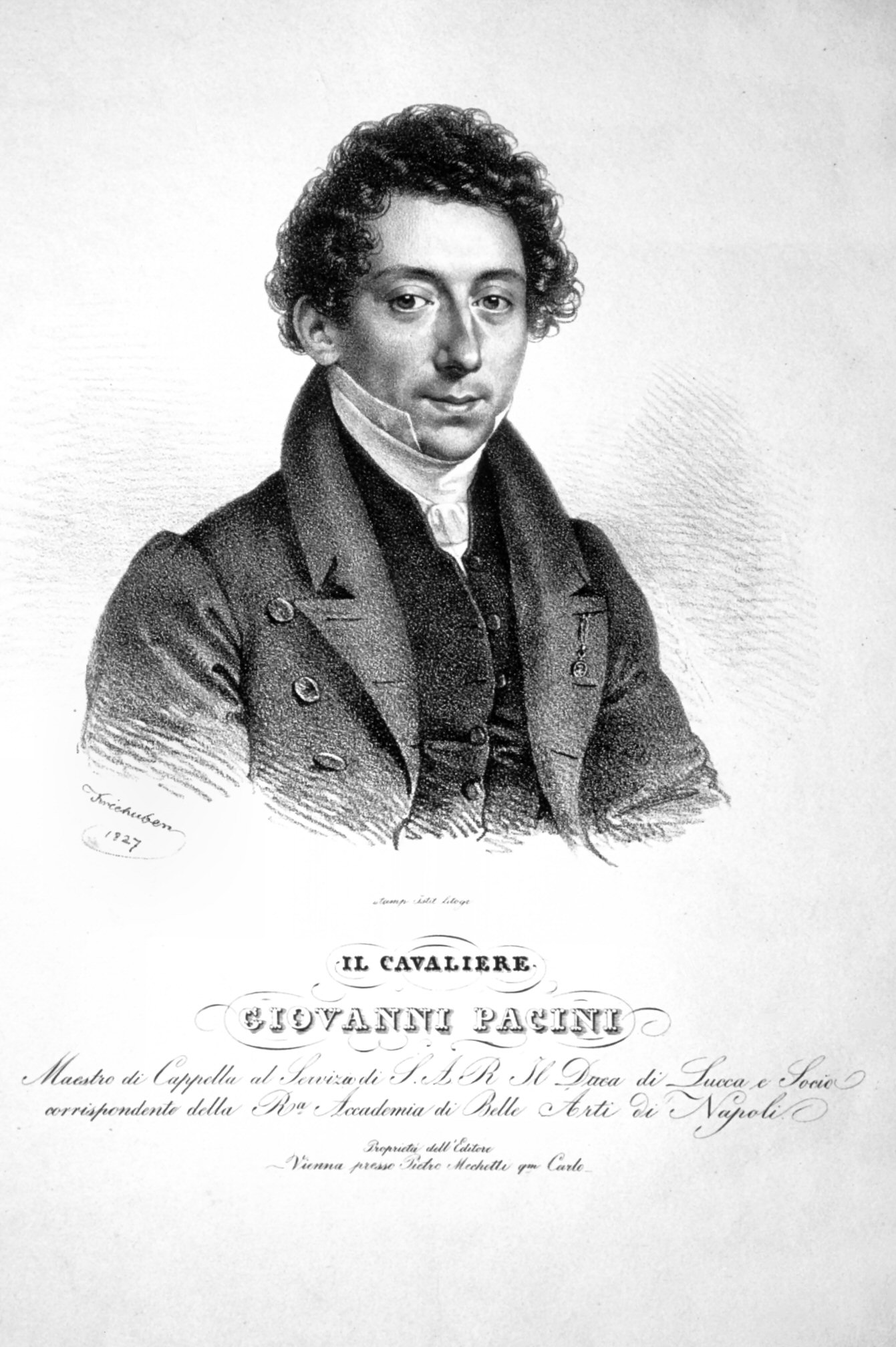
Giovanni Pacini, c. 1827

The opera premiered to great success on 19 November 1825. Nicolini's production was an expensive extravaganza involving numerous changes of sets, complex lighting, and the use of real explosives. The spectacular climax depicting the fiery eruption of Mount Vesuvius was accompanied by a simulated earthquake and lightning as nine gauze curtains painted with clouds of ash and fire were raised one after the other to reveal the volcano. According to a contemporary account, when molten lava appeared to flow towards the front of the stage, the effect was so realistic that people in the stalls were terrified. The set designs for the Naples premiere have been lost. However, multiple copies of Alessandro Sanquirico's designs for the 1827 La Scala production have been preserved. Kenneth Lapitan, a curator at the J. Paul Getty Museum, has proposed that Sanquirico's designs probably followed Nicolini's production quite closely.

Detail of Bryullov's 1833 paintingThe Last Day of Pompeii. Pacini's daughters are depicted as children sheltering in the arms of a Pompeian woman.

The day after the premiere, King Francis I of the Two Sicilies sent Pacini a congratulatory letter expressing his great pleasure with the performance. He appointed Pacini to the Royal Academy of Fine Arts and ordered that Tottola be granted a bonus of 30 ducats. In his 1865 memoirs, Pacini described L'ultimo giorno di Pompei as the greatest triumph of his early career. The opera ran for four seasons at the San Carlo and was subsequently performed at La Scala in Milan and the Theater am Kärntnertor in Vienna (1827), the Theatro de São Carlos in Lisbon (1828), the Théâtre-Italien in Paris (1830), and La Fenice in Venice (1832). The reception at La Scala was as enthusiastic as it had been in Naples, and on the strength of the opera's success there, the impresario Domenico Barbaia offered Pacini a nine-year contract as the artistic director of his theatres with a commission to compose two operas a year.

Pacini's popularity had declined in the mid-19th century. By the time of his death in 1867, L'ultimo giorno di Pompei was all but forgotten until August 1996 when it received its first performance in modern times at the Festival della Valle d'Itria in Martina Franca. The production then transferred to the Teatro Massimo Bellini in Catania for performances in September of that year. A live recording of the Martina Franca performance was released by Dynamic Records in 1997 and re-released in 2012.

== Influence on other works ==
L'ultimo giorno di Pompei influenced either directly or indirectly several other 19th-century works. When word had reached Paris of the 1827 La Scala production, which the Revue de théâtre described as representing the eruption of Vesuvius "with a frightful truth and a grandeur unthinkable in France," the French scenographer Pierre Cicéri travelled to Milan to study Sanquirico's designs and stage machinery. He incorporated several of those elements into his staging of Auber's 1828 opera La muette de Portici which featured a 17th-century eruption of Vesuvius. Pacini's opera was also one of the inspirations for Karl Bryullov's painting, The Last Day of Pompeii. The painting incorporates portraits of Pacini's young daughters, Amazilia and Giovannina, depicted as children sheltered in the arms of a Pompeian woman. The model for the woman was Yuliya Samoylova who was the foster mother of Pacini's daughters and had been the lover of both Pacini and Bryullov. In turn, Bryullov's painting inspired Bulwer-Lytton's widely read novel, The Last Days of Pompeii. Amongst the many film and theatrical works based on Bulwer-Lytton's novel was Errico Petrella's opera Jone, ossia L'ultimo giorno di Pompei, which premiered in 1858 and remained in the repertory both in Italy and internationally until well into the 20th century.

== Roles ==
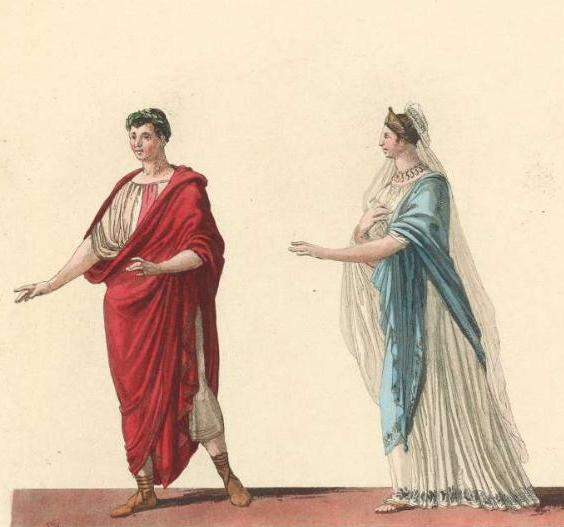
Costumes for Sallustio and Ottavia (La Scala production, 1827)

Roles, voice types, premiere cast
Role	Voice type	Premiere cast, 19 November 1825 Conductor: Nicola Festa
Sallustio, First Magistrate of Pompeii	bass	Luigi Lablache
Ottavia, his wife	soprano	Adelaide Tosi
Menenio, their son	soprano	Eloisa Manzocchi
Appio Diomede, a tribune	tenor	Giovanni David
Pubblio, custodian of the public baths	tenor	Giuseppe Ciccimarra
Clodio, son of Pubblio	soprano	Almerinda Manzocchi
Gran sacerdote, High Priest of the Temple of Jupiter	bass	Michele Benedetti
Fausto, freed slave of Sallustio	tenor	Gaetano Chizzola
Vestals, priests, augurs, Ottavia's handmaidens, magistrates, soldiers, guardians, servants, patricians, common people, dancers

== Synopsis ==
Place: Pompeii
Time:, 79 AD

=== Act 1 ===
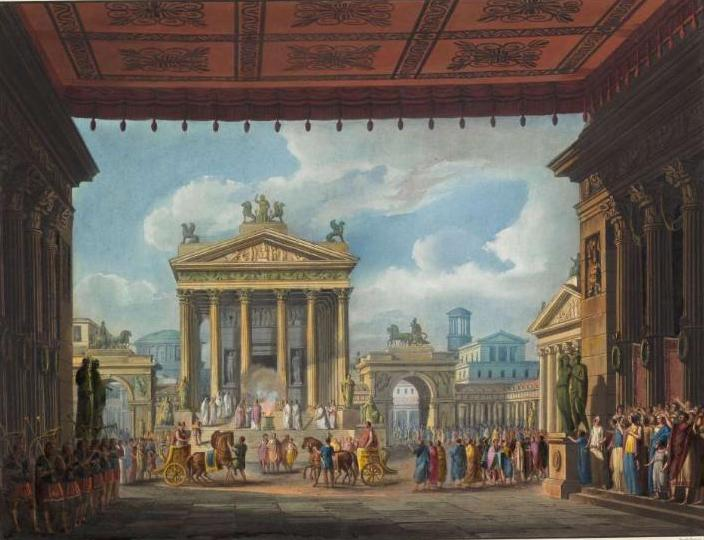
Set for act 1, scene 6, depicting the forum of Pompeii with the Temple of Jupiter in the background (La Scala production, 1827)

Sallustio has been elected First Magistrate of Pompeii. In the atrium of his house, he receives congratulations from all, including the tribune, Appio Diomede. However, Appio's congratulations are insincere. He is in love with Sallustio's wife Ottavia and is consumed with jealousy at their happiness. He later approaches Ottavia when she is alone and declares his love to her. When she angrily spurns him, he vows revenge and concocts a plot with Pubblio, the custodian of the public baths, to dishonour Ottavia. Pubblio's young son Clodio is disguised as a girl, and with the help of Fausto, Sallustio's freed slave, he is slipped in amongst Ottavia's handmaidens. The celebration of Sallustio's elevation to the magistracy begins at the Temple of Jupiter where Sallustio swears to uphold the laws of Rome. The procession then moves towards the amphitheatre for more festivities. Along the way, Pubblio, feigning indignation, drags Clodio away from the handmaidens and reveals his disguise. To the consternation of all, Clodio declares that he has been seduced by Ottavia. Although incredulous, Sallustio must now adhere to the oath he has just sworn and bring his wife to trial.

=== Act 2 ===
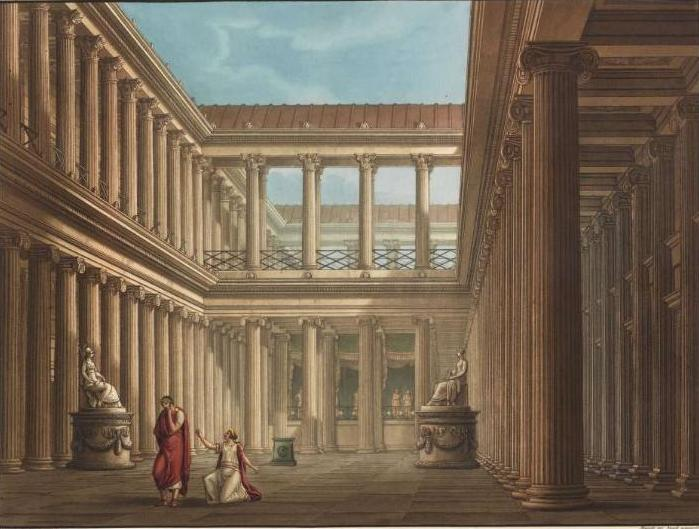
Set for act 2, scene 1, depicting the basilica of Pompeii (La Scala production, 1827)

At Ottavia's trial in the basilica of Pompeii, she protests her innocence. Although Appio, Pubblio, and Clodio's testimony is damning, Sallustio is still reluctant to find her guilty. At this point, ominous rumbling is heard from Mount Vesuvius, which is taken by the augurs as a sign that the gods are displeased with Sallustio's hesitation. Ottavia is thus condemned to be buried alive. As she is led into the tomb, accompanied by her faithful handmaidens, Ottavia turns to her husband one last time, swears her innocence, and entrusts their young son, Menenio, to his care. At this point, Vesuvius erupts with a tremendous explosion. Sallustio now takes this as a sign that a terrible injustice is about to be done and halts the execution. Pubblio, believing that his perfidy has brought disaster to Pompeii, confesses all and names Appio as the instigator of the plot. He and Appio are sealed in the tomb instead of Ottavia. As boulders and ash rain down on the city and all flee in panic, Menenio arrives with a chariot and rescues his parents. The eruption becomes ever stronger and the sky is filled with fire and lightning. The curtain falls on a scene of desolation.

== Recording ==
- Pacini: L'ultimo giorno di Pompei – Iano Tamar (Ottavia); Sonia Lee (Menenio); Raúl Giménez (Appio Diomede); Nicolas Rivenq (Sallustio); Gregory Bonfatti (Pubblio ); Riccardo Novaro (Gran Sacerdote); Svetlana Sidorova (Clodio); Emil Alekperov (Fausto); Bratislava Chamber Choir; Orchestra of the Teatro Massimo Bellini; Giuliano Carella (conductor). Recorded live at Martina Franca, 2–4 August 1996. Label: Dynamic 729
