= The Last Day of Pompeii =

1830s painting by Karl Bryullov

- Artist: Karl Bryullov
- Year: 1830–1833
- Medium: Oil on canvas
- Dimensions: 456.5 cm × 651 cm (179.7 in × 256 in)
- Location: State Russian Museum, Saint Petersburg

The Last Day of Pompeii is a large history painting by Karl Bryullov produced in 1830–1833 on the subject of the eruption of Mount Vesuvius in AD 79. It is notable for its positioning between Neoclassicism, the predominant style in Russia at the time, and Romanticism as increasingly practised in France.

The painting was received to near universal acclaim and made Bryullov the first Russian painter to have an international reputation. In Russia, it was seen as proving that Russian art was as good as art practised in the rest of Europe. It inspired Edward Bulwer-Lytton's world-famous novel The Last Days of Pompeii. Critics in France and Russia both noted, however, that the perfection of the classically modelled bodies seemed to be out of keeping with their desperate plight and the overall theme of the painting, which was a Romantic one of the sublime power of nature to destroy man's creations.

== Background ==
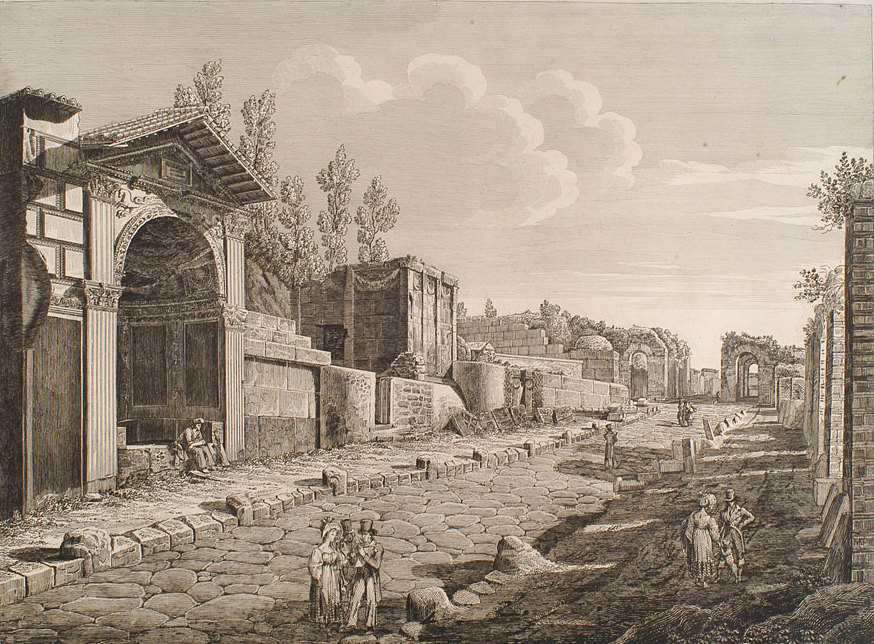
Luigi Rossini, Via dei Sepolcri in Pompei, engraving, Rome, 1830

The Roman city of Pompeii, south of Naples, was under active excavation in the early 19th century, work having begun on the city and its neighbour Herculaneum in the middle of the previous century. Artists were well aware of its potential as a subject. John Martin had painted The Destruction of Pompeii and Herculaneum in 1822 and others had sketched and produced engravings of the site.

In 1823, Bryullov arrived in Rome with his brother Aleksandr via Venice and Florence. Aleksandr was a participant in a scientific study and restoration of the Pompeii baths in 1825–26, which led to the publication of his book Thermes de Pompéi in Paris in 1829, and Karl may have visited Pompeii in 1824. He saw Alessandro Sanquirico's set designs for Giovanni Pacini's opera L'ultimo giorno di Pompei (1825), which was performed at Naples and at La Scala, Milan, and visited the Naples museum to study artefacts recovered from Pompeii. He certainly visited Pompeii in 1827 and according to Rosalind Blakesley, was so affected by the remains of the Via dei Sepolcri (Street of the Tombs) that he decided to set his painting in that street. Contemporary letters indicate that he studied Pliny the Younger's eye-witness description of the disaster, in which Pliny's uncle died, and Pliny's observations in his letters to Tacitus were referenced in the picture. Also in literature, Bryullov read Alessandro Manzoni's novel I promessi sposi (The Betrothed, 1827) with its historically based account of a disastrous plague and the reactions to it of individuals.

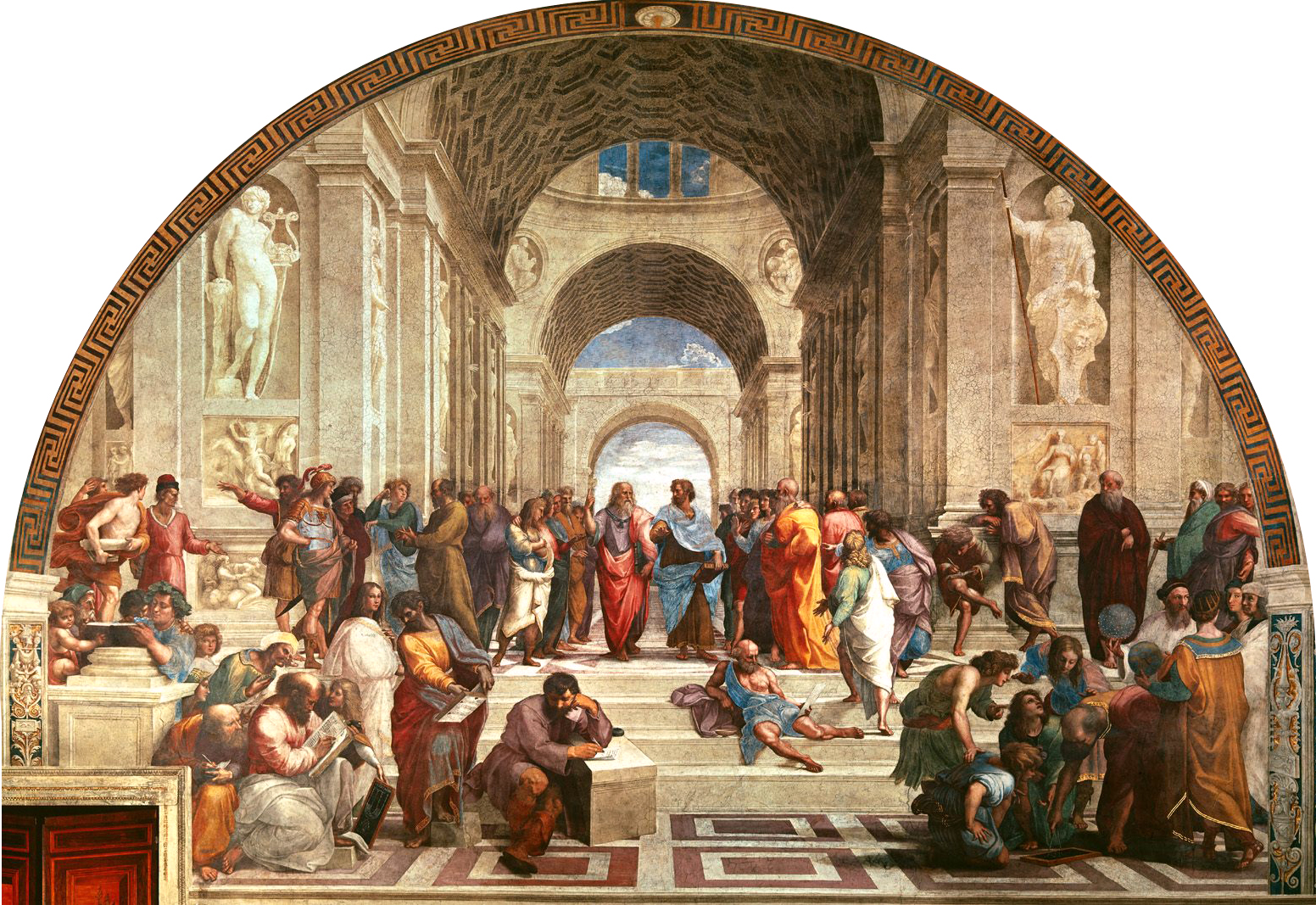
Raphael, The School of Athens, fresco, 1509–1511, Apostolic Palace, Vatican City. An example for Bryullov of what could be achieved in history painting

These sources coalesced into the work known as The Last Day of Pompeii for which Bryullov painted a compositional sketch in 1828 at the request of Countess Maria Razumovskaya. The main canvas was commissioned by Count Anatoly Demidov, whom Bryullov had met in Naples, and for whom he painted an equestrian portrait the same year. It was to be completed by 1830 for the sum of 40,000 francs, but by the end of that year Bryullov had only got as far as outlining the figures on the canvas in two colours and had given little attention to colour choices. A trip to Bologna and Venice to see work by Tintoretto and Titian gave him the answers he needed.

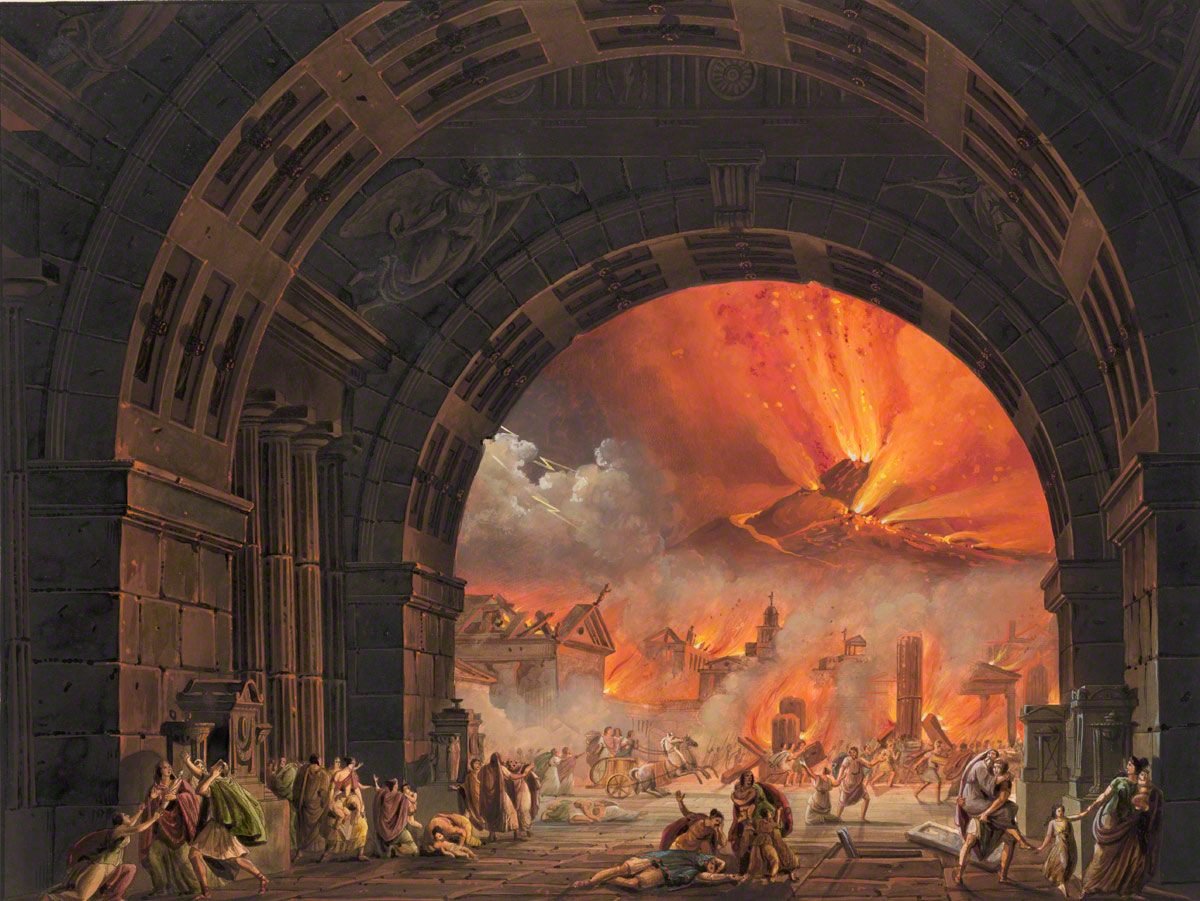
Alessandro Sanquirico's set design for the eruption of Mount Vesuvius in Pacini's opera L'ultimo giorno di Pompei, 1827, La Scala production

== Subject and composition ==
The subject is the eruption of Mount Vesuvius in AD 79 that enveloped the city of Pompeii in volcanic ash, killing most of its inhabitants. As a scene from the ancient world it was an appropriate subject for a history painting, then regarded as the highest genre of painting, and the magnitude of the event also made it suitable for a large canvas that would allow Bryullov to showcase all his skills.

Bryullov said that he could only have completed the work with the example of Raphael's large and complex work The School of Athens (1509–1511) as his model, and he used classical forms recognisable as those used by the Renaissance masters, but combined them with features found in Romantic painting, such as dramatic colouring, the use of chiaroscuro, and a high emotional content. Other works thought to have influenced Bryullov are Raphael's The Fire in the Borgo (1514–17) and Nicolas Poussin's The Plague at Ashdod (1630).

He eschewed the coolness and flatness of the then-prevalent Neoclassicism in favour of excitement and vibrant colour, combined with a deep recession as a horse bolts into the depths of the painting, unseating its master. Nikolai Gogol commented: "His colouring is possibly brighter than it has ever been; his paints burn and hit you in the eye", but he was not the only one to note that the perfection of the classical figures contrasted with the wretchedness of their predicament.

Bryullov filled the canvas with authentic detail from Pompeii that he had seen at the site and in the museum at Naples such as the artefacts carried by the figures and the authentic paving and kerb stones. Statues toppling from their pedestals bring additional drama and demonstrate the sublime power of nature over man, a common trope in Romantic painting. The figures provide small vignettes of individual experience that reference stories from classical mythology, renaissance painting or ancient literature such as Pliny the Younger's account given to Tacitus, but most of the characters preserve their dignity in the face of death indicating Bryullov's great debt to the principals of Classicism. Poses and figures are drawn from classical painting or from people the artist knew such as Yuliya Samoylova and her daughters. The soldier and boy rescuing an older man may derive from the story of Aeneas's rescue of his father from the destruction of Troy in mythology. To the scene is added an image of the artist himself as a Pompeian artist with his equipment balanced on his head.

== Reception ==
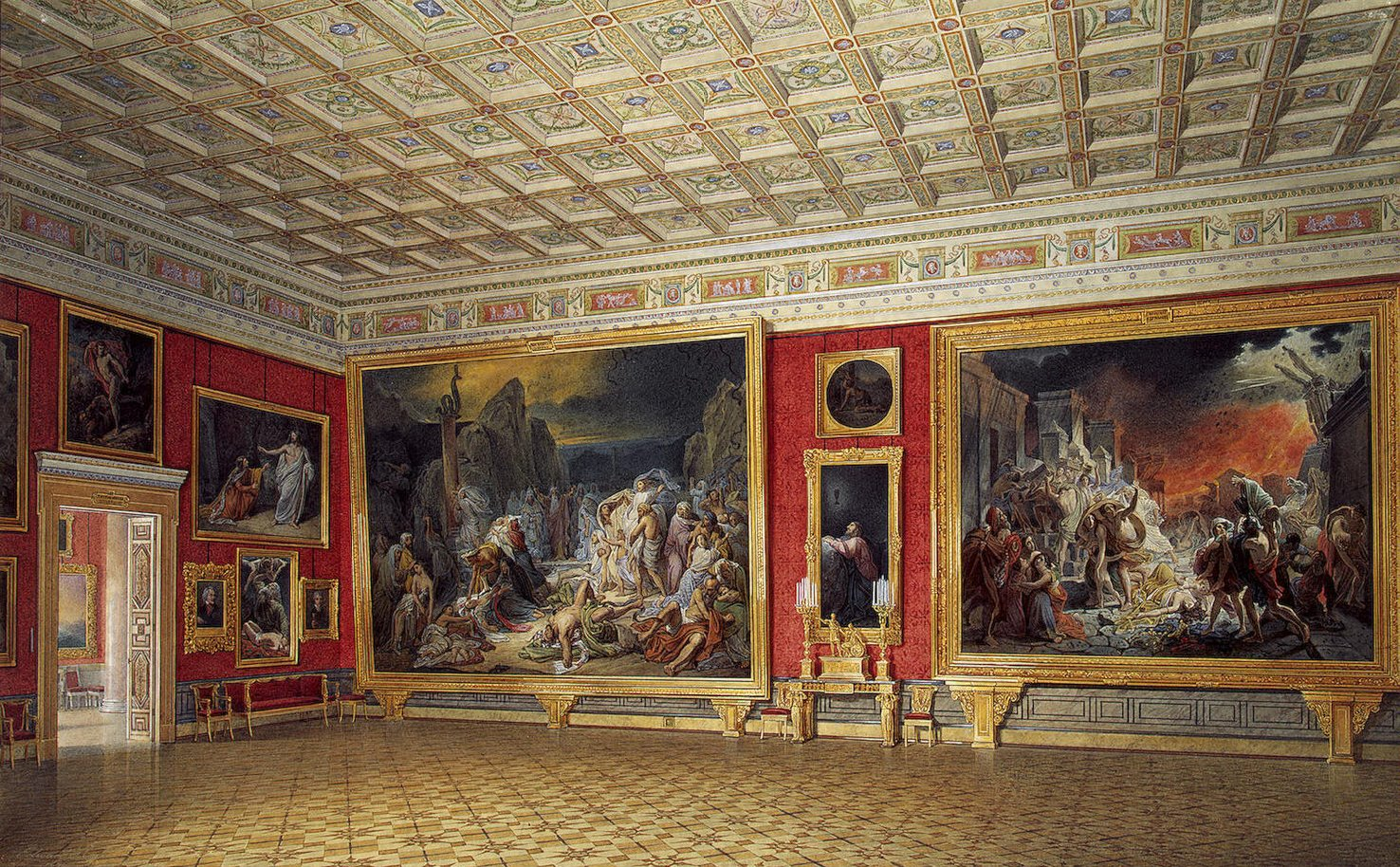
The Last Day of Pompeii alongside Brazen Serpent (1840) by Feodor Bruni at the New Hermitage in 1856 in a watercolour by Edward P. Hau

The painting took so long to finish that Demidov threatened to cancel its commission, but when it was first shown at Bryullov's studio in Italy on Via San Claudio in Rome, it received a rapturous response. Sir Walter Scott is said to have studied the painting for an hour before declaring that it was not an ordinary painting, but an epic and Vincenzo Camuccini described it as a "flaming colossus". The Italian archaeologist Pietro Ercole Visconti wrote an article praising the painter and the painting. The Uffizi requested a self-portrait of the artist. In Milan, Bryullov was given a standing ovation in a theatre and carried through the city's streets wearing a garland of flowers. It was seen there by Edward Bulwer-Lytton whose novel The Last Days of Pompeii was published in 1834. In Bologna, gallery officials removed Raphael's St Cecilia from the walls and placed it in a private room when Bryullov asked to copy it.

The reception was slightly cooler when it was displayed at the Paris Salon of 1834. It still won a gold medal, but some critics saw it as slightly outdated compared to Eugène Delacroix's Femmes d'Alger dans leur Appartement (1834), which was exhibited alongside it, the high emotional content leading one critic to comment in L'Artiste, "l'impression est moins voisine de la terreur que du ridicule" (the impression is less akin to terror than ridicule). Rosalind Blakesley attributes this slightly behind-the-times feel to the isolation of contemporary Russian art teaching from the latest French developments since the start of the nineteenth century and the tensions inherent in the work between neo-classicism and romanticism.

It was the first Russian artwork to cause such an interest abroad, making Bryullov the first Russian painter to gain an international reputation. Five foreign academies made him an honorary member and the quantity of positive reviews and critical comment was such that the Society for the Encouragement of Artists published a volume of them in Russian translation.

When the painting arrived in Russia in August 1834, it was received with as much enthusiasm as it had been in Italy, according to Gogol as much by those with a refined taste as those who were ignorant of art. Bryullov was made an honorary free associate of the academy and awarded the Order of St Anne, third class. He was made a professor at the academy in Saint Petersburg and placed in charge of history painting. He met the Tsar. Ivan Turgenev described the painting as "the glory of Russia and Italy" and it inspired Alexander Pushkin to write a poem about the destruction of Pompeii. Russians saw the painting as elevating the status of Russian art in Europe generally and in turn it elevated the status of painters in Russia. Gogol opined that it was a "bright resurrection of painting, which has been for too long in some sort of semi-lethargic state", but was not alone in seeing a parallel between Pompeii and contemporary Saint Petersburg and the painting as a forecast of divine retribution for the modern city's decadent Western ways. The dissident Alexander Herzen, meanwhile, saw it as an allegory about the collapse of European monarchies or the tyrannical power of the Russian state over the individual.

After his great success with The Last Day of Pompeii, Bryullov was expected to produce similar large works of history, but most of his attempts remained unfinished and he was criticised for his Death of Ines de Castro, which was completed in only 17 days in 1834. Instead he found success in portraits of the Russian elite including the royal family.

== Ownership ==
In 1834, Demidov presented the painting, for which he had paid 25,000 rubles, to Tsar Nicholas in an attempt to win his favour. It was at first exhibited in the Winter Palace, but in 1836 Nicholas donated it to the Imperial Academy of Arts where it remained until it was installed as the centre of the Russian painting display at the New Hermitage in 1851. It is currently part of the collection of the State Russian Museum in Saint Petersburg.

== Gallery ==
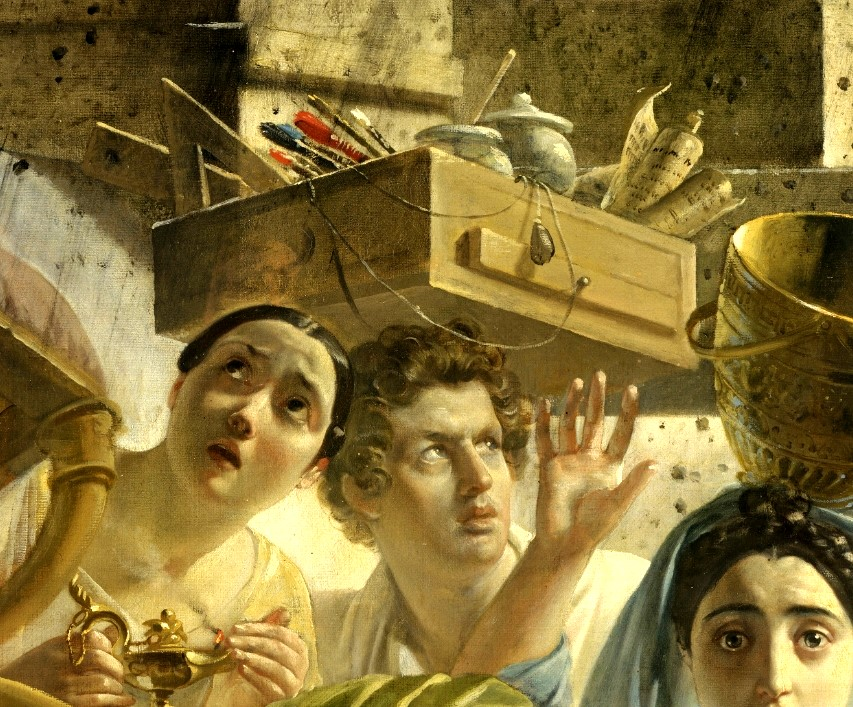
The artist and his paintbox.

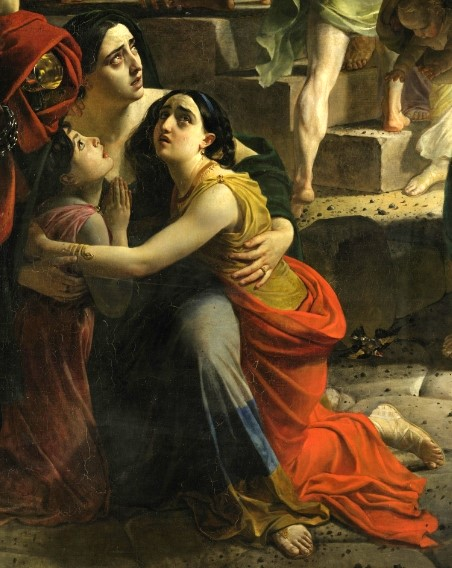
It is thought that Countess Yuliya Samoylova and her daughters Giovannina and Amazilia were the models for these figures.

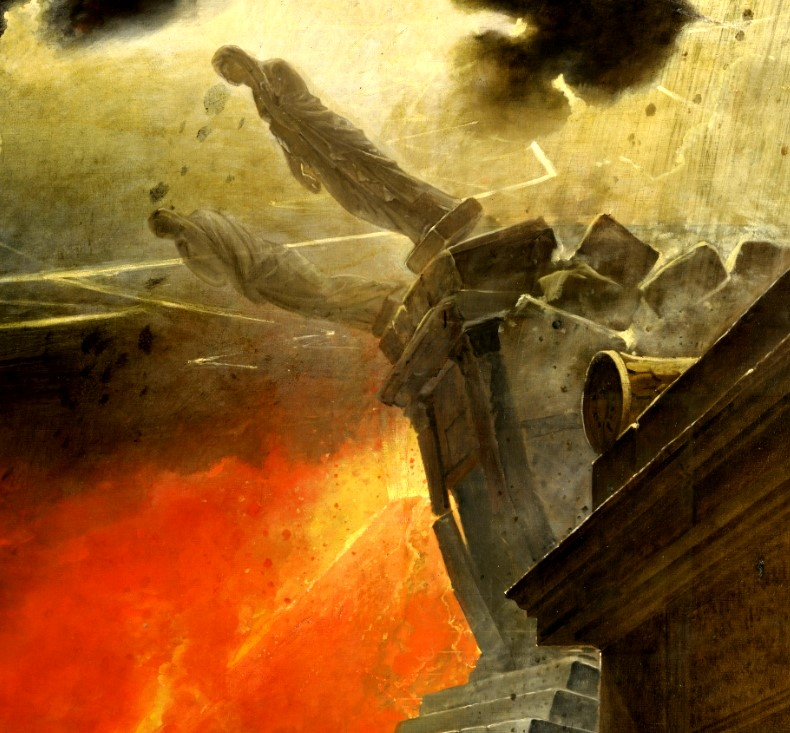
Statues topple from their pedestals showing the sublime power of nature over man.

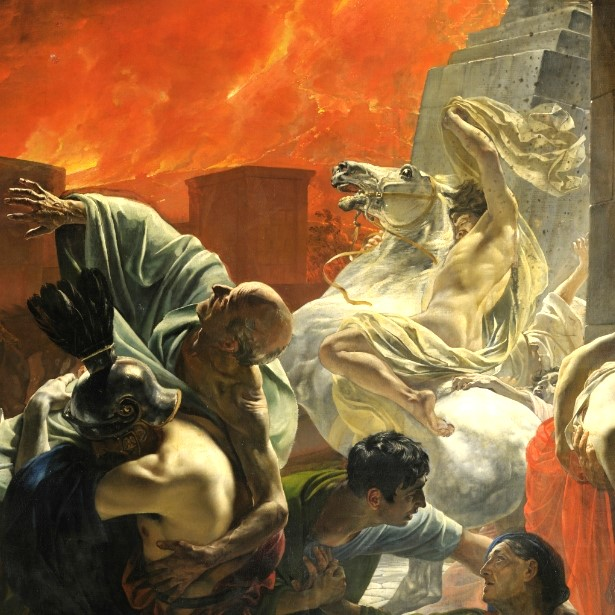
The classically modelled bodies of the horseman and the soldier are combined with Romantic depictions of the terror that may be created by the forces of nature in the figures of the old man and the horse.

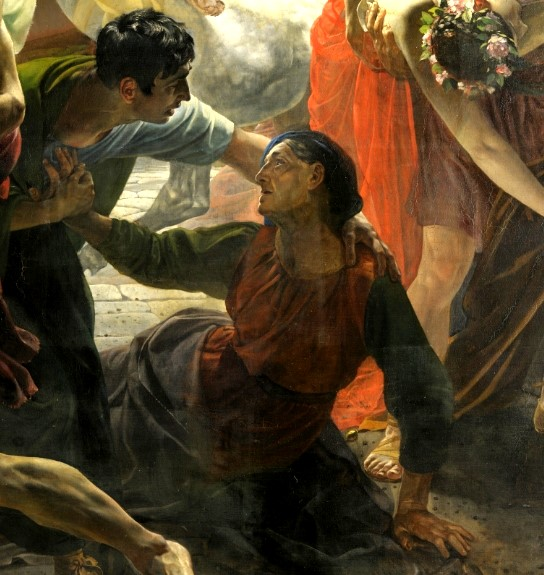
A mother implores her son to flee as Pliny's mother had urged him to do.

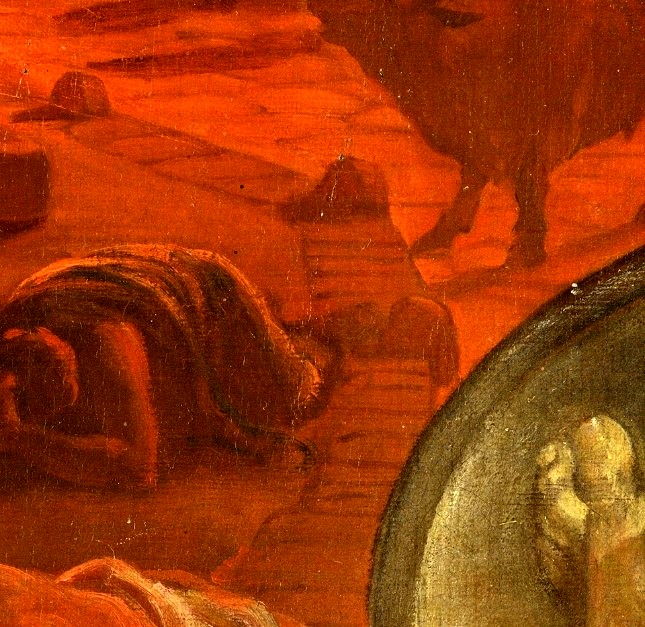
Stone work and pavements similar to those at Pompeii.

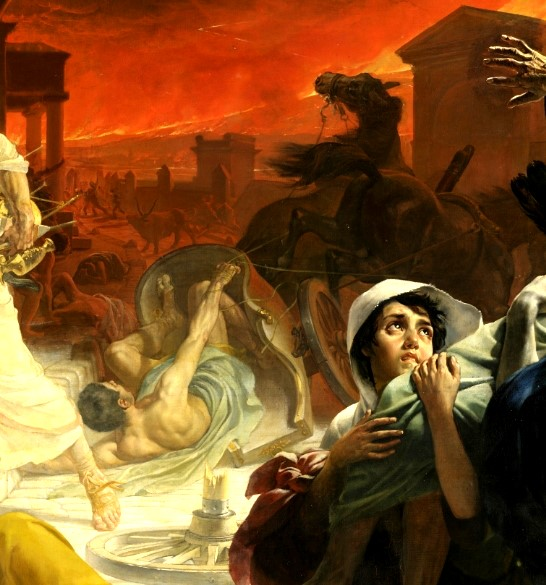
The bolting horse and broken chariot lead the viewer deep into the painting where more chaos is occurring.
