= Yulia Samoylova (countess) =

Russian noble (1803–1875)

Yulia Pavlovna Samoylova
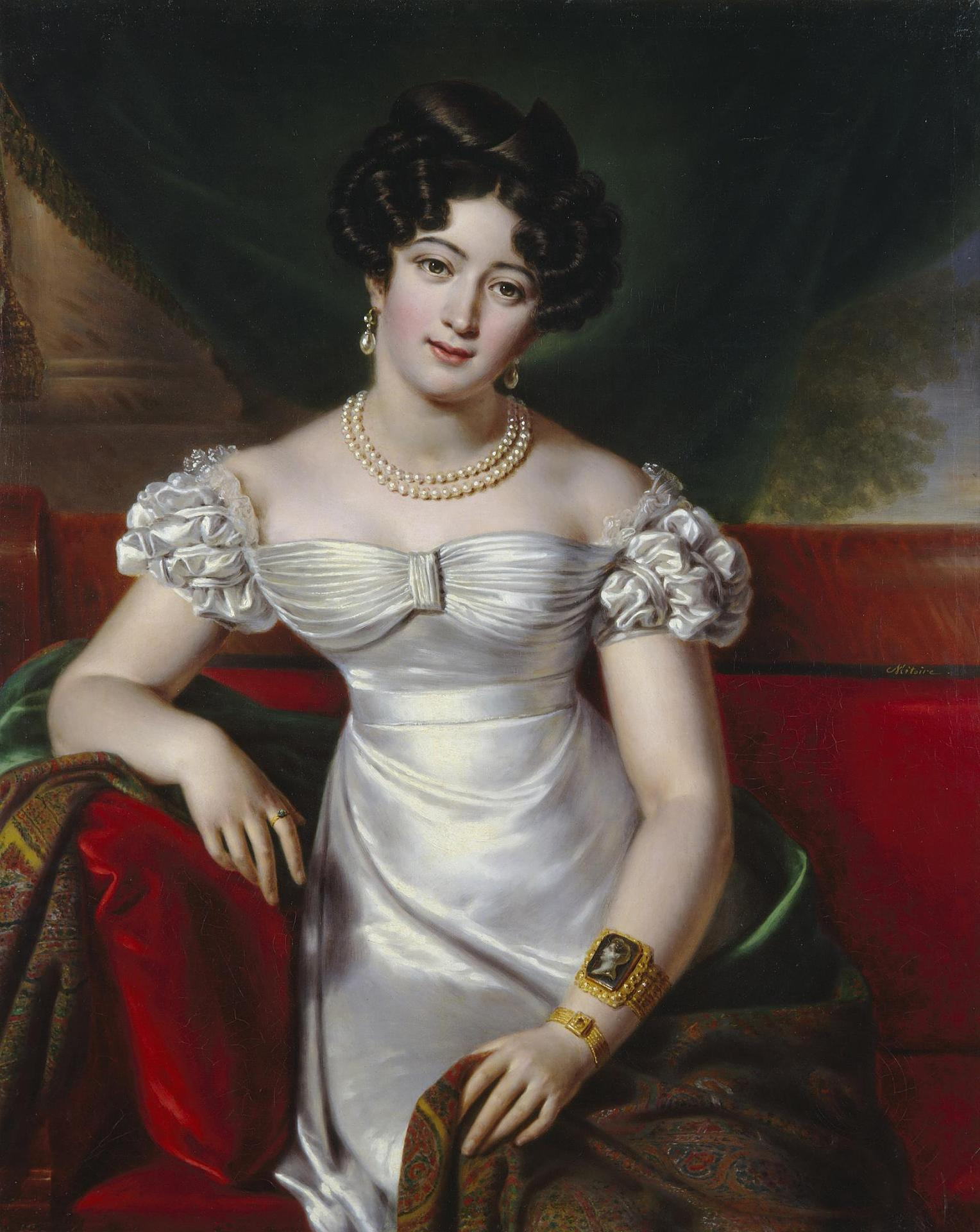
- Portrait by Benoît-Charles Mithouard (1825)
- Born: 1803
- Died: 14 March 1875 (aged 71–72); Paris, France
- Buried: Père Lachaise Cemetery, France
- Spouses: Count Nikolai Alexandrovich Samoilov; Giovanni Peri; Charles de Mornay
- Father: Count Pavel Petrovich von der Pahlen
- Mother: Maria Skavronskaya

Countess Yulia Pavlovna Samoylova (Russian: Графиня Юлия Павловна Самойлова, Grafinya Yuliya Pavlovna Samoylova, née Yulia von der Pahlen; 1801 or 1803 — 14 March 1875) was a granddaughter of Count Martyn Skavronskiy and the last scion of Skavronskiy family. Samoylova had strong affiliations with Karl Briullov, whose The Last Day of Pompeii among others shows the idealized figures of himself and Samoylova.

== Early Life ==
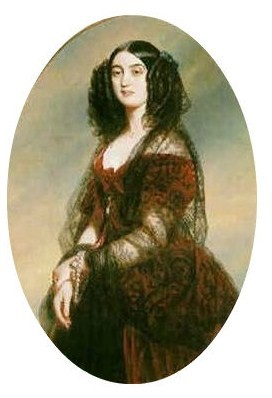
Countess Samoylova by Franz Xaver Winterhalter c. 1840s

=== Childhood ===
Yulia Pavlovna was born to Count Pavel von der Pahlen and Maria Skavronskaya. The couple lived a nomadic life, as the count was the commander of Izyum Hussar Regiment. Her mother gave birth to her in a peasant hut, but accustomed to the luxuries of Saint Petersburg, soon grew tired and divorced the count the following year. And alternative theory poses that Yulia was not the daughter of Pavel, but the daughter of her mother's step-father Count Litta, the revelation of which was the reason for the couple's divorce.

Maria returned to the home of her mother, Yekaterina von Engelhardt, and her step-father Count Giulio Renato Litta. Count Pahlen would later remarry twice, providing Yulia with a brother (Nikolai) and four sisters (Elizaveta, Ekaterina, Olga, and Elena). Maria Skavronskaya married Count Adam Petrovich Ozharovsky in early 1807 and would relocate to Paris to study music. Yulia was thus raised by her gradmother and her husband, who grew quite attached to her.

=== First Marriage ===
While serving as a maid of honour at court, Yulia Pavlovna married the 24-year-old, Count Nikolai Alexandrovich Samoilov on 25 January 1825. Samoilov was an aide-de-camp to the emperor, as well as the second cousin once removed of Yulia. His mother, Countess Ekaterina Samoilova, arranged the match. She insisted her son marry the wealthy Countess Yulia von der Pahlen. Samoilov, however, was in love with another woman, Alexandra Rimskaya-Korsakova, who would later become a favourite of Alexander Pushkin. Ekaterina Samoilova would not agree to this marriage, and her son eventually married the bride of her choosing.

The wedding took place in Kazan Cathedral with the blessing of the emperor and the Dowager Empress Maria Feodorovna. The marriage would turn out to be an unhappy one. Count Samoilov had a penchant for carousing and gambling, and Yulia Pavlovna is said to have engaged in an affair. The couple turned could towards eachother, and their heated arguments became the subject of endless gossip.

In 1827, the couple amicably separated. Samoilov maintained a very friendly relationshup with Yulia and returned her dowry. Contemporaries blamed Yulia for the incident. some said it was her affair with the French ambassador, Auguste, comte de La Ferronays, or with Barante Jr.. Alexander Turgenev recalled it differently:

"Count Litta had a clerk named Mishkovsky, a cross between a Jew and a Little Russian. Mishkovsky was entrusted by Count Lita to Count and Countess Samoilov for clerical duties and office management. Mr. Mishkovsky managed to gain the young Count Samoilov's trust, become his companion in carousing, and simultaneously gain the particularly favorable favor of Count Samoilov's young wife. This favor with Mishkovsky resulted in her divorce from her husband; she departed for foreign lands, and Mishkovsky received from the Countess a loan of 800,000 rubles or more for his efforts. Grandfather Count Litta, loving his granddaughter after his wife and loving money even more, began to refute the loan of money and persecute Mishkovsky."

The scandal was serious. For a time Countess Ekaterina Litta even refused to receive her granddaughter. Yulia attempted to mend her relationship with her husband, but was not successful.

== Independent Life ==
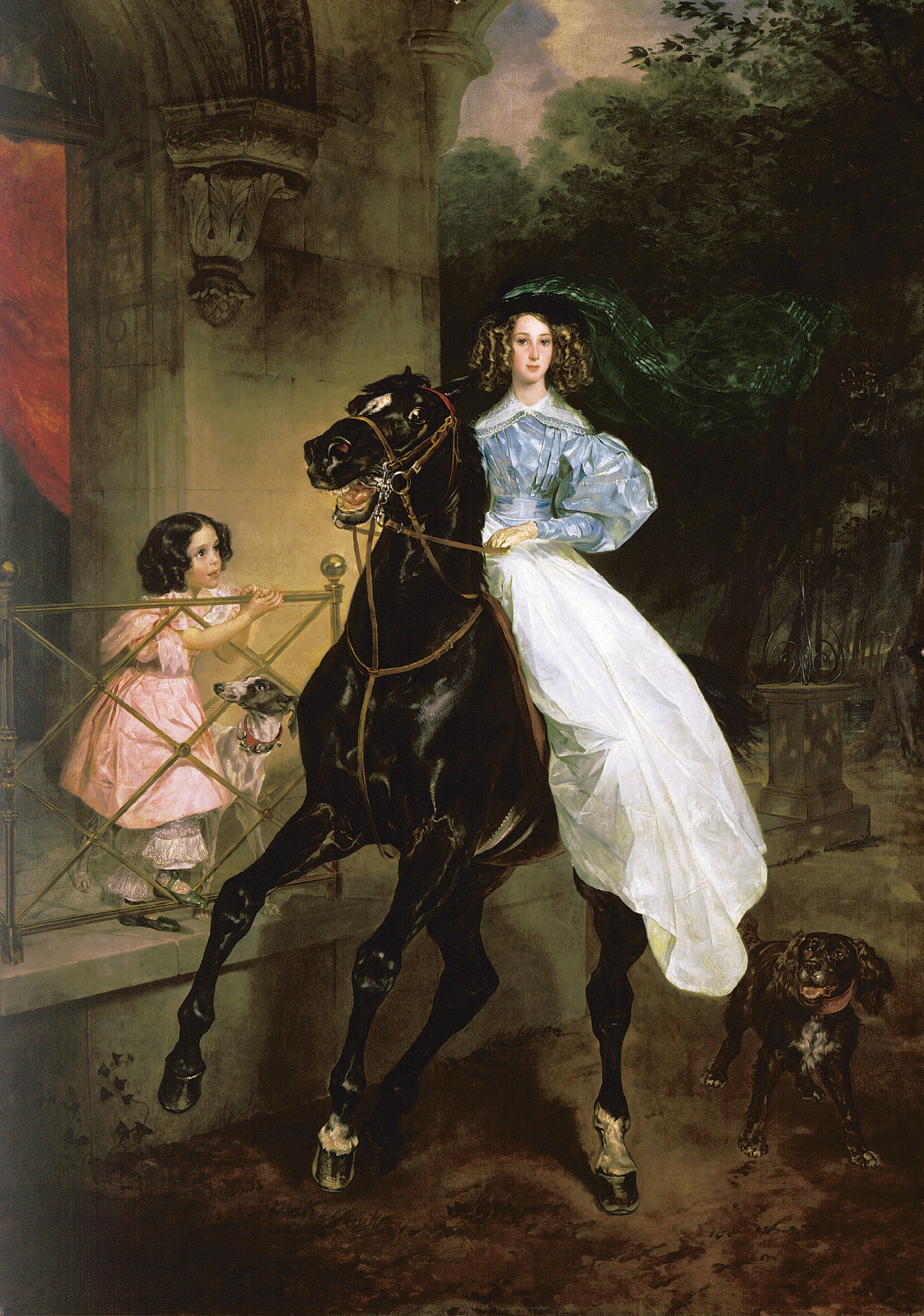
Horsewoman. Portrait of Giovannina and Amacilia Pacini, the Foster Children of Countess Yu. P. Samoilova

After the separation from her husband, Yulia left Russia for Milan, there she entered Italian high society. She patronised artists and musicians, actively participating in the cultural scene. Among her frequent guests were Vincenzo Bellini, Gaetano Donizetti, Gioachino Rossini, and Giovanni Pacini. It is believed that Samoilova paid the Claquers for the failure of Bellini's opera Norma and for the success of pacini's opera Il corsaro.

In Rome, at the salon of Zinaida Volkonskaya or at the home of Russian envoy Grigori Gagarin, Yulia Pavlovna met Karl Bryullov. Through Yulia, Bryullov was introduced to people from high society. He painted Yulia often and the pair formed a strong friendship. Though according to Grand Duke Nicholas Mikhailovich, his feeling went deeper.

In 1829, Countess Ekaterina Litt died. Samoylova spent her inheritance on her family estate, Grafskaya Slavyanka, near St. Petersburg. She decided to rebuild the property in the modern style and turned to the famous architect, watercolourist, and brother of her dear friend, Alexander Brullov. In the Summer of 1831, Alexander Brullov began work on the estate. He would later also build her a palace on Yelagin Island.

Yulia maintained a cheerful and relaxed atmosphere at Slavyanka, poetry and music were heard, guests discussed and argued on all sorts of topics. Her extravagant lifestyle shocked St. Petersburg society. Olga Pavlishcheva wrote to her husband:

"Did Countess Samoylova ever pass through Warsaw? Did she perform her tricks, like sitting on the driver's seat with a pipe in her mouth and a man's hat on her curled and disheveled head? She's quite amusing and, I thinkm a little crazy."

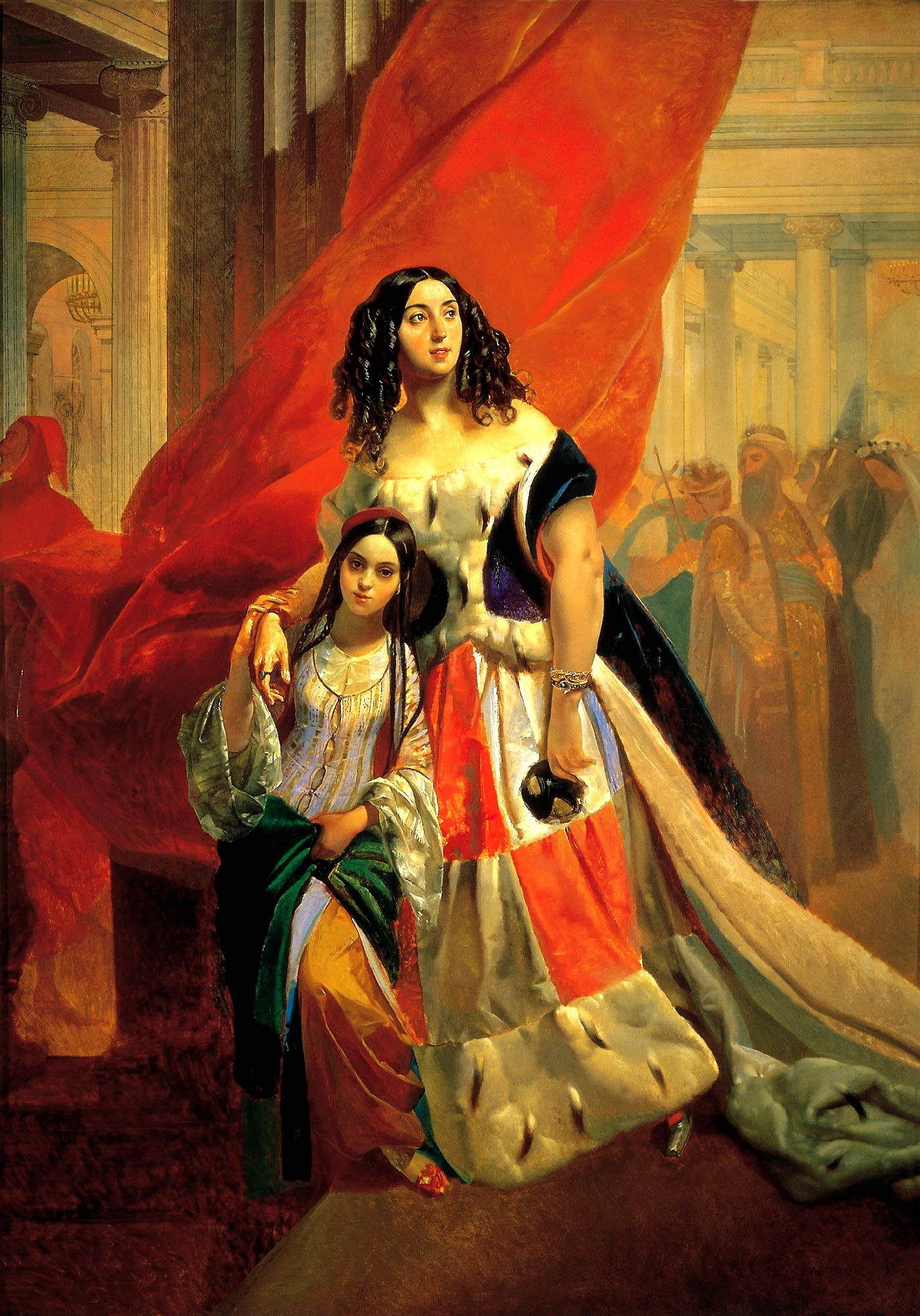
Countess Yulia Samoylova with her adopted daughter Amazilia Paccini by Karl Bryullov.

In another letter, dated September 1835, Pavlishcheva described a celebration organised for the amusement of the cavalry guards by Yulia Samoylova:

'Recently she decided to organise a village festival in her village of Slavyanka, similar to the one at Paul de Kock's White House. They set up a pole with prizes - a sarafan and headdress hung from it. Imagine, the prize went to a 45-year-old woman, fat and ugly! This greatly entertained the Countess, as you can imagine, and everyone around her, but the heroine's husband beat her and threw everything into the fire. Then the Countess ordered another one and ordered her to wear it as a reward fpr her dexterity. They say that the officers who showed up to this festival without permission were arrested the next day. Countess Samoylova is feeling well and very cheerful. She has a young Italian woman living with her, to whom she gives a million - she is only fourteen years old."

The noisy gatherings Slavyanka began to irritate the emperor. Countess Samoylova was made aware of this, and Nicholas I permitted her to leave, on the condition that she did not appear in either Moscow or St. Petersburg. Yulia left again for Italy.

The death of count Litta in 1839 forced her to return to St. Petersburg for a time, in order to claim her inheritance, the palaces and villas belionging to the Visconti and Litta families. During this visit, she met Karl Bryullov gain, who had been recalled to Russia on order of the Emperor, to take up a professorship at the St. Petersburg Academy of the Arts. In 1839, the artist married Emilia Timm, but they divorced two months later. The divorce provoked public disconsent, and Yulia Pavlovna took the disgraced Bryullov under her wing.

At the same time, Yulia's friends and family attempted to reconcile her with her husband, but on 23 July, 1842, a few days before their intented meeting, Nikolai Samoylov died unexpectedly.

After her husband's death, Countess Samoylova left Russia for good and settled in Italy. Bryullov followed her there. He spent long periods of time with the Countess at her villa in Lombardy. Yuia also owned an estate in Grousset, France, a palazzo in Milan, and a palace on Lake Como.

Yulia Pavlovna Samoylova adopted two daughters, Giovanina (born c.1824) and Amacilia Pacini (born 1828), daughters of the composer Giovanni Pacini. It is unknown when Samoilova to Amacilia into her care, but the painting Horsewoman by Bryllov indicates she was living with Yulia by atleast four years of age.

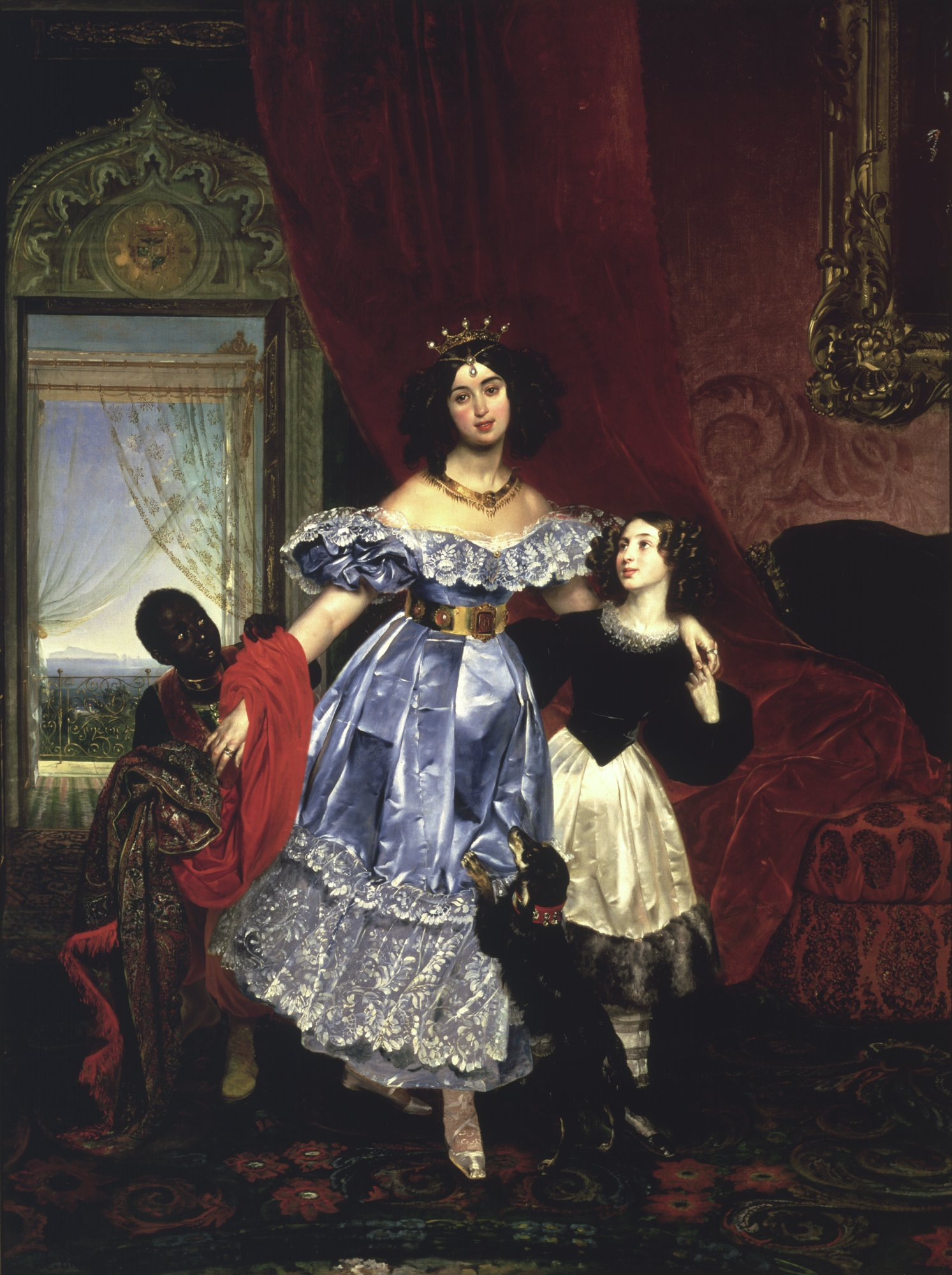
Countess Samoilova with Giovanina Pacini by Karl Bryullov.

== Later Years ==
In 1846, Yulia Pavlovna married the young tenor Giovanni Peri, a man of extrodinaty beauty. Upon marrying an Italian, Yulia lost her Russian citizenship and sold her Russian properties. However, the happiness was short-lived. Peri died that same year in Venice of tuberculosis. His body was transported to paris and buried in Père Lachaise Cemetery. Valentin Pikul wrote on Yulia's widowhood:

"Eyewitnesses who saw her during this period of her life recounted that widow's mourning suited her very well, highlighting her beauty, but she used it in a most original way. Samoylova would seat children on the long train of her mourning dress, as if on a cart, and she herself, like a healthy horse, would wheel the delighted, laughing children across the mirrored parquet floors of her palaces."

The loss of her title of countess greatly distresses Yulia Pavlovna. Living on the Grousset estate near Paris, and with ample means at her disposal, she remarried in 1863 to the bankrupt French count and diplomat, Charles de Mornay when she was 60, and he was 66. Almost immediately after the wedding, the couple separated. After receiving her husband's title, Yulia paid a huge annual allowance which negatively impacted her finances. By the end of her life, she had lost almost everything.

Yulia Pavlovna died of chest inflammation on 14 march 1875, Paris. According to her will, she was buried with her second husband in the Père Lachaise Cemetery.
