= List of mass panic cases =

In sociology and psychology, mass hysteria is a social phenomenon where collective illusions of threats, whether real or imaginary, are transmitted through a population and society as a result of rumors and fear. In medicine, the term is used to describe the spontaneous manifestation—or production of chemicals in the body—of the same or similar hysterical physical symptoms by more than one person.

A common type of mass hysteria occurs when a group of people believes that they have a similar disease or ailment, sometimes referred to as mass sociogenic illness or epidemic hysteria.

== Middle Ages ==
- According to an account which was written by an author in 1784, a nun who lived in a German convent in the 15th century began to bite her companions, and the behavior soon spread through other convents in Germany, Holland and Italy.
- In The Epidemics of the Middle Ages, an 1844 collection of works written by J. F. C. Hecker (and translated by Benjamin Guy Babington), a translator's note by Babington, citing an unnamed medical textbook, recalls the story of a nun who lived in a French convent during an unspecified time (presumably in the Middle Ages) who inexplicably began to meow like a cat, shortly leading the other nuns in the convent to meow as well. Eventually, all of the nuns in the convent would meow together for a certain period, leaving the surrounding community astonished. This did not stop until the police threatened to whip the nuns.

== 1500–1800 ==
- Witch trials in the early modern period from 1450 to 1750 and especially from 1580 to 1630.
- Dancing plague of 1518 – a case of dancing mania that occurred in Strasbourg, Alsace (then part of the Holy Roman Empire) in July 1518 wherein numerous people took to dancing for days.
- Irish Fright (1688) – In England and parts of Wales in December 1688 during the Glorious Revolution, false reports that Irish soldiers were burning and massacring English towns prompted a mass panic in at least 19 counties, with thousands of people arming themselves and preparing to resist non-existent groups of marauding Irishmen.
- Salem witch trials (1692−1693) – In colonial Massachusetts, adolescent girls Abigail Williams, Betty Parris, Ann Putnam Jr., and Elizabeth Hubbard began to have fits that were described by a minister as "beyond the power of epileptic fits or natural disease to effect." The events resulted in the Salem witch trials, a series of hearings which resulted in the execution of 20 citizens and the death of five other citizens of Salem Village, Massachusetts (present day Danvers, Massachusetts) and nearby towns who were accused of practicing witchcraft. The episode is one of America's most notorious cases of mass hysteria, and it has been used in political rhetoric and popular literature as a vivid cautionary tale about the dangers of isolationism, religious extremism, false accusations and lapses in due process.
- Würzburg, Germany (1749) – an outbreak of screaming, squirming, and trance in a nunnery led to the execution of a suspected witch.
- Glass harmonica (1761-1820)
- Chinese sorcery scares, a series of similar events that took place in 1768, 1810, 1876, and 1910.
- Great Fear (1789) – a general panic that took place between 17 July and 3 August 1789, at the start of the French Revolution.

== 1800–1950 ==
- Hammersmith Ghost hysteria (1803) – In November 1803, stories of ghost sightings in the Hammersmith neighbourhood of west London began to circulate. Many people assumed the ghost to be that of a recent suicide victim buried in Hammersmith's churchyard, which was in accordance with a popular notion at the time that suicides should not be buried in sacred grounds because their souls would be unable to find rest there. All witnesses reported the ghost as being very tall and clothed entirely in white, with some adding horns and glass eyes to the mix. As more individuals came forward to claim that they had not only seen the Hammersmith ghost, but had also been assaulted by it, alarm rapidly turned to widespread panic, and finally mass hysteria. Fearful residents responded by taking up guns and monitoring the area. This reaction resulted in one member of the public, Francis Smith, shooting and killing bricklayer Thomas Millwood by mistake, thinking he was the ghost.
- Spring-heeled Jack sightings (1837-1904) – The earliest known sightings of Spring-heeled Jack, a legendary figure in English folklore, are claimed to have occurred in London in 1837, and the final confirmed sighting is said to have taken place in Liverpool in 1904.
- "Writing Tremor Epidemic" (1892, 1904) – The right hand of a 10-year-old girl in Groß Tinz began trembling, which developed into full-body seizures that spread to 19 other students. A similar epidemic affected 20 in Basel, Switzerland. Twelve years later, the Basel school experienced another outbreak that affected 27 students. Legend of the first outbreak was said to have played a role.
- Montreal (1894) – 60 students at a ladies' seminary had an outbreak of fits and seizures, some for as long as 2 months.
- "Trembling Disease" (1905–06) – An estimated 237 children were impacted between October 1905 and May 1906 in Meissen, Germany.
- Miracle of the Sun (disputed) (13 October 1917) – The Miracle of the Sun, also known as the Miracle of Fátima, was a series of events reported to have occurred miraculously, witnessed by a large crowd who had gathered in Fátima, Portugal, in response to a prophecy made by three children. Newspapers published testimony from witnesses who said that they had seen extraordinary solar activity. Skeptical analysts attribute the claims to the "psychological suggestibility of the witnesses".
- Halifax Slasher (1938) – The "Halifax Slasher" was the name given to a supposed attacker of residents, mostly women, of the town of Halifax, England, in November 1938. The week-long scare began after two women claimed to have been attacked by a mysterious man with a mallet and "bright buckles" on his shoes. Further reports of attacks by a man wielding a knife or a razor followed. The situation became so serious that Scotland Yard was called in to assist the Halifax police. On November 29 one of the alleged victims admitted that he had inflicted the damage upon himself for attention. Others soon had similar admissions, and the Yard investigation concluded that none of the attacks had been real. Five local people were subsequently charged with public mischief offenses, and four were sent to prison.
- "War of the Worlds" radio broadcast (1938) – Newspaper headlines reported that thousands of Americans were plunged into panic over an Orson Welles radio play, convinced that America was under a deadly Martian attack.
- Bellevue, Louisiana (1939) – A girl developed a leg twitch at the annual homecoming high school dance. Attacks worsened and spread to friends over the next several weeks.
- Mad Gasser of Mattoon (1940s) – Mattoon, Illinois
- Ghost rockets (1946) – German, British and Scandinavian intelligence officials concluded that the Ghost rockets which were reported over Scandinavia are a case of mass hysteria (among other conclusions).
- Tokyo sea monster broadcast (1947) – On May 29, 1947, the United States armed forces radio station in Tokyo (WVTR) broadcast a "news bulletin" that a 20-feet tall sea monster was spotted in Tokyo Bay and travelling inland.
- 1947 flying disc craze

== 1950−2000 ==
- Seattle windshield pitting epidemic (1954)
- Tanganyika laughter epidemic (1962) – began on January 30, 1962, at a mission-run boarding school for girls in Kashasha, Tanzania. The laughter started with three girls and spread haphazardly throughout the school, affecting 95 of the 159 pupils, aged 12–18. Symptoms lasted from a few hours to 16 days in those affected. The teaching staff were not affected but reported that students were unable to concentrate on their lessons. The school was forced to close down on March 18, 1962. After the school was closed and the students were sent home, the epidemic spread to Nshamba, a village that was home to several of the girls. In April and May, 217 people had laughing attacks in the village, most of them school children and young adults. The Kashasha school was reopened on May 21, only to be closed again at the end of June. In June, the laughing epidemic spread to Ramashenye girls' middle school, near Bukoba, affecting 48 girls. Another outbreak occurred in Kanyangereka and two nearby boys schools were closed.
- June bug epidemic (1962) – A mysterious disease broke out in a dressmaking department of an American textile factory. The symptoms included numbness, nausea, dizziness, and vomiting. Word of a bug in the factory that would bite its victims and cause them to develop the above symptoms quickly spread. Soon 62 employees developed this mysterious illness, some of whom were hospitalized. The news media reported on the case. After research by company physicians and experts from the US Public Health Service Communicable Disease Center, it was concluded that the case was one of mass hysteria. While the researchers believed some workers were bitten by the bug, anxiety was probably the cause of the symptoms. No evidence was ever found for a bug which could cause the above flu-like symptoms, nor did all workers demonstrate bites.
- Welsh, Louisiana (1962) – With students' sexual activity under close scrutiny by school officials, and following rumors of mandatory pregnancy tests, 21 girls and one boy in grades six to eleven were affected by seizures and other symptoms over six months.
- Blackburn faintings (1965) – In October 1965, several girls at a girls' school complained of dizziness in Blackburn, England. Some fainted. Within a couple of hours, 85 girls from the school were rushed by ambulance to a nearby hospital after fainting. Symptoms included swooning, moaning, chattering of teeth, hyperpnea, and tetany. A medical analysis of the event about one year later found that outbreaks began among the 14-year-olds, but that the heaviest incidence moved to the youngest age groups. There was no evidence of pollution of food or air. The younger girls proved more susceptible, but disturbance was more severe and lasted longer in the older girls. Using the Eysenck Personality Inventory, those affected had higher scores for extroversion and neuroticism. It was considered that the epidemic was hysterical, that a previous polio epidemic had rendered the population emotionally vulnerable, and that a three-hour parade, producing 20 faints on the day before the first outbreak, had been the specific trigger.
- Mount Pleasant, Mississippi (1976) – School officials suspected drug use after 15 students fell to the ground writhing, but no drugs were found and hysteria is assumed to be the culprit. At one point, one third of the school's 900 students stayed home for fear of being "hexed".
- Malaysia (1970s–1980s) – Mass hysteria in Malaysia affected school-age girls and young women working in factories. The locals have explained this outbreak as "spirits" having possessed the girls and young women.
- Hollinwell incident (1980) – Around 300 people, mostly children, but including adults and babies, suddenly had fainting attacks, nausea and other symptoms. The incident remains one of the prime examples of mass hysteria.
- West Bank fainting epidemic (1983) – a series of incidents in March 1983 wherein 943 Palestinian teenage girls, mostly schoolgirls, and a small number of IDF women soldiers fainted or complained of feeling nauseous in the West Bank. Israel was accused of using chemical warfare to sterilize West Bank women while IDF sources speculated that a toxic substance had been employed by Palestinian militants to stir up unrest, but investigators concluded that even if some environmental irritant had originally been present, the wave of complaints was ultimately a product of mass hysteria. This conclusion was supported by a Palestinian health official, who said that while 20% of the early cases may have been caused by the inhalation of some kind of gas, the remaining 80% were psychosomatic.
- 1981 clown panic (1981) – Starting in Boston, Massachusetts, numerous reports were made across the United States and Canada of evil clowns being seen and often engaging in frightening behavior. All recorded reports were made by children and there has been no conclusive evidence of any actual clown activity during the panic.
- Day-care sex-abuse hysteria – a moral panic that occurred primarily in the 1980s and early 1990s featuring charges against day-care providers of several forms of child abuse, including Satanic ritual abuse.
- Faaite demon exorcisms (1987) – Several people on the island of Faaite in French Polynesia who were followers of a branch of the Catholic Charismatic Renewal movement became convinced that a number of community members had become possessed by demons, and proceeded to attempt to exorcise them by beatings, drowning, and burning alive. Six people were charged and served varying sentences.
- San Diego (1988) – The U.S. Navy evacuated 600 men from barracks; 119 were sent to San Diego hospitals with complaints of breathing difficulty. No evidence of toxins, food poisoning, or any other cause was found.
- Kosovo student poisoning (1990) – alleged poisoning of thousands of Kosovan young people by toxic gases, was concluded by professor of medicine Zoran Radovanović to be a product of mass hysteria.
- Ganesha drinking milk miracle (1995)
- Belgium (June 1999) – Coca-Cola withdrew 30 million units of its soft-drink product from sale after more than a hundred people in Belgium and northern France complained of cramps, nausea and other problems after consuming the soft drinks. Testing found no evidence of tainted product and the incident was reported to be a panic, perhaps fueled by the discovery of dioxins in Belgian meat, which had brought down the national government earlier that year.

== 2000–present ==
- Monkey-man of Delhi (2001) – Rumors about a hairy monkey-looking monster attacking people in Delhi in India led to the deaths of several panicked people who fell from roofs or stairwells while fleeing what they thought was the monster.
- North Carolina (2002) – Ten girls developed seizures and other symptoms at a rural North Carolinian high school. Symptoms persisted for five months across various grade levels. Incidents tended to happen outside of class, with half of all incidents estimated to have occurred around lunch hour. Half of the affected were cheerleaders or former cheerleaders.
- "Strawberries with Sugar virus" (2006) – In May 2006, an outbreak of the so-dubbed Morangos com Açúcar Virus ('Strawberries with Sugar virus') was reported in Portuguese schools, named after the popular teen girl's show Morangos com Açúcar ('Strawberries With Sugar'). At least 300 students at 14 schools reported similar symptoms to those experienced by the characters in a then recent episode where a life-threatening virus affected the school depicted in the show. Symptoms included rashes, difficulty breathing, and dizziness. The belief that there was a medical outbreak forced some schools to temporarily close. The Portuguese National Institute for Medical Emergency eventually dismissed the illness as mass hysteria.
- Mexico City (2006–2007) – Between October 2006 and June 2007, near Chalco, a working-class suburb of Mexico City, mass hysteria resulted in an outbreak of unusual symptoms experienced by more than 500 adolescent female students at Children's Village School (Villa de las Ninas), a Catholic boarding-school. The affected students had difficulty walking and were feverish and nauseated, some becoming partially paralyzed.
- Vinton, Virginia (2007) – An outbreak of twitching, headaches and dizziness affected at least nine girls and one teacher at William Byrd High School. The episode lasted for months amid other local public health scares.
- Tanzania (2008) – In September 2008, 20 girls at a school in Tabora started fainting while taking their final year exams. The mass fainting according to one medical officer, has been linked to neurosis related to the local practice of witchcraft.
- Afghanistan (2009) – Starting around 2009, a spate of apparent poisonings at girls' schools across Afghanistan began to be reported, with symptoms including dizziness, fainting, and vomiting. The United Nations, World Health Organization and NATO's International Security Assistance Force carried out investigations of the incidents over multiple years, but never found any evidence of toxins or poisoning in the hundreds of blood, urine, and water samples they tested. The conclusion of the investigators was that the girls had a mass psychogenic illness. Despite these findings, Afghan officials often blame the incidents on the Taliban, accusing them of contaminating the school's water supply or using poison gas.
- Brunei (2010) – In April and May 2010, incidents of mass hysteria occurred at two all-girls secondary schools in Brunei. The most recent notable event happened on the 24 April 2014 in a public secondary school. The phenomenon caused a wave of panic among many parents, educators, and members of the community. Some of the students affected by the phenomenon claimed to have been possessed by spirits, or jinn, displaying histrionic symptoms such as screaming, shaking, fainting, and crying.
- Le Roy, New York (2011–12) – After 12 high school girls developed Tourette-like symptoms in 2011, their school was tested for toxins, and all other factors for their symptoms were ruled out. The case, and some of the girls and their parents, gained national media attention. In January 2012, several more students and a 36-year-old adult female came forward with similar symptoms. They were all diagnosed with conversion disorder.
- Sri Lanka (2012) – From November 15–20, 2012, incidents of mass hysteria occurred at 15 schools in Sri Lanka. More than 1,900 school children of 15 schools in Sri Lanka and five teachers were treated for a range of symptoms that included skin rashes, vomiting, vertigo, and cough due to allergic reactions believed to be mass hysteria. It originated at the Jinaraja Balika Vidyalaya in Gampola on November 15, 2012, when 1,100 students were admitted to hospital with a range of symptoms that included skin rashes, vomiting, vertigo and coughing. Later, authorities had to close down the school for 3 days. After that on November 16–19 there were more reports of students from other parts of the country showing similar symptoms.
- Charlie Charlie panic (2015) – Four teens in Tunja, Colombia, were hospitalized, and several in the Dominican Republic were considered "possessed by Satan" after playing the Charlie Charlie Challenge viral game.
- 2016 clown sightings – Sightings of people in evil clown costumes in the United States, Canada, and 18 other countries were dismissed as a case of mass hysteria, stating that a fear of clowns (which is common in children and adults) may be an underlying cause. The website Vox likewise claimed that "The Great Clown Panic of 2016 has been perpetuated by pretty much everyone except actual clowns."
- Recurrent epidemic of mass hysteria in Nepal (2016–2018) – A unique phenomenon of “recurrent epidemic of mass hysteria” was reported from a school of Pyuthan district of western Nepal in 2018. After a 9-year-old school girl developed crying and shouting episodes, quickly other children of the same school were also affected resulting in 47 affected students (37 females, 10 males) in the same day. Since 2016 similar episodes of mass psychogenic illness has been occurring in the same school every year. In 2016, twelve students were affected and in 2017, a total of 18 students of the same school were affected showing various symptoms in a single day. Hence it was thought to be a unique case of recurrent mass hysteria.
- Havana syndrome (2016-2023) Idiopathic symptoms experienced mostly abroad by U.S. government officials and military personnel, ranging in severity from pain and ringing in the ears to cognitive dysfunction, were first reported in 2016 by U.S. and Canadian embassy staff in Havana, Cuba. Beginning in 2017, more people, including U.S. intelligence and military personnel and their families, reported having these symptoms in places around the world including in Washington, D.C. Many U.S. federal government officials and agencies blamed the reported illnesses on attacks by unidentified foreign agents using unknown weaponry. In March 2023, seven U.S. intelligence agencies completed a review of the proposed cases and reported that "available intelligence consistently points against the involvement of US adversaries in causing the reported incidents" and that a foreign adversary's involvement was "very unlikely".
- Emirates Flight 203 (September 2018) – 106 of 521 passengers on a 14-hour flight from Dubai to New York reported symptoms including coughing, sneezing, fever, or vomiting. The pilot notified airport ground staff, and personnel from the U.S. Centers for Disease Control and Prevention met and quarantined the plane in New York and evaluated passengers, 11 of whom were sent to the hospital. A few passengers on the "flight from hell" turned out to have common colds or flu, with the other passengers coming to the belief that they were also sick after observing those around them.
- Ketereh, Malaysia (2019) – In August 2019, the BBC reported that schoolgirls at the Ketereh national secondary school (SMK Ketereh) in Kelantan, started screaming, with some claiming to have seen 'a face of pure evil'. Professor Simon Wessely a former president of the Royal College of Psychiatrists, suggested it was a form of 'collective behaviour'. Robert Bartholomew, a medical sociologist, suggested it was due to the stricter implementation of Islamic law in the school. The school responded to the outbreak by cutting down the trees around the school, believing they were home to supernatural spirits.
- Starehe Girls' Centre, Kenya (October 2019) – 52 students were isolated with an unknown disease, showing symptoms of a high-pitched cough, sneezing and low-grade fever, a number that later rose to 68. As the number rose, the school's administration shut the school down and instructed parents to pick up their daughters. Specimens collected from the affected students showed only two cases of rhinovirus, a virus that is the predominant cause of the common cold. After carrying out psychological assessments on the students, a team of mental health specialists dispatched by Kenya's Ministry of Health to the school concluded that the 'mysterious' disease was a case of mass hysteria.
- Iranian schoolgirls mass poisoning (2022-2023) – A series of alleged chemical attacks during which students in dozens of schools in Iran were reportedly poisoned in various and undetermined manners by unidentified perpetrators. These events started in November 2022 and reports of thousands of students being poisoned in ongoing assaults were claimed to have occurred in the following months. Mass psychogenic illness has been identified as a possible cause of the incidents.
- School and university shooting threats in Brazil (2023) – after the Blumenau school attack in Blumenau, in the Brazilian state of Santa Catarina and the Thomazia Montoro school shooting in São Paulo, a wave of threats against education centres throughout Brazil occurred, with many schools and universities being closed and students refusing to go to those vicinities or parents not allowing their children to go to school. While some of these threats were real, most of them turned out to be hoaxes motivated by mass hysteria.
- Musoli, Kenya (2023) – In October 2023, over 100 students from the St. Theresa’s Eregi Girls’ High School were hospitalized due to rapid and involuntary arm and leg movement, sometimes accompanied by headaches and vertigo. Routine medical tests revealed nothing unusual, and there were no signs of infectious disease as a cause. Ultimately it was decided that the events were caused by “stress due to upcoming exams” and the incident was determined to be an incident of “hysteria”.
- United States drone sightings (2024) – Starting 13 November 2024, reports of widespread drone sightings emerged in several regions of the United States. For approximately one month, commonfolk reported sightings on social media of drones which "emited a loud hum", were as large as cars, or flew without navigation lights. US officials commented on confirmed drone spottings and gave undue credence to unconfirmed spottings from civilians online. The incidence of spottings were partially attributed to a case of mass delusion, as well as suggestions of social panic over fear of new technologies and foreigners.

== Potential cases in non-human animals ==
- Great Sheep Panic (1888) – Several thousand sheep in Oxfordshire, England, begin displaying signs of distress and flee across an area of about 200 square miles (520 km^{2}). They were found the next morning, many still hiding and in distress. A similar event occurred the next year in Berkshire. Explanations are varied and include a chain reaction of individuals responding to other sheep's fear, which stemmed from the thunder that was reported that evening, in addition to claims of mass psychogenic illness.

== See also ==
- Body-centred countertransference
- Conversion disorder
- Folie à deux (from the French for "a madness shared by two")
- Hysterical contagion
- Psychochemical weaponry
