= 1983 West Bank fainting epidemic =

Mass event in Palestine

In late March and early April 1983, large numbers of Palestinians in the West Bank complained of fainting and dizziness, the vast majority of whom were teenage schoolgirls and a smaller number of whom were female Israeli soldiers. The symptoms led to 943 hospitalizations. Investigators concluded in April 1983 that the wave of complaints was likely the result of mass psychogenic illness, even if some environmental irritant had originally been present. This conclusion was supported by a Palestinian health official, who said that 20% of the early cases may have been caused by the inhalation of some kind of gas, but the remaining 80% were psychosomatic.

The fainting spells led to accusations and counter-accusations between Israelis and Palestinians. Israel even arrested some Palestinians during the outbreak, alleging that political agitation was behind the phenomenon. The New York Times reported that "Palestinian leaders have accused Israeli settlers and officials of using 'chemical warfare' in West Bank schools to drive Arabs out of the area" and that some Israeli officials "accused radical Palestinian factions of using gas or chemicals to incite demonstrations".

Albert Hefez was the lead Israeli psychiatric investigator into the incident, and he found that the Israeli press and Palestinian medical personnel both fueled the mass hysteria. He said the Israeli press, by speculating that "poison" was behind the incidents in its early reporting and quoting unnamed Israeli army officials as saying nerve gas was being used by Palestinian militants to provoke an uprising, spread panic. He found that Arab medical personnel, in turn, decided that the "poison" must be coming from the Israeli side.

Baruch Modan, director general of Israel's health ministry, also concluded that most of those affected had a psychological illness, though he said that some who fell ill after April 3 were faking, when epidemiologists say that the outbreak had subsided. Modan wrote in The Lancet that a "massive epidemic of psychogenic aetiology occurred in three districts of the West Bank over two weeks in March–April, 1983. It affected 949 individuals, 727 (77%) of them adolescent females. The symptoms were not accompanied by positive physical signs or by laboratory findings. The epidemiological pattern was pathognomonic of that of a psychogenic disorder. The initial trigger was probably the odour of H_{2}S escaping from a faulty latrine in the schoolyard of the first affected school. Subsequent spread of the disease was due to psychological and extra-medical factors, including publicity by the mass media. Spread was stopped immediately after closure of schools."

Hefez wrote in his 1985 study "The Role of the Press and the Medical Community in the epidemic of 'Mysterious Gas Poisoning' in the Jordan West Bank" that Israeli newspaper reports of poisoning at the start of the epidemic added fuel to the flames. A front-page article in Haaretz on March 28, 1983, even claimed that Israeli military investigators had found traces of nerve gas and quoted "army sources" as saying that they suspected that Palestinian militants were poisoning their own people in order to blame Israel and provoke an uprising. Palestinian leaders followed up with accusations that Israel had poisoned them in an attempt to drive them from the West Bank.

== Epidemic ==
The first fainting spells occurred on March 21, 1983, in the West Bank town of Arraba, Jenin. At roughly 8:00 am, "a 17-year-old student experienced a sensation of throat irritation and had difficulty breathing shortly after entering her classroom". Symptoms soon spread to six classmates and at least one teacher, and some of the girls complained of a smell like rotten eggs. "On the basis of the students' reports of odor, they suspected the presence of a toxic gas and immediately instituted a widespread but unsuccessful search for the source". Panic spread to other classes. Israeli and Palestinian doctors, on investigating, also reported a nauseating odour in the school. Cases of vomiting and complaints of blurred vision were also reported. Some girls fainted, including those in other classrooms. Affected students were taken to hospitals but no medical causes for their complaints were found. Some female Israeli soldiers who escorted the girls came down with the same symptoms, including nausea, dizziness, headache and stomach pains. The Arraba school in Arrabah saw 32 girls affected.

Over the next two weeks, 57 Palestinian girls complained of similar symptoms at Zahra Middle School in Jenin (March 26), 37 at Tulkarem (March 29), 310 in Hebron (early April) and other towns, with 943 people eventually hospitalized in the West Bank, Jerusalem and Tel Aviv. Israeli military authorities in the West Bank closed Palestinian schools for 20 days during the epidemic.

The U.S. Centers for Disease Control (CDC) wrote in a report that the epidemic occurred in three waves. The first wave from March 21 to 24 began at the Arraba school. The CDC reported that 70% of patients in the first wave were schoolgirls between 12 and 17 years old and that "clinical, epidemiologic, and toxicologic analyses indicated the illness was of psychogenic origin and was induced by stress. The outbreak, which began at a girls' secondary school, may have been triggered by the odor of low concentrations of hydrogen sulfide (H_{2}S) gas near the school".

The CDC defined the second wave as between March 26 and 28, mostly hitting Jenin and nearby villages. The second wave saw 367 people fall ill, 246 of them schoolgirls. The CDC reported that 67% of the patients in the epidemic's second wave were schoolgirls and that symptoms "developed in persons of all age groups and both sexes in an area of east Jenin after local residents observed a car moving through the streets emitting a thick cloud of smoke. The third wave was on April 3 with most of the cases in the Hebron area. Schools were closed in the West Bank after the April 3 outbreak and the epidemic ended.

== Accusations and political backdrop ==
Palestinian officials suggested the epidemic was the result of "chemical warfare" by the Israeli government or Israeli settlers, with the aim of driving Palestinians out of the West Bank or sterilizing Palestinian girls. PLO Chairman Yasser Arafat alleged it was part of a "planned and systematic crime against our people." Some Israeli officials accused the Palestinians of using poison to provoke mass demonstrations.

The Christian Science Monitor reported that events earlier in March had "produced a pervasive atmosphere of distrust throughout the West Bank. West Bankers' fears are fanned by statements like that of Deputy Speaker of the Knesset (parliament) Meir Cohen... who said in mid-March that Israel had made a fatal mistake when it did not drive 200,000 to 300,000 Arabs of the West Bank across the river Jordan in the 1967 war." The Monitor reported that "expulsion of Arabs from the West Bank has been advocated by the Kach movement of American-born Rabbi Meir Kahane, active on the West Bank" and that the outbreak came amid a "major Israeli settlement drive," creating an environment in which Palestinians were ready to believe they were being poisoned by Israel.

On March 29, 1983, the Deputy Permanent Observer of the Palestine Liberation Organization to the United Nations Hasan Abdul Rahman sent a letter to the President of the UN Security Council in which he charged that the fainting spells were caused by Israeli poisoning. Rahman wrote that a "sulfurous powder" was found at two schools, and that a coke bottle containing a "noxious substance" and "emitting fumes" was found at a third school. He concluded "it is without question that a new phase in Israel's campaign of genocide against the Palestinian people has been launched".

Brigadier Shlomo Iliya, the head of Israel's military administration in the West Bank, said on April 5 that his men had arrested a number of Palestinians, insisting that "political agitators" were behind the outbreak. He told a press conference that "Palestinian student organizations and other political bodies were behind the illness."

The Israeli government was of two minds about what was going on at the time of the epidemic. While Baruch Modan, the director general of Israel's health ministry believed they were "dealing with a case of mass hysteria rooted in the tense anti-Israeli climate in the occupied West Bank," Brig. Iliya said "we tend to think it was all provocation designed to stir up the normally quiet Jenin streets." Not all military officials agreed with him. Brig. Gen. Moshe Revah, head of the Israeli army's medical corps, acknowledged that 10 Israeli soldiers in Jenin had fallen ill, while two wearing gas masks had not.

== Findings ==
Baruch Modan, Director-General of the Israeli Ministry of Health said that the first cases could have been caused by an "environmental irritant". Yellow powder that was seen around some school in Jenin proved to be a common pollen. Though a trace of hydrogen sulfide was found, the Centers for Disease Control and Prevention, in Atlanta found that most of the fainting cases were psychological in nature. A Palestinian doctor from Hebron said "there is no sign of poisoning. Still, something has happened to these girls."

On March 31, 1983, the Permanent Representative to the UN from Iraq asked the Security Council to look into "the situation arising from the cases of mass poisoning which have affected more than 1,000 Palestinian schoolgirls," saying "these serious cases require that the Security Council discharge its responsibility under the Charter of the United Nations, in order to ensure Israel's compliance with the rules of international law relative to the protection of the civilian population in the occupied Arab and Palestinian territories."

On April 4, 1983, the UN Security Council met and formally requested the Secretary General of the UN to conduct an independent investigation of the "reported cases of poisoning." The UN investigation found that mass hysteria was the likeliest cause of the epidemic, as did the Red Cross, the World Health Organization and Israel's own lead psychiatric investigator, Albert Hefez.

On August 25, 1983 Yehuda Blum, Israel's Permanent Representative to the United Nations, wrote in a letter to the UN Secretary General that the accusations of poisoning by Israel were false and "Israel medical authorities, who immediately instituted an inquiry into the matter, could not establish the existence of any organic cause." A World Health Organization inquiry also found no organic causes for "this ill-defined health emergency." The letter also cites Red Cross doctor Franz Altherr, who felt it "was a mass phenomenon without any organic basis."

In late April, a team of US medical researchers from the Department of Health and Human Services released their own report, which "rejected contentions that 943 cases of acute illness over two weeks were caused by deliberate poisoning or were fabricated for propaganda purposes." The report "concluded that the outbreaks represented an epidemic of true psychologic illness and that the cause of this illness was anxiety." According to a report that month from the CDC, "Data collected...indicate that the West Bank epidemic was triggered either by psychological factors, or, more probably, by the odor of low, sub-toxic concentrations of H_{2}S gas escaping from a latrine at the secondary school in Arrabah. Subsequent propagation of the outbreak was mediated by psychological factors, occurred against a background of anxiety and stress, and may have been facilitated by newspaper and radio reports that described the symptoms in detail and suggested strongly that a toxic gas was the cause. The epidemic was probably terminated by the closing of West Bank schools. No evidence...indicate[d] that patients...deliberately or consciously fabricated their symptoms".

Albert Hefez, the lead psychiatric investigator of the epidemic for the Israeli Ministry of Health, found the illness spread through the community much like the Tanganyika laughter epidemic, and was boosted by the reporting of the Israeli press and Palestinian distrust of Israel's intentions in the West Bank. "The social and historical context of this incident may throw light on the subsequent snowballing of events," he wrote. "The Djenin area is located in the Jordan West Bank region occupied by Israeli forces since the 1967 six-day war. The Arab population perceives the situation as a temporary occupation but some tend to believe that the Israelis would do anything to perpetuate the status quo."

Hefez wrote that the outbreak took off after a March 26 article in the newspaper Maariv headlined "The Mysterious Poisoning goes on: 56 High School Girls in Djenin Poisoned". A front-page article from Haaretz on March 28 also fed local hysteria, he wrote. That article said Israeli investigators had found preliminary indications that nerve gas had been used and that "Israeli army sources suspected an attempt to provoke the Arab population in anticipation of the coming 'Day of the Land.'" A Maariv article from March 31 put forth the hypothesis that Palestinian activists were putting out a false story to provoke an uprising. Some Israeli doctors theorized the girls were playacting. In response, "the Arab league accused Israel of using chemical weapons to exterminate Arab people, and Arab doctors from Tul-Karem Hospital raised suspicion that the gas was intended to produce sterility in the affected girls". The epidemic had peaked by April 1, Hefez found. "The official communiqué rejecting any poisoning etiology, published in the morning paper Ha'aretz on April 1, appeared at the peak of this final wave. Although several cases appeared after this report, the panic declined".

In an "Editors Note", The New York Times apologized for its early coverage of the epidemic and how coverage had placed "greater emphasis on the charge of poisoning than on the Israeli rebuttal". The paper also apologized for quoting an Arab doctor in the West Bank without giving equal time to Israeli officials, who said he had been dismissed "as director of public health services" for "allow[ing] 'leftists' to loiter in the hospitals...discourag[ing] the hospitals from releasing the schoolgirls after they had recovered, and...trying to inflame the situation".

== Comparisons to a blood libel ==
Dan Margalit of the Israeli newspaper Haaretz wrote in March 1983 that the accusations leveled at Israel over the fainting spells "may yet become a modern blood libel against the Jews". Raphael Israeli's 2002 book, Poison: modern manifestations of a blood libel, argues that the fainting epidemic was largely a grand lie designed to harm the image of Israel.

== See also ==
- Tanganyika laughter epidemic
- Children in the Israeli–Palestinian conflict
- List of mass hysteria cases
- Media coverage of the Arab–Israeli conflict
