= Dancing plague of 1518 =

Mass dancing mania on Strasbourg

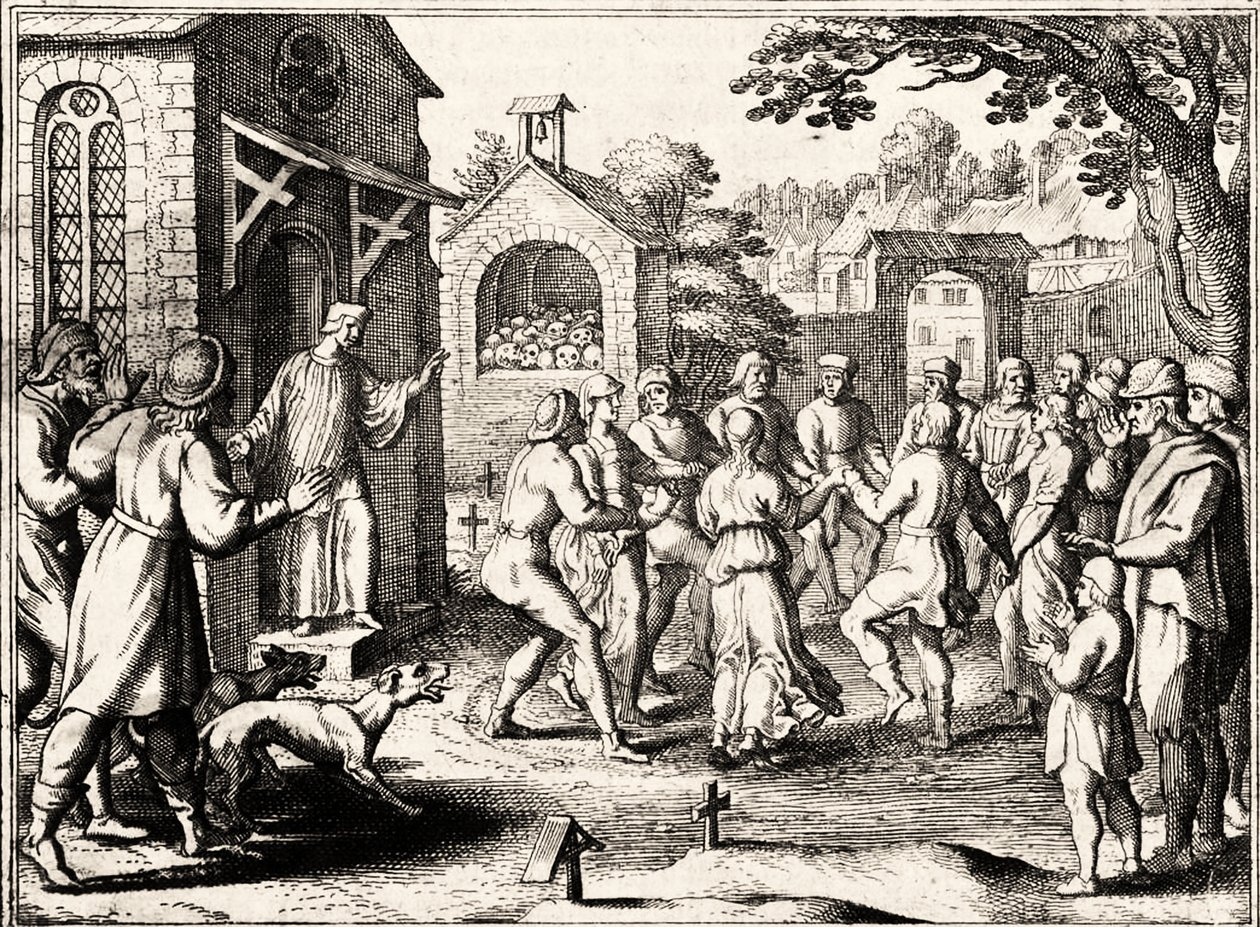
German engraving of the epidemic c.1600

The dancing plague of 1518, or dance epidemic of 1518 (French: Épidémie dansante de 1518; German: Straßburger Tanzwut), was a case of dancing mania that occurred in Strasbourg, Alsace (modern-day France), in the Holy Roman Empire from July 1518 to September 1518. Somewhere between 50 and 400 people took to dancing for weeks. There are many theoretical theories behind the phenomenon, the most popular being stress-induced mass hysteria, suggested by John Waller. Other theories include ergot poisoning. There is controversy concerning the number of deaths, but the total is unknown.

== History ==
=== Events ===
The outbreak began in July 1518 when a woman known as Frau Troffea began to dance fervently and uncontrollably in a street in Strasbourg. According to Ned Pennant-Rea, "Frau Troffea had started dancing on July 14th on the narrow cobbled street outside her half-timbered home. As far as we can tell she had no musical accompaniment but simply 'began to dance' ... some of those who had witnessed her strange performance had begun to mimic her, including her husband, and within days more than thirty choreomaniacs were in motion, some so monomaniacally that only death would have the power to intervene." Troffea kept up the constant dancing for a week only stopping to sleep after which she continued. Soon, three dozen others joined in. By August, the "dancing plague" afflicted between 50 and 400 people. Dancers were beginning to collapse. The victims' movements were described as spasmatic with many convulsions and their bodies were left drenched in sweat. Their arms would thrash violently and some noted that their eyes were vacant and expressionless. Blood would pool into their swollen feet and they would eventually bleed into their shoes. Often, there would also be cries for help from the affected. If the victims did not succumb to a heart attack, they would collapse from extreme exhaustion, hunger, and thirst. Historians disagree over whether and how many deaths occurred, though some claim there were as many as 15 deaths per day during the outbreak’s peak. No one knew what caused this reaction, which meant no one understood how to remedy it. By early September, the outbreak began to subside.

Historic documents, including "physician notes, cathedral sermons, local and regional chronicles, and even notes issued by the Strasbourg city council" are clear that the victims danced; it is not known why. Historical sources agree that there was an outbreak of dancing after a single woman started to dance, and the dancing did not seem to die down. It lasted for such a long time that it even attracted the attention of the authorities; until the council gave up authority to the physicians, who prescribed the afflicted to "dance themselves free of it." There are claims that guild halls were refurbished to accommodate the dancing, as well as musicians and strong people to help keep those dealing with the dancing mania to stay upright. This backfired, and the council was forced to ban public dancing as people danced in fear it was a punishment from Saint Vitus; and to be "free of sin" many joined in on the dancing epidemic. When divine punishment or demonic possession initiated and sustained frenzied dancing, only those with divinely bestowed authority could restore the sinners to wholeness and to a right relationship with the divine. Those who danced were then ordered to go to the shrine of Saint Vitus who was believed to punish sinners by compelling them to dance uncontrollably. According to contemporary accounts, they wore red shoes that had been sprinkled with holy water and had painted crosses on the tops and soles. They also had to hold small crosses in their hands; and incense and Latin incantations were part of this "ritual." Word soon spread that participants had been "forgiven by Vitus," suggesting the ritual's success. The Dancing Plague ultimately ceased in September, when the remaining dancers were led to a mountaintop chapel to pray for absolution.

Events similar to this are said to have occurred throughout the medieval age including 11th century in Cölbigk, Saxony, where it was believed to be the result of divine judgment. In 15th century Apulia, Italy, a woman was bitten by a tarantula, the venom making her dance convulsively. The only way to cure the bite was to "shimmy" and to have the right sort of music available, which was an accepted remedy by scholars like Athanasius Kircher.

Contemporaneous explanations included demonic possession, divine judgement and overheated blood. It was believed that overheated blood could be cured by continuous dancing followed by rest to cool it. The use of chemicals targeting ticklish areas of the body's surface along with the cooling of blood were thought of as a cure to the continuous dancing.

== Veracity of deaths ==
Disagreement exists over whether people ultimately danced to death. Some sources claim that for a period the plague killed around fifteen people per day, but the sources of the city of Strasbourg at the time of the events did not mention the number of deaths, or even if there were fatalities. There do not appear to be any sources related to the events that make note of any fatalities. Ned Pennant-Rea also claims that the final death toll is not known, but if the claims of fifteen people dying per day were true then the toll could be "into the hundreds".

The main source for the claim is John Waller, who has written several journal articles on the subject and the book A Time to Dance, a Time to Die: The Extraordinary Story of the Dancing Plague of 1518. The sources cited by Waller that mention deaths were all from later accounts of the events. There is also uncertainty around the identity of the initial dancer (either an unnamed woman or "Frau Troffea") and the number of dancers involved (somewhere between 50 and 400). Of the six chronicle accounts, four support Lady Troffea as the first dancer.

== Modern theories ==
=== Food poisoning ===
Some believe the dancing could have been brought on by food poisoning caused by the toxic and psychoactive chemical products of ergot fungi (ergotism), which grows commonly on grains (such as rye) used for baking bread. Ergotamine is the main psychoactive product of ergot fungi; it is structurally related to the drug lysergic acid diethylamide (LSD-25) and is the substance from which LSD-25 was originally synthesized. The same fungus has also been implicated in other major historical anomalies, including the Salem witch trials.

In The Lancet, John Waller argues that "this theory does not seem tenable, since it is unlikely that those poisoned by ergot could have danced for days at a time. Nor would so many people have reacted to its psychotropic chemicals in the same way. The ergotism theory also fails to explain why almost every outbreak occurred somewhere along the Rhine and Moselle rivers, areas linked by water but with quite different climates and crops."

=== Stress-induced mass hysteria ===
This could have been an example of fully developed cases of psychogenic movement disorder happening in mass hysteria or mass psychogenic illness, which involves many individuals suddenly exhibiting the same bizarre behavior. The behavior spreads rapidly and broadly in an epidemic pattern. This kind of comportment could have been caused by elevated levels of psychological stress, caused by the ruthless years (even by the rough standards of the early modern period) the people of Alsace were suffering.

Waller speculates that the dancing was "stress-induced psychosis" on a mass level, since the region where the people danced was riddled with starvation and disease, and the inhabitants tended to be superstitious. This, Waller believed, put the dancers in an "altered state of consciousness" that placed victims in a trance and made people lose their sense of reality. Seven other cases of dancing plague were reported in the same region during the medieval era where dancers were also depicted to be in a trance.

This psychogenic illness could have created a chorea (from the Greek khoreia meaning "to dance"), a situation comprising random and intricate unintentional movements that flit from body part to body part. Diverse choreas (St. Vitus' dance, St. John's dance, and tarantism) were labeled in the Middle Ages referring to the independent epidemics of "dancing mania" that happened in central Europe, particularly at the time of the plague.

== Pop culture and media ==
The event inspired Jonathan Glazer's 2020 short film Strasbourg 1518.

It was the inspiration behind the 2022 choral song "Choreomania" by Florence and the Machine. It was the third track on the album Dance Fever, which took its title from the song.

The book series A Collection of Utter Speculation released a title The Dancing Plague: A Collection of Utter Speculation in 2022. It is a fictional account of the events that happened in Strasbourg.

The event inspired the music video short-film for Loreen and Ólafur Arnalds joint 2025 release of their songs "In The Sound of Breathing" and "Opening" under the name "SAGES".

The event is the subject of the song "Died of Dancing", by Australian progressive rock band Toehider. The song directly references "Mrs. Troffea" and "hot blood" in the lyrics.

== See also ==
- The Dancing Mania, an epidemic of the Middle Ages – 1832 book
- Sydenham's chorea
- Tanganyika laughter epidemic
