= The Dancing Mania, an epidemic of the Middle Ages =

1832 book by Justus Friedrich Karl Hecker

The Dancing Mania: an epidemic of the Middle Ages
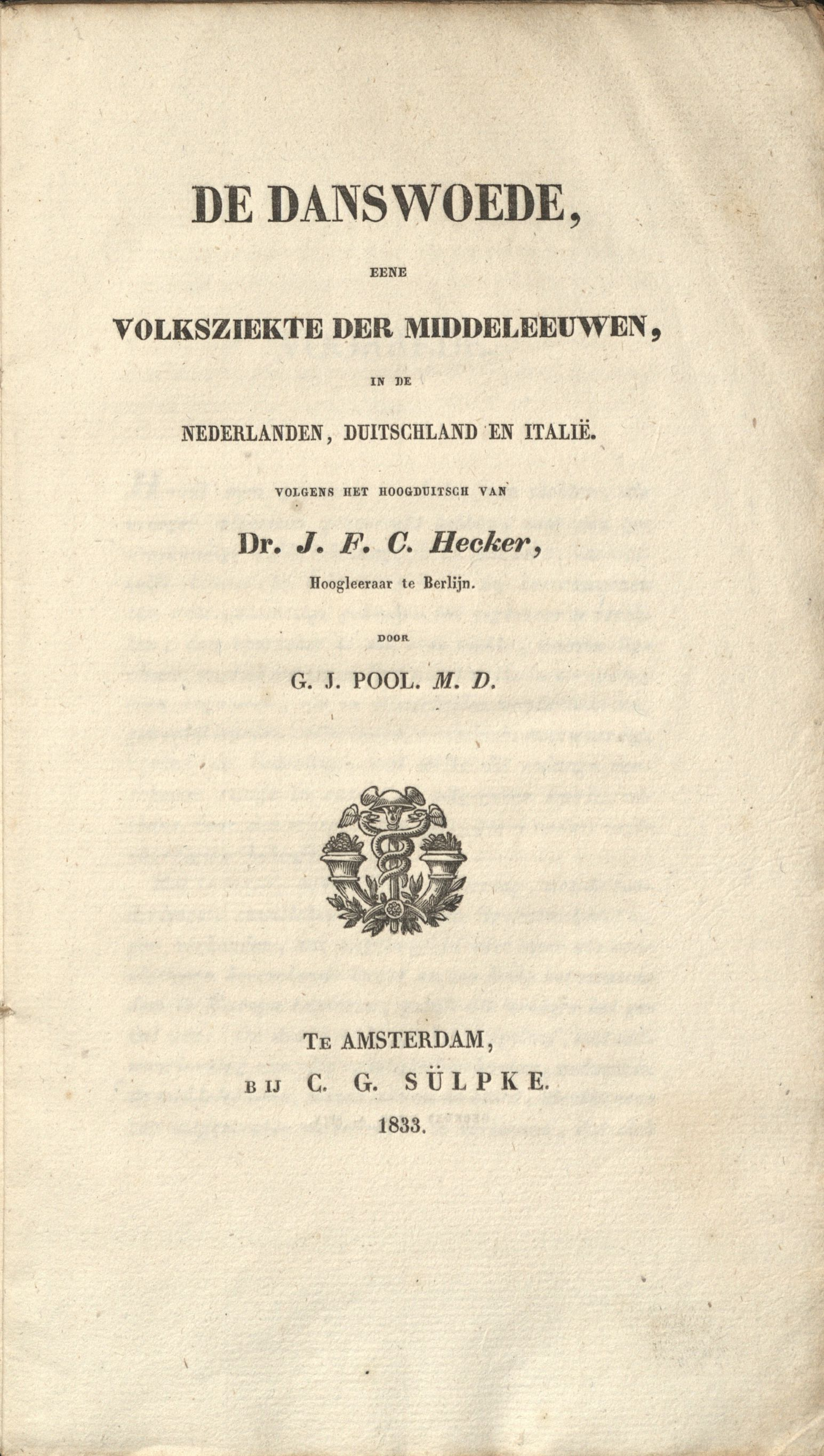
- Title page of the book, Dutch edition
- Author: Justus Friedrich Karl Hecker
- Language: German
- Publication date: 1832
- Publication place: Germany

The Dancing Mania, an epidemic of the Middle Ages is a historical-pathological investigative book originally written and published in German by Justus Friedrich Karl Hecker (1795–1850) in 1832 as Die Tanzwuth, eine Volkskrankheit im Mittelalter: nach den Quellen für Aerzte und gebildete Nichtärzte bearbeitet. The full translated English title is The Dancing Mania, an epidemic of the Middle Ages: from the sources for physicians and erudite non-physicians (in short, The Dancing Mania). Hecker combines multiple sources about the dancing mania (also known as the dancing plague, choreomania, St. John's dance, St. Vitus' dance or tarantism), an epidemic which occurred mainly between the 14th and 17th centuries. The dancing mania is described by the author as a historical case of mass hysteria, and Hecker further investigates the conditions and circumstances surrounding the dancing mania during the outbreaks. The book has also been published in combination with The Black Death in the fourteenth century (1832) and The Sweating Sickness: A medical contribution to the story of the fifteenth and sixteenth century (1834) in a book called The Epidemics of the Middle Ages by doctor August Hirsch in 1865 after Hecker's death. The Dancing Mania (1832) sparked new interest in the dancing plague and mass hysteria at the time of publication, leading to much further research on the topic.

== Context ==
Hecker graduated from the University of Berlin in 1817 and became a lecturer at the medical faculty of the university the same year. During this time, he also worked as an individual researcher with a focus on the historical side of medical science. After writing his first books about his research, History of Medicine, produced from the sources Volumes 1 and 2 (1822-1829), on the history of medicine covering the years 2000 B.C. until the fall of the Byzantine Empire in 1453 A.D., Hecker started research on several epidemics throughout history. Hecker's first book on historical epidemics was The Dancing Mania, shortly followed by The Black Death in the fourteenth century (in short, The Black Death), both of which were written in 1832 during his time as a professor extraordinarius of history of medicine at the University of Berlin.

The dancing plague is an epidemic that occurred multiple times between the 14th and 17th century in different European regions. Key sources from 1518 used by Hecker in The Dancing Mania identify the diagnosis of 'hot blood' given to the afflicted, as well as the common belief at the time that the plague was caused by demonic possession. For example, in one source from the early 16th century, Paracelsus' misogynistic views led to a theory that the dancing plague was caused by women, with three different subtypes of the illness caused by either imagination, sensual desires, and corporeal causes (such as mental illnesses in unhappy wives). Previous medical theories considered the dancing plague to be a form of physical illness. For example, Thomas Sydenham explored chorea in the 17th century, in which his description of symptoms of what he named chorea minor (also known as Sydenham's chorea) were very similar to what was observed in those afflicted with the dancing plague. Sydenham's chorea was often incorrectly referred to as St. Vitus' dance.

The research that had previously been done was limited, and existing literature on the topic at the time of publication only existed in the form of newspaper articles, personal accounts, and communications between people. Prior to the publication of The Dancing Mania, such sources had never been combined into one piece of literature, making Hecker's book the first on the topic. Throughout The Dancing Mania, Hecker describes many of the existing theories at the time, and takes them into consideration when developing his own. St. Vitus' dance (1518) is the outbreak of the dancing plague that was most thoroughly documented, and is the outbreak discussed the most in-depth by Hecker. Hecker considered the dancing plague a form of psychological illness, specifically a form of mass hysteria brought about by human sympathy.

== Contents ==
Throughout The Dancing Mania, Hecker argues how certain sets of circumstances led to the dancing mania across different regions, and that no two outbreaks were the same. He also emphasises the key role that human sympathy plays in the spread of the dancing mania. Hecker uses footnotes throughout the book to provide sources for accounts and theories described.

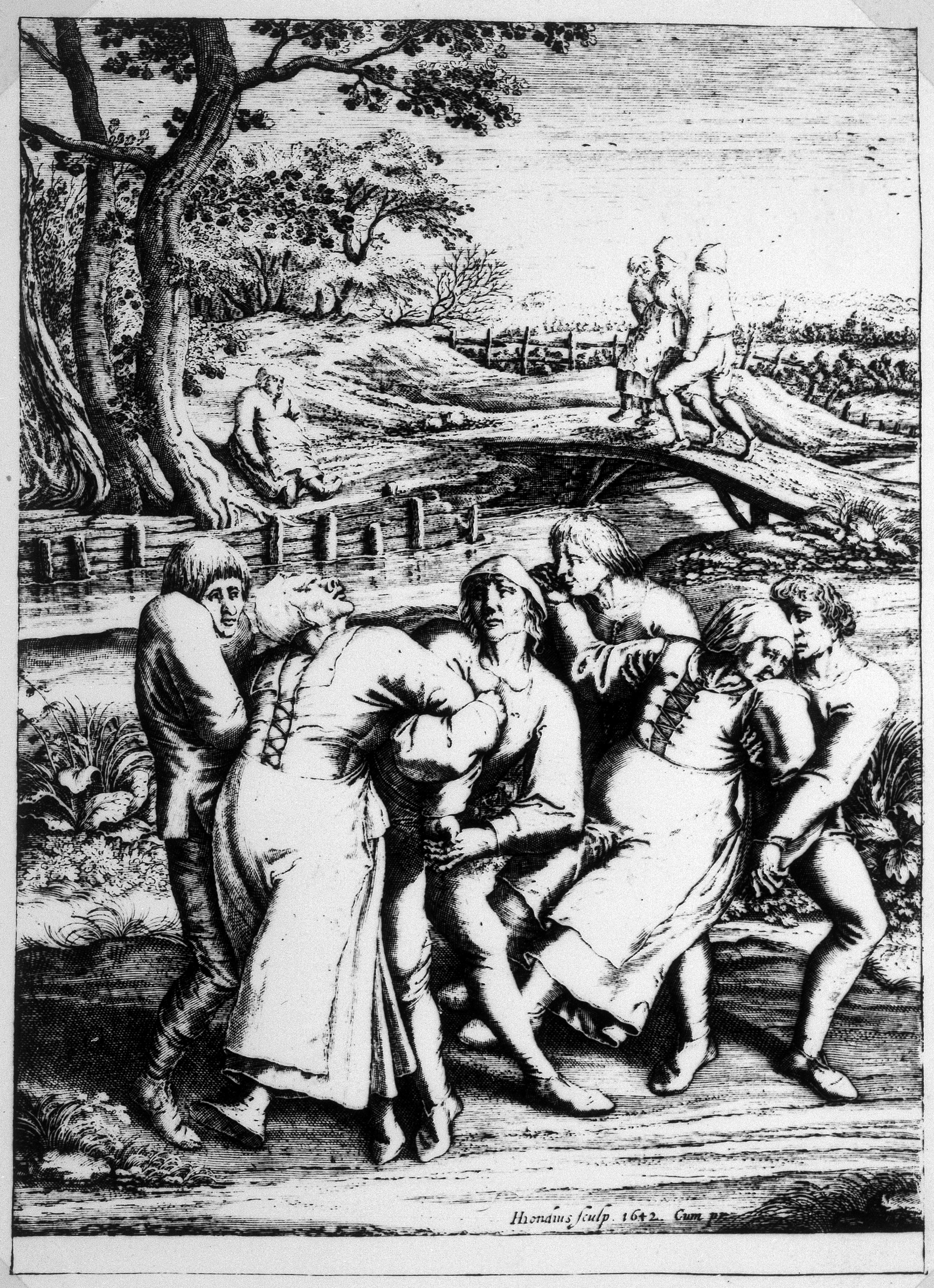
Illustration of St. John's dance of 1518 from Die Medizin in der klassischen Malerei (1923) by Eugen Holländer

=== Chapter 1: The dancing mania in Germany and the Netherlands ===
The first chapter of the book describes the key occurrences of the dancing mania in Northern Europe, specifically, St. John's dance and St. Vitus' dance. Hecker later explores possible explanations of the causes of the outbreaks. He theorises that outbreaks of dancing plagues cannot occur in the same way as a previous outbreak, as each outbreak comes from the combination of multiple events that are unlikely to co-occur again. Hecker suggests that the Northern European outbreaks occurred as a result of religion and religious events, oppression, natural disasters, civic unrest, and feuds.

=== Chapter 2: The dancing mania in Italy ===
The second chapter explores another form of the dancing plague that occurred in Apulia, Italy, known as tarantism. The affected population in Italy believed at the time that tarantism was caused by the bite of a tarantula. However, the symptoms of tarantism and the symptoms of a tarantula bite differed, as the key symptom of the dancing plague (an irresistible propensity for dancing) does not occur as a result of a tarantula's poison. Hecker proposes that, like in Germany and the Netherlands, the dancing plague occurred as a result of specific circumstances: the fear of a tarantula bite, the self-deception of having been bitten, and human sympathy occurring alongside music commonly being played in the streets lead to the outbreaks in Italy.

=== Chapter 3: The dancing mania in Abyssinia ===
The dancing mania in Abyssinia was a current event at the time of publication. In this chapter, Hecker provides the eye-witness account of Nathaniel Pearce, who resided in Abyssinia from 1810 to 1819 and described the dancing mania (here, named Tigretier) in the streets of Tigre. Hecker argues that the dancing plague in Abyssinia was occurring due to oppression, insecurity, and religion.

=== Chapter 4: Sympathy ===
According to Hecker, sympathy played a key role in the occurrence of the dancing mania or tarantism. People will take on the maladies of others, expressing the same symptoms without an underlying physical cause. Hecker provides several examples of other diseases or outbreaks that resulted from imitation, sympathy and compassion. The described illnesses all resulted from symptoms presenting in one individual, which spread (without physical cause) to other people. The most well-known event described by Hecker was that of the Convulsionnaires in France.

== Reception ==
After his book on the dancing mania, Hecker's research on historical epidemics continued, such as the sweating sickness, the Black Death and infant mortality throughout history. As well as his individual works, he also contributed to multiple encyclopedias and medical journals. As a result of the publication of his larger and smaller works (in particular The Dancing Mania and The Black Death) and despite the work of his predecessors, Hecker is considered the founder of historical pathology, and has been praised for the thoroughness of his collected works. His academic work, such as this book, earned him the title of professor ordinarius in history of medicine, which he held until his death in 1850. As Hecker was the first carry out in-depth research on the dancing plague in academic literature and due to his title of professor ordinarius, his theory on the dancing plague had merit. He is also the first to have theorised that mass hysteria played a key role in outbreaks of the dancing plague.

Following Hecker's death, The Dancing Mania and other work on the epidemics of the Middle Ages were expanded upon by Hirsch (original German title: Die großen Volkskrankheiten des Mittelalters. Historisch-pathologische Untersuchungen. Gesammelt und in erweiterter Bearbeitung). In 1888, Benjamin G. Babington translated and combined two of Hecker's most successful works into The Black Death & The Dancing Mania (published in English). The Dancing Mania was also translated into both French and Italian. These early historical-pathological research books (The Dancing Mania and The Black Death) sparked new interest in history of pathology and the number of research papers on pathology increased significantly after 1833 following Hecker's three initial publications.

After Hecker's death in 1850, The Dancing Mania has been cited in works that discuss mass hysteria. One such article was published in The British Medical Journal in 1859 in which the unnamed author uses Hecker's work to emphasise the need to view epidemics of mental diseases without the ignorance that comes along with religion. Like Hecker, the author argues that in cases of mass hysteria (such as during the dancing plague), religion worsens the outbreak. The Dancing Mania has also been referenced in multiple 20th and 21st century research articles on the dancing plague.

The Dancing Plague was also cited in a 1880 British Medical Journal article in which the author A. Brabazon expands upon the dancing plague and describes his findings on the use of bath mineral waters as a historical treatment method of the dancing plague (which had not been discovered or researched by Hecker).

Following the publication of Hecker's book and due to the fact that Hecker was the first to publish a theory that mass hysteria was the cause of the dancing plague, research on mass psychogenic illnesses increased and was linked back to Sydenham's chorea, a disease characterised by uncontrolled jerking movements and previously theorised to be the cause of the dancing plague. Due to the similarities of symptoms in each condition, 19th century physicians worked on refining Sydenham's chorea, its causes, and differential diagnoses, they found that Sydenham's chorea was actually not a psychological disorder, but a neurological disorder similar to Huntington's disease. This differentiation between psychological disorders and neurological disorders showing similar symptoms lead to the development of different theories on the dancing plague after the 19th century.

In the 20th and 21st centuries, further theories on the causes of the dancing plague arose. Hecker's theory on the role of mass hysteria, religious festivals and the accumulation of multiple time- and place-specific circumstances remains one of the key explanations of why the dancing plague occurred. The theory that the dancing occurred as a way to relieve shared stress caused by conditions at the time draws from Hecker's theory. Researchers looked into other possible explanations and counterarguments to Hecker's theory based on the circumstances at the time of the outbreaks, such as ergot poisoning (ergotis)) as a result of floods, encephalitis, epilepsy, typhus, and religious pilgrimage but were unable to provide an explanation for all symptoms and the spread of the disease. A popular theory is that the outbreaks were staged, possibly as a result of religious cults acting out organised dances. No general consensus has been reached, however, it is generally agreed upon that those who danced did not do so voluntarily and that many dancers likely had underlying psychological disturbances, as already hypothesised by Hecker in The Dancing Mania.
