= Compulsive dancing =

Compulsive dancing may refer to:

- Dancing mania, mass outbreaks of dancing primarily in medieval Europe
- O.C.D. (Obsessive Compulsive Dancing), the second studio album of singer Sarah Hudson.
