= Saint Vitus =

Sicilian saint

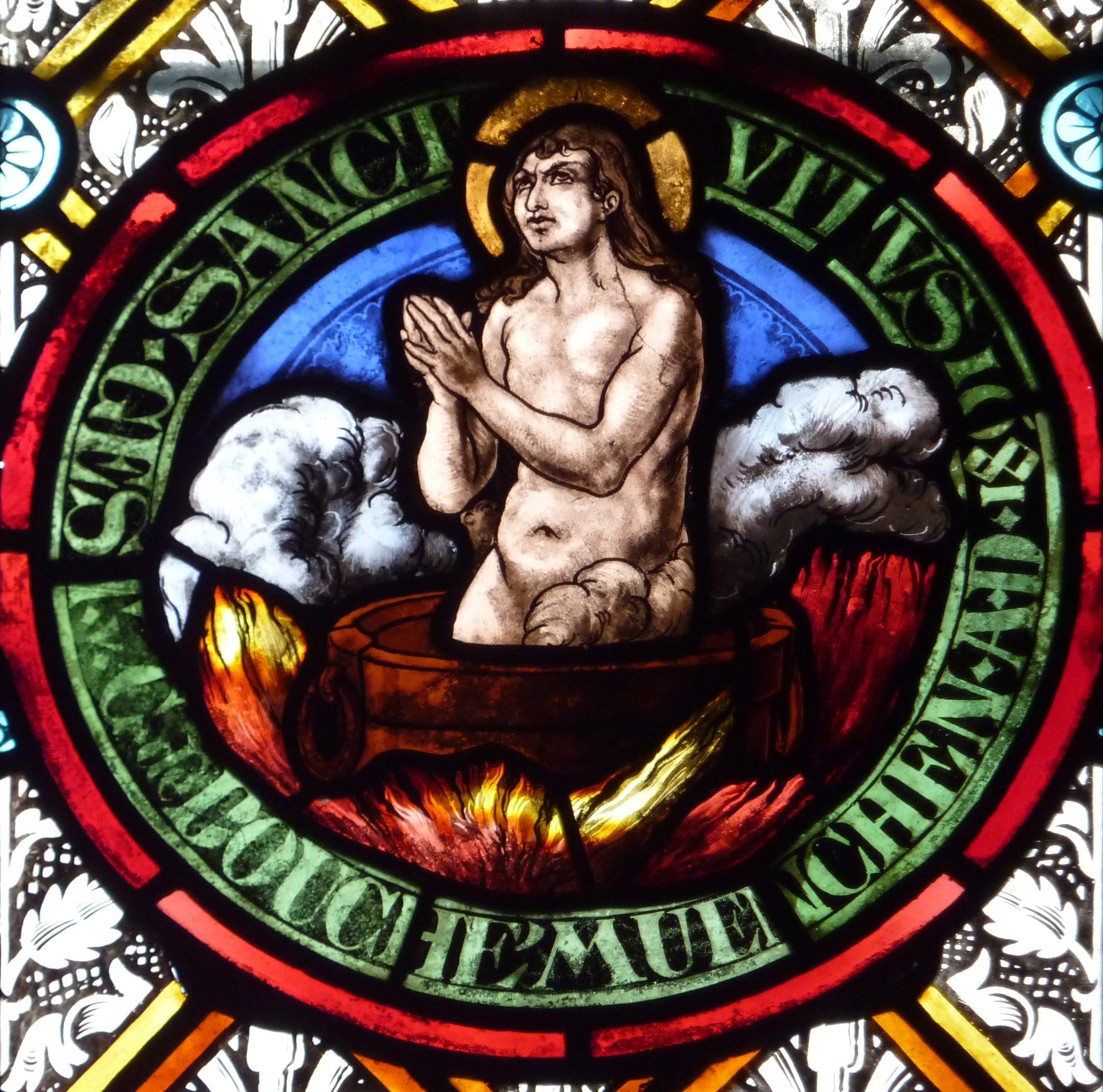
- Saint Vitus in stained glass, St. Veit an der Gölsen, Austria

Martyr, Holy Helper
- Born: c. 290; Mazzara del Vallo, Sicily
- Died: c. 303 (age 12–13); Lucania, modern-day Basilicata, Italy
- Venerated in: Catholic Church; Eastern Orthodox Church
- Feast: 15 June
- Attributes: Depicted in a cauldron, with a rooster or a lion
- Patronage: Actors; comedians; Rijeka, Croatia; Czechoslovakia; dancers; dogs; epilepsy; Mazara del Vallo, Sicily; Forio, Ischia; oversleeping; Prague, Czech Republic; rheumatic chorea (Saint Vitus' Dance); snake bites; storms; Vacha, Germany; Zeven, Lower Saxony; the Gooi, Netherlands; E Clampus Vitus

Vitus (/ˈvaɪtəs/), whose name is sometimes rendered Guy or Guido, was a Christian martyr from Sicily. His earliest known hagiography is documented in the Martyrologium Hieronymianum. The dates of his actual life are unknown. He has long been tied to the Sicilian martyrs Modestus and Crescentia but in the earliest sources it is clear that these were originally different traditions that later became combined. The figures of Modestus and Crescentia are probably fictitious.

According to his hagiography, he died during the Diocletianic Persecution in AD 303. In the Middle Ages, he was counted as one of the Fourteen Holy Helpers. In Germany, his feast was celebrated with dancing before his statue. This dancing became popular and the name "Saint Vitus Dance" was given to the neurological disorder Sydenham's chorea. It also led to Vitus being considered the patron saint of dancers and of entertainers in general. He is also said to protect against lightning strikes, animal attacks and oversleeping. His feast day is celebrated on 15 June. In places where the Julian calendar is used, this date coincides, in the 20th and 21st centuries, with 28 June on the Gregorian calendar.

== Martyrdom ==
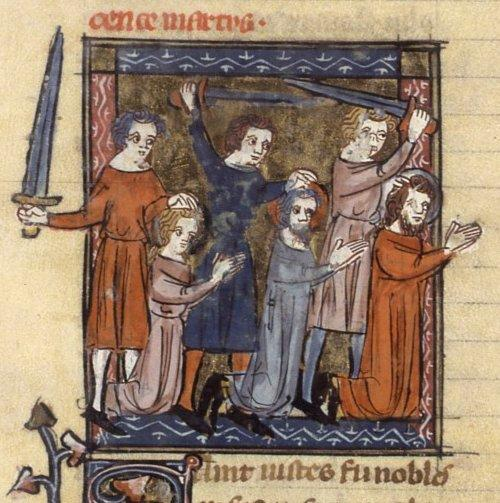
The martyrdom of Vitus, Modestus, and Crescentia, from a fourteenth-century manuscript

According to the hagiography, Vitus, Modestus and Crescentia were martyrs under Diocletian. The earliest testimony for their veneration is offered by the "Martyrologium Hieronymianum" (ed. G. B. de Rossi-Louis Duchesne, 78: "In Sicilia, Viti, Modesti et Crescentiae"). The fact that the note is in the three most important manuscripts indicates that it was also in the common exemplar of these, which appeared in the fifth century. The same Martyrologium has under the same day another mention of a Vitus at the head of a list of nine martyrs, with the statement of the place, in Eboli, "In Lucania", that is, in the Roman province of that name in southern Italy between the Tuscan Sea and the Gulf of Taranto. It is easily possible that it is the same martyr Vitus in both cases.

According to J. P. Kirsch, the testimony to the public veneration of the three saints in the fifth century proves that they are historical martyrs. There are, nevertheless, no historical accounts of them, nor of the time or the details of their martyrdom.

During the sixth and seventh centuries a purely legendary narrative of their martyrdom appeared, seemingly based upon other legends, especially on the legend of Potitus, and ornamented with accounts of fantastic miracles. According to this legend, Vitus was a 7-year-old son of a senator of Lucania (some versions make him 12 years old). He resisted his father's attempts, which included various forms of torture, to make him turn away from his faith. He fled with his tutor Modestus and Modestus's wife Crescentia, who was Vitus's nanny, to Lucania. He was taken from there to Rome to drive out a demon which had taken possession of a son of the Emperor Diocletian. He successfully performed the exorcism, but, because he stayed faithful to Christianity, he and his tutors were tortured. By a miracle an angel brought back the three to Lucania, where they died from the tortures they had endured. Three days later, Vitus appeared to a distinguished matron named Florentia, who then found the bodies and buried them where they lay.

== Veneration ==
St. Vitus Cathedral is the main church of the former imperial capital, Prague.

The veneration of the martyrs spread rapidly in Southern Italy and Sicily, as is shown by the note in the "Martyrologium Hieronymianum". Pope Gregory the Great mentions a monastery dedicated to Vitus in Sicily ("Epist.", I, xlviii, P.L., LXXXVII, 511).

The veneration of Vitus, the chief saint of the group, also appeared very early at Rome. Pope Gelasius I (492–496) mentions a shrine dedicated to him (Jaffé, "Reg. Rom. Pont.", 2nd ed., I, 6 79), and at Rome in the seventh century the chapel of a deaconry was dedicated to him ("Liber Pont.", ed. Duchesne, I, 470 sq.).

In AD 756, Abbot Fulrad is said to have brought the relics of St. Vitus to the monastery of St-Denis. They were later presented to Abbot Warin of Corvey in Germany, who solemnly transferred some of them to this abbey in AD 836. From Corvey the veneration of St Vitus spread throughout Westphalia and in the districts of eastern and northern Germany. His popularity grew in Prague, Bohemia when, in AD 925, king Henry I of Germany presented as a gift the bones of one hand of St. Vitus to Wenceslaus, Duke of Bohemia. Since then, this relic has been a sacred treasure in the St. Vitus Cathedral in Prague. Other relics of Saint Vitus were taken in Pavia (they were kept in the church of San Marino) by the emperor Charles IV in 1355 and were brought to Prague.

The veneration of St. Vitus became very popular in Slavic lands, where his name (Sveti Vid) may have replaced more ancient worship of the god of light Svetovid.

In Serbia his feast day, known as Vidovdan, is of particular historical importance. The day is part of the Kosovo Myth — the Battle of Kosovo occurred on that day; several events have symbolically occurred on that day, such as the 1914 assassination of the Austrian royal couple; Vitus was the patron saint of the Kingdom of Serbia. In Hungary he has been venerated as Szent Vid since the early Middle Ages. In Bulgaria, it is called Vidovden (Видовден) or Vidov Den (Видов ден) and is particularly well known among the Shopi, in the western part of the country. In Croatia, 123 churches are dedicated to St. Vitus.

In the Netherlands, Vitus is the patron saint of Winschoten, as well as of the region of the Gooi, where in each of the three largest towns (Hilversum, Bussum and Naarden), the main Catholic Church is dedicated to St Vitus.

Vitus is one of the Fourteen Martyrs who give aid in times of trouble. He is specifically invoked against chorea, which is called St. Vitus Dance.

He is represented as a young man with a palm-leaf, in a cauldron, sometimes with a raven and a lion, his iconographic attribute because according to the legend he was thrown into a cauldron of boiling tar and molten lead, but miraculously escaped unscathed.

The names of Saints Modestus and Crescentia were added in the 11th century to the Roman Calendar, so that from then on all three names were celebrated together until 1969, when their feast was removed from the General Roman Calendar. Vitus is still recognized as a saint of the Catholic Church, being included in the Roman Martyrology under 15 June, and Mass may be celebrated in his honor on that day wherever the Roman Rite is celebrated, while Modestus and Crescentia, who are associated with Vitus in legend, have been omitted, because they appear to be merely fictitious personages.

Vitus is the patron saint of the city of Rijeka in Croatia; the towns of Ciminna and Vita in Sicily; Forio on the island of Ischia, the town of Sapri in Campania; the contrada of San Vito, in Torella dei Lombardi, in Avellino; the town of Rapone, Italy; the Gooi region in the Netherlands; the Italian colony of San Vito in Costa Rica; and the town of St. Vith in Belgium. Various places in Austria and Bavaria are named Sankt Veit in his honour.

The saint's feast day is also the subject of a popular weather rhyme: "If St. Vitus' Day be rainy weather, it shall rain for thirty days together". This rhyme often appears in such publications as almanacs; its origin is uncertain.

Michael J. Towsend writes that "the phrase 'The patron saint of Methodism is St Vitus' summed up with reasonable accuracy many people's impressions of the Methodist Church. Methodists, surely, are supremely busy people, always rushing around organizing things and setting up committees to do good works. They can generally be relied upon to play their part in running Christian Aid Week, the sponsored walk for the local hospice or the group protesting about homelessness, and they are known, even now, to be activists in trades unions and political parties."

== Gallery ==
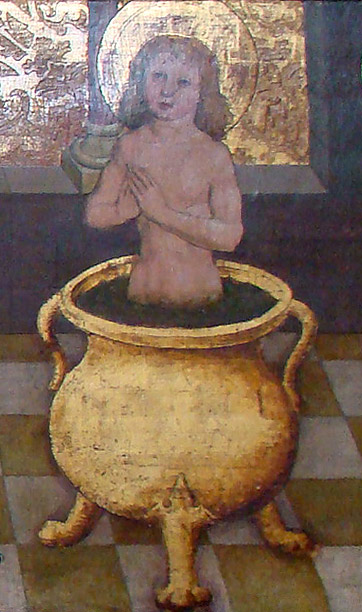
Martyrdom of Saint Vitus, Germany circa 1515, St. Vitus church, Flein

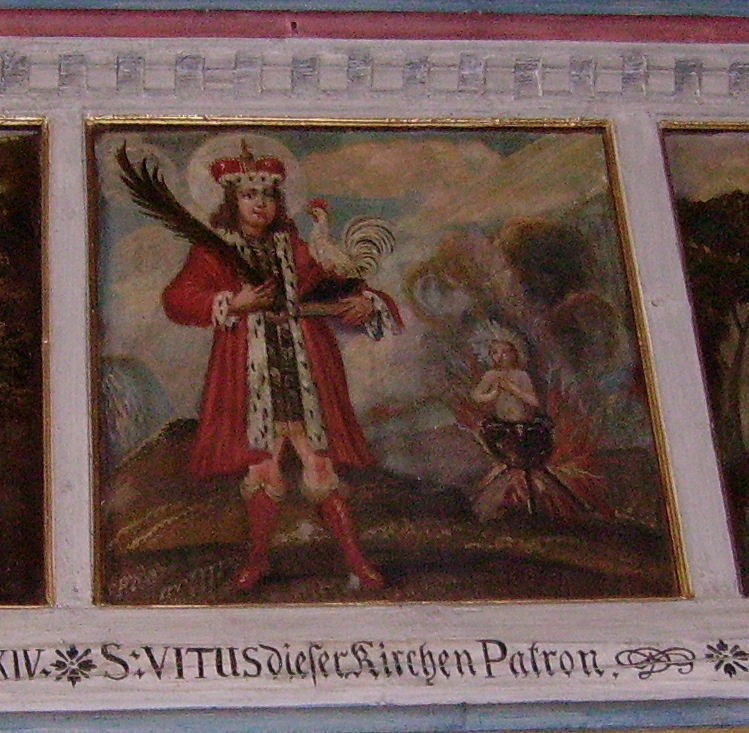
An image of Saint Vitus in Heiligenstadt, Franconia

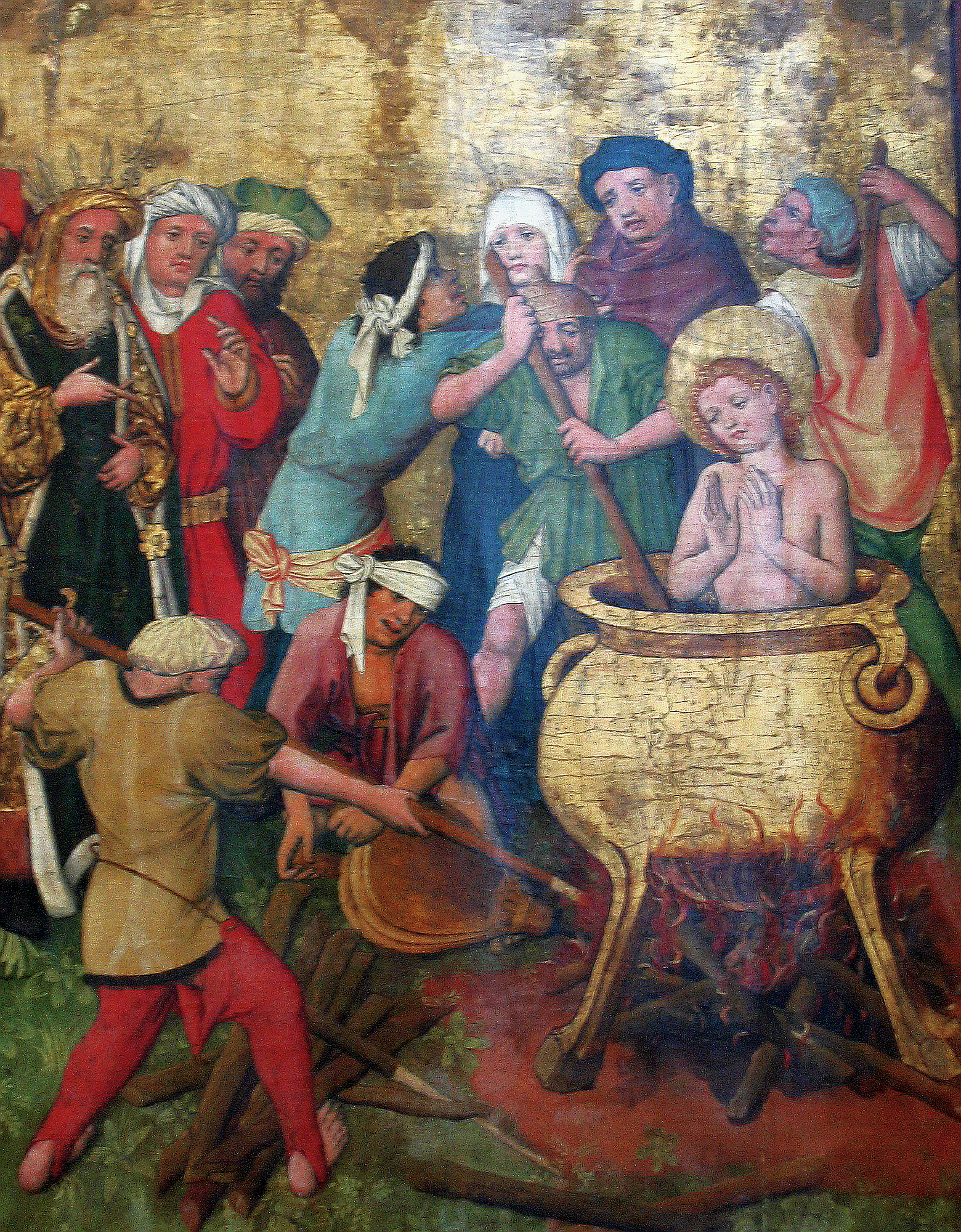
Martyrdom of Saint Vitus, Germany circa 1450, National Museum in Warsaw

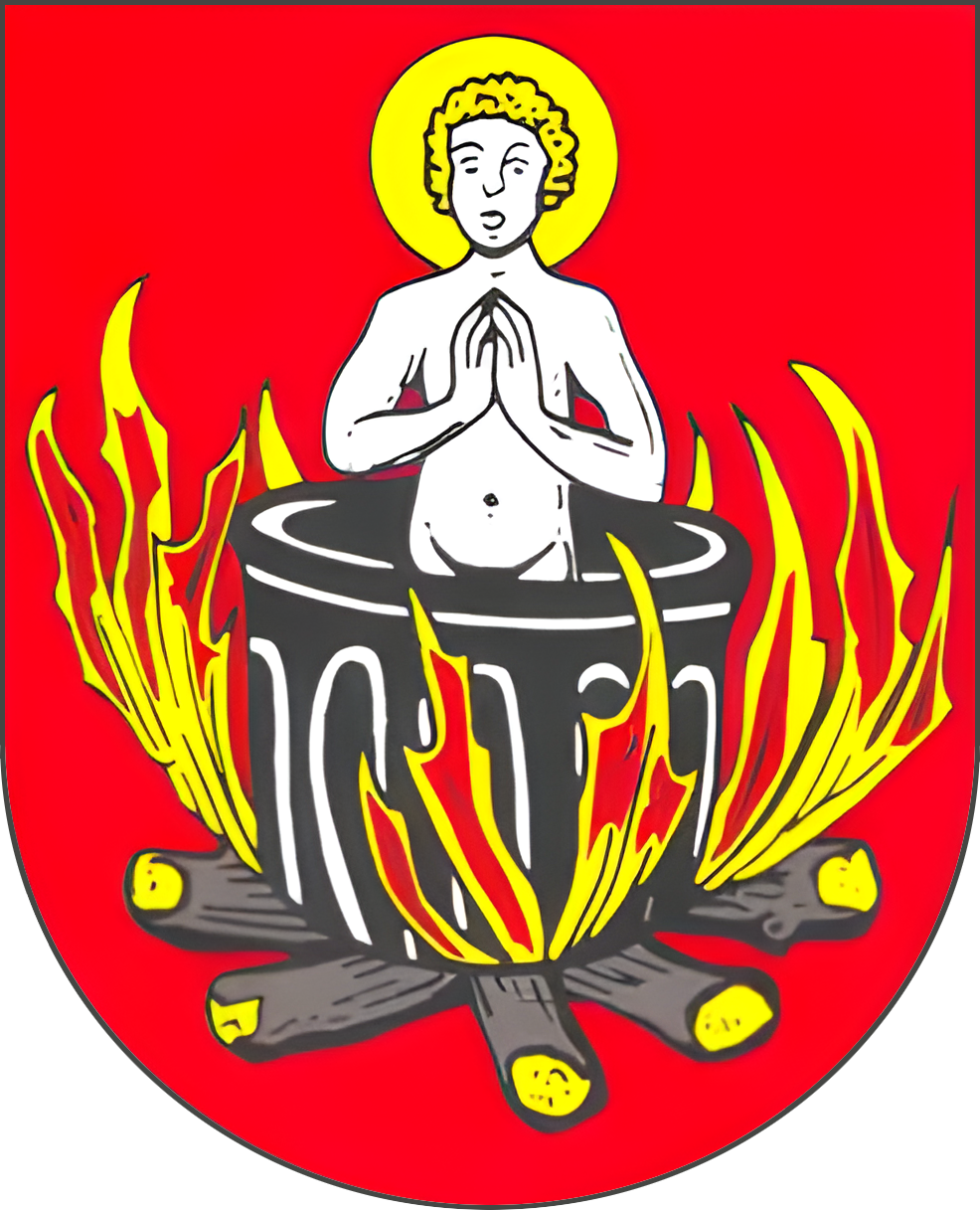
Martyrdom of Saint Vitus/Sankt Veit on the coat of arms of Sankt Veit im Pongau, Austria

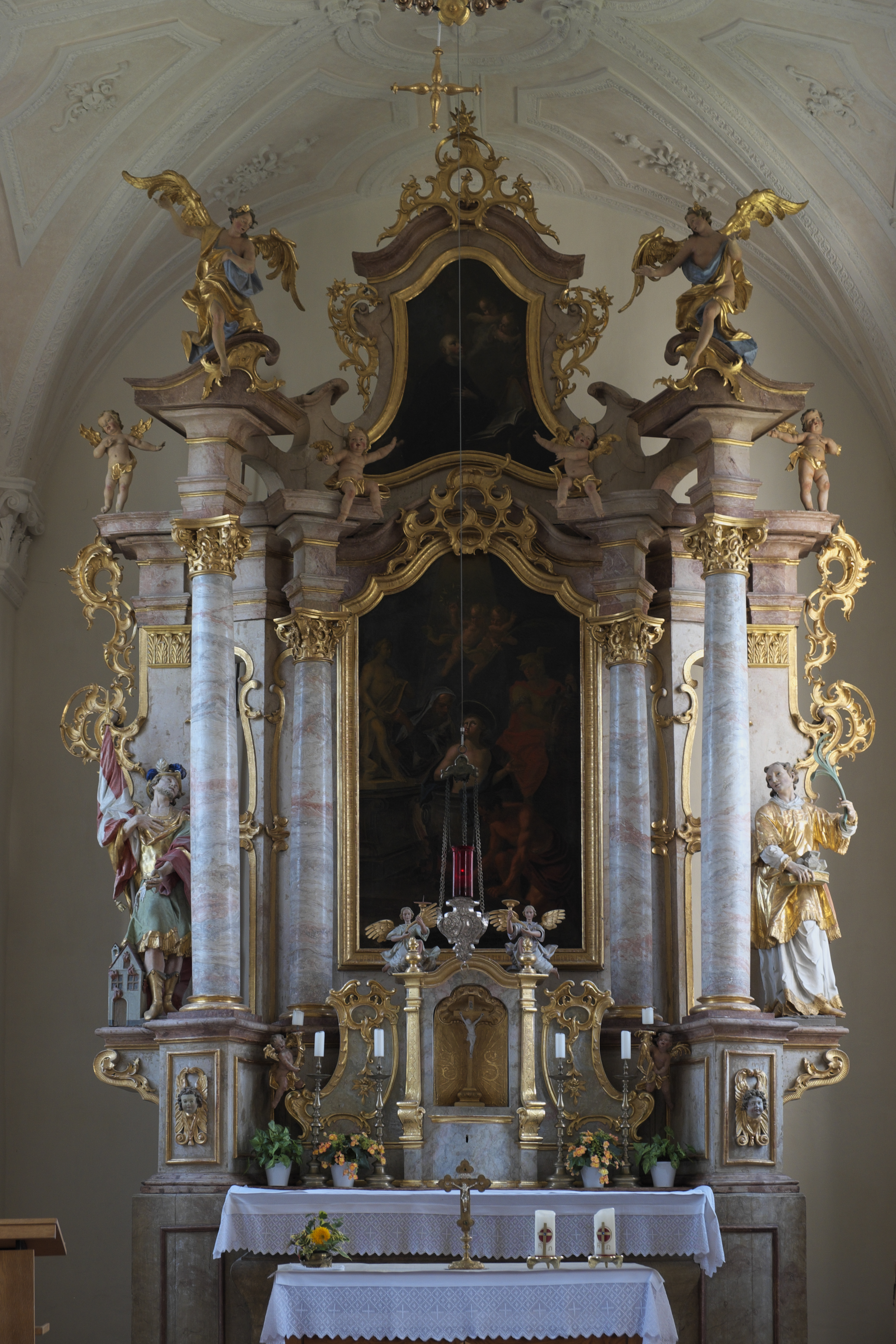
High altar of Saint Vitus in Fraunberg, Bavaria, c. 1770

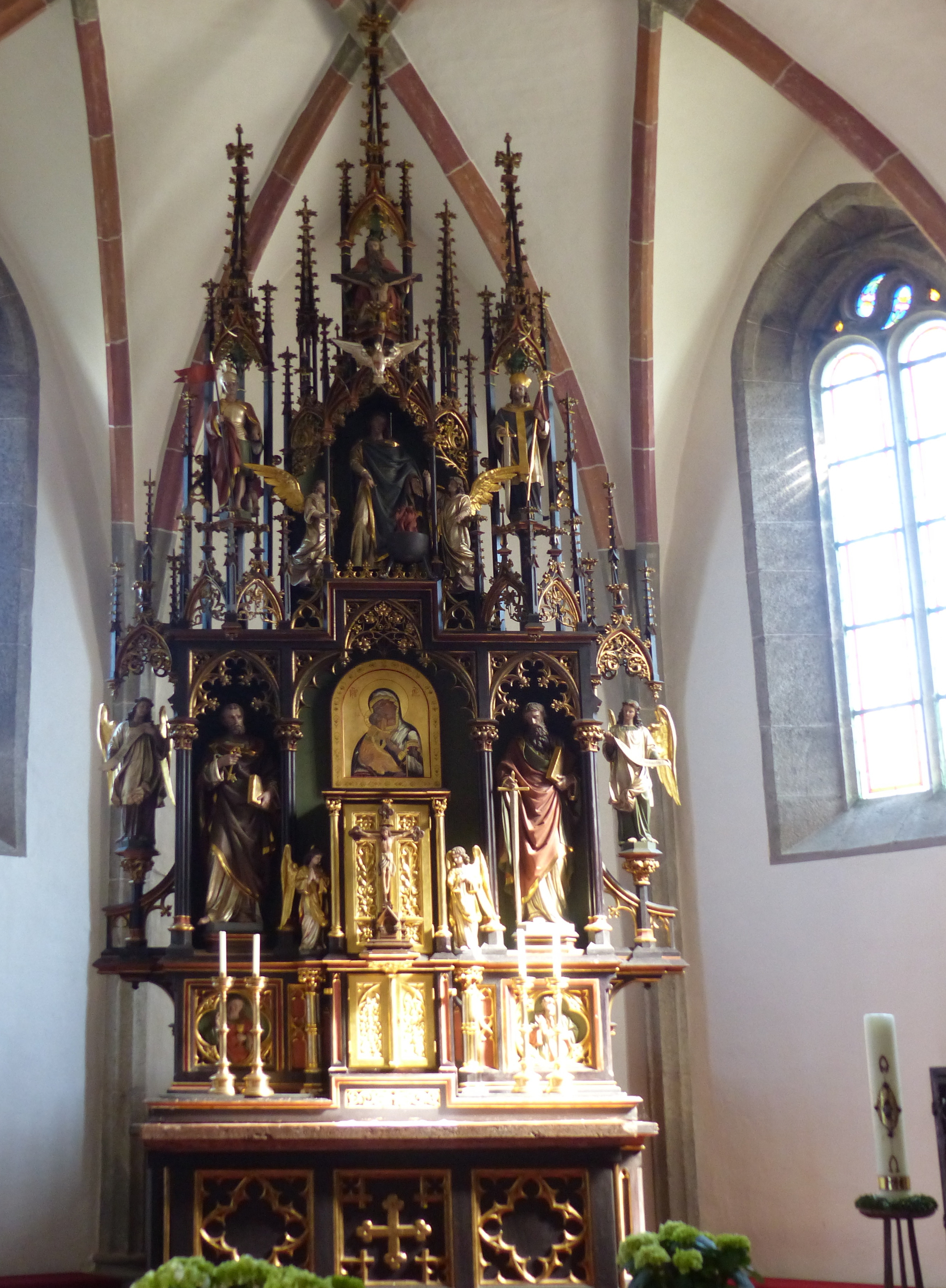
Gothic Revival high altar (1911) at the Saint Vitus Parish Church in Pfarrkirchen im Mühlkreis, Upper Austria, by Ludwig Linzinger

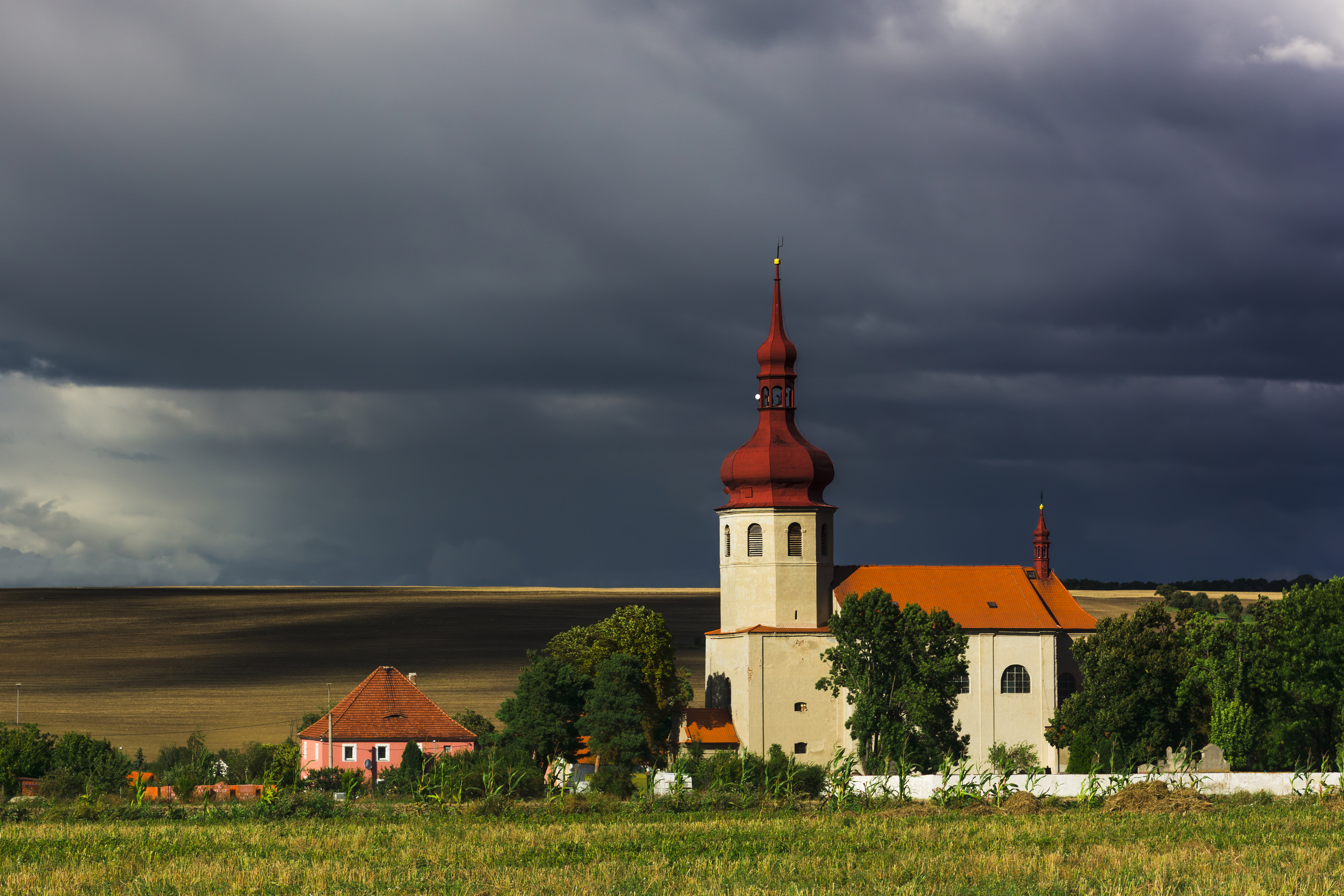
Church of Saint Vitus, Libědice, Czech Republic

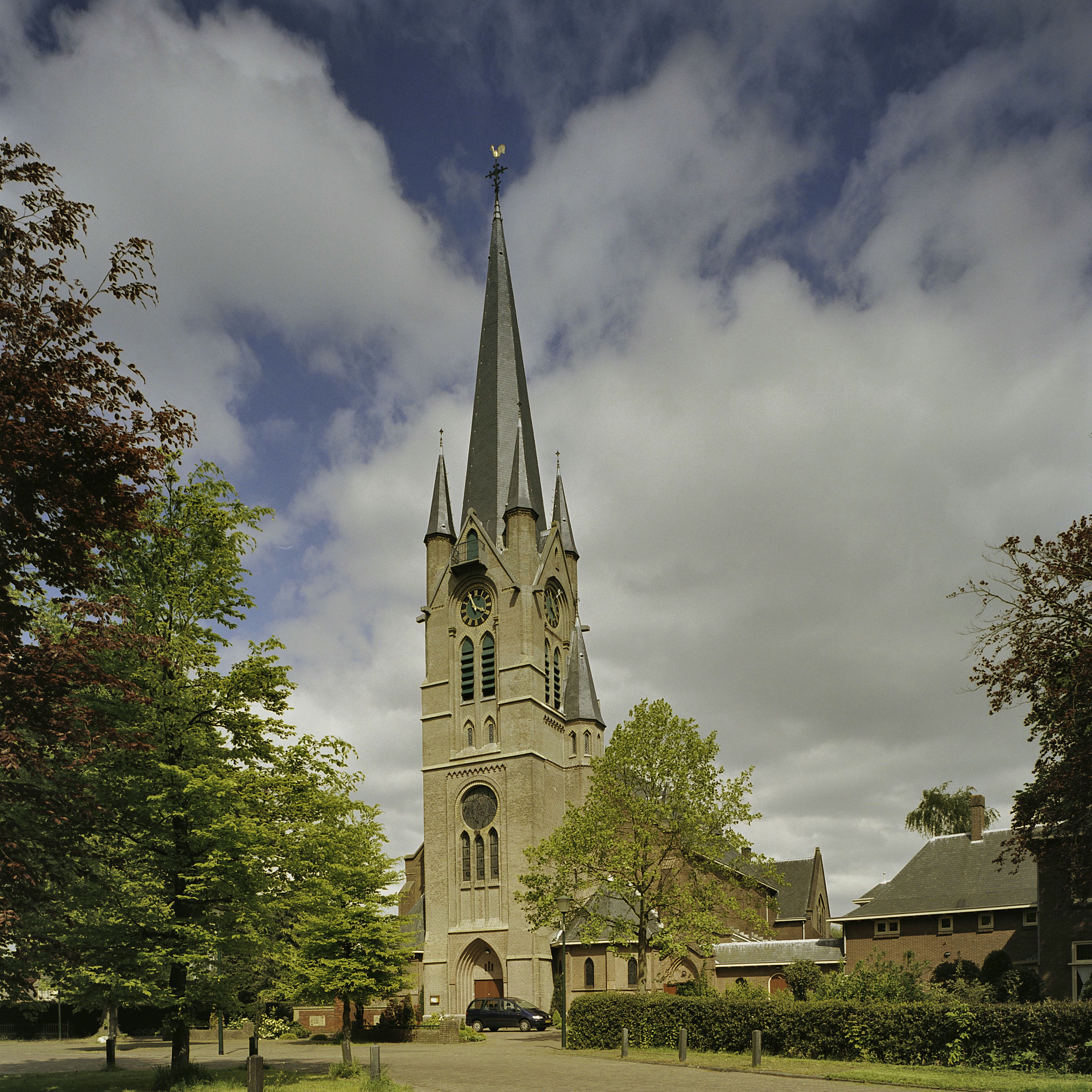
Church of Saint Vitus, Blaricum, Netherlands

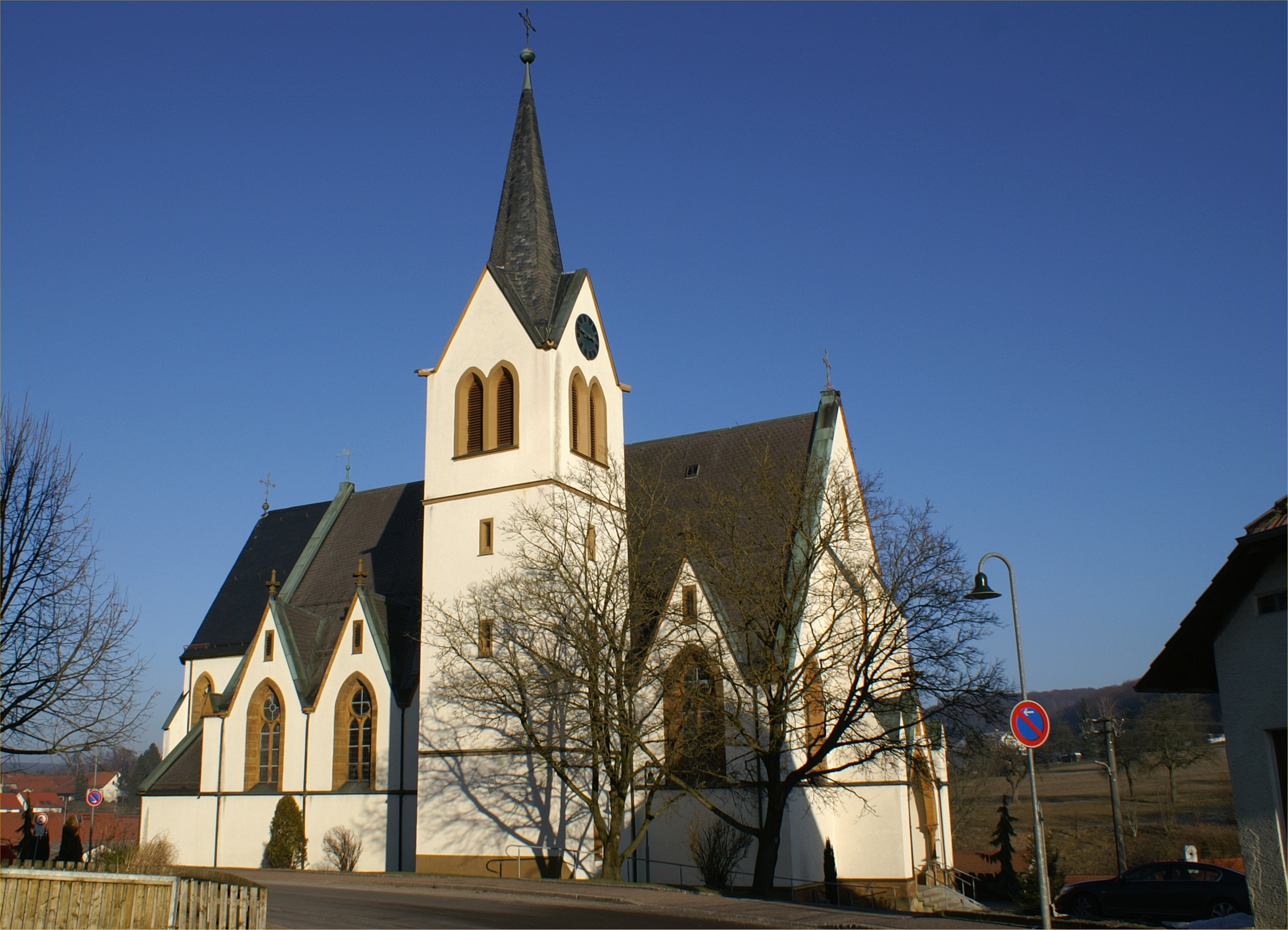
Church of Saint Vitus, Treffelhausen, Baden-Württemberg, Germany

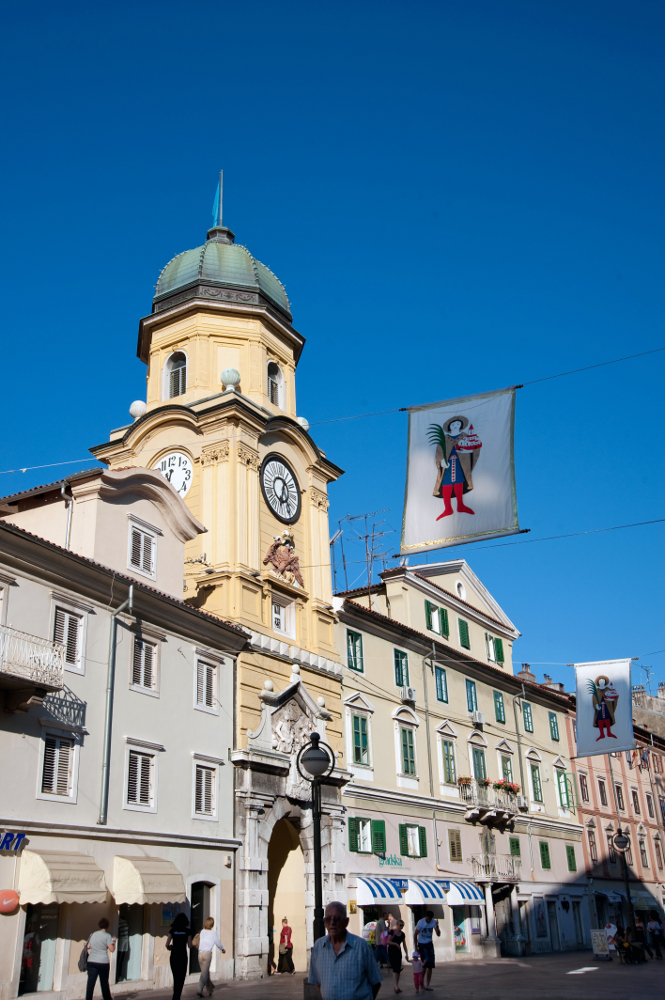
Banners celebrating the feast of St. Vitus in Rijeka, Croatia

== See also ==
- List of early Christian saints
- Saint Vitus, patron saint archive
- Statue of Vitus, Charles Bridge
- Dancing mania
- The Dancing mania

== Sources ==
- Delehaye, Hippolyte (1911). "Vitus, St" . Encyclopædia Britannica. Vol. 28 (11th ed.). p. 152.
