= Iranian schoolgirls mass poisoning =

Alleged serial poisoning occurrence in Iran

The Iranian schoolgirls mass poisoning incident was a series of chemical attacks on students in dozens of schools across Iran. It began in November 2022, at the Isfahan University of Technology, with reports of thousands of students being poisoned in the following months. The scientific committee of the Ministry of Health of Iran believes a "primarily inhaled stimulant" was used in these poisonings. Iran's Supreme Leader Ali Khamenei demanded severe punishment for the perpetrators. Amnesty International accused the Islamic Republic of seeking to punish schoolgirls for refusing to wear the mandatory hijab. Mass psychogenic illness (MPI) was cited as one explanation, while others claimed the Iranian government was targeting the girls for removing their mandatory hijab.

Researchers, human-rights groups and some governments asked for an independent investigation to determine the exact cause of the incidents.

Iranian health authorities initially said that the vast majority of reported attacks were due to stress, anxiety, and other psychological factors. However, in early March, the government of Iran announced that more than 100 arrests had been made in connection with the incidents. On 29 April 2023, the Iranian Intelligence Ministry concluded that the reported illnesses were not caused by toxic substances but by mass hysteria, and malingering. Some independent organizations expressed skepticism of these claims.

== Proposed explanations ==
Speculation about possible perpetrators includes: the Iranian government, seeking revenge for the protests against compulsory hijab which intensified following to the death of Mahsa Amini; Iranian hardliners who want to emulate Afghanistan's Taliban; or a militant Islamist group similar to Nigeria's Boko Haram, who tried to stop parents from sending their girls to school. Several officials have suggested that foreign "enemies" of the Islamic Republic may have launched attacks to denigrate it.

Robert Bartholomew suggested that the people affected may have been suffering from "mass psychogenic illness". He drew a parallel between the reported poisonings in Iran and those recorded in Afghanistan from 2009 to 2016, as well as the 1983 West Bank fainting epidemic. In all of these cases young Muslim girls fell ill from a mystery condition that was attributed to poison gas after someone drew attention to an unusual odor. With respect to the Afghanistan case, other studies have also concluded that the affected girls, who were attending schools in defiance of the Taliban, were suffering from mass psychogenic illness.

Simon Wessely of King's College indicated that key epidemiological factors point to this being a case of mass psychogenic illness. Some factors mentioned were: how cases spread across Iran; the fact predominantly only young people of a single gender reported problems; and the quick recovery of most people affected.

Dan Kaszeta, chemical weapons expert at the Royal United Services Institute, said that the incidents have similarities with a series of unproven poisonings in Afghan schools in the 2010s. Alastair Hay, professor of environmental toxicology at the University of Leeds, reviewed blood tests results from Iranian girls suspected of being poisoned, and found no evidence of toxins. Kaszeta and Hay also told Nature.com that they have not ruled out that the Iranian situation is yet another episode of mass psychogenic illness. John Drury, a psychologist at the University of Sussex, told Nature.com that previous poison scares "led to symptoms such as nausea, fainting, and hyperventilation" and that "it is hard to distinguish between psychogenic effects and exposure to actual hazards."

On an interview on Voice of America's Persian service, Sina Foroutannejad a chemical expert at the Polish Academy of Sciences said after reviewing reports from affected children he had concluded that the chemical agent could not be home made. Rather, from reports of students' symptoms, such as experiencing paralysis and one report of a student developing diabetes-like symptoms, he has concluded that the chemical agent is likely an organophosphate compound. Foroutannejad said that a combination of the symptoms and reports of students noticing a fruit-like smell suggest the poison used could be soman.

== Speculation about type of poisoning ==
In February 2023, Alireza Monadi, the head of the Education, Research and Technology Commission of the Islamic Consultative Assembly, announced that nitrogen gas (N_{2}) was detected in the poison used at some of the schools. While nitrogen gas (which makes up the majority of the atmosphere) was originally claimed by the Iranian government as the cause of the poisonings, Morteza Khatami, Vice-Chairman of the Parliament's Health and Treatment Commission, later stated in March 2023 that "(N_{2}) gas does not explain the symptoms and clinical manifestations, but other gases have symptoms that justify the numbness of the body."

In early March 2023, chemical weapons expert Dan Kaszeta said it will be difficult to find reliable evidence of any type of poison used, due to toxic substances commonly degrading before any reasonable opportunity to collect a sample at the scene. Kaszeta also said that biomedical tests, such as blood and urine screening, "could indicate a type of poison used, but are complicated by a number of possible alternative culprits".

== Iranian government reactions ==
Iranian minister of interior speaking about the poison attacks

Positions by government officials on the alleged poisonings have changed over time. Officials have changed their stance from initially dismissing the incidents to acknowledging the scope of the crisis.

In late February, Bahram Eynollahi, the Minister of Health, claimed that a "mild poison" was used against female students in Iranian schools. According to IRNA, the parliament’s speaker, Mohammad Bagher Ghalibaf, said that both Qom and Borujerd were "dealing with student poisonings". The deputy health minister of Iran, Younes Panahi, said the aim of the poisonings was to shut down education for girls. He was quoted as saying "After the poisoning of several students in Qom schools, it was found that some people wanted all schools, especially girls’ schools, to be closed".

He soon "walked back his comments", and claimed that "in around 90 percent of the cases symptoms were caused by stress and anxiety when other students fell ill or caused by media reports of the poisonings"; and that “irritant substances” were used in the attacks, but these affected less than 10% percent of students." He went on to say the suspected substance were not weapons grade or deadly. He also said that 90% of cases were caused either by anxiety when others became sick, or by learning of other poisonings from media."

On 7 March, Yousef Nouri, the Iranian minister of education, said that "95% of the girls going to hospitals or medical centres had no medical problem – only fear and worry – while a few had underlying diseases." Several days earlier, Iranian president Ebrahim Raisi ordered that the series of incidents at some 30 schools since November be investigated. On 3 March, Raisi publicly blamed "Iran's enemies" during a live state TV speech for the attacks, although no country was specifically mentioned, saying "This is a security project to cause chaos in the country whereby the enemy seeks to instill fear and insecurity among parents and students".

On that same day, the government of Iran reported for the first time that an undisclosed number of suspects had been arrested in relation to the alleged poisonings. Ali Khamenei, the Supreme Leader of the Islamic Republic of Iran, said that if it is proven that the students were poisoned, "those behind this crime should be sentenced to capital punishment and there will be no amnesty for them."

On 10 March 2023, Iran's legal authorities announced that agents responsible for the poisoning were identified and arrested in several cities. Iranian TV aired some confessions, however, the BBC noted that Iran TV has often aired forced confessions of people obtained by torture, and the confessed details were later determined to be false."

On 29 April 2023, the Iranian Intelligence Ministry released the findings of a comprehensive investigation and reported that "Toxic substances have not been distributed in any of the nation’s schools, but non-toxic agents that have caused panic have been used accidentally or purposefully in some reported settings." It stated that the non-toxic substances included stink bombs, pepper spray, and other odorous agents. The Ministry said that malingering was "one of the proven causes of the occurrences, with the goal of fun, skipping lectures and examinations, and, in a few cases, fomenting unrest and riots". It stated that "there hasn’t been a network in the nation for the distribution of poisonous substances," but there are "many cyber networks both inside and outside the country that create and spread rumors to cause school closures, elicit protests from parents of students, and purposefully accuse the Islamic establishment."

== Reporting by non-Iranian state entities ==
On 2 March, the White House said that the Biden administration "does not know what is causing the apparent poisoning of schoolgirls in Iran." It also called for "a thorough and transparent investigation" to be conducted by the government there. The National Security Council spokesman said "...we don't know right now what caused those ailments. We see reports that the Iranian government are investigating it, that's the right course of action." However, he wouldn't commit to the U.S. government accepting Iranian investigation results as the truth.

The United States Institute of Peace, an American federal institution tasked with promoting conflict resolution and prevention worldwide, has monitored the reports from Iran and summarized them on its website.

On 1 March 2023, France 24 reported that as of that date just a single death had been reported in Iran due to the alleged poisonings across the country. That was an 11-year-old girl, Fatemeh Rezaei, whom activists claimed died after being poisoned at her school. Iranian authorities have denied this. Aljazira reported that Rezaei's death was linked to the poisonings by foreign media, but that her doctor said on Iranian state television that her death was due to an infection and not poisoning.

On 3 March 2023, as reported by Radio Free Europe, Annalena Baerbock, the German foreign minister, expressed outrage about the claimed poisonings and called for a full investigation, Tweeting "Girls must be able to go to school without fear."

On 8 March 2023, VOA News on Iran reported that Reporters Without Borders (RFS) had urged Iran to release a journalist who had been arrested and who had covered the poisoning reports. RFS claimed Ali Pourtabatabaei was arrested to silence him. The head of RSF’s Middle East desk also said about 30 journalists and other media employees had been arrested by the government, most during the crackdown on the protest movement.

On 10 March 2023, Al Arabiya reported on the state television airing the confessions of poisoning suspects, saying that "Iranian state media commonly air such reports", and that "the practice is condemned by rights groups who say the confessions are often forced and extracted through torture."

On 15 March, ABC News reported that Gen. Saeed Montazerolmehdi, the Iranian police spokesperson, claimed that as of that date, 110 suspects had been arrested in connection with the suspected poisonings. But the ABC report also revealed that "the World Health Organization documented what might have been a similar phenomenon in Afghanistan from 2009 to 2012, when hundreds of girls across the country complained of strange smells and poisoning. No evidence was found to support the suspicions, and WHO said it appeared to be a 'mass psychogenic illness.'" On the same date, CBS News reported on the arrests, adding "Unlike neighboring Afghanistan, Iran has no history of religious extremists targeting women's education, even during the height of its 1979 Islamic Revolution. There have been no reported fatalities linked to the schoolgirl poisonings, and some officials have suggested that mass hysteria might have played a role."

On 19 March 2023, The Jerusalem Post disputed the mass psychogenic explanation for the reports and said "If the illness of Iranian schoolgirls is not caused by 'mass sociogenic illness,' then it raises a fundamental question about the underlying reason for these incidents." It also said if the government is responsible then the, "...Islamic regime must be penalized because the utilization of chemical agents is a blatant violation of human rights and goes against international law."

On 26 April 2023, The Washington Post reported that panic was spreading in Iran in April following new suspected poison attacks on girls schools, claiming that "Two weeks ago, a 65-year-old man took his elderly mother to a hospital in the northeast city of Mashhad and found the lobby filled with about a dozen schoolgirls who he said were coughing and panting. He filmed the scene on his phone and shared the video with The Post."

On 2 May 2023, the Atlantic Council reported on the controversy surrounding whether or not the claimed symptoms were due to poisonings or mass psychogenic illness, and concluded that "Due to a lack of an independent investigation, many questions about these attacks remain unanswered." The article concluded "the international community must take decisive and expeditious measures to ensure accountability and safeguard the human rights of Iranian citizens, especially women and girls. Further passivity by international organizations conveys the message that hardliners and extremists in Iran will not face any consequences on the international stage, regardless of how heinous their actions might be."

== Timeline of reports ==
In the first three months of the attacks, no solid information was uncovered about the type of poison gas that may have been used. Complaints have included nausea, vomiting, cough, shortness of breath, heart palpitations and feeling lethargic. Some also reported that they smelled a tangerine-like smell.

=== November 2022 ===
- On an unspecified date in November: "Some students" from Isfahan University of Technology reported to a clinic with symptoms which included heartburn, diarrhea, and vomiting. According to the university’s president, initially 270 students showed symptoms, but eventually some 600 were affected.
- 30 November: 18 students at the Noor Girls’ Conservatory in Yazdanshahr, Qom, reported symptoms of shortness of breath and numbness in the arms and legs.

=== December 2022 ===
- 1 December: The country’s students’ trade union council said that a large number of students of Kharazmi University of Karaj suffered symptoms due to food poisoning from the night before. The chief justice of Alborz province stated that 160 students were affected. According to the ISNA news agency, in less than 10 days, more than 1,200 students (from various schools) "went to medical centers with symptoms such as nausea, vomiting, heartache and dizziness".
- 13 December (22 Azar): Again at the Noor Girls’ Conservatory in Yazdanshahr, Qom, 51 female students reported symptoms and went to the hospital. Public Relations of Qom Education announced that experts were investigating the cause.

=== February 2023 ===
- February 27: Iran International published a photograph allegedly showing hospitalized schoolgirl victims. The same article also shared a video Tweet claiming to show the aftermath of a gas attack at Omar Khayyam High School in Pardis.

=== March 2023 ===
- 7 March: The Guardian reported that the count of affected students stood at 7,068 in at least 103 schools from 99 cities, and that the record for daily attacks stood at 81.
- 12 March: Time.com reported on the arrests and also pointed out the confusion regarding the number of students who claimed illness, stating that an Iranian lawmaker investigating the attacks said that "some 5,000 students had become sick because of the poisonings," yet Iranian media reports a count closer to 1,000.

== See also ==
- Mahsa Amini protests
