= Baruch Modan =

Israeli medical scientist (1932–2001)

- ברוך מודן
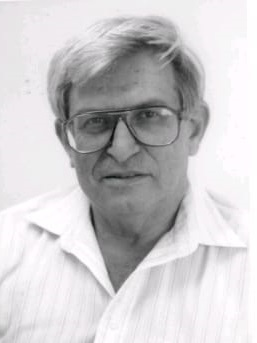
- Born: 1932
- Died: 2001 (aged 68–69)
- Known for: Research on cancer and radiation effects
- Children: Rutu Modan
- Scientific career
- Fields: Oncology, Epidemiology
- Institutions: University of Tel Aviv, Israeli Ministry of Health

Prof. Baruch Modan (Hebrew: ברוך מודן) (1932-2001) was an Israeli medical scientist. Modan made significant findings in the field of oncology and was an expert on the effects of radiation.

Modan worked with various types of cancer, and in 1974 demonstrated that the chances of getting breast cancer increase for anyone who has had X-ray dosages as low as 1.6 rem. He was an expert on treating cancer among children.

A professor at the University of Tel Aviv, Prof. Modan was Chairman of the Department of Epidemiology and Head of the Stanley Steyer Institute for Cancer Epidemiology and Research at the Sackler Faculty of Medicine. He was also Director-General of the Israeli Ministry of Health.

He was the father of Rutu Modan.
