= Kashasha =

Ward in Muleba, Kagera, Tanzania

Kashasha Kata ya Kashasha
- Ward
- Location within Tanzania Location within Africa
- Coordinates: 1°45′28″S 31°36′57″E
- Country: Tanzania
- Region: Kagera Region
- District: Muleba District
- Ward: Kashasha

Population (2016)
  - Total: 12,508
- Time zone: UTC+3 (EAT)
- Postcode: 35524

Kashasha is a ward on the western coast of Lake Victoria in the Muleba District of the Kagera Region, Tanzania, near the border of Uganda. The village is known for having been the locus of the Tanganyika laughter epidemic of 1962.

In 2016 the Tanzania National Bureau of Statistics report there were 12,508 people in the ward, from 11,021 in 2012.

== Villages ==
The ward has 14 villages.

- Rubya
- Kashenshero
- Kitarabwa
- Omukitenge
- Kifo
- Kiiga
- Buhanama
- Bukijungu
- Nyaruhanga
- Bukambiro
- Nyakashunshu
- Rwabona
- Kigabiro
- Kanyambogo
