= Justus Hecker =

German physician and medical writer

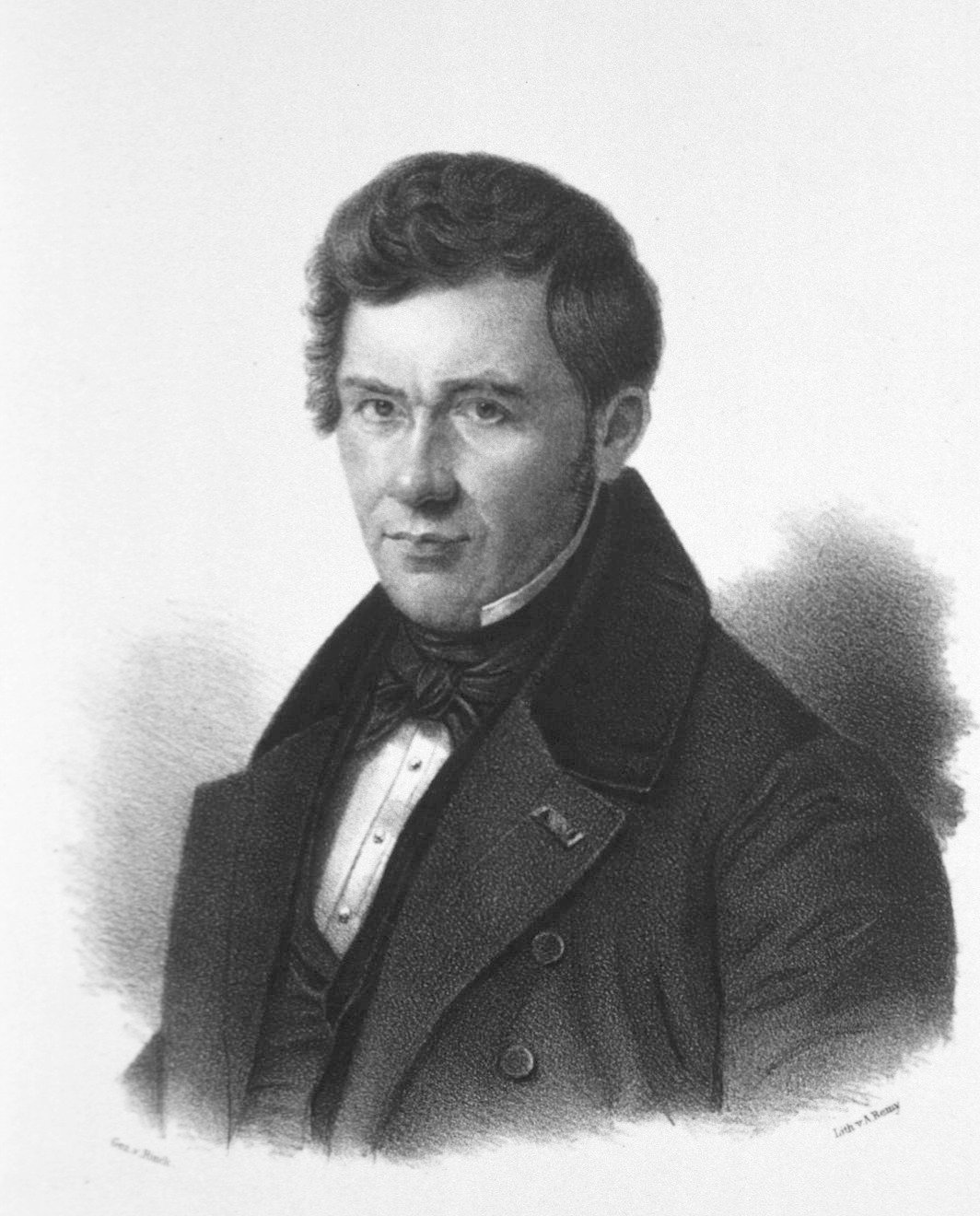
Justus Hecker

Justus Friedrich Karl Hecker (5 January 1795, in Erfurt – 11 May 1850, in Berlin) was a German medical doctor and medical writer, whose works appear in medical encyclopaedias and journals of the time. He particularly studied disease in relation to human history, including plague, smallpox, infant mortality, dancing mania and the sweating sickness, and is often said to have founded the study of the history of disease.

== Life ==
His father August Friedrich Hecker (1763–1811) was also a physician. In 1805, when Justus was 10, the family moved from Justus's birthplace of Erfurt to Berlin, and Justus later studied medicine at the University of Berlin, graduating in 1817 and becoming a Privatdozent and then (in 1822) Extraordinary Professor. In 1834, he became the university's "ordinary professor" for the History of Medicine. He also cooperated with the professors of the "Medical Faculty of Berlin" on the encyclopaedic dictionary of the medical sciences.

== Selected works ==
- Geschichte der Heilkunde. Nach den Quellen bearbeitet. 2 in 1 Bd. Berlin: Enslin, 1822–1829 (History of Medicine, produced from the sources, from 2000 BC to the downfall of the Byzantine Empire in 1453)
- Die Tanzwuth, eine Volkskrankheit im Mittelalter: nach den Quellen für Aerzte und gebildete Nichtärzte bearbeitet. (The Dancing Mania, an epidemic of the Middle Ages: from the sources by physicians and non-physicians) Berlin: Enslin, 1832
- Der schwarze Tod im vierzehnten Jahrhundert: Nach den Quellen für Ärzte und gebildete Nichtärzte bearbeitet. (The Black Death in the 14th century: from the sources by physicians and non-physicians) Berlin: Herbig, 1832
- Ueber die Volkskrankheiten. Eine Rede. (On Epidemics: A Speech) Berlin: Enslin, 1832
- Der englische Schweiss. Ein ärztlicher Beitrag zur Geschichte des fünfzehnten und sechszehnten Jahrhunderts. (The Sweating Sickness: A medical contribution to the story of the fifteenth and six tenth century.) Berlin 1834
- Kinderfahrten : eine historisch-pathologische Skizze. (Infant-Mortality: A Historical-Pathological Sketch) Berlin: Schade, 1845
- Ueber Visionen : Eine Vorlesung gehalten im wissenschaftlichen Verein zu Berlin am 29. Januar 1848. (On visions: A lecture in Berlin to the Berlin scientific society on 29 January 1848) Berlin: Enslin, 1848
- Die großen Volkskrankheiten des Mittelalters. Historisch-pathologische Untersuchungen. Gesammelt und in erweiterter Bearbeitung herausgegeben von Dr. August Hirsch. (Great Plagues of the Middle Ages. Historical-pathological investigations. Gathered and published, expanded by Dr. August Hirsch) Berlin: Verlag Theodor Christian Friedrich Enslin 1865.

== Sources ==
- A. Hirsch, 'Justus Hecker' in: Allgemeine Deutsche Biographie, Band 11
