= Dancing mania =

Medieval social phenomena

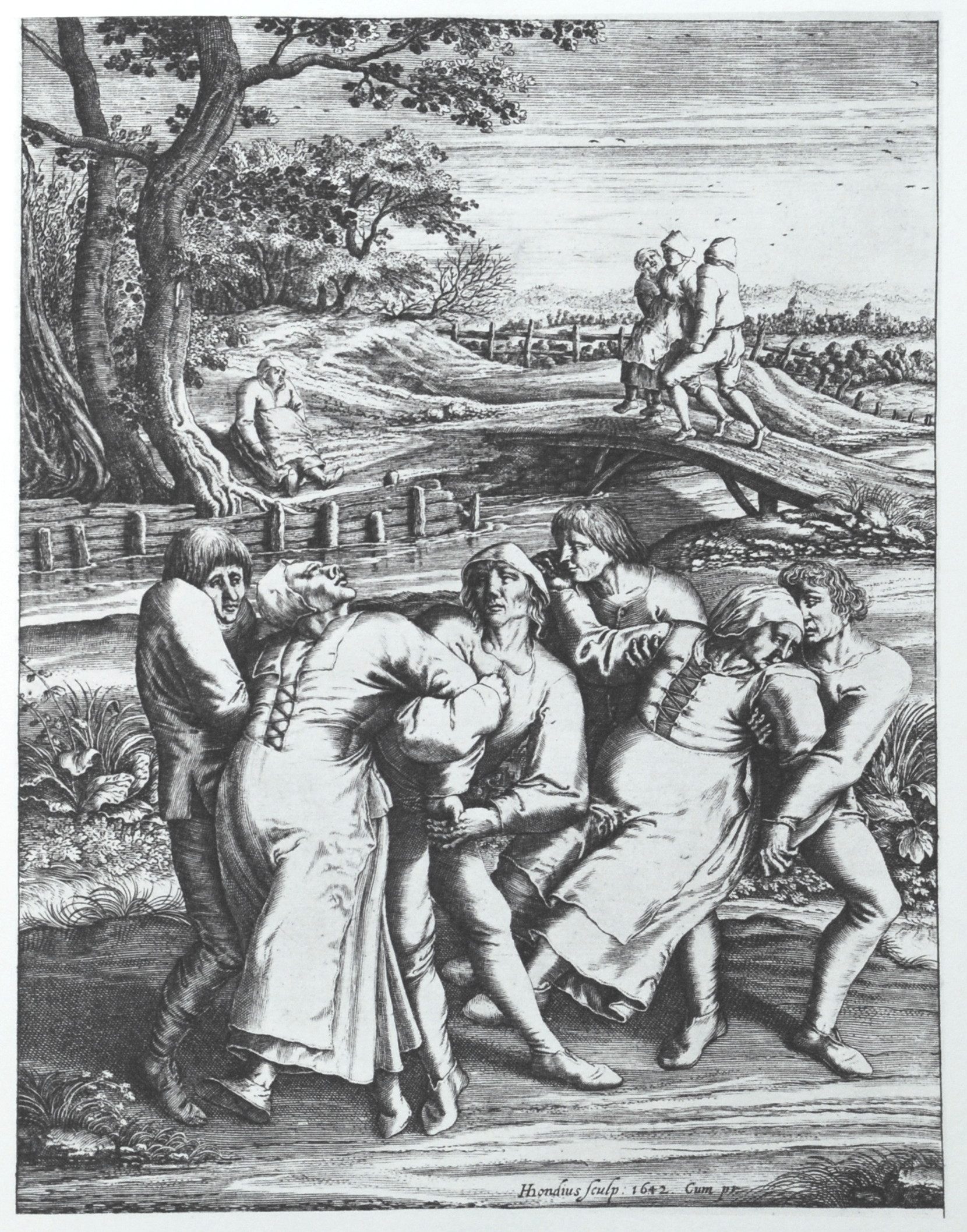
Dancing mania on a pilgrimage to the church at Sint-Jans-Molenbeek, a 1642 engraving by Hendrick Hondius after a 1564 drawing by Pieter Brueghel the Elder

Dancing mania (also known as dancing plague, choreomania, St. John's Dance, tarantism and St. Vitus' Dance) was a phenomenon which occurred primarily in mainland Europe between the 14th and 17th centuries. It involved groups of people dancing erratically, sometimes thousands at a time. The mania affected adults and children who danced until, allegedly, they collapsed from exhaustion and injuries, and sometimes died. One of the first major outbreaks was in Aachen, in the Holy Roman Empire (within modern-day Germany), in 1374, and it quickly spread throughout Europe; one particularly notable outbreak occurred in Strasbourg in 1518 in Alsace, also in the Holy Roman Empire (within modern-day France).

Affecting thousands of people across several centuries, dancing mania was not an isolated event, and was well documented in contemporary reports. It was nevertheless poorly understood, and remedies were based on guesswork. Often musicians accompanied dancers, due to a belief that music would treat the mania, but this tactic sometimes backfired by encouraging more to join in. There is no consensus among modern-day scholars as to the cause of dancing mania. The several theories proposed range from religious cults being behind the processions to people dancing to relieve themselves of stress and put the poverty of the period out of their minds. It is speculated to have been a mass psychogenic illness, in which physical symptoms with no known physical cause are observed to affect a group of people, as a form of social influence.

== Definition ==
"Dancing mania" is derived from the term "choreomania", from the Greek choros (dancing) and mania (madness), and is also known as "dancing plague". The term was coined by Paracelsus, and the condition was initially considered a curse sent by a saint, usually St. John the Baptist or St. Vitus, and was therefore known as "St. Vitus' Dance" or "St. John's Dance". Victims of dancing mania often ended their processions at places dedicated to that saint, who was prayed to in an effort to end the dancing; incidents often broke out around the time of the feast of St. Vitus.

St. Vitus' Dance was diagnosed, in the 17th century, as Sydenham's chorea. Dancing mania has also been known as epidemic chorea and epidemic dancing. A disease of the nervous system, chorea is characterized by symptoms resembling those of dancing mania, which has also rather unconvincingly been considered a form of epilepsy.

Other scientists have described dancing mania as a "collective mental disorder", "collective hysterical disorder" and "mass madness".

== Outbreaks ==
The earliest-known outbreak of dancing mania occurred in the 7th century. One of the earliest-known incidents occurred sometime in the 1020s in Bernburg, where 18 peasants began singing and dancing around a church, disturbing a Christmas Eve service.

Further outbreaks occurred during the 13th century, including one in 1237 in which a large group of children travelled from Erfurt to Arnstadt (about 20 km (12 mi)), jumping and dancing all the way, in marked similarity to the legend of the Pied Piper of Hamelin, a legend that originated around the same time. Another incident, in 1278, involved about 200 people dancing on a bridge over the River Meuse resulting in its collapse. Many of the survivors were restored to full health at a nearby chapel dedicated to St. Vitus. The first major outbreak of the mania occurred between 1373 and 1374, with incidents reported in England, Germany and the Netherlands.

On 24 June 1374, one of the biggest outbreaks began in Aachen, before spreading to other places such as Cologne, Flanders, Franconia, Hainaut, Metz, Strasbourg, Tongeren, Utrecht, and regions and countries such as Italy and the Duchy of Luxemburg. Further episodes occurred in 1375 and 1376, with incidents in France, Germany, and the Netherlands, and in 1381, there was an outbreak in Augsburg. Further incidents occurred in 1418 in Strasbourg, where people fasted for days and the outbreak was possibly caused by exhaustion. In another outbreak, in 1428 in Schaffhausen, a monk danced to death and, in the same year, a group of women in Zürich were reportedly in a dancing frenzy.

Another of the most extensive outbreaks occurred in July 1518, in Strasbourg (see Dancing plague of 1518), where a woman began dancing in the street, and between 50–400 people joined her. Further incidents occurred during the 16th century when the mania was at its peak: in 1536 in Basel, involving a group of children; and in 1551 in Anhalt, involving just one man. In the 17th century, incidents of recurrent dancing were recorded by professor of medicine Gregor Horst, who noted:

Several women who annually visit the chapel of Saint Vitus in Drefelhausen ... dance madly all day and all night until they collapse in ecstasy. In this way they come to themselves again and feel little or nothing until the next May, when they are again ... forced around Saint Vitus' Day to betake themselves to that place ... [o]ne of these women is said to have danced every year for the past twenty years, another for a full thirty-two.

According to John Waller, although numerous incidents were recorded, the best documented cases are the outbreaks of 1374 and 1518, for which there is abundant contemporary evidence.

== Characteristics ==
The outbreaks of dancing mania varied, and several characteristics of it have been recorded. Generally occurring in times of hardship, up to tens of thousands of people would appear to dance for hours, days, weeks, and even months.

Women have often been portrayed in modern literature as the usual participants in dancing mania, although contemporary sources suggest otherwise. Whether the dancing was spontaneous, or an organized event, is also debated. What is certain, however, is that dancers seemed to be in a state of unconsciousness and unable to control themselves.

In his research into social phenomena, author Robert Bartholomew notes that contemporary sources record that participants often did not reside where the dancing took place. Such people would travel from place to place, and others would join them along the way. With them they brought customs and behaviour that were strange to the local people. Bartholomew describes how dancers wore "strange, colorful attire" and "held wooden sticks".

Robert Marks, in his study of hypnotism, notes that some decorated their hair with garlands. However, not all outbreaks involved foreigners, and not all were particularly calm. Bartholomew notes that some "paraded around naked" and made "obscene gestures". Some even had sexual intercourse. Others acted like animals, and jumped, hopped, and leapt about.

They hardly stopped, and some danced until they broke their ribs and subsequently died. Throughout, dancers screamed, laughed, or cried, and some sang. Bartholomew also notes that observers of dancing mania were sometimes treated violently if they refused to join in. Participants demonstrated odd reactions to the color red; in A History of Madness in Sixteenth-Century Germany, Midelfort writes that they "could not perceive the color red at all", and Bartholomew reports "it was said that dancers could not stand ... the color red, often becoming violent on seeing it".

Bartholomew also notes that dancers "could not stand pointed shoes", and that dancers enjoyed their feet being hit. Throughout, those affected by dancing mania suffered from a variety of ailments, including chest pains, convulsions, hallucinations, hyperventilation, epileptic fits, and visions. In the end, most simply dropped down, overwhelmed with exhaustion. Midelfort, however, describes how some ended up in a state of ecstasy. Typically, the mania was contagious but it often struck small groups, such as families and individuals.

=== Tarantism ===
In Italy, a similar phenomenon was tarantism, in which the victims were said to have been poisoned by a tarantula or scorpion. Its earliest-known outbreak was in the 13th century, and the only antidote known was to dance to particular music to separate the venom from the blood. It occurred only in the summer months. As with dancing mania, people would suddenly begin to dance, sometimes affected by a perceived bite or sting and were joined by others, who believed the venom from their own old bites was reactivated by the heat or the music. Dancers would perform a tarantella, accompanied by music which would eventually "cure" the victim, at least temporarily.

Some participated in further activities, such as tying themselves up with vines and whipping each other, pretending to sword fight, drinking large amounts of wine, and jumping into the sea. Sufferers typically had symptoms resembling those of dancing mania, such as headaches, trembling, twitching and visions.

As with dancing mania, participants apparently did not like the color black, and women were reported to be most affected. Unlike dancing mania, tarantism was confined to Italy and southern Europe. It was common until the 17th century, but ended suddenly, with only very small outbreaks in Italy until as late as 1959.

A study of the phenomenon in 1959 by religious history professor Ernesto de Martino revealed that most cases of tarantism were probably unrelated to spider bites. Many participants admitted that they had not been bitten, but believed they were infected by someone who had been, or that they had simply touched a spider. The result was mass panic, with a "cure" that allowed people to behave in ways that were, normally, prohibited at the time. Despite their differences, tarantism and dancing mania are often considered synonymous.

== Reactions ==
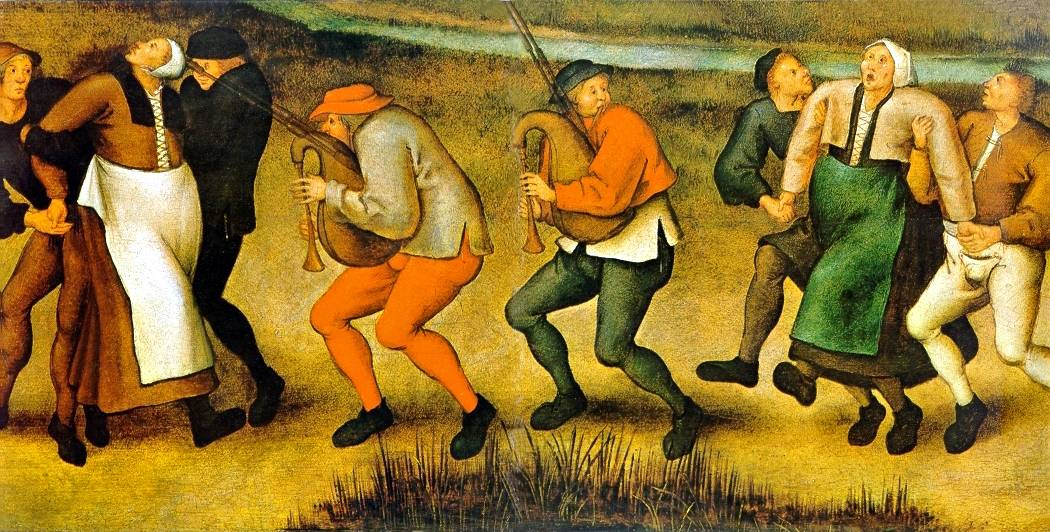
Music was typically played during outbreaks of dancing mania, as it was thought to remedy the problem. A painting by Pieter Brueghel the Younger, after drawings by his father

As the real cause of dancing mania was unknown, many of the treatments for it were simply hopeful guesses, although in some instances they were effective. The 1374 outbreak occurred only decades after the Black Death, and was treated in a similar fashion: dancers were isolated, and some were exorcised. People believed that the dancing was a curse brought about by St. Vitus; they responded by praying and making pilgrimages to places dedicated to St. Vitus.

Prayers were also made to St. John the Baptist, who some believed also caused the dancing. Others claimed to be possessed by demons, or Satan, therefore exorcisms were often performed on dancers. Bartholomew notes that music was often played while participants danced, as that was believed to be an effective remedy, and during some outbreaks musicians were even employed to play. Midelfort describes how the music encouraged others to join in, however, and thus effectively made things worse, as did the dancing places that were sometimes set up.

== Theories ==
Numerous hypotheses have been proposed for the causes of dancing mania, and it remains unclear whether it was a real illness or a social phenomenon. One of the most prominent theories is that victims suffered from ergot poisoning, which was known as St. Anthony's fire in the Middle Ages. During floods and damp periods, ergots were able to grow and affect rye and other crops. Some historians link ergot poisoning to phenomena like the dancing plagues during the late medieval and Renaissance periods, and even the Salem witch hysteria, as suggested by Oliver Sacks. Ergotism can cause hallucinations and convulsions, but cannot account for the other strange behaviour most commonly identified with dancing mania.

Other theories suggest that the symptoms were similar to encephalitis, epilepsy, and typhus, but as with ergotism, those conditions cannot account for all symptoms.

Numerous sources discuss how dancing mania, and tarantism, may have simply been the result of stress and tension caused by natural disasters around the time, such as plagues and floods. The recurring waves of the Black Death, other natural disasters, would have combined with the dawn of Reformation to make for a great deal of uncertainty and challenge for the people of Europe during this time period.

Hetherington and Munro describe dancing mania as a result of "shared stress"; people may have danced to relieve themselves of the stress and poverty of the day, and in so doing, attempted to become ecstatic and see visions.

According to Deborah Hyde, the spontaneous spread of this phenomenon through social networks played a significant role:

"It’s hard to deny that the dancing mania was marked by social contagion exacerbated by stress. Outbreaks occurred along trade routes or reoccurred in the same areas – where people had knowledge of the format, in other words. Beliefs and behaviour can travel just like pathogens."

Another popular theory is that the outbreaks were all staged, and the appearance of strange behaviour was due to its unfamiliarity. Religious cults may have been acting out well-organised dances, in accordance with ancient Greek and Roman rituals. Despite being banned at the time, these rituals could be performed under the guise of uncontrollable dancing mania. Justus Hecker, a 19th century medical writer, described it as a kind of festival, where a practice known as "the kindling of the Nodfyr" was carried out. This involved jumping through fire and smoke, in an attempt to ward off disease. Bartholomew notes how participants in this ritual would often continue to jump and leap long after the flames had gone.

It is certain that many participants of dancing mania were psychologically disturbed, but it is also likely that some took part out of fear, or simply wished to copy everyone else. Sources agree that dancing mania was one of the earliest-recorded forms of mass hysteria, and describe it as a "psychic epidemic", with numerous explanations that might account for the behaviour of the dancers. It has been suggested that the outbreaks may have been due to cultural contagion triggered, in times of particular hardship, by deeply rooted popular beliefs in the region regarding angry spirits capable of inflicting a "dancing curse" to punish their victims.

== See also ==
- Dancing plague of 1518
- Ee ja nai ka, a cultural practice in 19th century Japan with some similarities
- Maenads, a somewhat similar religious practice in ancient Greece
- Moribund the Burgermeister, a song about a medieval outbreak of dancing mania
- Social contagion
- Tanganyika laughter epidemic
- The Dancing Mania, an epidemic of the Middle Ages, an 1832 book
- Dance marathon
- Flash mobs, which sometimes involve dancing
