= August Hirsch =

German physician and medical historian

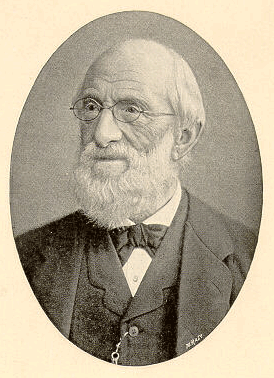
August Hirsch

August Hirsch (4 October 1817, Danzig – 28 January 1894, Berlin) was a German physician and medical historian.

== Biography ==
He practiced in Danzig after studying at Berlin and Leipzig. In recognition of his studies on malarial fever and his work, Handbuch der historisch-geographischen Pathologie, he was in 1863 made professor at Berlin. In 1873, he was a member of the German Cholera Commission, studied the conditions of Posen and West Prussia, and published a report (1874). He studied the plague in Astrakhan in 1879 and 1880, and in the latter year wrote a report to his Government.

== Literary works ==
- Die grossen Volkskrankheiten des Mittelalters, a revision of Hecker's collected writings, 1865
- Jahresbericht über die Fortschritte und Leistungen der Medizin, with Rudolf Virchow, 1866 et seq.
- Die Meningitis Cerebro-spinalis Epidemica, 1866
- Geschichte der Augenheilkunde, 1877
- Handbuch der historisch-geographischen Pathologie, 3 Vols., 1881-1886
  - Handbook of Geographical and Historical Pathology, 3 Vols., 1883–1886, trans. by Charles Creighton
- Biographisches Lexikon der hervorragenden Ärzte aller Zeit, editor, 6 Vols., 1884-1888
- Geschichte der medizinischen Wissenschaften in Deutschland, 1893
