= Timeline of influenza =

This is a timeline of influenza, briefly describing major events such as outbreaks, epidemics, pandemics, discoveries and developments of vaccines. In addition to specific year/period-related events, there is the seasonal flu that kills between 250,000 and 500,000 people every year and has claimed between 340 million and 1 billion human lives throughout history.

== Overview ==
| Year/period | Key developments |
|---|---|
| Before the 16th century | The outbreak of influenza reported in 1173 is not considered to be a pandemic, and other reports to 1500 generally lack reliability. |
| 16th century | The 1510 influenza pandemic spread from Asia to Africa, then engulfing Europe. It is the first documented case of intercontinental spread of an influenza virus, with less lethality than future pandemics. The 1557 influenza pandemic spread from Asia to the Ottoman Empire, then Europe, the Americas, and Africa. This flu pandemic is the first to be reliably recorded as spreading worldwide, is when flu received its first English names. It is also the first pandemic in which flu is linked to miscarriages. The pandemic lasted for at least two years. The 1580 pandemic is well-documented, with high mortality recorded as influenza spreads across Europe. |
| 18th century | Data from this century is more informative of pandemics than those of previous years. The first influenza pandemic of the 18th century begins in 1733. |
| 19th century | Two influenza pandemics are recorded in the century. Avian influenza is recorded for the first time. |
| 20th century | Influenza pandemics are recorded four times, starting with the deadly Spanish flu. This is also the period of virus isolation and development of vaccines. Prior to the 20th century, much information about influenza is generally not considered certain. Although the virus seems to have caused epidemics throughout human history, historical data on influenza are difficult to interpret, because the symptoms can be similar to those of other respiratory diseases. |
| 1945 – 21st century | International health organizations merge, and large scale vaccination campaigns begin. |
| 21st century | Worldwide accessible databases multiply in order to control outbreaks and prevent pandemics. New influenza strain outbreaks still occur. Efficacy of currently available vaccines is still insufficient to diminish the current annual health burden induced by the virus. One influenza pandemic has occurred thus far in the 21st century, in 2009. |

== Full timeline: Hippocrates – 2017 ==
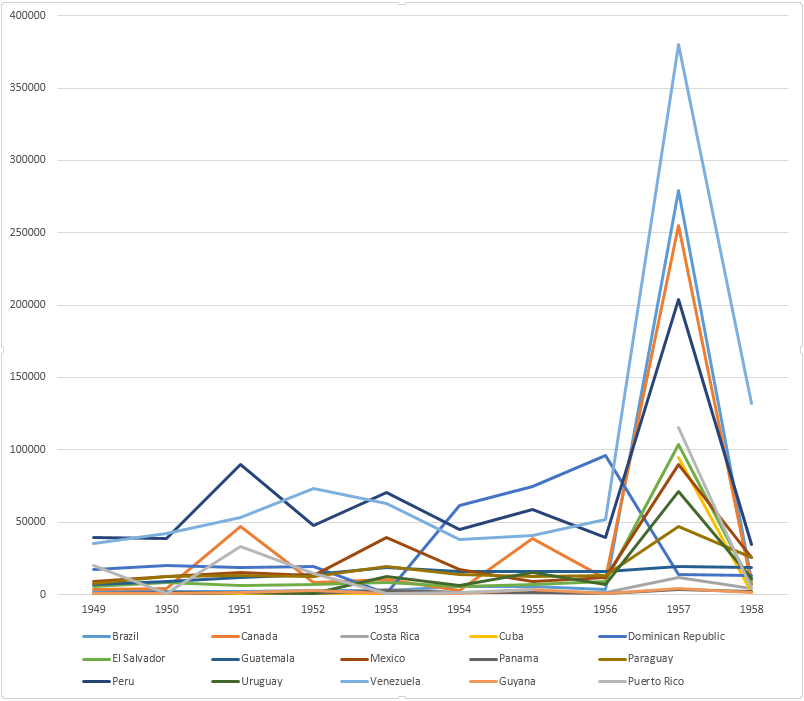
Reported cases of influenza in North American and South American countries for the period 1949–1958, illustrating the severity of influenza A virus subtype H2N2 pandemic in 1957. Chile (not shown in the graph) was severely hit and reported 1,408,430 cases in 1957.

Specific strains of influenza infection throughout the 20th century.

Influenza has been studied by countless physicians, epidemiologists, and medical historians. Chroniclers distinguished its outbreaks from other diseases by the rapid, indiscriminate way it struck down entire populations. Flu has been called various names including tac, coqueluche, the new disease, gruppie, grippe, castrone, influenza, and commonly just catarrh by many chroniclers and physicians throughout the ages.

| Year/period | Type of event | Event | Geographical location |
|---|---|---|---|
| 400 BCE | Medical development | The symptoms of human influenza were described by Hippocrates. | |
| 1173 | Epidemic | This is the first epidemic reported where the symptoms were probably influenza. | Europe |
| 1357 | | The term influenza was first used to describe a disease prevailing in 1357. It would be applied again to the epidemic in 1386−1387. | Italy |
| 1386–1387 | Epidemic | An epidemic of influenza-like illness developed in Europe, preferentially killing elderly and debilitating persons. This is probably the first documentation of a key epidemiological feature of both pandemic and seasonal influenza. | Europe |
| 1411 | Epidemic | An epidemic of coughing disease associated with spontaneous miscarriages was noted in Paris. The illness was referred to as le tac by some contemporaries. | France |
| 1414 | Epidemic | Another outbreak of flu was recorded in Paris; possibly the first time the disease was referred to as coqueluche. | |
| 1510 | Pandemic | An influenza pandemic developed in Asia and proceeded northward to involve North Africa, then all of Europe. Attack rates were extremely high, but fatality was low and said to be restricted to weaker individuals like children and those who were bled. | Africa, Eurasia |
| 1557–1558 | Pandemic | An influenza pandemic spread westward from Asia to Africa and Europe, then traveled aboard European ships across the Atlantic Ocean. Another wave in 1558-59 spread worldwide with devastating effects. | Eurasia |
| 1580 | Pandemic | | Eurasia, Africa |
| 1729–1730 | Epidemic | Influenza broke out suddenly in Moscow in April, 1729, apparently causing the imperial household to flee the city. The disease was not reported again, however, until the fall, in Sweden in September; it spread throughout Germany in October and November, England in October and December, and Switzerland in December and January the following year. Paris was hit that month, and Rome in February. The outbreak continued its spread in Germany in February, and in Italy in March, when it was also reported in Spain. This was the first "well-authenticated" outbreak of influenza to occur in Iceland, in March 1730. | Eurasia |
| 1732–1733 | Pandemic | This has generally been considered the first pandemic of influenza in the 18th century. However, it is not entirely clear whether this was a totally distinct outbreak from the first or rather a "long-delayed recurrence". Some authors have historically considered the two as related epidemics during a single period of influenza, while others have considered them separately, suggesting no connection between them beyond both being incidences of influenza. The disease seems to have been present in the northeast United States as early as October 1732, after which reports of it came out of Newfoundland, Barbados, Jamaica, Mexico, Peru, and Chile. The following month it appeared in Germany, reportedly coming from Russia through Poland. It spread throughout Germany in November and into December, when it caused outbreaks in Switzerland and Holland through the end of the year. Notably, it was reported on the Isle of Bourbon, off of Madagascar, in December as well. It prevailed in London and Paris in January 1733, as well as the Netherlands; that same month, it was reported in Italy, where it continued into March. Madrid was visited in February. | Americas, Eurasia |
| 1742–1743 | Epidemic | An outbreak of "catarrhal fever" prevailed in several countries in the winter of 1741–1742, in particular Germany, before the disease reappeared the following October of 1742 in Switzerland. From there it spread throughout much of Italy through February 1743, when it was first reported in Paris and other parts of France. The Netherlands and Belgium were affected in March, and England in April. Although not a pandemic, this outbreak was characterized by "enormous morbidity" and came amidst a period, from 1742 to 1744, "when European deaths associated with influenza-like illnesses reached extraordinary peaks." In January 1743 alone, over 8,000 in Rome and 5,000 in Mainz reported died from the disease. However, some of the mortality was also attributed at the time to the use of venesection as a treatment. Though the name had been used in English before, this was the first time "influenza" was broadly used to refer to the disease. While it prevailed extensively in Italy, the rumor of a "great epidemic" of "influenza" in that country spread faster than the disease itself, and the name came to be used in England, at least for the duration of the outbreak. Once it had passed, the name fell out of common use. | Europe |
| 1761–1762 | Pandemic | A "severe influenza" broke out in the northern United States in the winter and spring of 1761. It reportedly spread across the entire country as well as the West Indies. The disease did not appear in Europe, however, until the following February of 1762, when it caused outbreaks in Germany that lasted through April. In March, it was reported in Hungary and Denmark; in April, it was in England (London) and Scotland (Edinburgh), as well as Italy. In May, it appeared in Ireland, and between June and September it caused outbreaks in France, where it persisted in some parts into October. On the whole, the epidemic was notable for seeming to follow no clear path, "being reported now here, now there," and for missing certain locales altogether, such as Paris. Morbidity was "great" where the disease did strike. Mortality was relatively low, though it did vary, with some cities seeing more severe epidemics than others even within the same country. Spontaneous abortions and premature births were reported as new complications during this pandemic, which can be taken as a piece of supporting evidence that this was indeed a pandemic of influenza, in addition to its high attack rate and broad distribution across at least two continents. | Americas, Europe |
| 1781–1782 | Pandemic | Some accounts place the earliest outbreaks of this pandemic in the fall of 1780 in Southeast Asia, more specifically the coasts of modern-day Guangzhou and the Bengal and Coromandel regions. Influenza was later reported in St. Petersburg in December and in Vilnius in February 1781. It then prevailed in North America in the spring of that year. Other authors, however, consider only the 1781–1782 experience to be a true pandemic. If anything, the outbreaks in Russia and North America in 1780–1781 were possible "herald waves" of the later, greater epidemic. During this true pandemic period, influenza is said to have first broken out in China and British India in the fall of 1781. By the winter, it was sweeping through Siberia and Russia, visiting St. Petersburg again in January 1782. It moved through Germany between February and June. It struck Finland in February and Denmark, Sweden, and Hungary in April. After reaching England as early as April, influenza broke out in London and other parts in May and was general in England and Scotland in June. After hitting the Netherlands in May, it spread to France and then to Italy, where it broke out in June. Finally, it reached Spain by August, prevailing in Madrid and other parts. This epidemic solidified "influenza" as the name of the disease in English. Although first used generally in 1743 to refer to the affliction epidemic in Italy at the time, it was not until an epidemic in 1775 that the term began to be used again more generally, and by 1782, it was the typical name applied. In the summer of that year, when the disease hit England, the Royal College of Physicians formally adopted the Italian word as the official name. | Eurasia |
| 1788–1790 | Epidemic | Another epidemic, or series of epidemics, of influenza occurred at the end of this decade. This period has more recently been described as a pandemic, though historically it has not been considered as such; at most, it may "possibly" have been a pandemic. This lack of definition is reflected in how the epidemics are divided and described. In general, the initial period spanned from spring to fall 1788, when it spread across Europe; after a year-long absence, influenza reappeared in North America in the fall of 1789, initiating a second period that spanned at least into the spring of 1790. While these have often been treated separately, connecting them as part of a single period that lasted from 1788 to 1790 (perhaps even into 1791, at least in the United States) is by no means a novel interpretation of the data. The influenza was first reported in Russia in March 1788, in St. Petersburg and Kherson and in Poland. It then spread westward, invading Germany, Hungary, Denmark, England, Scotland, France, and Italy successively throughout the year and being reported finally in Switzerland in October. Observed influenza activity then remained low for nearly a year before the disease appeared in the Western Hemisphere, breaking out in the US states of Georgia and New York in September 1789. The epidemic crossed the entire United States in six to eight weeks. It was reported in Jamaica in October and Grenada in November, and by the end of the year it was prevalent in Nova Scotia and South America. After a short reprieve, the influenza resumed epidemic proportions in the spring of 1790 in the northeast United States and perhaps some other parts, declining about the first week of June. There is some evidence of increased severity during the spring wave as compared to the fall one. The disease was prevalent again in Philadelphia and neighboring counties in Pennsylvania, and was observed as well in Virginia and Rhode Island, in the winter of 1790–1791, but it was not nearly as widespread as its first two appearances. | Americas, Eurasia |
| 1830–1833 | Pandemic | | Eurasia, Americas |
| 1878 | Scientific development | First descriptions of avian influenza, termed "fowl plague," was recorded by Perroncito in Italy. | Italy |
| 1889–1892 | Pandemic | | Worldwide |
| 1901 | Scientific development | | |
| 1918–1920 | Pandemic | In March 1918, 48 soldiers died of "pneumonia" during an outbreak at Fort Riley, Kansas. The flu traveled unchecked eastward to New England military bases before traveling across the Atlantic Ocean on crowded military ships to Europe amid World War I. It spread rapidly through European cities and was nicknamed "Spanish flu" for the uncensored reporting in Spain, as moving armies spread flu around the world. The flu returned in waves for the next 2 years. | Worldwide; originated in the US, some theories suggest France or other countries |
| 1931 | Scientific development | Richard Shope isolates the Influenza A virus from pigs. | |
| 1933 | Scientific development | Shope and his team discover the Influenza A virus. | United Kingdom |
| 1936 | Medical development | | Russia |
| 1942 | Medical development | | |
| 1945 | Medical development | | United States |
| 1946 | Organization | | United States (Atlanta) |
| 1947 | Organization | | France (serves worldwide) |
| 1948 | Organization | | |
| 1952 | Organization (Research institute) | | |
| 1957 | Pandemic | | Worldwide |
| 1959 | Non–human infection | | United Kingdom |
| 1961 | Non–human infection | | South Africa |
| 1963 | Non–human infection | | United Kingdom |
| 1966 | Non–human infection | | Canada |
| 1968–1970 | Pandemic | | Worldwide |
| 1973 | Program launch | | |
| 1976 | Epidemic | | United States (New Jersey) |
| 1976 | Non–human infection | | Australia |
| 1977 | Epidemic | | Russia, China, worldwide |
| 1978 | Medical development | | |
| 1980 | Medical development | | United States |
| 1983 | Non–human infection | | Ireland |
| 1988 | Infection | | China |
| 1990–1996 | Medical development | | United States |
| 1997 | Infection | | China (Hong Kong) |
| 1997 | Infection | | Australia |
| 1999 | Infection | | China (Hong Kong) |
| 2002 | Infection | | United States |
| 2003–2007 | Infection | See also: Global spread of H5N1 | East Asia, Southeast Asia |
| 2003 | Infection | | Netherlands |
| 2004 | Organization | | |
| 2004 | Infection | | Canada |
| 2004 | Infection | | Egypt |
| 2004 | Non–human infection | | United States |
| 2005 | Organization | | United States |
| 2005 | Organization | | United States (New York City) |
| 2005 | Infection | | Cambodia, Romania |
| 2006 | Organization | | China (Beijing) |
| 2007 | Non-human infection | | Australia |
| 2008 | Scientific development | | Worldwide |
| 2008 | Service launch | | United States |
| 2009–10 | Pandemic | | Worldwide |
| 2011 | Non–human infection | | United States |
| 2012 | Scientific development | | |
| 2012 | Scientific project/controversy | | Netherlands (Erasmus Medical Center), United States (University of Wisconsin–Madison) |
| 2012 | Medical development | | United States |
| 2013 | Epidemic | | China, Vietnam |
| 2013 | Medical development | | United States |
| 2013 | Infection | | China |
| 2015 | Program | | United States |
| 2017 | Medical development | | United States |
| 2017 | Scientific development | | Finland |

== See also ==
- Influenza
- Bibliography of the history of the 1918 influenza pandemic
- Timeline of global health
