= René Panthier =

French doctor and resistance member

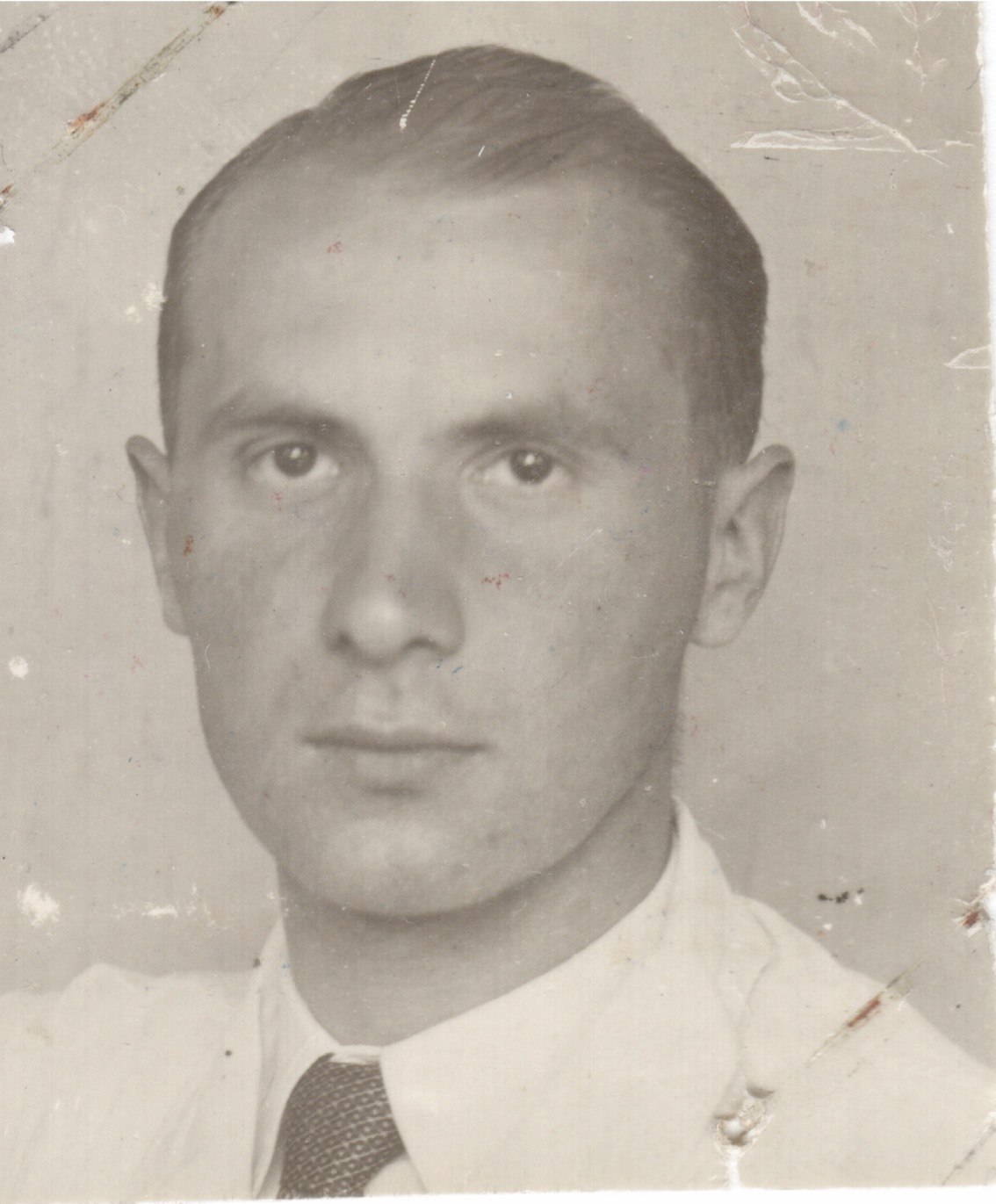
- Born: 18 January 1915; Montloué, France
- Died: 10 July 1970 (aged 55); Paris, France
- Citizenship: French
- Known for: Research in microbiology, fight against the Nazi occupation in France
- Spouse: Paule Descola
- Children: 4

René Panthier (18 January 1915 – 10 July 1970) was a French physician and microbiologist who served as a scientist for the Pasteur Institute for thirty two years where was a research assistant (1941), head of laboratory (1944), and head of service (1957). In 1966 he was appointed deputy director, and in 1967 director of the Application Center of the institute. In the years 1938-1944, with Paul Giroud he studied the adaptation of Rickettsia prowazekii, the agent responsible for typhus, by the inoculation of a rabbit by the respiratory route. This research provided the basis for the Durand-Giroud vaccine.

During the 1948-1949 influenza epidemic, together with Geneviève Cateigne and Claude Hannoun he isolated the first strains of the influenza virus in France. In 1964, he isolated with Claude Hannoun, Jean Mouchet and Jean-Pierre Eouzan the first strains of the West Nile virus in the Rhône delta of the Camargue in the south of France. He also developed a method for titrating antiviral antibodies using a seroprotection test.

== Biography ==
René Panthier was born in the north-eastern French province of Lorraine. He was four years old when his father, Irénée Raoul Panthier, died following gas poisoning during World War I. As ward of the state, René Panthier studied medicine at the Faculty of Medicine in Paris. He became Paris Hospital intern in 1934 and trained at the Pasteur Hospital under the supervision of a renowned infectious clinician, René Martin. He completed a thesis on hemorrhagic fevers under the supervision of Paul Giroud. He defended his Medical Degree in September 1939, a few days after Britain and France declared war on Germany following Poland invasion.

== World War II ==
In September 1939, Panthier was called and assigned to a military field hospital. He was released from service in August 1940 in Castres after the Germans invaded France. He resumed his research on typhus under the direction of Paul Giroud in the vaccine department of the Pasteur Institute in Paris. He participated in one of the first French movement of resistance fighters, the Armée des Volontaires (A.V.). Following the arrest, on 11 February 1942, of Marie-Auguste Chabaud, research assistant in the leprosy laboratory of the Pasteur Institute and head of the AV group in the 15th district of Paris, he was sent quickly on a mission by Jacques Trefouël, director of the Pasteur Institute, first at the Pasteur Institute in Algiers (Algeria) and then at La Roche Beaulieu in the remaining free part of France (Zone libre), to create production centers for typhus vaccine. At that time, the Pasteur Institute faced a sensitive issue : the German authorities requisitioned serums and vaccines while typhus raged in French prison camps in Germany. Decision was made to produce typhus vaccine on a large scale using the Durand - Giroud process. The vaccine produced in the unoccupied territories was sent to the prison camps. Upon his return to occupied Paris in May 1943, he participated in the subversive activities of the Wizard (Jean Millet/William Savy) network of the Special Operation Executive, and became an underground agent (P2) from March to September 1944. Wizard network tasks led to the identification of a secret ammunition dump containing 2,000 V1 rockets ready to fire in the stone quarries at St-Leu-d'Esserent, near Paris. Bomber command stove it between 27 June and 5 August 1944. He was entrusted in November 1944 the establishment of a medical service responsible for the reception of prisoners, deportees and refugees in Lille at the northern tip of France. Recalled at his request in the Far East Expeditionary Force, he volunteered to participate in the reduction of one of the last pockets of Third Reich resistance along the Atlantic coast of France, in Royan. He was injured on 15 April 1945 by a mortar shrapnel during military operation. He embarked as a lieutenant doctor on 5 November 1945 aboard the victory ship Kings Point Victory for Indochina where he was appointed chief medical officer of the Indochina-South military laboratory and head of the bacteriology laboratory of the Pasteur Institute in Saigon (currently Ho Chi Minh City). He was demobilized in Marseille on 28 February 1947 and returned to the Pasteur Institute in Paris.

== Post-war scientific activities and leadership functions ==
He then entered the influenza laboratory directed by René Dujarric de la Rivière. At the latter's request, he tried to apply the method used by Paul Giroud and Paul Durand to the typhus bacteria for the influenza virus. This strategy revealed unsuccessful; it did not replace the preparation of the influenza vaccine on eggs. He met Paule Descola who was preparing her M.D. thesis on polioviruses], in Jean Vieuchange's laboratory at the Pasteur Institute. He married her in March 1948. Four children were born from this union: Marie-Lise, Gilles, Jean-Jacques and Jean-Noël. During the winter of 1948, he and his collaborators isolated the first strains of influenza virus in France.

He was appointed in July 1949 director of the Hellenic Pasteur Institute. The Second World War and the ensuing Greek Civil War left the Pasteur Institute in Athens in a sorry state. A the end of this mission he was appointed honorary director of the Hellenic Pasteur Institute. He returned to the Pasteur Institute in Paris in 1952 to work on the yellow fever virus. He set up research laboratories and the production of yellow fever vaccine according to the method of Max Theiler, Nobel Prize in medicine in 1951. He developed in particular a method of titration of yellow fever antibodies by a neutralization test. He also ensured an increasing production of the influenza vaccine.

In 1962 he joined the Pasteur Institute in Guinea as director. The situation of this Pasteur Institute in Kindia was therefore difficult because of the political tensions between France and Guinea, which had just gained independence. Upon his return to the Pasteur Institute in Paris, he extended his activity to other viruses transmitted by insects (arboviruses). He contributed several epidemiological and virological studies on viral infections in France and in Africa. With his collaborators, he isolated in France strains of arboviruses pathogenic for humans, including West Nile virus (1964).

In March 1964, the situation at the Pasteur Institute was worrying. A study commission for the reform of the Pasteur Institute, made of Elie Wollman, René Panthier and Bernard Virat was established. The study commission drafted a reorganization project which was implemented with the arrival of director Pierre Mercier. Panthier was appointed in 1966 as deputy director of the Pasteur Institute by director Pierre Mercier. He died on 10 July 1970 at the Pasteur Hospital in Paris at 55 from cancer. His widow died in 2003 at 84.

== Awards and recognition ==
Officer of the Légion d'Honneur, Croix de Guerre 1939-1945, King's Commendation for Brave Conduct, Medal of honor for Epidemics, Knight of Public Health, and Vermeil Medal by the Académie Nationale de Médecine
