= Paul Giroud =

French physician and biologist

Dr Paul Giroud
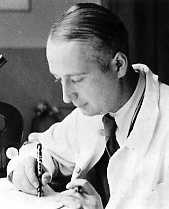
- Born: 6 June 1898; Moulins, France
- Died: 21 January 1989 (aged 90); Paris, France
- Citizenship: French
- Education: Institut Pasteur; Collège de France; Institut Pasteur de Tunis
- Known for: Discovery of vaccine against typhus and rickettsioses
- Awards: Montyon Prize of the Academy of Sciences (1942)
- Scientific career
- Fields: Bacteriology, immunology
- Doctoral advisor: Auguste Pettit, Charles Nicolle

Paul Giroud (6 June 1898 – 21 January 1989) was a French physician and biologist.

== Biography ==
Born in Munet (Moulins), Allier, France he studied and worked at the Institut Pasteur in Paris.

Giroud was Head of Laboratory at the Institut Pasteur in Paris from 1930 to 1938. During these years he carried out several missions in Tunisia to research the source of typhus. Meanwhile, he also travelled to the USSR, where he met Vladimir Barykin, who had developed a method of cultivating the agent of typhus for the preparation of a vaccine. In 1940 Giroud together with René Panthier developed a vaccine against typhus. After this discovery Giroud studied the rickettsioses in Congo, Rwanda, Kenya and Ethiopia. He also worked on a vaccine against Rocky Mountain spotted fever.

In 1956 he was elected member of the Académie de Médecine and in 1971 promoted to Commander of the Legion of Honour in the biological science section.
