= Barykin =

Barykin, feminine: Barykina (Russian: Барыкин, Барыкина) is a Russian-language surname. Notable people with the surname include:

- Alexander Barykin (1952–2011), Soviet and Russian singer and songwriter
- Mariya Barykina (born 1973), Russian ice hockey player
- Vladimir Barykin (1879–1939), Russian microbiologist and epidemiologist
