= Guillaume de Baillou =

French physician and founder of modern epidemiology

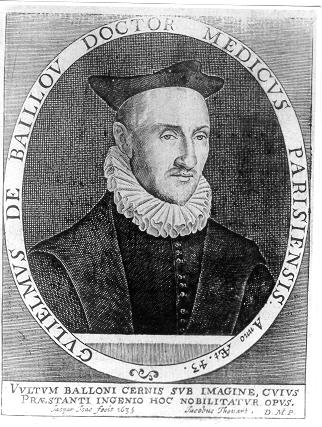
Guillaume de Baillou

Guillaume de Baillou (Latin: Ballonius) (1538–1616) was a French physician born in Paris. He was a member of the Baillou family, one of the oldest aristocratic families in Europe.

== Life ==
He studied at the University of Paris, where he was a pupil of Jean Fernel (1497–1558). He attained his Bachelor of Arts degree in 1568, and his medical doctorate in 1570. He was an instructor in Paris for 46 years, and eventually became dean of the Faculty of Medicine. For a period of time he was personal physician to Henry IV (1553–1610).

Guillaume de Baillou is considered to be the first epidemiologist since Hippocrates, and is credited as the founder of modern epidemiology. He did extensive studies of epidemics that plagued Paris, and is additionally credited with providing the first clinical description of pertussis (whooping cough) in 1578. He also provided the first modern descriptions of rheumatism and arthritis of which he defined in the treatise Liber de Rheumatismo et Pleuritide dorsali.

Guillaume de Baillou is an ancestor of Jean Chevallier de Baillou (1684–1758) whose famous geology collection provided the basis for today's Natural History Museum of Vienna, Austria.

== Works ==
- Guillaume de Baillou (1734). Gulielmi Ballonii Opera medica omnia (in Latin). Vol. 1. A. Jeremias.

== Bibliography ==
- Guillaume de Baillou Biography (1538–1616).
- Schumann Antiquariat, Zurich
