= Petrus Forestus =

Dutch physician

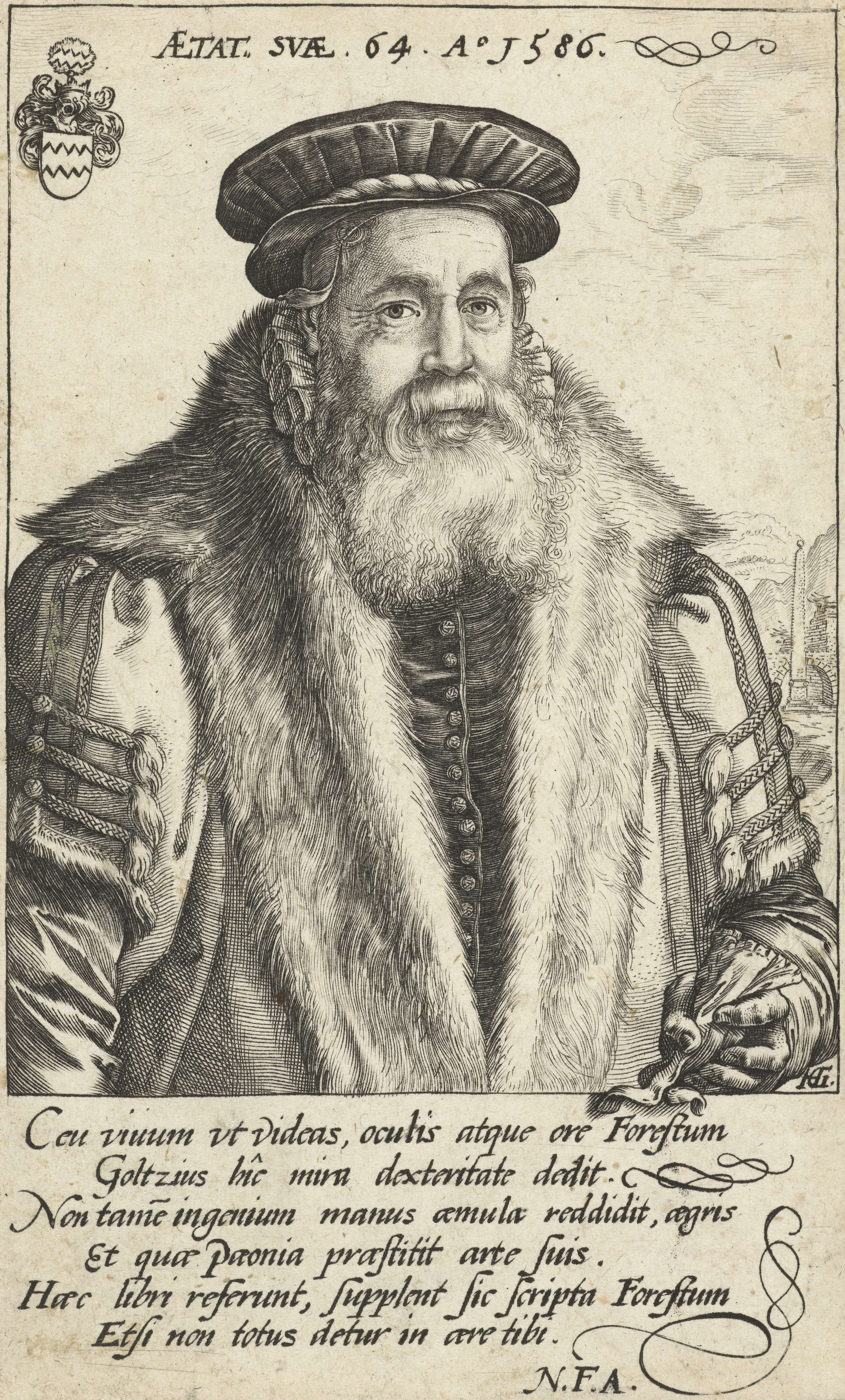
Petrus Forestus at the age of 64 (1586).

Pieter van Foreest, also called Petrus Forestus (Alkmaar, 1521 – Alkmaar, 1597), was one of the most prominent physicians of the Dutch Republic. He was known as the "Dutch Hippocrates".

== Life ==
Petrus Forestus was the son of Jorden van Foreest and Margriet, daughter of Nanning Beyers. He received his early schooling at the Alkmaar Latin school. Around 1536 he started studying at the University of Leuven. In 1540 he began a so-called peregrinatio Academica, an educational journey in which he visited several European universities in order to acquire detailed knowledge of medicine. He stayed three years in Bologna, and also studied in Padua, Venice, and Ferrara. On 29 November 1543 he graduated at the University of Bologna. Then he worked for some time in Rome and Paris. In 1546 he returned to Alkmaar, where he opened a medical practice. He married in 1546 Eva van Teijlingen (1525 – 1595).

In 1558 Forestus was appointed to the post of city physician of Delft, a function he performed for over 37 years. In August 1574, during the siege of Leiden, he was consulted by prince William of Orange, who lay ill at Delfshaven. After that Forestus was repeatedly consulted by members of the princely family.

Forestus was invited by the Curators of the newly founded Leiden University to attend the opening ceremony on 8 February 1575. He participated in the festive procession as "doctor and professor of medicine" and stayed in Leiden until 12 February in order to sign the Statutes of the new university. After that he returned to Delft. He preferred his medical practice, and decided not to take up an academic position.

After the assassination of Prince William of Orange on 10 July 1584, Forestus conducted the autopsy and embalming together with his colleague from Delft, Cornelius Busennius. They made an extensive report of the autopsy to the States of Holland.

Petrus Forestus died on 10 March 1597. He was over 75 years old. His remains were buried in the Great or St. Lawrence Church in Alkmaar on 13 March 1597. The last line on his tombstone reads: Hippocrates batavus si fuit ille fuit (If ever there was a Dutch Hippocrates, it was this man).

== Works ==
Forestus had an aversion to quacks, charlatans, and the unauthorized practice of medicine. Part of an unpublished manuscript was titled: Vander Empiriken, Landloeperen ende Valscher Medicynsbedroch (On charlatans, frauds, and the trickery and deceit with false medicine). In 1584 he managed to convince the Delft magistrates to place rules and restrictions on the practice of medicine.

During his practice years in Alkmaar, Forestus began to take notes on the maladies of his patients, and how he treated them. Later he arranged the data and eventually collected over 1350 Observationes with appropriate Scholia. The Observationes were personal perceptions of patients and diseases, and formed the basis for the subsequent Scholia, initially dedicated as a separate monograph to personal acquaintances such as Prince Maurice of Orange, and city governments, like those of Alkmaar, Delft, Leiden, Amsterdam and Enkhuizen. In 1609 all his monographs and the treatise on uroscopy were bundled and published in Frankfurt as the Opera Omnia. Numerous reprints followed.

== Sources ==
- Bruinvis, C.W. (1852): Petrus Forestus in De Navorscher, second edition, Frederik Muller, Amsterdam
- Foreest, H.A. van (1950): Het oude geslacht Van Foreest, Van Gorcum & Comp. N.V., Assen
- Houtzager (red.), H.L. (1989): Pieter van Foreest; Een Hollands medicus in de zestiende eeuw, Rodopi, Amsterdam ISBN 90-5183-156-0
- Houtzager (red.), H.L. (1997) "Pieter Van Foreest, The Dutch Hippocrates ," Vesalius 3 (1), pp. 3–12.
- bosman-Jelgersma (red.), H.A. van (1996): Pieter van Foreest; De Hollandse Hypocrates, Print Knijnenberg, Krommenie ISBN 90-70353-06-7
- Cox, J.C.M. (2005): De Heeren van Alkmaer; Regeerders en regenten, vroedschap en raad 1264-2005, Municipality Alkmaar, Alkmaar ISBN 90-73131-06-5
