= Thomas Short (physician, died 1772) =

English doctor and author (1690–1772)

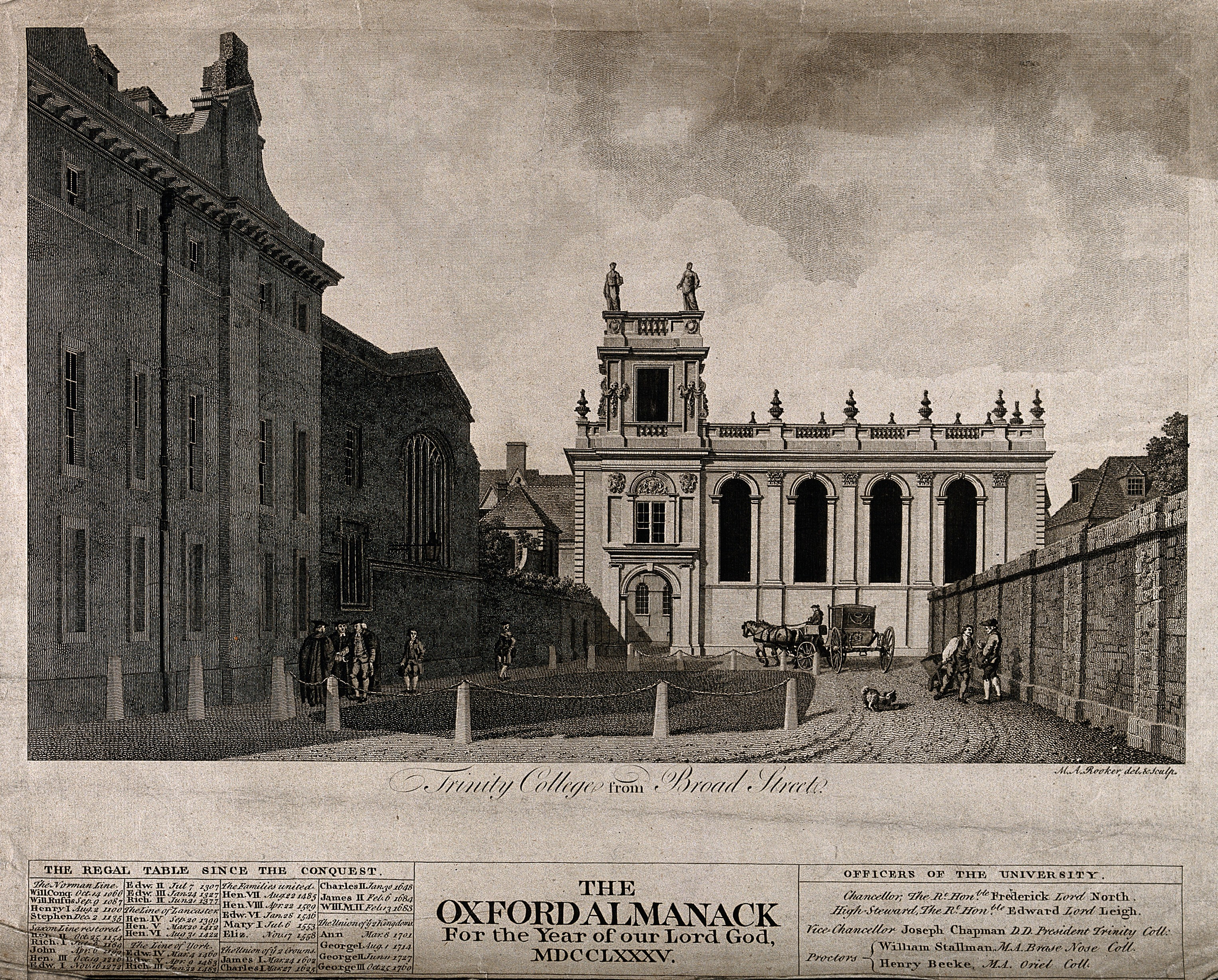
Trinity College in Oxford, where Thomas Short was educated, in 1782.

Thomas Short (1690–1772) was an English physician, epidemiologist, and medical historian. He is known for writing extensively on population theory and the history of disease outbreaks affecting England.

== Life and career ==
A draft deed indicates Thomas Short was the son of a merchant named James Short. From an early point in Thomas's life he was interested in chemistry and mineral water, and as a young man was educated in medicine at Trinity College in Oxford. After his studies he either practiced medicine or was counseled in Coventry from 1723 to 1728, and Short began officially working as a physician in Sheffield around 1725 or 1728. He published books about what he learned as a doctor treating patients. One of Short's earliest publications, in 1728, was medical literature on the negative health effects of obesity: In A Discourse concerning the causes and effects of Corpulency, etc he writes about how fat separates from the blood and why some individuals are more vulnerable to health problems than others.

Short was at a prolific stage of writing medical literature by the 1740s. Retaining his interest in mineral waters from early in his life, he began the decade by publishing An Essay Towards a Natural, Experimental, and Medicinal History of the Principle Mineral Waters. In 1746, he published Medicine Britannica: Or, a Treatise on such Physical Plants as are Generally to be Found in the Fields or Gardens in Great Britain. One of his more famous works was published at the end of the decade in 1749, A General Chronological History of the Air, Weather, Seasons, Meteors, &c., in Sundry Places and Different Times: More Particularly for the Space of 250 Years: Together with Some of Their Most Remarkable Effects on Animal (especially Human) Bodies and Vegetables. His descriptions of sixteenth century influenza pandemics in Europe, their pathologies, and recorded treatments have been cited by medical historians. Short's works were also read by contemporaries such as Benjamin Franklin.

In 1750, at age 60, Short had his Discourses on Tea, Sugar, Milk, Made-Wines, Spirits, Punch, Tobacco with Plain and Useful Rules for Gouty People published. The same year he also published New Observations, Natural, Moral, Civil, Political, and Medical, on City, Town, and Country Bills of Mortality, his first publication where Short focused his demographic interests discussing how diseases affected and altered populations. This was the checkpoint in his literary career where he became known for his writings on population theory.

In 1762, Short moved to Rotherham, where he lived for 10 years before dying in 1772.
