= Charles Creighton (physician) =

British physician and medical author

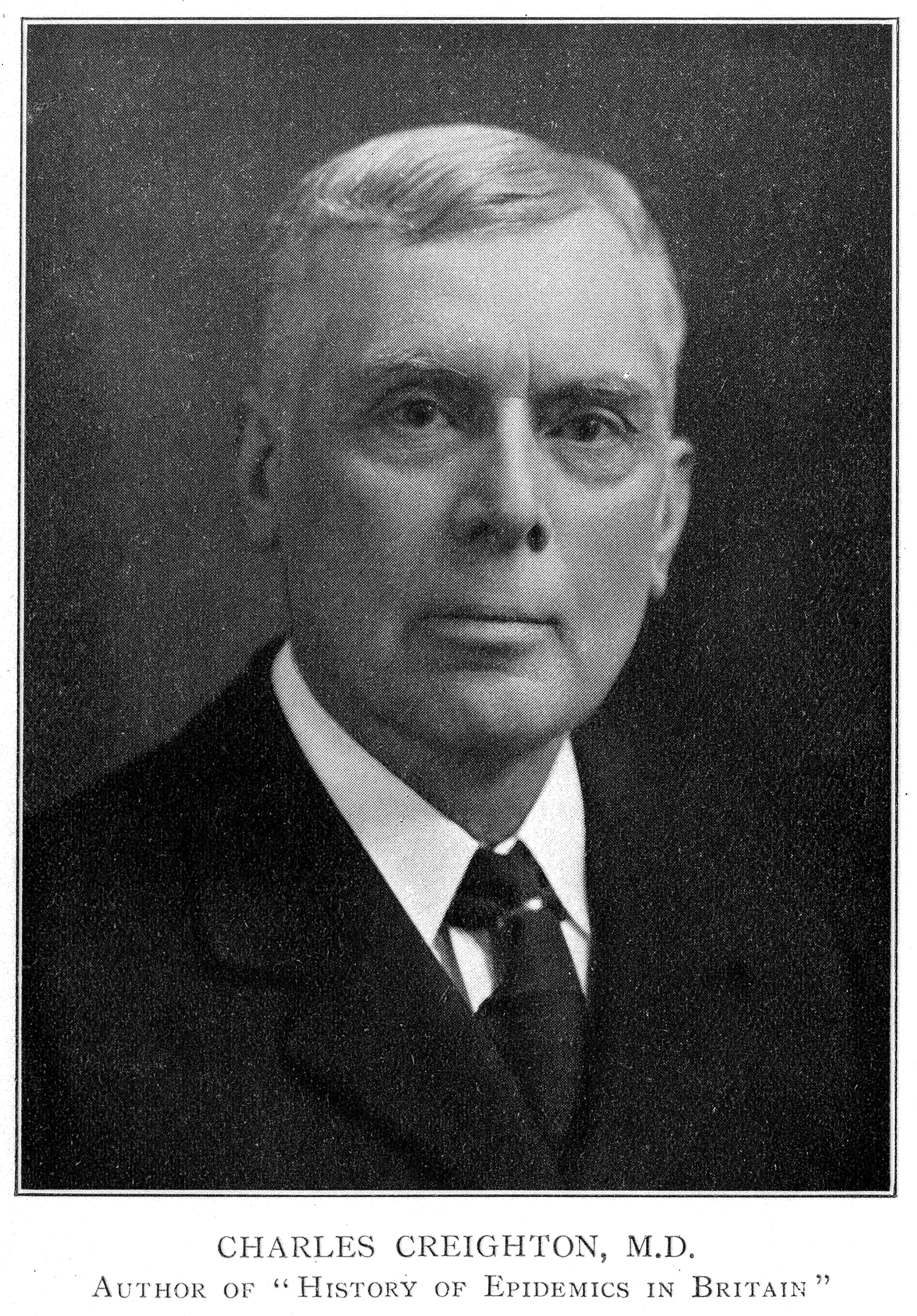
- Born: 22 November 1847; Peterhead, Scotland
- Died: 18 July 1927 (aged 79)
- Occupation(s): Physician, professor
- Known for: Disputing germ theory
- Medical career
- Institutions: University of Aberdeen
- Sub-specialties: Anatomy, medical historian
- Notable works: A History of Epidemics in Britain

Charles Creighton (22 November 1847 – 18 July 1927) was a British physician and medical author. He was highly regarded for his scholarly writings on medical history but was widely denounced for disputing the germ theory of infectious diseases.

== Biography ==
Creighton was born in Peterhead, Aberdeenshire, Scotland, the oldest son of Alexander Creighton and Agnes Brand Creighton. He received a scholarship to attend the University of Aberdeen and received his M.A. in 1867. He then enrolled as a medical student and passed his M.B. and M.S. exams in 1871. After graduation, he studied for a brief time with Karl von Rokitansky in Vienna and Rudolf Virchow in Berlin. He was awarded his M.D. in 1878.

After returning from Berlin in 1872, Creighton worked in London as a hospital registrar until his appointment in 1876 as demonstrator of anatomy at University of Cambridge. Over the next five years he wrote his first book, Bovine Tuberculosis in Man (1881), and published several articles on anatomy in the Journal of Anatomy and Physiology. He became co-editor of the journal in 1879.

Then, for unknown reasons, Creighton quit a promising career at Cambridge and returned to London in 1881. For the remainder of his life he worked independently on his studies and lived alone. Between 1881 and 1883 he published a three-volume translation from German of August Hirsch's Handbook of Geographical and Historical Pathology. His most significant work, A History of Epidemics in Britain, took several years to complete and the two volumes were published in 1891 and 1894.

In 1918 Creighton moved to Northamptonshire, England where he lived until his death in 1927.

== Anti-vaccination ==
Creighton was an anti-vaccinationist. He has been described by historian Roy Porter as the anti-vaccination movement's "most ardent and distinguished spokesmen." Creighton argued that vaccination was poisoning of the blood with contaminated material, which could provide no protection from disease.

Two articles he wrote for the Encyclopædia Britannica on pathology (1885) and vaccinations (1888) cast doubt on the existence of germs and the efficacy of vaccines. He was widely condemned for these views by leading medical journals. He continued to express his unorthodox and unpopular anti-vaccination views in The Natural History of Cowpox and Vaccinal Syphilis (1887) and Jenner and Vaccination (1889).

Creighton was an active member of the London Society for the Abolition of Compulsory Vaccination.

== Publications ==
- Type of Giant Cells of Tubercle, Journ. Anat. And Physiol
- Illustrations of the Pathology of Sarcoma Journ. Anat. And Physiol
- Function of the Periosteum, Journ. Anat. And Physiol
- Homology of the Suprarenals Journ. Anat. And Physiol
- Formation of Placenta in Guinea Pig Journ. Anat. And Physiol
- Illustrations of Unconscious Memory in Disease, including a Theory of Alteratives
- 1878 Contributions to the Physiology and Pathology of the Breast and its Lymphatic Glands
- 1881 Bovine Tuberculosis in Man
- 1883 On the Autonomous Life of the Specific Infections (address in Path. Brit. Med. Assoc., 1883)
- 1883-6 Handbook of Geographical and Historical Pathology (translated from the German of A. Hirsch), 3 vols.
- 1885 "Pathology", Encyclopædia Britannica, 9th edition
- Contrib. On Infection of Connective Tissue in Scirrhus Cancers of Breast Journ. Anat. And Physiol.
- 1887 The Natural History of Cow-pox and Vaccinal Syphilis Cassell & Co
- 1888 "Vaccination", Encyclopædia Britannica, 9th edition
- 1889 Jenner and Vaccination: A Strange Chapter of Medical History Swan Sonnenschein & Co.
- 1890 Vaccination: a Scientific Enquiry, Arena, Sept. 1890
- 1891, History of Epidemics in Britain, Volume I
- 1894, History of Epidemics in Britain, Volume II
- 1896 Microscopic Researches on the Formative Property of Glycogen
- 1905 Plague in India. A paper read on 18 May 1905, before the Indian Section of the Society of Arts. George Bell & Sons: London.
- 1902 Cancers and other Tumours of the Breast: researches showing their true seat and cause. Williams & Norgate: London & Oxford
- 1908 Contributions to the Physiological Theory of Tuberculosis. Williams & Norgate: London.
