= Vladimir Barykin =

Vladimir Aleksandrovich Barykin
- Born: Vladimir Aleksandrovich Barykin; Владимир Александрович Барыкин; 22 November 1879; Oryol Governorate
- Died: 15 April 1939 (aged 59)
- Occupations: microbiologist and epidemiologist

Vladimir Aleksandrovich Barykin (Russian: Владимир Александрович Барыкин; 22 November 1879 — 15 April 1939) was a Russian microbiologist and epidemiologist.

== Biography ==
Vladimir Aleksandrovich Barykin was born on 22 November 1879 in Oryol Governorate. He graduated from the Kazan Imperial University in 1900.

During the years 1901 to 1904, he worked as a doctor in the Kazan Governorate. From 1904 to 1905, during the Russo-Japanese War, he served in Manchuria as a physician-therapist in the Siberian military-sanitary train of Princess Zinaida Yusupova. From 1905 to 1908, Barykin was the head of the Staro-Harbinskaya bacteriological laboratory at the Chinese Eastern Railway and fought outbreaks of plague.

From 1908 to 1915, he worked at Kazan University. In 1912, he trained at the Nesterov Institute under the guidance of Ilya Mechnikov and Jules Bordet. From 1915 to 1922, he was a professor of microbiology at Rostov University. In 1921, he founded the Institute of Microbiology in Moscow and became its head. At the same time, he was the head of the Department of Microbiology of the First Moscow Medical University. He held these positions until 1931.

From 1932 to 1933, he was the scientific guide of the Kiev Bacteriological Institute and the head of the Department of microbiology of the Kiev Medical Institute. From 1933 to 1938, he held the post of scientific guide of the Central Institute of Epidemiology and was the head of the Department of Epidemiology of the Central Institute for Advanced Training of Physicians.

He was arrested in 1938 on charges of espionage. On 14 April 1939, he was sentenced to capital punishment and was executed the next day (according to other information, he died in a labour camp in 1942).

== Family ==
As of 1917, Barykin was married and had a son born in 1902.

He was later married to Z. M. Shakhmalieva-Barykina, a research fellow at the Central Institute of Epidemiology and Microbiology.

== Awards ==
- Order of Saint Stanislaus, 3rd class (18 June [1 July] 1916), for his leadership of the bacteriological detachment.
- Honored Scientist of the RSFSR (1937).
