= String sonata =

String sonata or Sonata for strings may refer to:

- Six string sonatas (Rossini)
- Sonata per archi (Henze)
- Sonata for String Orchestra (Walton)
