= Péchés de vieillesse =

Collection of compositions by G. Rossini

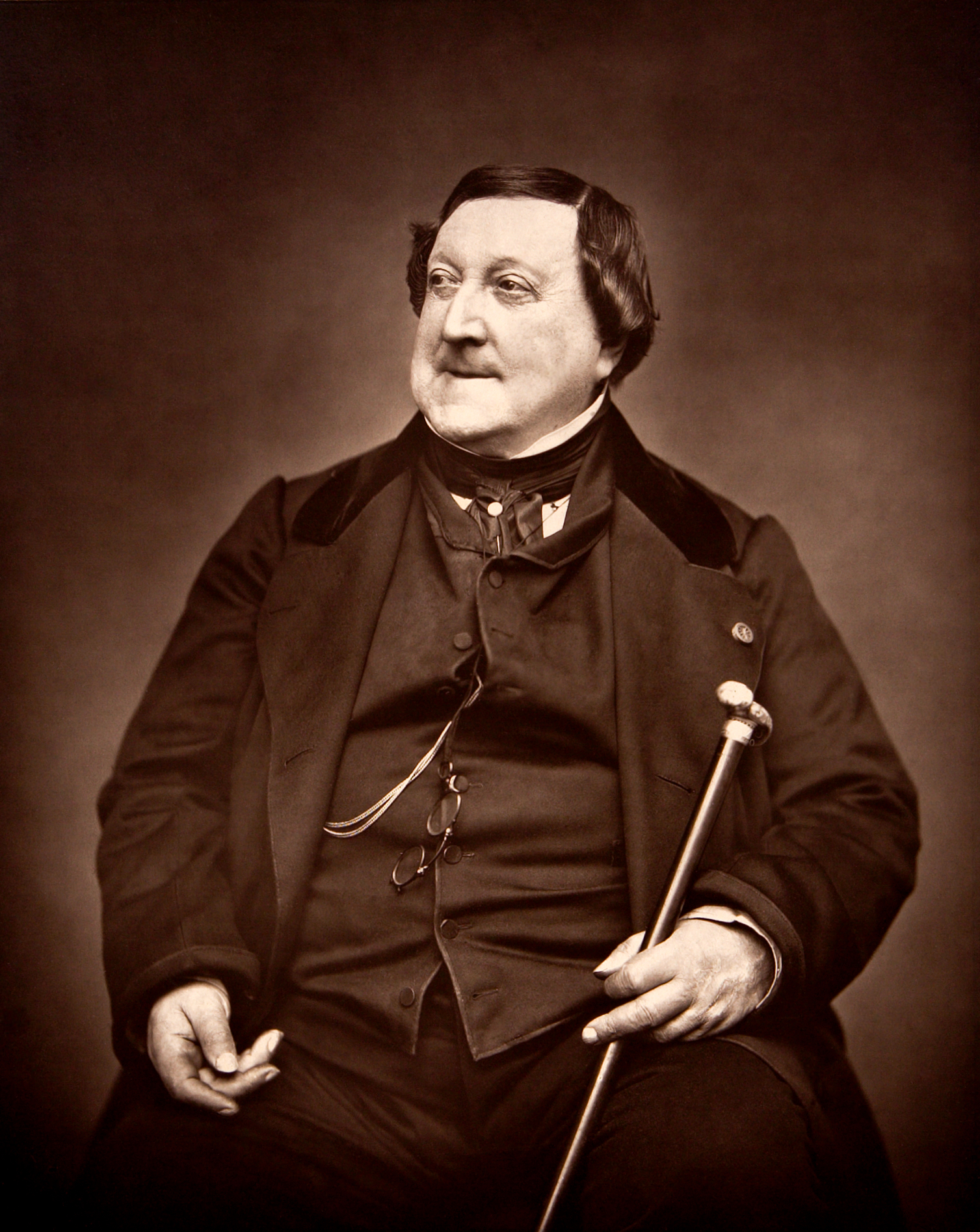
Gioachino Rossini in 1865, by Étienne Carjat

Péchés de vieillesse ("Sins of Old Age") is a collection of 150 vocal, chamber and solo piano pieces by composer Gioachino Rossini during the last years of his life, between the start of his last productive period in 1857, when he was 65, and his death at 76 in 1868. While Rossini was best known for his operas, he had ceased writing those in 1830.

== Volumes ==
The pieces are grouped into fourteen unpublished albums under this self-deprecating and ironic title. The ordering of the pieces in the albums does not reflect the sequence or the dates of their composition, which range from 1857 to shortly before Rossini's death in 1868. The title Péchés de vieillesse was given by Rossini only to volumes V to IX but has been applied to all. The collection is salon music, though of a refined order, meant to be performed in the privacy of Rossini's drawing room at Passy.

The volumes are shown below. Volumes I, II, III and XI are vocal music to piano accompaniment. Volumes IV, V, VI, VII, VIII, X and XII are music for solo piano. Volume IX is for chamber ensemble or solo piano. Volumes XIII and XIV comprise vocal and non-vocal music.

1. Album italiano
2. Album français
3. Morceaux réservés
4. Quatre hors d'œuvres et quatre mendiants
5. Album pour les enfants adolescents
6. Album pour les enfants dégourdis
7. Album de chaumière
8. Album de château
9. Album pour piano, violon, violoncello, harmonium et cor
10. Miscellanée pour piano
11. Miscellanée de musique vocale
12. Quelques riens pour album
13. Musique anodine (1857). Presented to his wife Olympe in gratitude for her care during his long intermittent illness.
14. Altri Péchés de vieillesse

After the composer's death in 1868, his widow, Olympe Pélissier, sold the entire collection, which was then auctioned in London, in 1878. The Société anonyme de publications périodique, Paris, was among the buyers, who sold publishing rights to the firm of Heugel. The edition was prepared by Auguste Vaucorbeil (1821–1884), director of the Paris Opéra, who reordered the pieces and gave them new picturesque titles, as Rossini's often nonsensical titles, which looked forward to Erik Satie's, were deemed unsuitable.

Critical editions of all the albums are in process of publication by the Fondazione Rossini, Pesaro, which conserves the original autograph manuscripts; they are distributed by Ricordi of Milan. The new editions restore Rossini's expressively precise musical notation and offer heretofore unpublished alternative versions of some Péchés.

== Arrangements ==
In 1918, Ottorino Respighi orchestrated a number of the piano pieces for the ballet La Boutique fantasque. In 1925, he arranged some more piano pieces, from Vol. XII (Quelques riens), as the orchestral suite Rossiniana. Benjamin Britten also used some of Rossini's themes in his orchestrally arranged suites "Soirées musicales", Op. 9, (1936) and "Matinées musicales", Op. 24 (1941).

== Recordings ==
From 2008 to 2018 Naxos Records released 11 albums with Péchés de vieillesse played by pianist Alessandro Marangoni.
