= Gioachino Rossini =

Italian opera composer (1792–1868)

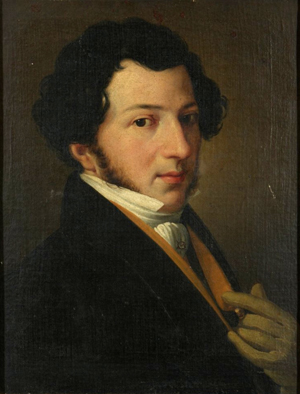
Rossini as a young man, c. 1810–1815

Gioachino (Note: According to his baptismal certificate, Rossini's first name was originally Giovacchino, and he is so referred to in at least one later document from his early years. In the Cambridge Companion to Rossini, the editor, Emanuele Senici, writes that Rossini spelt the name variously as Gioachino or Gioacchino in his early years, before finally settling on the former in the 1830s. The latter spelling is now more usual among bearers of the forename, but Rossini experts generally regard Gioachino as the appropriate form so far as the composer is concerned. Among the authorities favouring that spelling are the Fondazione G. Rossini in Pisa, the Grove Dictionary of Music and Musicians, and the Centro Italo-Americano per l'Opera (CIAO).) Antonio Rossini (Note: Pronunciation: UK: /ˌdʒoʊəˈkiːnoʊ rɒˈsiːni/, US: /- roʊˈ-, rəˈ-, rɔːˈ-/; Italian: [dʒoaˈkiːno anˈtɔːnjo rosˈsiːni].) (29 February 1792 – 13 November 1868) was an Italian composer and conductor of the late Classical and early Romantic eras. While he gained most of his fame for his 39 operas, he also wrote many pieces of chamber music, piano, and some sacred music. He set new standards for both comic and serious opera before retiring from large-scale composition while still in his thirties, at the height of his popularity.

Born in Pesaro to parents who were both musicians (his father a trumpeter, his mother a singer), Rossini began to compose by the age of twelve and was educated at music school in Bologna. His first opera was performed in Venice in 1810 when he was 18 years old. In 1815 he was engaged to write operas and manage theatres in Naples. In the period 1810–1823, he wrote 34 operas for the Italian stage that were performed in Venice, Milan, Ferrara, Naples and elsewhere; this productivity necessitated an almost formulaic approach for some components (such as overtures) and a certain amount of self-borrowing. During this period he produced his most popular works, including the comic operas L'italiana in Algeri, Il barbiere di Siviglia (known in English as The Barber of Seville) and La Cenerentola, which brought to a peak the opera buffa tradition he inherited from masters such as Wolfgang Amadeus Mozart, Domenico Cimarosa and Giovanni Paisiello. He also composed opera seria works such as Tancredi, Otello and Semiramide. All of these attracted admiration for their innovation in melody, harmonic and instrumental colour, and dramatic form. In 1824 he was contracted by the Opéra in Paris, for which he produced an opera to celebrate the coronation of Charles X, Il viaggio a Reims (half the music of which was later reused for his first opera in French, Le comte Ory), revisions of two of his Italian operas, Le siège de Corinthe and Moïse, and in 1829 his last opera, Guillaume Tell.

Rossini's withdrawal from opera for the last 40 years of his life has never been fully explained; contributory factors may have been ill-health, the wealth his success had brought him, and the rise of spectacular grand opera under composers such as Giacomo Meyerbeer. From the early 1830s to 1855, when he left Paris and was based in Bologna, Rossini wrote relatively little. On his return to Paris in 1855 he became renowned for his musical salons on Saturdays, regularly attended by musicians and the artistic and fashionable circles of Paris, for which he wrote the entertaining pieces Péchés de vieillesse. Guests included Franz Liszt, Anton Rubinstein, Giuseppe Verdi, Meyerbeer, and Joseph Joachim. Rossini's last major composition was his Petite messe solennelle (1863).

== Life and career ==
=== Early life ===
Rossini's parents

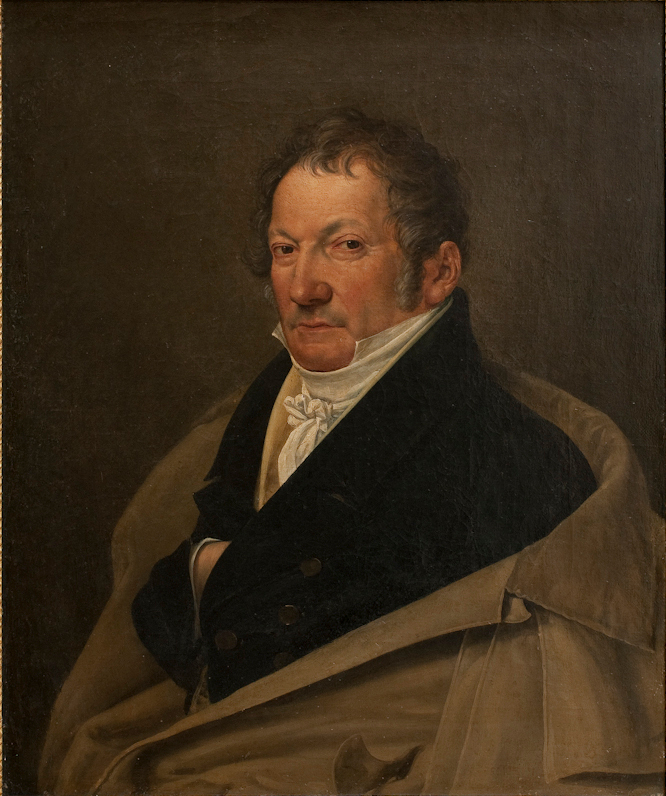
Giuseppe Rossini
(1758–1839)

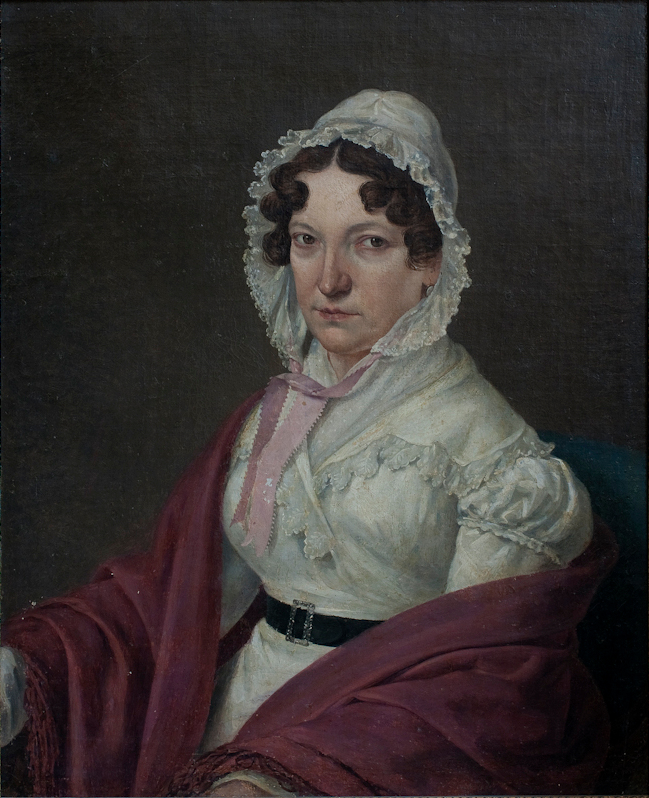
Anna Rossini
(1771–1827)

Rossini was born on 29 February 1792 in Pesaro, a town on the Adriatic coast of Italy that was then part of the Papal States. He was the only child of Giuseppe Rossini, a trumpeter and horn player, and his wife Anna, née Guidarini, a seamstress by trade, daughter of a baker. Giuseppe Rossini was charming but impetuous and feckless; the burden of supporting the family and raising the child fell mainly on Anna, with some help from her mother and mother-in-law. Stendhal, who published a colourful biography of Rossini in 1824, wrote:

Rossini's portion from his father, was the true native heirship of an Italian: a little music, a little religion, and a volume of Ariosto. The rest of his education was consigned to the legitimate school of southern youth, the society of his mother, the young singing girls of the company, those prima donnas in embryo, and the gossips of every village through which they passed. This was aided and refined by the musical barber and news-loving coffee-house keeper of the Papal village. (Note: Stendhal's Memoirs of Rossini, quoted here, is not the same as his Life of Rossini, and is believed to be compiled from the author's first draft. The musicologist Henry Prunières commented in the 20th century, "From the historical point of view this [i.e. the Memoirs] is the first and, without doubt, the best book written on Rossini in the first half of the nineteenth century. For Stendhalians, however, it is far from possessing the same interest as The Life of Rossini, which is an improvisation of genius, exuberant with life, bubbling over with ideas.")

Giuseppe was imprisoned at least twice: first in 1790 for insubordination to local authorities in a dispute about his employment as town trumpeter; and in 1799 and 1800 for republican activism and support of the troops of Napoleon against the Pope's Austrian backers. In 1798, when Rossini was aged six, his mother began a career as a professional singer in comic opera, and for a little over a decade was a considerable success in cities including Trieste and Bologna, before her untrained voice began to fail.

In 1802 the family moved to Lugo, near Ravenna, where Rossini received a good basic education in Italian, Latin and arithmetic as well as music. He studied the horn with his father and other music with a priest, Giuseppe Malerbe, whose extensive library contained works by Haydn and Mozart, both little known in Italy at the time, but inspirational to the young Rossini. He was a quick learner, and by the age of twelve, he had composed a set of six sonatas for four stringed instruments, which were performed under the aegis of a rich patron in 1804. (Note: The quartets were written for the unusual combination of two violins, one cello and one double bass. They achieved some popularity in 1825 and 1826 when five of the six were published in an arrangement for the traditional string quartet combination of two violins, one viola and one cello. The remaining sonata was not published until 1954.) Two years later he was admitted to the recently opened Liceo Musicale, Bologna, initially studying singing, cello and piano, and joining the composition class soon afterwards. He wrote some substantial works while a student, including a mass and a cantata, and after two years he was invited to continue his studies. He declined the offer: the strict academic regime of the Liceo had given him a solid compositional technique, but as his biographer Richard Osborne puts it, "his instinct to continue his education in the real world finally asserted itself".

While still at the Liceo, Rossini had performed in public as a singer and worked in theatres as a répétiteur and keyboard soloist. In 1810 at the request of the popular tenor Domenico Mombelli he wrote his first operatic score, a two-act operatic dramma serio, Demetrio e Polibio, to a libretto by Mombelli's wife. It was publicly staged in 1812, after the composer's first successes. Rossini and his parents concluded that his future lay in composing operas. The main operatic centre in northeastern Italy was Venice; under the tutelage of the composer Giovanni Morandi, a family friend, Rossini moved there in late 1810, when he was eighteen.

=== First operas: 1810–1815 ===
Rossini's first opera to be staged was La cambiale di matrimonio, (Note: "The Marriage Contract") a one-act comedy, given at the small Teatro San Moisè in November 1810. The piece was a great success, and Rossini received what then seemed to him a considerable sum: "forty scudi – an amount I had never seen brought together". He later described the San Moisè as an ideal theatre for a young composer learning his craft – "everything tended to facilitate the début of a novice composer": it had no chorus, and a small company of principals; its main repertoire consisted of one-act comic operas (farse), staged with modest scenery and minimal rehearsal. Rossini followed the success of his first piece with three more farse for the house: L'inganno felice (1812), (Note: "The Lucky Deception") La scala di seta (1812), (Note: "The Silken Ladder") and Il signor Bruschino (1813).

Rossini maintained his links with Bologna, where in 1811 he had a success directing Haydn's The Seasons, and a failure with his first full-length opera, L'equivoco stravagante. (Note: "The Extravagant Misunderstanding") He also worked for opera houses in Ferrara and Rome. In mid-1812 he received a commission from La Scala, Milan, where his two-act comedy La pietra del paragone (Note: "The Touchstone") ran for fifty-three performances, a considerable run for the time, which brought him not only financial benefits, but exemption from military service and the title of maestro di cartello – a composer whose name on advertising posters guaranteed a full house. The following year his first opera seria, Tancredi, did well at La Fenice in Venice, and even better at Ferrara, with a rewritten, tragic ending. The success of Tancredi made Rossini's name known internationally; productions of the opera followed in London (1820) and New York (1825). Within weeks of Tancredi, Rossini had another box-office success with his comedy L'italiana in Algeri, (Note: "The Italian Girl in Algiers") composed in great haste and premiered in May 1813.

1814 was a less remarkable year for the rising composer, neither Il turco in Italia (Note: "The Turk in Italy") or Sigismondo pleasing the Milanese or Venetian public, respectively. 1815 marked an important stage in Rossini's career. In May he moved to Naples, to take up the post of director of music for the royal theatres. These included the Teatro di San Carlo, the city's leading opera house; its manager Domenico Barbaia was to be an important influence on the composer's career there.

=== Naples and Il barbiere: 1815–1820 ===
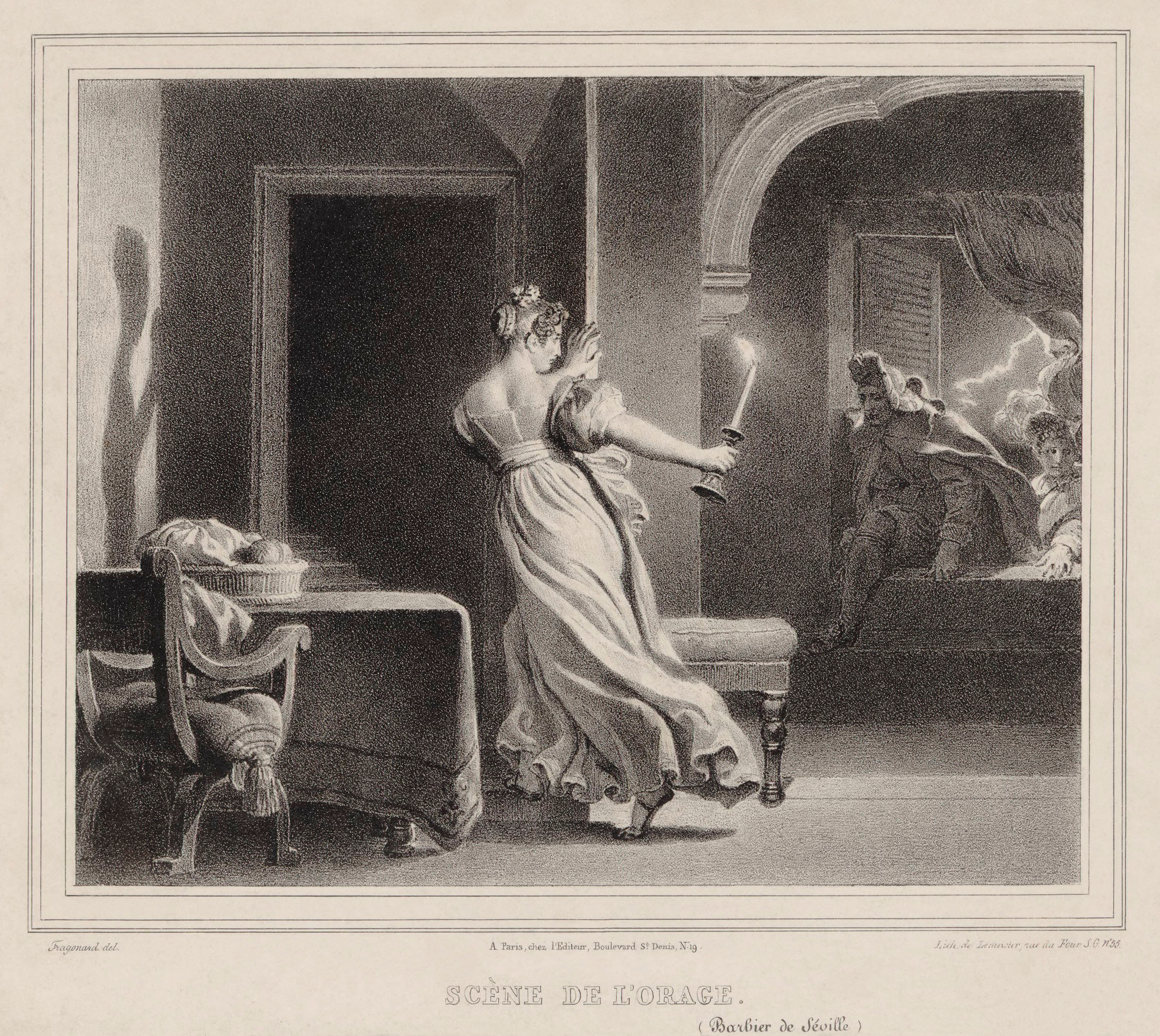
The storm scene from Il barbiere in an 1830 lithograph by Alexandre Fragonard

The musical establishment of Naples was not immediately welcoming to Rossini, who was seen as an intruder into its cherished operatic traditions. The city had once been the operatic capital of Europe; the memory of Cimarosa was revered and Paisiello was still living, but there were no local composers of any stature to follow them, and Rossini quickly won the public and critics round. Rossini's first work for the San Carlo, Elisabetta, regina d'Inghilterra (Note: "Elizabeth, Queen of England") was a dramma per musica in two acts, in which he reused substantial sections of his earlier works, unfamiliar to the local public. The Rossini scholars Philip Gossett and Patricia Brauner write, "It is as if Rossini wished to present himself to the Neapolitan public by offering a selection of the best music from operas unlikely to be revived in Naples." The new opera was received with tremendous enthusiasm, as was the Neapolitan premiere of L'italiana in Algeri, and Rossini's position in Naples was assured.

For the first time, Rossini was able to write regularly for a resident company of first-rate singers and a fine orchestra, with adequate rehearsals, and schedules that made it unnecessary to compose in a rush to meet deadlines. Between 1815 and 1822 he composed eighteen more operas: nine for Naples and nine for opera houses in other cities. In 1816, for the Teatro Argentina in Rome, he composed the opera that was to become his best-known: Il barbiere di Siviglia (The Barber of Seville). There was already a popular opera of that title by Paisiello, and Rossini's version was originally given the same title as its hero, Almaviva. (Note: In full, Almaviva, ossia L'inutile precauzione – Almaviva, or the Useless Precaution.) Despite an unsuccessful opening night, with mishaps on stage and many pro-Paisiello and anti-Rossini audience members, the opera quickly became a success, and by the time of its first revival, in Bologna a few months later, it was billed by its present Italian title and it rapidly eclipsed Paisiello's setting. (Note: Paisiello's version had vanished from the operatic repertory by the 1820s, along with his other once-popular operas, such as Nina.)

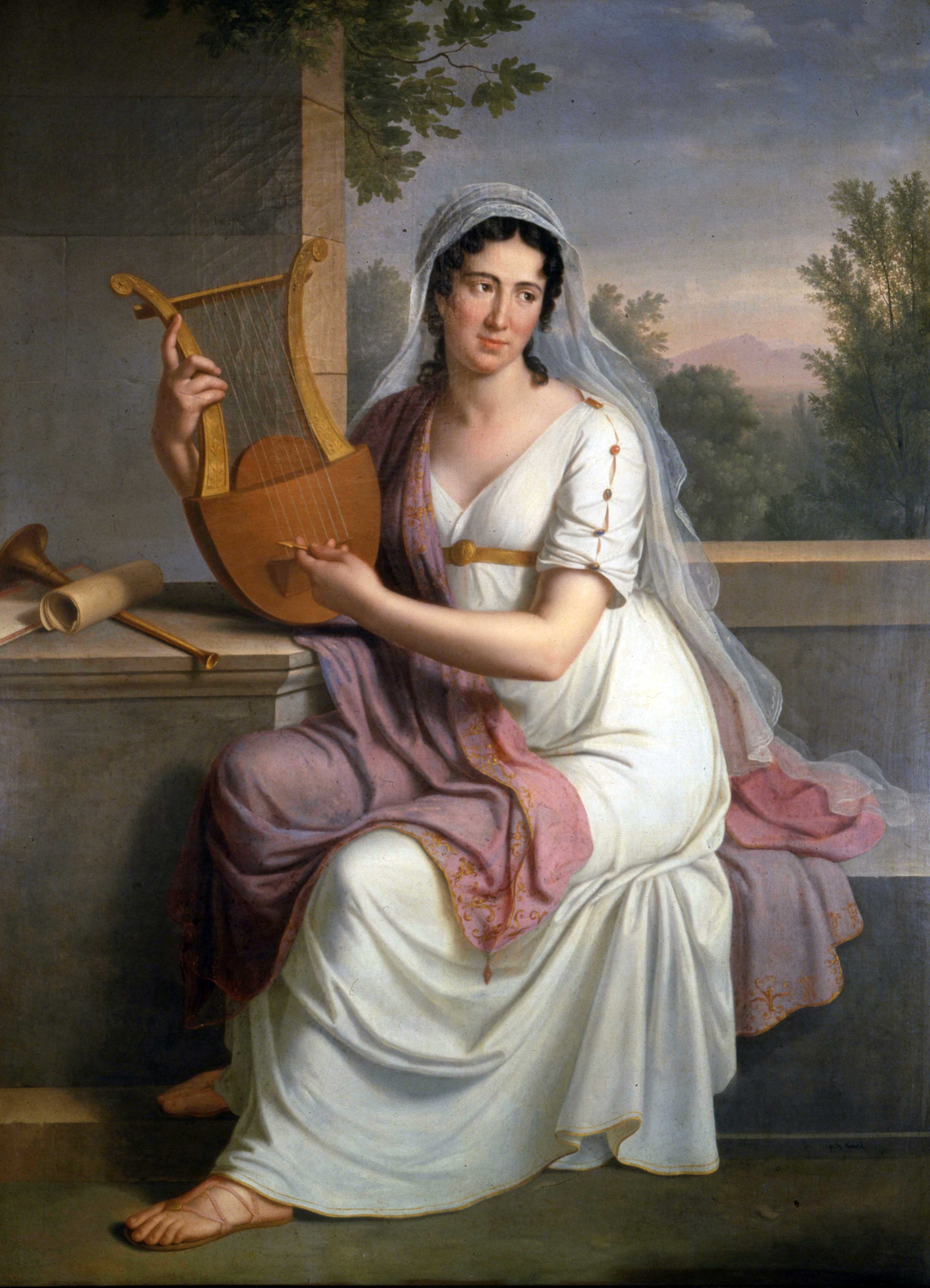
Isabella Colbran, prima donna of the Teatro San Carlo, who married Rossini in 1822

Rossini's operas for the Teatro San Carlo were substantial, mainly serious pieces. His Otello (1816) provoked Lord Byron to write, "They have been crucifying Othello into an opera: music good, but lugubrious – but as for the words!" Nonetheless, the piece proved generally popular and held the stage in frequent revivals until it was overshadowed by Verdi's version, seven decades later. Among his other works for the house were Mosè in Egitto, based on the biblical story of Moses and the Exodus from Egypt (1818), and La donna del lago, from Sir Walter Scott's poem The Lady of the Lake (1819). For La Scala he wrote the opera semiseria La gazza ladra (1817), (Note: "The Thieving Magpie") and for Rome his version of the Cinderella story, La Cenerentola (1817). In 1817 came the first performance of one of his operas (L'Italiana) at the Theâtre-Italien in Paris; its success led to others of his operas being staged there, and eventually to his contract in Paris from 1824 to 1830.

Rossini kept his personal life as private as possible, but he was known for his susceptibility to singers in the companies he worked with. Among his lovers in his early years were Ester Mombelli (Domenico's daughter) and Maria Marcolini of the Bologna company. By far the most important of these relationships – both personal and professional – was with Isabella Colbran, prima donna of the Teatro San Carlo (and former mistress of Barbaia). Rossini had heard her sing in Bologna in 1807, and when he moved to Naples he wrote a succession of important roles for her in opere serie.

=== Vienna and London: 1820–1824 ===
By the early 1820s, Rossini was beginning to tire of Naples. The failure of his operatic tragedy Ermione the previous year convinced him that he and the Neapolitan audiences had had enough of each other. An insurrection in Naples against the monarchy, though quickly crushed, unsettled Rossini; when Barbaia signed a contract to take the company to Vienna, Rossini was glad to join them, but did not reveal to Barbaia that he had no intention of returning to Naples afterwards. He travelled with Colbran, in March 1822, breaking their journey at Bologna, where they were married in the presence of his parents in a small church in Castenaso a few miles from the city. The bride was thirty-seven, the groom thirty. (Note: Stendhal, whose dislike of Colbran is undisguised in his 1824 biography of Rossini, put the bride's age at 40 to 50, and suggested that Rossini married her for her (considerable) money.)

In Vienna, Rossini received a hero's welcome; his biographers describe it as "unprecedentedly feverish enthusiasm", "Rossini fever", and "near hysteria". The authoritarian chancellor of the Austrian Empire, Metternich, liked Rossini's music, and thought it free of all potential revolutionary or republican associations. He was therefore happy to permit the San Carlo company to perform the composer's operas. In a three-month season they played six of them, to audiences so enthusiastic that Beethoven's assistant, Anton Schindler, described it as "an idolatrous orgy".

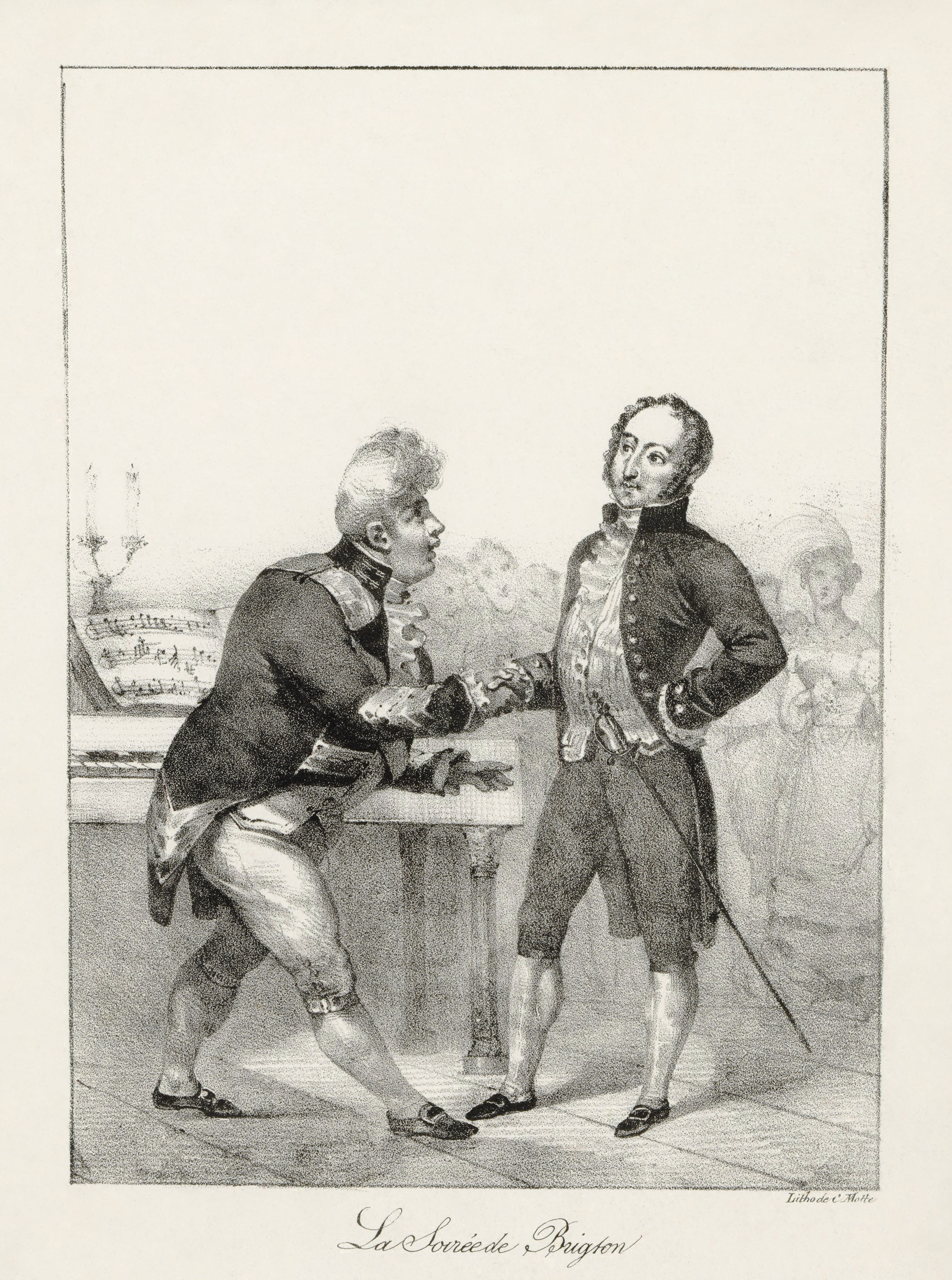
George IV (left) greeting Rossini at the Brighton Pavilion, 1823

While in Vienna Rossini heard Beethoven's Eroica symphony, and was so moved that he determined to meet the reclusive composer. He finally managed to do so, and later described the encounter to many people, including Eduard Hanslick and Richard Wagner. He recalled that although conversation was hampered by Beethoven's deafness and Rossini's ignorance of German, Beethoven made it plain that he thought Rossini's talents were not for serious opera, and that "above all" he should "do more Barbiere" (Barbers). (Note: "Vor allem machen Sie noch viele Barbiere".)

After the Vienna season Rossini returned to Castenaso to work with his librettist, Gaetano Rossi, on Semiramide, commissioned by La Fenice. It was premiered in February 1823, his last work for the Italian theatre. Colbran starred, but it was clear to everyone that her voice was in serious decline, and Semiramide ended her career in Italy. The work survived that one major disadvantage, and entered the international operatic repertory, remaining popular throughout the 19th century; in Richard Osborne's words, it brought "[Rossini's] Italian career to a spectacular close."

In November 1823 Rossini and Colbran set off for London, where a lucrative contract had been offered. They stopped for four weeks en route in Paris. Although he was not as feverishly acclaimed by the Parisians as he had been in Vienna, he nevertheless had an exceptionally welcoming reception from the musical establishment and the public. When he attended a performance of Il barbiere at the Théâtre-Italien he was applauded, dragged onto the stage, and serenaded by the musicians. A banquet was given for him and his wife, attended by leading French composers and artists, and he found the cultural climate of Paris congenial.

At the end of the year Rossini arrived in London, where he was received and made much of by King George IV, although the composer was by now unimpressed by royalty and aristocracy. Rossini and Colbran had signed contracts for an opera season at the King's Theatre in the Haymarket. Her vocal shortcomings were a serious liability, and she reluctantly retired from performing. Public opinion was not improved by Rossini's failure to provide a new opera, as promised. The impresario Vincenzo Benelli defaulted on his contract with the composer, but this was not known to the London press and public, who blamed Rossini.

In a 2003 biography of the composer, Gaia Servadio comments that Rossini and England were not made for each other. He was prostrated by the Channel crossing and was unlikely to be enthused by the English weather or English cooking. Although his stay in London was financially rewarding – the British press reported disapprovingly that he had earned over £30,000 (Note: A sum equal to £2,847,621 today) – he was happy to sign a contract at the French embassy in London to return to Paris, where he had felt much more at home.

=== Paris and final operas: 1824–1829 ===
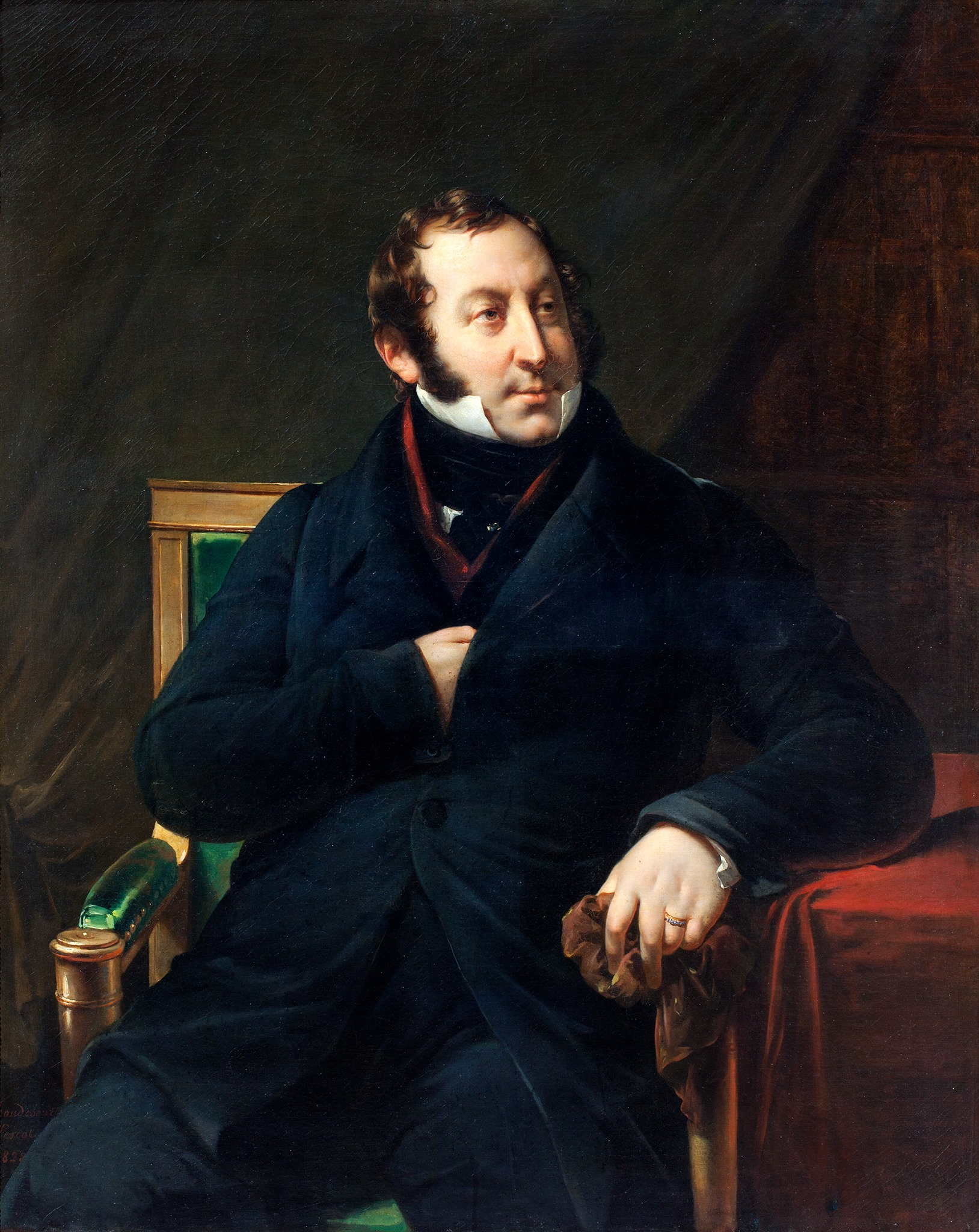
Rossini, painted in Paris in 1828 by Hortense Haudebourt-Lescot

Rossini's new, and highly remunerative, contract with the French government was negotiated under Louis XVIII, who died in September 1824, soon after Rossini's arrival in Paris. It had been agreed that the composer would produce one grand opera for the Académie Royale de Musique and either an opera buffa or an opera semiseria for the Théâtre-Italien. He was also to help run the latter theatre and revise one of his earlier works for revival there. The death of the king and the accession of Charles X changed Rossini's plans, and his first new work for Paris was Il viaggio a Reims, (Note: "The Journey to Rheims") an operatic entertainment given in June 1825 to celebrate Charles's coronation. It was Rossini's last opera with an Italian libretto. He permitted only four performances of the piece, (Note: The score was reconstructed from rediscovered manuscripts in the 1970s, and has since been staged and recorded.) intending to reuse the best of the music in a less ephemeral opera. About half the score of Le comte Ory (1828) is from the earlier work.

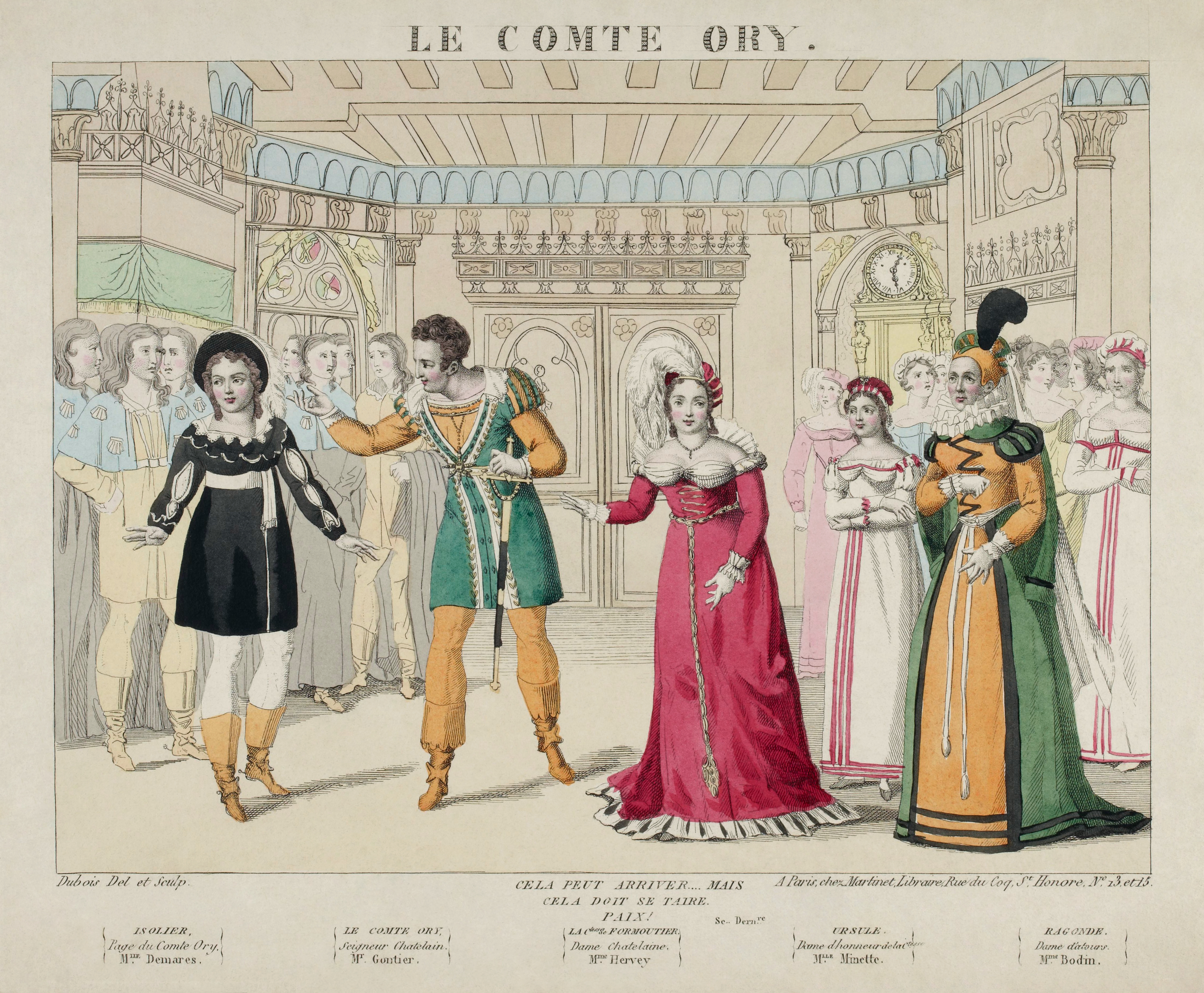
Isolier, Ory, Adèle and Ragonde, in Le comte Ory

Colbran's enforced retirement put a strain on the Rossinis' marriage, leaving her unoccupied while he continued to be the centre of musical attention and constantly in demand. She consoled herself with what Servadio describes as "a new pleasure in shopping"; for Rossini, Paris offered continual gourmet delights, as his increasingly rotund shape began to reflect. (Note: Several haute cuisine dishes were named after Rossini; some of them later featured on menus at his house after he returned to live in Paris in the 1850s. They included Crema alla Rossini, Consommé Rossini; Frittata alla Rossini, Tournedos Rossini, and were rich dishes that generally involved the use of truffles and foie gras.)

The first of the four operas Rossini wrote to French librettos were Le siège de Corinthe (Note: "The Siege of Corinth") (1826) and Moïse et Pharaon (Note: "Moses and Pharaoh") (1827). Both were substantial reworkings of pieces written for Naples: Maometto II and Mosè in Egitto. Rossini took great care before beginning work on the first, learning to speak French and familiarising himself with traditional French operatic ways of declaiming the language. As well as dropping some of the original music that was in an ornate style unfashionable in Paris, Rossini accommodated local preferences by adding dances, hymn-like numbers and a greater role for the chorus.

Rossini's mother, Anna, died in 1827; he had been devoted to her, and he felt her loss deeply. She and Colbran had never got on well, and Servadio suggests that after Anna died Rossini came to resent the surviving woman in his life.

In 1828 Rossini wrote Le comte Ory, his only French-language comic opera. His determination to reuse music from Il viaggio a Reims caused problems for his librettists, who had to adapt their original plot and write French words to fit existing Italian numbers, but the opera was a success, and was seen in London within six months of the Paris premiere, and in New York in 1831. The following year Rossini wrote his long-awaited French grand opera, Guillaume Tell, based on Friedrich Schiller's 1804 play which drew on the William Tell legend.

=== Early retirement: 1830–1855 ===
Guillaume Tell was well received. The orchestra and singers gathered outside Rossini's house after the premiere and performed the rousing finale to the second act in his honour. The newspaper Le Globe commented that a new era of music had begun. Gaetano Donizetti remarked that the first and last acts of the opera were written by Rossini, but the middle act was written by God. The work was an undoubted success, without being a smash hit; the public took some time in getting to grips with it, and some singers found it too demanding. It nonetheless was produced abroad within months of the premiere, (Note: The London production was "selected and adapted to the English stage" by Henry Bishop and J. R. Planché, "with taste and ability" according to The Times, and was given at Drury Lane in May 1830 under the title Hofer, the Tell of the Tyrol.) and there was no suspicion that it would be the composer's last opera.

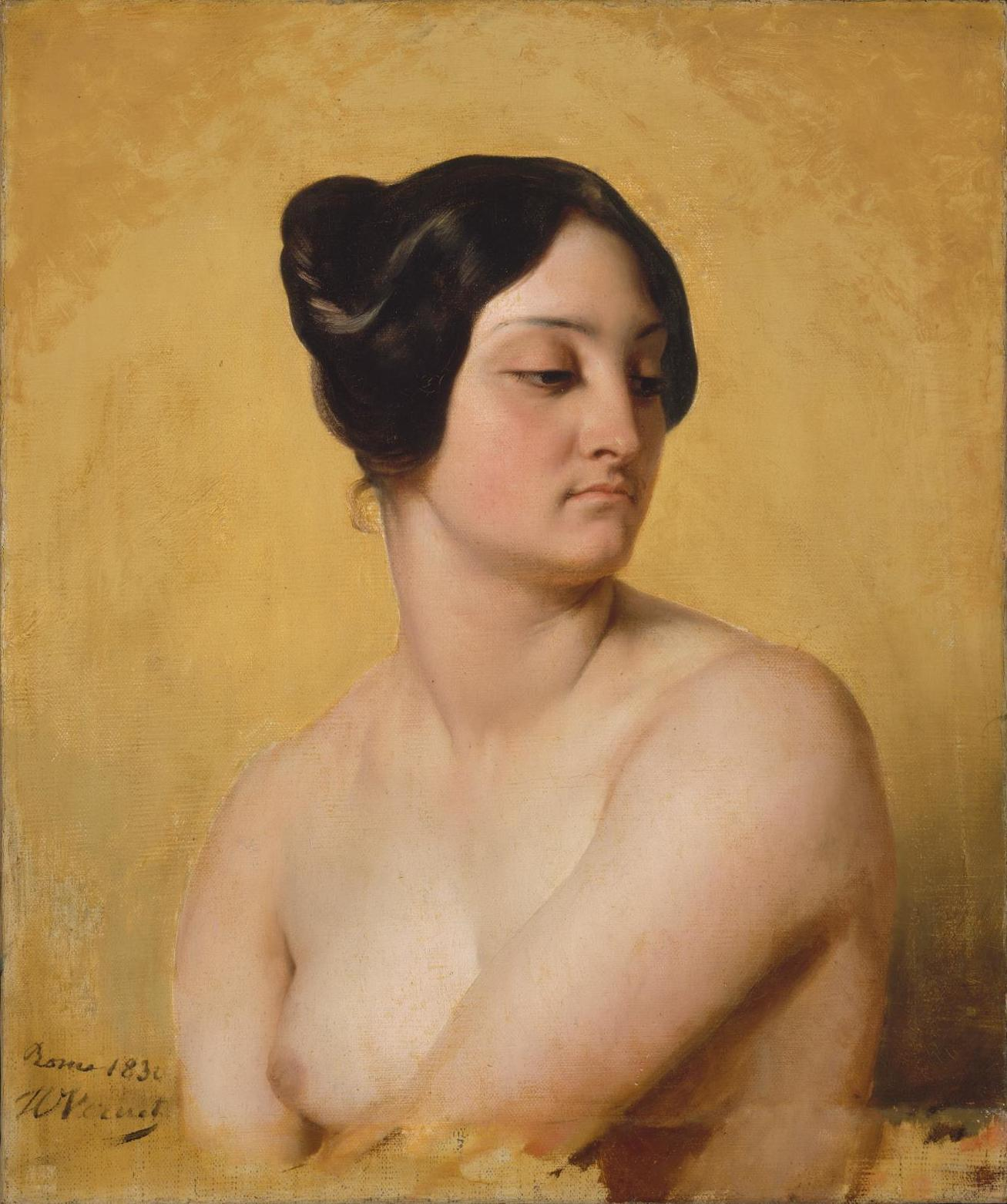
Olympe Pélissier in 1830

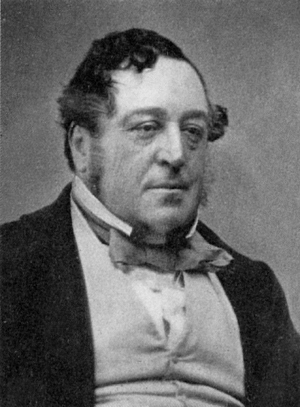
Rossini, c. 1850

Jointly with Semiramide, Guillaume Tell is Rossini's longest opera, at three hours and forty-five minutes, and the effort of composing it left him exhausted. Although within a year he was planning an operatic treatment of the Faust story, events and ill health overtook him. After the opening of Guillaume Tell the Rossinis had left Paris and were staying in Castenaso. Within a year events in Paris had Rossini hurrying back. Charles X was overthrown in a revolution in July 1830, and the new administration, headed by Louis Philippe I, announced radical cutbacks in government spending. Among the cuts was Rossini's lifetime annuity, won after hard negotiation with the previous regime. Attempting to restore the annuity was one of Rossini's reasons for returning. The other was to be with his new mistress, Olympe Pélissier. He left Colbran in Castenaso; she never returned to Paris and they never lived together again.

The reasons for Rossini's withdrawal from opera have been continually discussed during and since his lifetime. Some have supposed that aged thirty-seven and in variable health, having negotiated a sizeable annuity from the French government, and having written thirty-nine operas, he simply planned to retire and kept to that plan. In a 1934 study of the composer, the critic Francis Toye coined the phrase "The Great Renunciation", and called Rossini's retirement a "phenomenon unique in the history of music and difficult to parallel in the whole history of art":

Is there any other artist who thus deliberately, in the very prime of life, renounced that form of artistic production which had made him famous throughout the civilized world?

The poet Heine compared Rossini's retirement with Shakespeare's withdrawal from writing: two geniuses recognising when they had accomplished the unsurpassable and not seeking to follow it. (Note: Heine added that the title "The Swan of Pesaro", sometimes applied to Rossini, was clearly wrong: "Swans sing at the end of their lives, but Rossini has become silent in the middle of his.") Others, then and later, suggested that Rossini had retired because of pique at the successes of Giacomo Meyerbeer and Fromental Halévy in the genre of grand opéra. (Note: These suggestions often took on a tinge of Jew-hatred – for example the assertion that Rossini had retired "until the Jews finished their Sabbath" (a quip sometimes, without foundation, attributed to Rossini himself), or Richard Wagner's crack (in his 1851 Opera and Drama), referring to the friendships of the Rothschild family with both Rossini and Meyerbeer (who stemmed from a banking family): "[Rossini] never could have dreamt that it would someday occur to the Bankers, for whom he had always made their music, to make it for themselves." Such allegations were wide of the mark; Rossini was on friendly terms with Meyerbeer, visiting him regularly, and wrote a memorial elegy for male voice choir on Meyerbeer's death in 1864, "Pleure, muse sublime!" ("Weep, Sublime Muse!")) Modern Rossini scholarship has generally discounted such theories, maintaining that Rossini had no intention of renouncing operatic composition, and that circumstances rather than personal choice made Guillaume Tell his last opera. Gossett and Richard Osborne suggest that illness may have been a major factor in Rossini's retirement. From about this time, Rossini had intermittent bad health, both physical and mental. He had contracted gonorrhoea in earlier years, which later led to painful side-effects, from urethritis to arthritis; he suffered from bouts of debilitating depression, which commentators have linked to several possible causes: cyclothymia, or bipolar disorder, or reaction to his mother's death. (Note: Daniel W. Schwartz hypothesises that Rossini's failure to write any more operas after 1829 was due to "narcissistic withdrawal and depression" following his mother's death two years earlier. Richard Osborne rejects this as "idle speculation", "less well researched" than other psychological theories.)

For the next twenty-five years following Guillaume Tell Rossini composed little, although Gossett comments that his comparatively few compositions from the 1830s and 1840s show no falling off in musical inspiration. They include the Soirées musicales (1830–1835: a set of twelve songs for solo or duet voices and piano) and his Stabat Mater (begun in 1831 and completed in 1841). (Note: The first version of the Stabat Mater consisted of six sections by Rossini and six by his friend Giovanni Tadolini. Under pressure from his publisher in Paris, Rossini later replaced Tadolini's contributions and the all-Rossini version was published in 1841.) After winning his fight with the government over his annuity in 1835 Rossini left Paris and settled in Bologna. His return to Paris in 1843 for medical treatment by Jean Civiale sparked hopes that he might produce a new grand opera – it was rumoured that Eugène Scribe was preparing a libretto for him about Joan of Arc. The Opéra was moved to present a French version of Otello in 1844 which also included material from some of the composer's earlier operas. It is unclear to what extent – if at all – Rossini was involved with this production, which was in the event poorly received. More controversial was the pasticcio opera of Robert Bruce (1846), in which Rossini, by then returned to Bologna, closely cooperated by selecting music from his past operas which had not yet been performed in Paris, notably La donna del lago. The Opéra sought to present Robert as a new Rossini opera. But although Othello could at least claim to be genuine, canonic Rossini, the historian Mark Everist notes that detractors argued that Robert was simply "fake goods, and from a bygone era at that"; he cites Théophile Gautier regretting that "the lack of unity could have been masked by a superior performance; unfortunately the tradition of Rossini's music was lost at the Opéra a long time ago."

The period after 1835 saw Rossini's formal separation from his wife, who remained at Castenaso (1837), and the death of his father at the age of eighty (1839). In 1845 Colbran became seriously ill, and in September Rossini travelled to visit her; a month later she died. The following year Rossini and Pélissier were married in Bologna. The events of the Year of Revolution in 1848 led Rossini to move away from the Bologna area, where he felt threatened by insurrection, and to make Florence his base, which it remained until 1855.

By the early 1850s Rossini's mental and physical health had deteriorated to the point where his wife and friends feared for his sanity or his life. By the middle of the decade, it was clear that he needed to return to Paris for the most advanced medical care then available. In April 1855 the Rossinis set off for their final journey from Italy to France. Rossini returned to Paris aged sixty-three and made it his home for the rest of his life.

=== Sins of old age: 1855–1868 ===
I offer these modest songs to my dear wife Olympe as a simple testimony of gratitude for the affectionate, intelligent care which she lavished on me during my overlong and terrible illness.

— Dedication of Musique anodine, 1857

Gossett observes that although an account of Rossini's life between 1830 and 1855 makes depressing reading, it is "no exaggeration to say that, in Paris, Rossini returned to life". He recovered his health and joie de vivre. Once settled in Paris he maintained two homes: a flat in the rue de la Chaussée-d'Antin, a smart central area, and a neo-classical villa built for him in Passy, a commune now absorbed into the city, but then semi-rural. He and his wife established a salon that became internationally famous. The first of their Saturday evening gatherings – the samedi soirs – was held in December 1858, and the last, two months before he died in 1868.

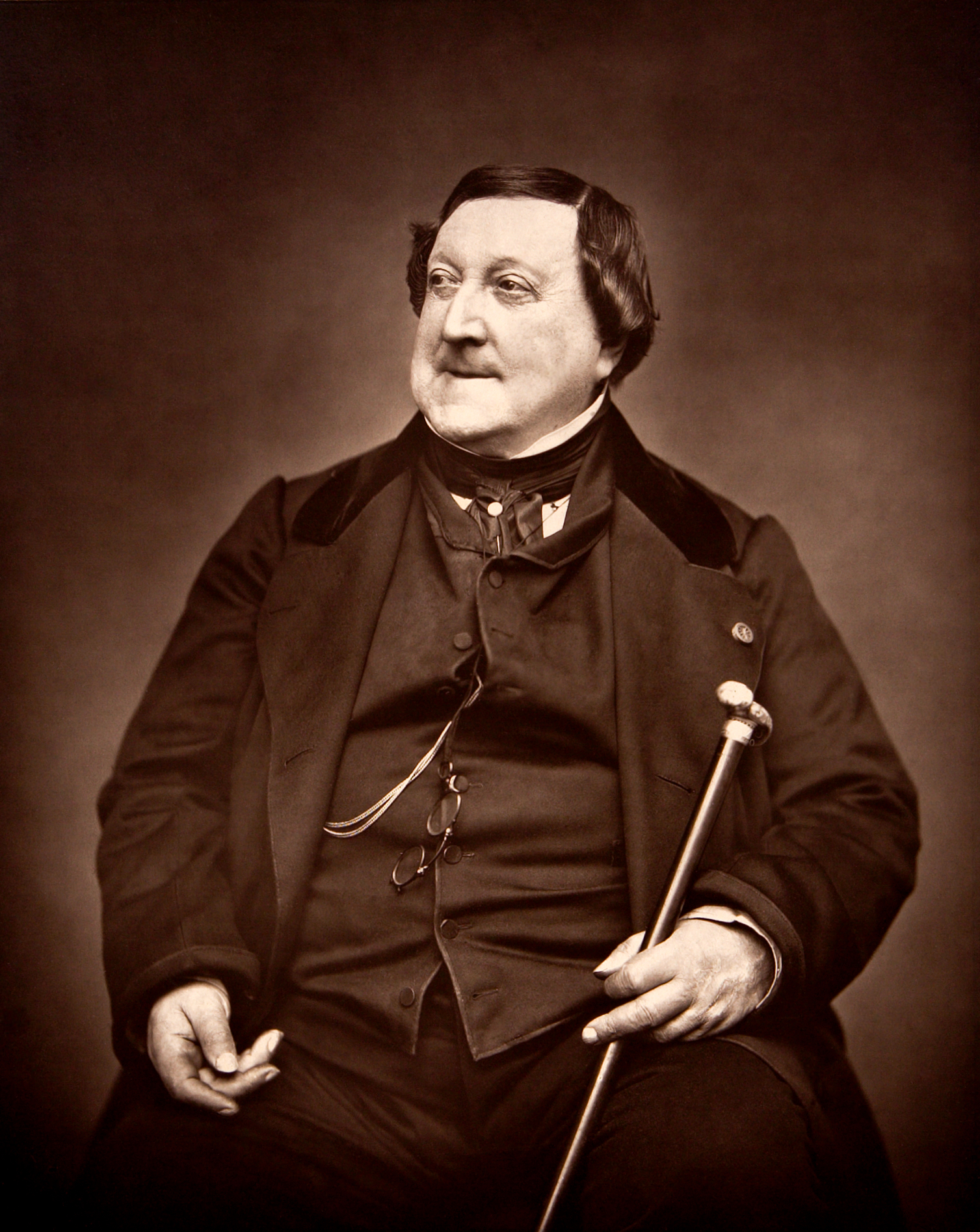
Rossini in 1865, by Étienne Carjat

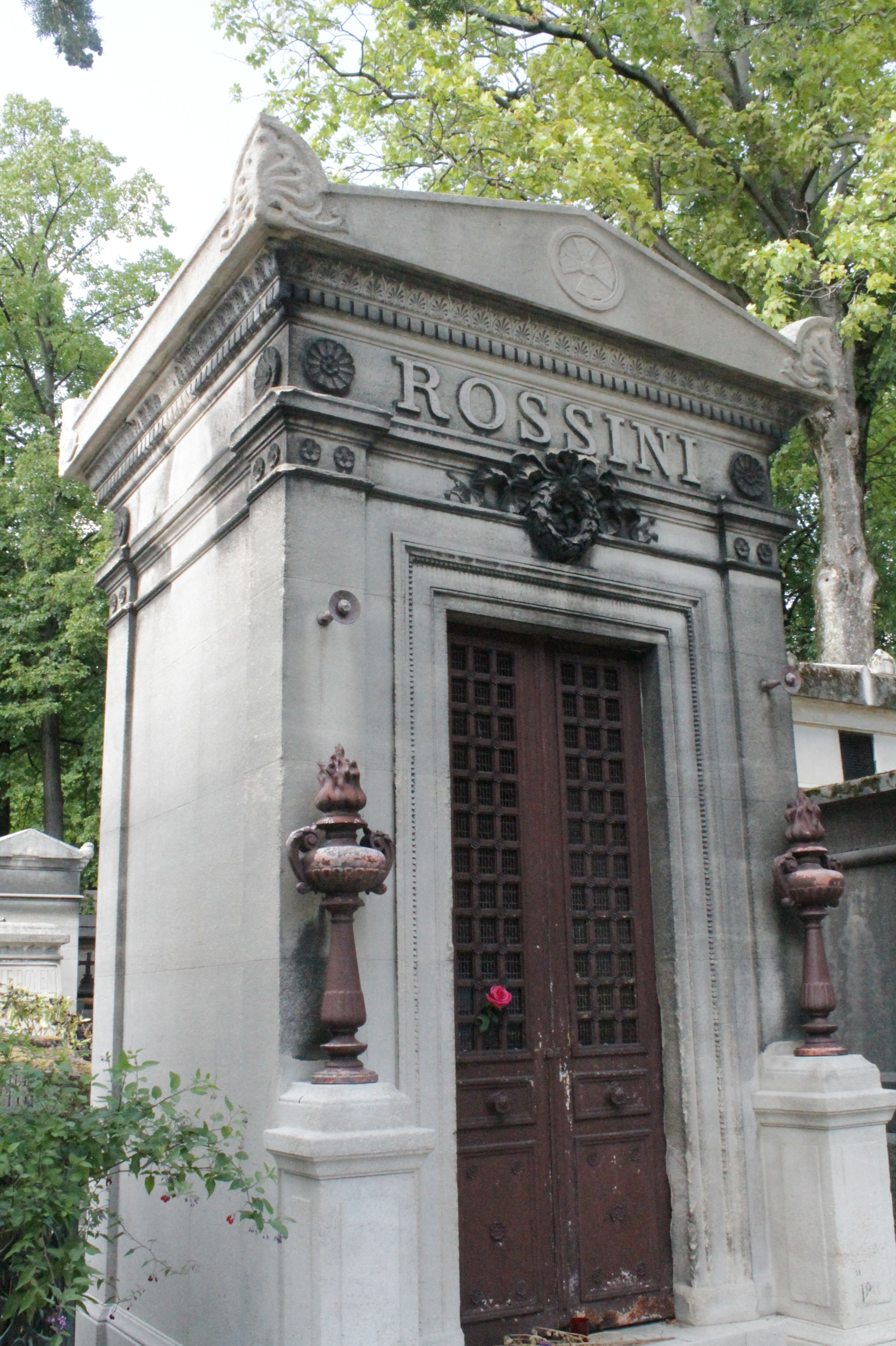
Rossini's original grave monument, Père Lachaise Cemetery, Paris

Rossini began composing again. His music from his final decade was not generally intended for public performance, and he did not usually put dates of composition on the manuscripts. Consequently, musicologists have found it difficult to give definite dates for his late works, but the first, or among the first, was the song cycle Musique anodine, dedicated to his wife and presented to her in April 1857. For their weekly salons he produced more than 150 pieces, including songs, solo piano pieces, and chamber works for many different combinations of instruments. He referred to them as his Péchés de vieillesse – "sins of old age". The salons were held both at Beau Séjour – the Passy villa – and, in the winter, at the Paris flat. Such gatherings were a regular feature of Parisian life – the writer James Penrose has observed that the well-connected could easily attend different salons almost every night of the week – but the Rossinis' samedi soirs quickly became the most sought after: "an invitation was the city's highest social prize." The music, carefully chosen by Rossini, was not only his own but included works by Pergolesi, Haydn and Mozart and modern pieces by some of his guests. Among the composers who attended the salons, and sometimes performed, were Auber, Gounod, Liszt, Rubinstein, Meyerbeer, and Verdi. Rossini liked to call himself a fourth-class pianist, but the many famous pianists who attended the samedi soirs were dazzled by his playing. Violinists such as Pablo Sarasate and Joseph Joachim and the leading singers of the day were regular guests. In 1860, Wagner visited Rossini via an introduction from Rossini's friend Edmond Michotte who some forty-five years later wrote his account of the genial conversation between the two composers. (Note: Michotte was later to bequeath an extensive collection of scores, documents and other Rossiniana to the Library of the Royal Conservatory of Brussels.)

One of Rossini's few late works intended to be given in public was his Petite messe solennelle, first performed in 1864. In the same year Rossini was made a grand officer of the Legion of Honour by Napoleon III.

After a short illness, and an unsuccessful operation to treat colorectal cancer, Rossini died at Passy on 13 November 1868 at the age of seventy-six. He left Olympe a life interest in his estate, which after her death, ten years later, passed to the Commune of Pesaro for the establishment of a Liceo Musicale, and funded a home for retired opera singers in Paris. After a funeral service attended by more than four thousand people at the church of Sainte-Trinité, Paris, Rossini's body was interred at the Père Lachaise Cemetery. In 1887 his remains were moved to the basilica of Santa Croce, Florence.

== Music ==
=== "The Code Rossini" ===
"Tous les genres sont bons, hors le genre ennuyeux". (Note: "All genres are good except the boring ones".)

— Rossini, in a letter of 1868 (citing Voltaire)

The writer Julian Budden, noting the formulas adopted early on by Rossini in his career and consistently followed by him thereafter as regards overtures, arias, structures and ensembles, has called them "the Code Rossini" in a reference to the Code Napoléon, the legal system established by the French Emperor. Rossini's overall style may indeed have been influenced more directly by the French: the historian John Rosselli suggests that French rule in Italy at the start of the 19th century meant that "music had taken on new military qualities of attack, noise and speed – to be heard in Rossini." Rossini's approach to opera was inevitably tempered by changing tastes and audience demands. The formal "classicist" libretti of Metastasio which had underpinned late 18th century opera seria were replaced by subjects more to the taste of the age of Romanticism, with stories demanding stronger characterisation and quicker action; a jobbing composer needed to meet these demands or fail. Rossini's strategies met this reality. A formulaic approach was logistically indispensable for Rossini's career, at least at the start: in the seven years 1812–1819, he wrote 27 operas, often at extremely short notice. For La Cenerentola (1817), for example, he had just over three weeks to write the music before the première.

Such pressures led to a further significant element of Rossini's compositional procedures, not included in Budden's "Code", namely, recycling. The composer often transferred a successful overture to subsequent operas: thus the overture to La pietra del paragone was later used for the opera seria Tancredi (1813), and (in the other direction) the overture to Aureliano in Palmira (1813) ended as (and is today known as) the overture to the comedy Il barbiere di Siviglia (The Barber of Seville). He also liberally re-employed arias and other sequences in later works. Spike Hughes notes that of the twenty-six numbers of Eduardo e Cristina, produced in Venice in 1817, nineteen were lifted from previous works. "The audience ... were remarkably good-humoured ... and asked slyly why the libretto had been changed since the last performance". Rossini expressed his disgust when the publisher Giovanni Ricordi issued a complete edition of his works in the 1850s: "The same pieces will be found several times, for I thought I had the right to remove from my fiascos those pieces which seemed best, to rescue them from shipwreck ... A fiasco seemed to be good and dead, and now look they've resuscitated them all!"

==== Overtures ====
Philip Gossett notes that Rossini "was from the outset a consummate composer of overtures". His basic formula for these remained constant throughout his career: Gossett characterises them as "sonata movements without development sections, usually preceded by a slow introduction" with "clear melodies, exuberant rhythms [and] simple harmonic structure" and a crescendo climax. Richard Taruskin also notes that the second theme is always announced in a woodwind solo, whose "catchiness" "etch[es] a distinct profile in the aural memory", and that the richness and inventiveness of his handling of the orchestra, even in these early works, marks the start of "[t]he great nineteenth-century flowering of orchestration."

==== Arias ====
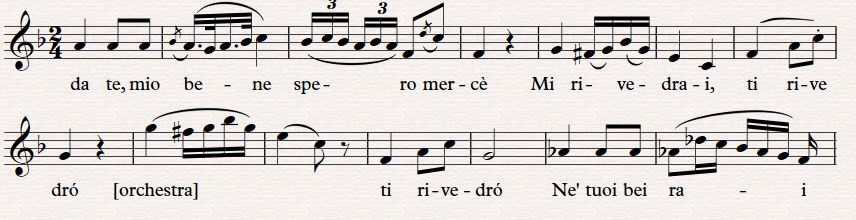
Extract from "Di tanti palpiti" (Tancredi)

Rossini's handling of arias (and duets) in cavatina style marked a development from the eighteenth-century commonplace of recitative and aria. In the words of Rosselli, in Rossini's hands, "the aria became an engine for releasing emotion". Rossini's typical aria structure involved a lyrical introduction ("cantabile") and a more intensive, brilliant, conclusion ("cabaletta"). This model could be adapted in various ways so as to forward the plot (as opposed to the typical eighteenth-century handling which resulted in the action coming to a halt as the requisite repeats of the da capo aria were undertaken). For example, they could be punctuated by comments from other characters (a convention known as "pertichini"), or the chorus could intervene between the cantabile and the cabaletta so as to fire up the soloist. If such developments were not necessarily Rossini's own invention, he nevertheless made them his own by his expert handling of them. A landmark in this context is the cavatina "Di tanti palpiti" from Tancredi, which both Taruskin and Gossett (amongst others) single out as transformative, "the most famous aria Rossini ever wrote", with a "melody that seems to capture the melodic beauty and innocence characteristic of Italian opera." (Note: On its notoriety, Rossini wrote of himself self-mockingly in a letter of 1865 to his publisher Ricordi as "the author of the too-famous cavatina 'Di tanti palpiti.' " Another clue to its familiarity with 19th-century audiences is that Richard Wagner made fun of the aria with a deliberate quote from it in the Tailor's Chorus in Die Meistersinger (1868).) Both writers point out the typical Rossinian touch of avoiding an "expected" cadence in the aria by a sudden shift from the home key of F to that of A flat (see example); Taruskin notes the implicit pun, as the words talk of returning, but the music moves in a new direction. The influence was lasting; Gossett notes how the Rossinian cabaletta style continued to inform Italian opera as late as Giuseppe Verdi's Aida (1871).

==== Structure ====
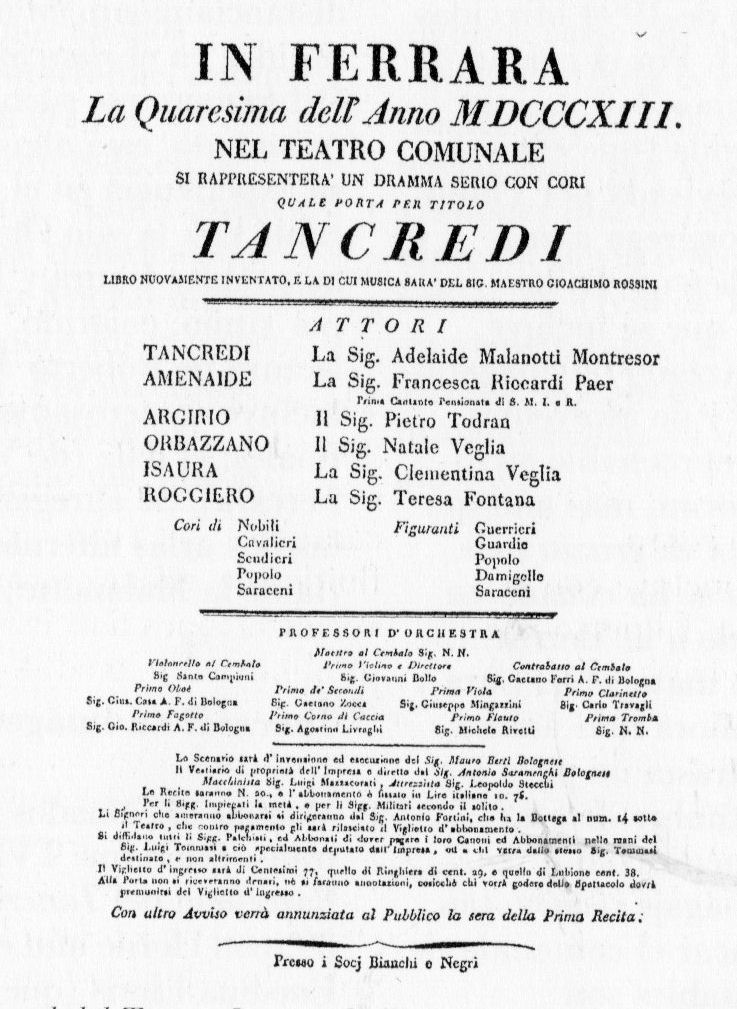
Poster for a performance of Tancredi in Ferrara, 1813

Such structural integration of the forms of vocal music with the dramatic development of the opera meant a sea-change from the Metastasian primacy of the aria; in Rossini's works, solo arias progressively take up a smaller proportion of the operas, in favour of duets (also typically in cantabile-cabaletta format) and ensembles.

During the late 18th century, creators of opera buffa had increasingly developed dramatic integration of the finales of each act. Finales began to "spread backwards", taking an ever larger proportion of the act, taking the structure of a musically continuous chain, accompanied throughout by orchestra, of a series of sections, each with its own characteristics of speed and style, mounting to a clamorous and vigorous final scene. In his comic operas Rossini brought this technique to its peak and extended its range far beyond his predecessors. Of the finale to the first act of L'italiana in Algeri, Taruskin writes that "[r]unning through almost a hundred pages of vocal score in record time, it is the most concentrated single dose of Rossini that there is."

Of greater consequence for the history of opera was Rossini's ability to progress this technique in the genre of opera seria. Gossett in a very detailed analysis of the first-act finale of Tancredi identifies several elements in Rossini's practice. These include the contrast of "kinetic" action sequences, often characterised by orchestral motifs, with "static" expressions of emotion, the final "static" section in the form of a cabaletta, with all the characters joining in the final cadences. Gossett claims that it is "from the time of Tancredi that the cabaletta ... becomes the obligatory closing section of each musical unit in the operas of Rossini and his contemporaries."

=== Early works ===
With extremely few exceptions, all Rossini's compositions before the Péchés de vieillesse of his retirement involve the human voice. His very first surviving work (apart from a single song) is however a set of string sonatas for two violins, cello and double-bass, written at the age of 12 when he had barely begun instruction in composition. Tuneful and engaging, they indicate how remote the talented child was from the influence of the advances in musical form evolved by Mozart, Haydn and Beethoven; the accent is on cantabile melody, colour, variation and virtuosity rather than transformational development. These qualities are also evident in Rossini's early operas, especially his farse (one-act farces), rather than his more formal opere serie. Gossett notes that these early works were written at a time when "[t]he deposited mantles of Cimarosa and Paisiello were unfilled" – these were Rossini's first, and increasingly appreciated, steps in trying them on. The Teatro San Moisè in Venice, where his farse was first performed, and the La Scala Theatre of Milan which premiered his two-act opera La pietra del paragone (1812), were seeking works in that tradition; Gossett notes that in these operas "Rossini's musical personality began to take shape ... many elements emerge that remain throughout his career" including "[a] love of sheer sound, of sharp and effective rhythms". The unusual effect employed in the overture of Il signor Bruschino, (1813) deploying violin bows tapping rhythms on music stands, is an example of such witty originality. (Note: Although it did not always seem so attractive to its contemporary audiences or musicians: one review of the première of Bruschino commented "it is utterly incomprehensible how a maestro could write such a meaningless overture, one in which members of the orchestra beat their music stands; this was sinking so low that on the first night the musicians refused to cooperate.")

=== Italy, 1813–1823 ===
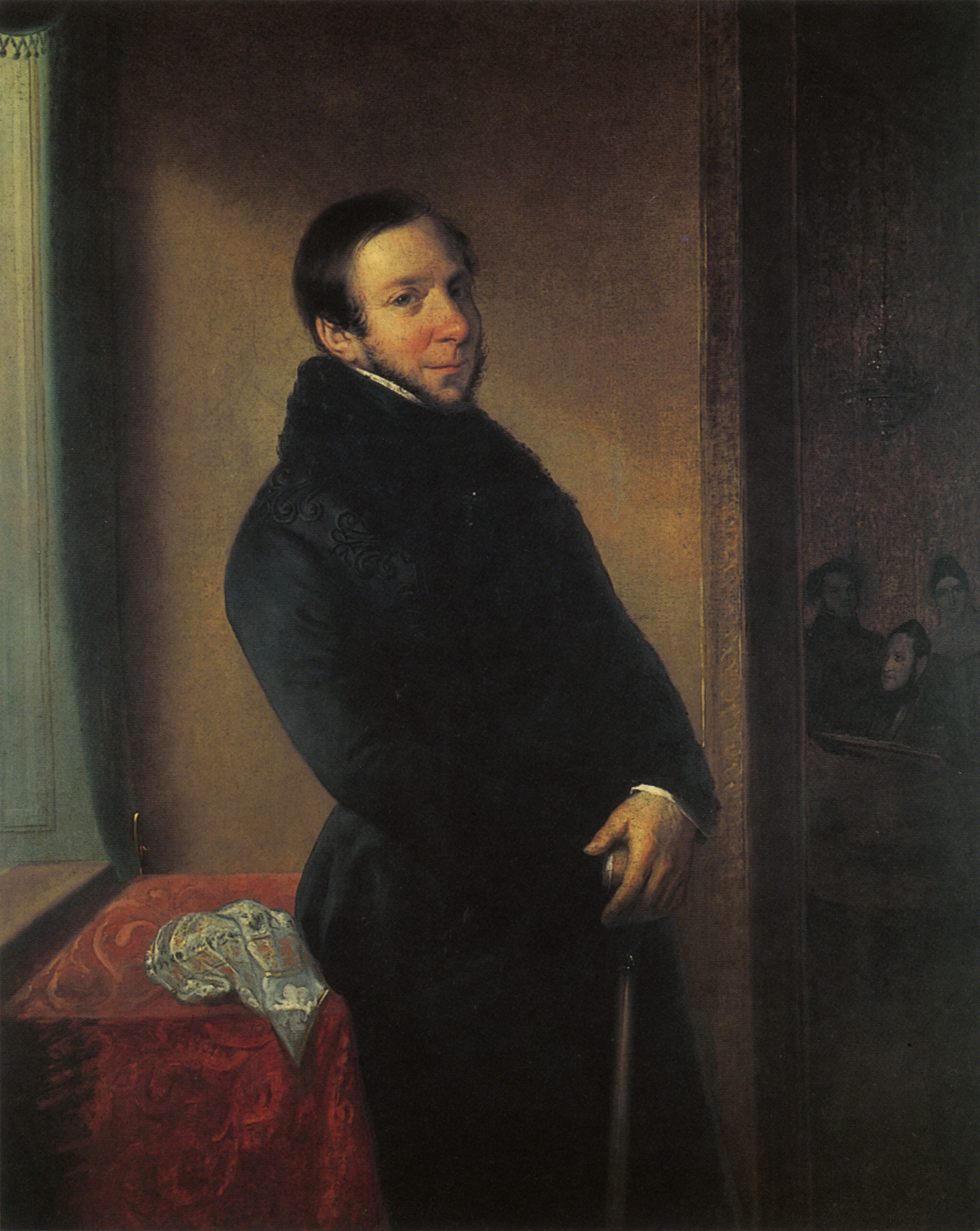
Domenico Barbaja in Naples in the 1820s

The great success in Venice of the premieres of both Tancredi and the comic opera L'italiana in Algeri within a few weeks of each other (6 February 1813 and 22 May 1813 respectively) set the seal on Rossini's reputation as the rising opera composer of his generation. From the end of 1813 to mid-1814 he was in Milan creating two new operas for La Scala, Aureliano in Palmira and Il Turco in Italia. Arsace in Aureliano was sung by the castrato Giambattista Velluti; this was the last opera role Rossini wrote for a castrato singer as the norm became to use contralto voices – another sign of change in operatic taste. Rumour had it that Rossini was displeased by Velluti's ornamentation of his music; but in fact throughout his Italian period, up to Semiramide (1823), Rossini's written vocal lines become increasingly florid, and this is more appropriately credited to the composer's own changing style. (Note: But there were limits. When Adelina Patti performed at one of Rossini's Saturday soirées, during his retirement, an over-the-top version of "Una voce poco fa" from The Barber, the composer gently enquired "Very nice, my dear, and who wrote the piece you have just performed?")

Rossini's work in Naples contributed to this stylistic development. The city, which was the cradle of the operas of Cimarosa and Paisiello, had been slow to acknowledge the composer from Pesaro, but Domenico Barbaia invited him in 1815 on a seven-year contract to manage his theatres and compose operas. For the first time, Rossini was able to work over a long period with a company of musicians and singers, including amongst the latter Isabella Colbran, Andrea Nozzari, Giovanni David and others, who as Gossett notes "all specialized in florid singing" and "whose vocal talents left an indelible and not wholly positive mark on Rossini's style". Rossini's first operas for Naples, Elisabetta, regina d'Inghilterra and La gazzetta were both largely recycled from earlier works, but Otello (1816) is marked not only by its virtuoso vocal lines but by its masterfully integrated last act, with its drama underlined by melody, orchestration and tonal colour; here, in Gossett's opinion "Rossini came of age as a dramatic artist." He further comments:

The growth of Rossini's style from Elisabetta, regina d'Inghilterra to Zelmira and, ultimately, Semiramide, is a direct consequence of th[e] continuity [he experienced in Naples]. Not only did Rossini compose some of his finest operas for Naples, but these operas profoundly affected operatic composition in Italy and made possible the developments that were to lead to Verdi.

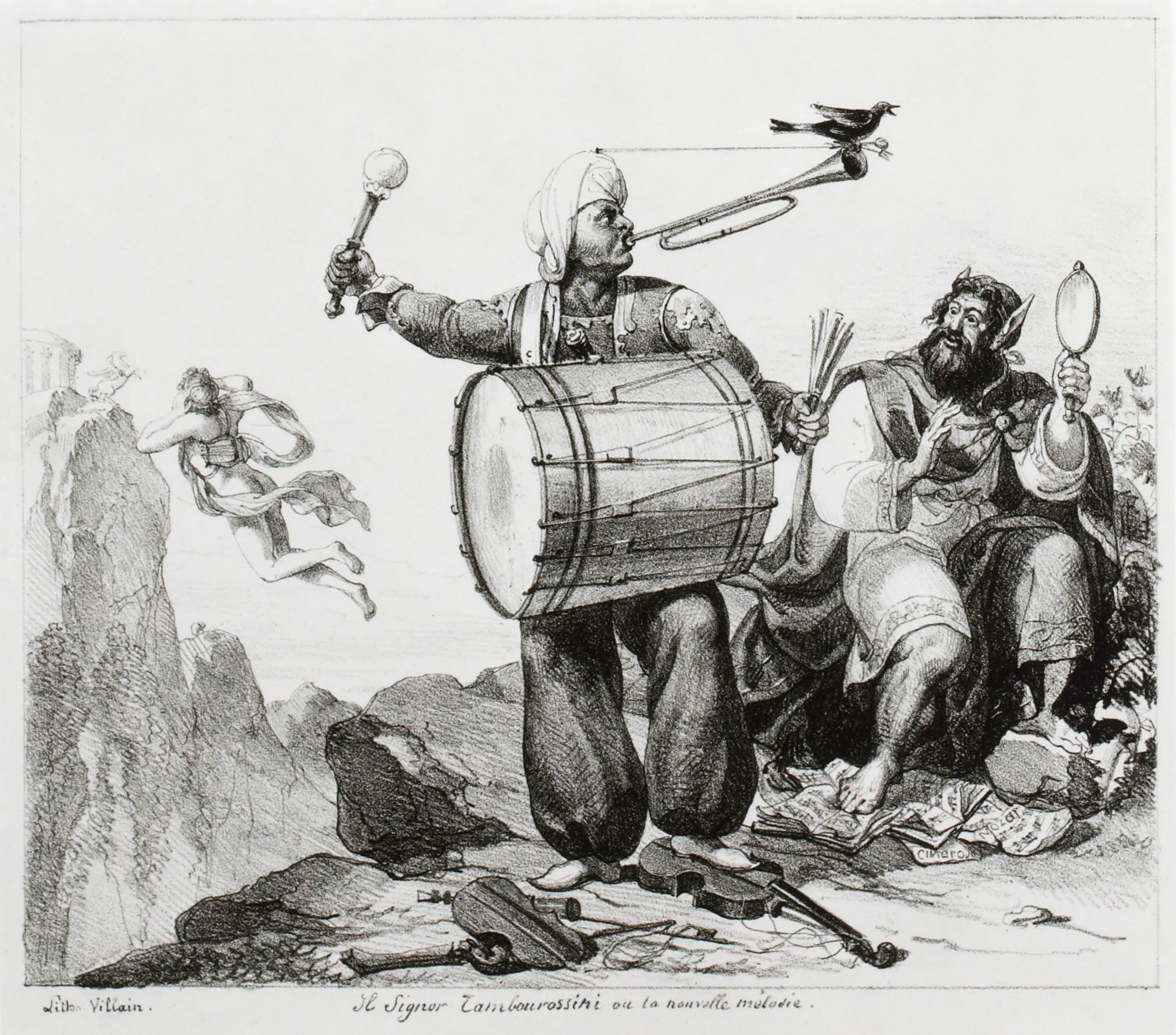
"Il signor Tambourossini, ou la nouvelle mélodie" (1821). Combining the composer's name with tambour (French for "drum"), this lithograph by the French artist Paul Delaroche makes clear the early Rossini's European reputation as a creator of noise, including a trumpet and drum accompanied by a magpie, several references to his early operas, (Note: The magpie is also a reference to La gazza ladra, the oriental dress references Otello or maybe Il turco in Italia) and showing him and King Midas literally trampling on sheet-music and violins, while Apollo (the god of music) makes his escape in the background.

By now, Rossini's career was arousing interest across Europe. Others came to Italy to study the revival of Italian opera and used its lessons to advance themselves; amongst these was the Berlin-born Giacomo Meyerbeer who arrived in Italy in 1816, a year after Rossini's establishment at Naples, and lived and worked there until following him to Paris in 1825; he used one of Rossini's librettists, Gaetano Rossi, for five of his seven Italian operas, which were produced at Turin, Venice and Milan. In a letter to his brother of September 1818, he includes a detailed critique of Otello from the point of view of a non-Italian informed observer. He is scathing about the self-borrowings in the first two acts, but concedes that the third act "so firmly established Rossini's reputation in Venice that even a thousand follies could not rob him of it. But this act is divinely beautiful, and what is so strange is that [its] beauties ... are blatantly un-Rossinian: outstanding, even passionate recitatives, mysterious accompaniments, lots of local colour."

Rossini's contract did not prevent him from undertaking other commissions, and before Otello, Il barbiere di Siviglia, a grand culmination of the opera buffa tradition, had been premiered in Rome (February 1816). Richard Osborne catalogues its excellencies:

Beyond the physical impact of ... Figaro's "Largo al factotum", there is Rossini's ear for vocal and instrumental timbres of a peculiar astringency and brilliance, his quick-witted word-setting, and his mastery of large musical forms with their often brilliant and explosive internal variations. Add to that what Verdi called the opera's "abundance of true musical ideas", and the reasons for the work's longer-term emergence as Rossini's most popular opera buffa are not hard to find.

Apart from La Cenerentola (Rome, 1817), and the "pen-and-ink sketch" farsa Adina (1818, not performed until 1826), Rossini's other works during his contract with Naples were all in the opera seria tradition. Amongst the most notable of these, all containing virtuoso singing roles, were Mosè in Egitto (1818), La donna del lago (1819), Maometto II (1820) all staged in Naples, and Semiramide, his last opera written for Italy, staged at La Fenice in Venice in 1823. The three versions of the opera semiseria Matilde di Shabran were written in 1821/1822. Both Mosè and Maometto II were later to undergo significant reconstruction in Paris (see below).

=== France, 1824–1829 ===
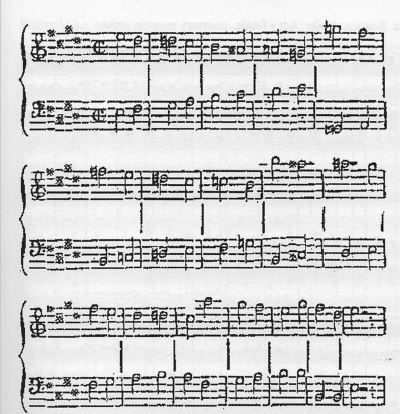
Extract from Rossini's Moïse published in Le Globe, 31 March 1827, in an article by Ludovic Vitet (Note: Apparently the first music quotation ever printed in a Paris daily newspaper, the extract outlines the choral music that excited audiences at the end of the opera's third act.)

Already in 1818, Meyerbeer had heard rumours that Rossini was seeking a lucrative appointment at the Paris Opera – "Should [his proposals] be accepted, he will go to the French capital, and we will perhaps experience curious things." Some six years were to pass before this prophecy came true.

In 1824 Rossini, under a contract with the French government, became director of the Théâtre-Italien in Paris, where he introduced Meyerbeer's opera Il crociato in Egitto, and for which he wrote Il viaggio a Reims to celebrate the coronation of Charles X (1825). This was his last opera to an Italian libretto, and half of its music was later reused to create his first French opera, Le comte Ory (1828). A new contract in 1826 meant he could concentrate on productions at the Opéra and to this end he substantially revised Maometto II as Le siège de Corinthe (1826) and Mosé as Moïse et Pharaon (1827). Meeting French taste, the works are extended (each by one act), the vocal lines in the revisions are less florid and the dramatic structure is enhanced, with the proportion of arias reduced. One of the most striking additions was the chorus at the end of Act III of Moïse, with a crescendo repetition of a diatonic ascending bass line, rising first by a minor third, then by a major third, at each appearance, and a descending chromatic top line, which roused the excitement of audiences.

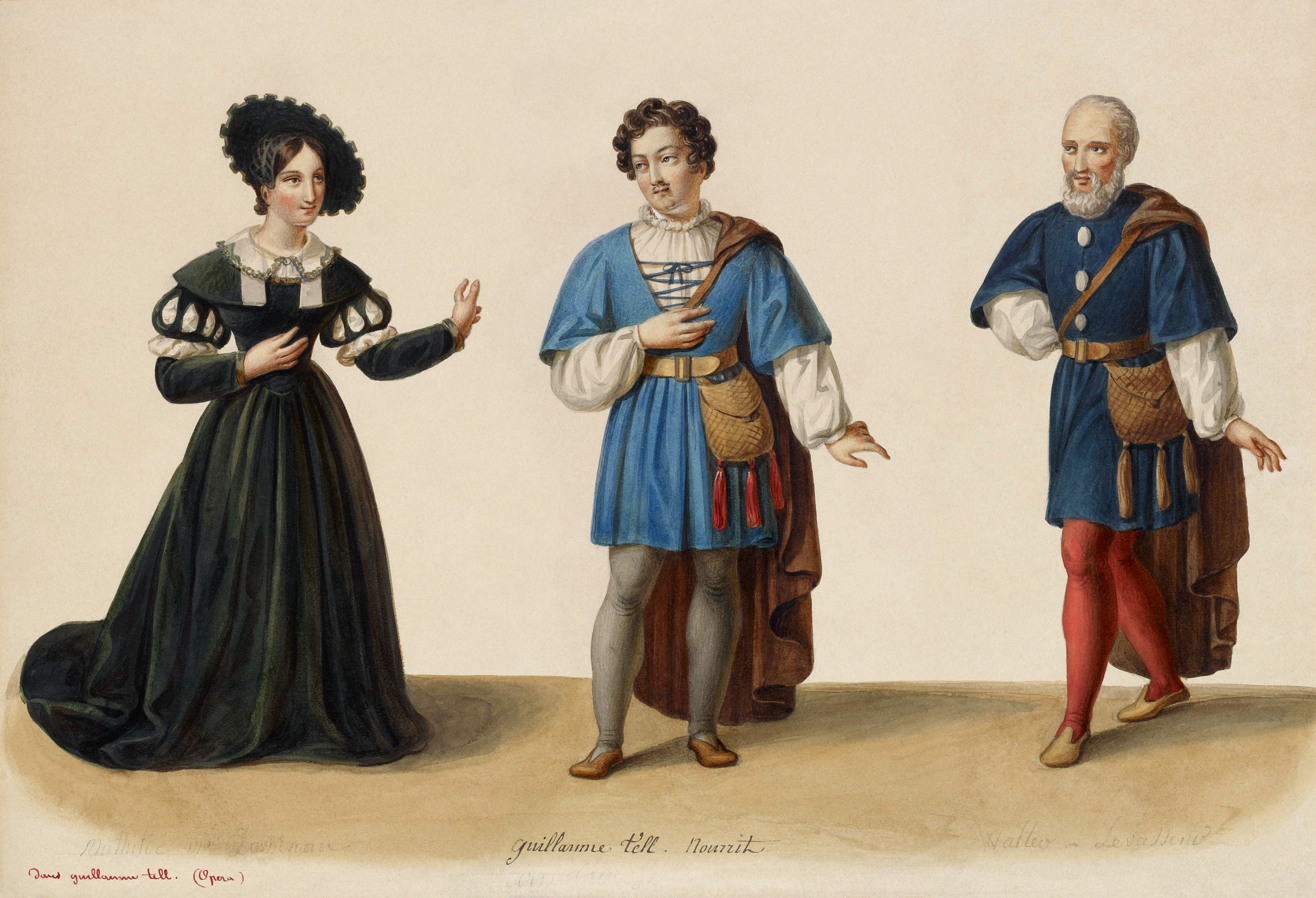
Costume designs for Guillaume Tell, with Laure Cinti-Damoreau as Mathilde, Adolphe Nourrit as Arnold Melchtal, and Nicolas Levasseur as Walter Furst

Rossini's government contract required him to create at least one new "grand opėra", and Rossini settled on the story of William Tell, working closely with the librettist Étienne de Jouy. The story in particular enabled him to indulge "an underlying interest in the related genres of folk music, pastoral and the picturesque". This becomes clear from the overture, which is explicitly programmatic in describing weather, scenery and action, and presents a version of the Ranz des Vaches, the Swiss cowherd's call, which "undergoes a number of transformations during the opera" and gives it in Richard Osborne's opinion "something of the character of a leitmotif". (Note: The ranz des vaches had already been used to characterise Switzerland in André Grétry's 1791 opera on Tell.) In the opinion of the music historian Benjamin Walton, Rossini "saturate[s] the work with local colour to such a degree that there is room for little else." Thus, the role of the soloists is significantly reduced compared to other Rossini operas, the hero not even having an aria of his own, whilst the chorus of the Swiss people is consistently in the musical and dramatic foregrounds.

Guillaume Tell premiered in August 1829. Rossini also provided for the Opéra a shorter, three-act version, which incorporated the pas redoublé (quick march) final section of the overture in its finale; it was first performed in 1831 and became the basis of the Opéra's future productions. Tell was very successful from the start and was frequently revived – in 1868 the composer was present at its 500th performance at the Opéra. The Globe had reported enthusiastically at its opening that "a new epoch has opened not only for French opera, but for dramatic music elsewhere". This was an era, it transpired, in which Rossini was not to participate.

=== Withdrawal, 1830–1868 ===
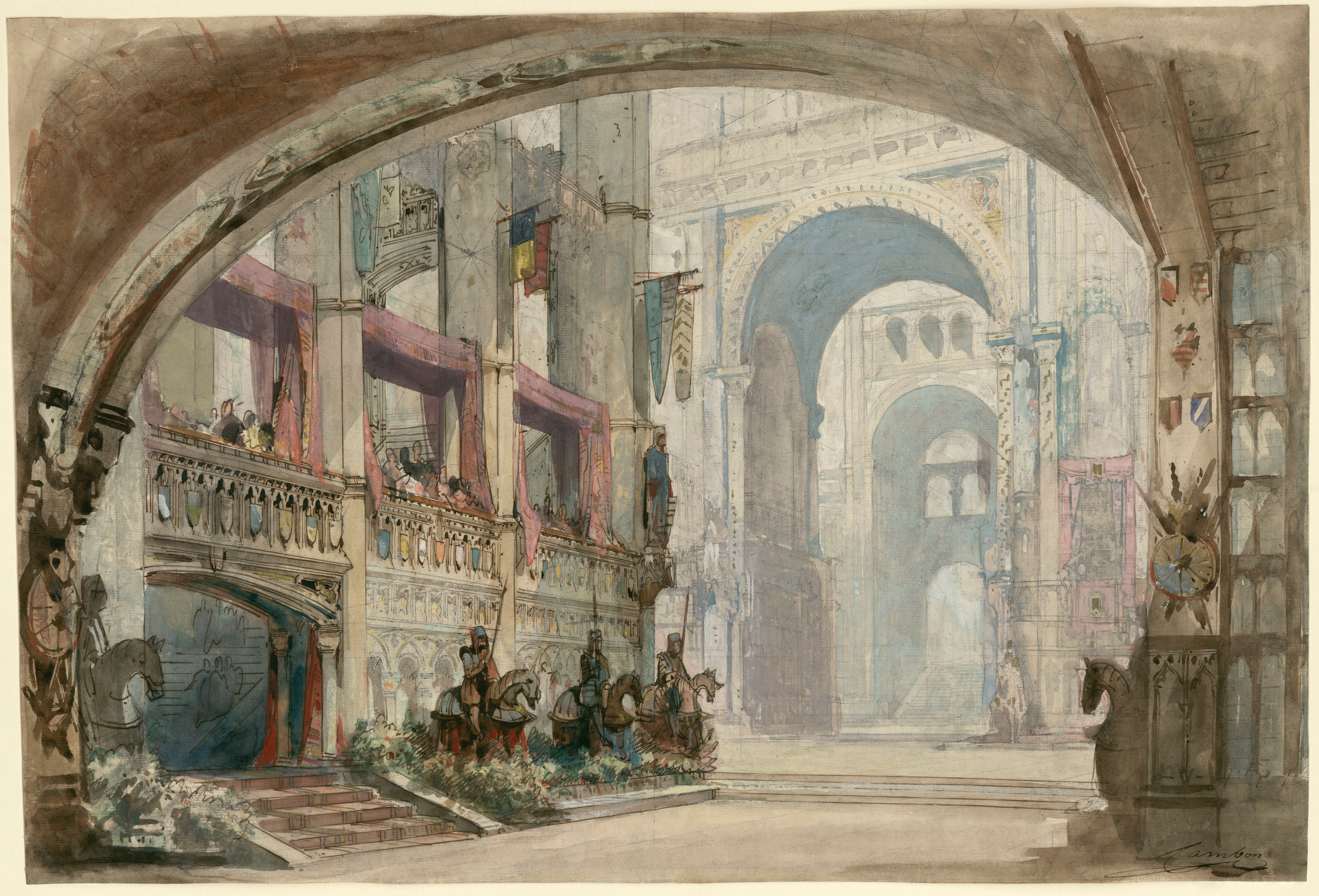
Set design for the original production of Robert Bruce (1846)

Rossini's contract required him to provide five new works for the Opéra over 10 years. After the première of Tell he was already considering some opera subjects, including Goethe's Faust, but the only significant works he completed before abandoning Paris in 1836 were the Stabat Mater, written for a private commission in 1831 (later completed and published in 1841), and the collection of salon vocal music Soirées musicales published in 1835. Living in Bologna, he occupied himself teaching singing at the Liceo Musicale, and also created a pasticcio of Tell, Rodolfo di Sterlinga, for the benefit of the singer Nicola Ivanoff, for which Giuseppe Verdi provided some new arias. Continuing demand in Paris resulted in the production of a "new" French version of Otello in 1844 (with which Rossini was not involved) and a "new" opera Robert Bruce for which Rossini cooperated with Louis Niedermeyer and others to recast music for La donna del lago and others of his works which were little-known in Paris to fit a new libretto. The success of both of these was qualified, to say the least.

Not until Rossini returned to Paris in 1855 were there signs of a revival of his musical spirits. A stream of pieces, for voices, choir, piano, and chamber ensembles, written for his soirées, the Péchés de vieillesse (Sins of old age) were issued in thirteen volumes from 1857 to 1868; of these, volumes 4 to 8 comprise "56 semi-comical piano pieces .... dedicated to pianists of the fourth class, to which I have the honour of belonging." These include a mock funeral march, Marche et reminiscences pour mon dernier voyage (March and reminiscences for my last journey). Gossett writes of the Péchés "Their historical position remains to be assessed but it seems likely that their effect, direct or indirect, on composers like Camille Saint-Saëns and Erik Satie was significant." (Note: The popular Cat's duet, frequently attributed to Rossini, is not by him but is a confection of the "Katte-Cavatine" by the Danish composer C.E.F. Weyse with music from Rossini's Otello.)

The most substantial work of Rossini's last decade, the Petite messe solennelle (1863), was written for small forces (originally voices, two pianos and harmonium), and therefore unsuited to concert hall performance; and as it included women's voices it was unacceptable for church performances at the time. For these reasons, Richard Osborne suggests, the piece has been somewhat overlooked among Rossini's compositions. It is neither especially petite (little) nor entirely solennelle (solemn), but is notable for its grace, counterpoint and melody. At the end of the manuscript, the composer wrote:

Dear God, here it is finished, this poor little Mass. Is it sacred music I have written, or damned music? I was born for opera buffa, as you know well. A little technique, a little heart, that's all. Be blessed then, and grant me Paradise.

== Influence and legacy ==
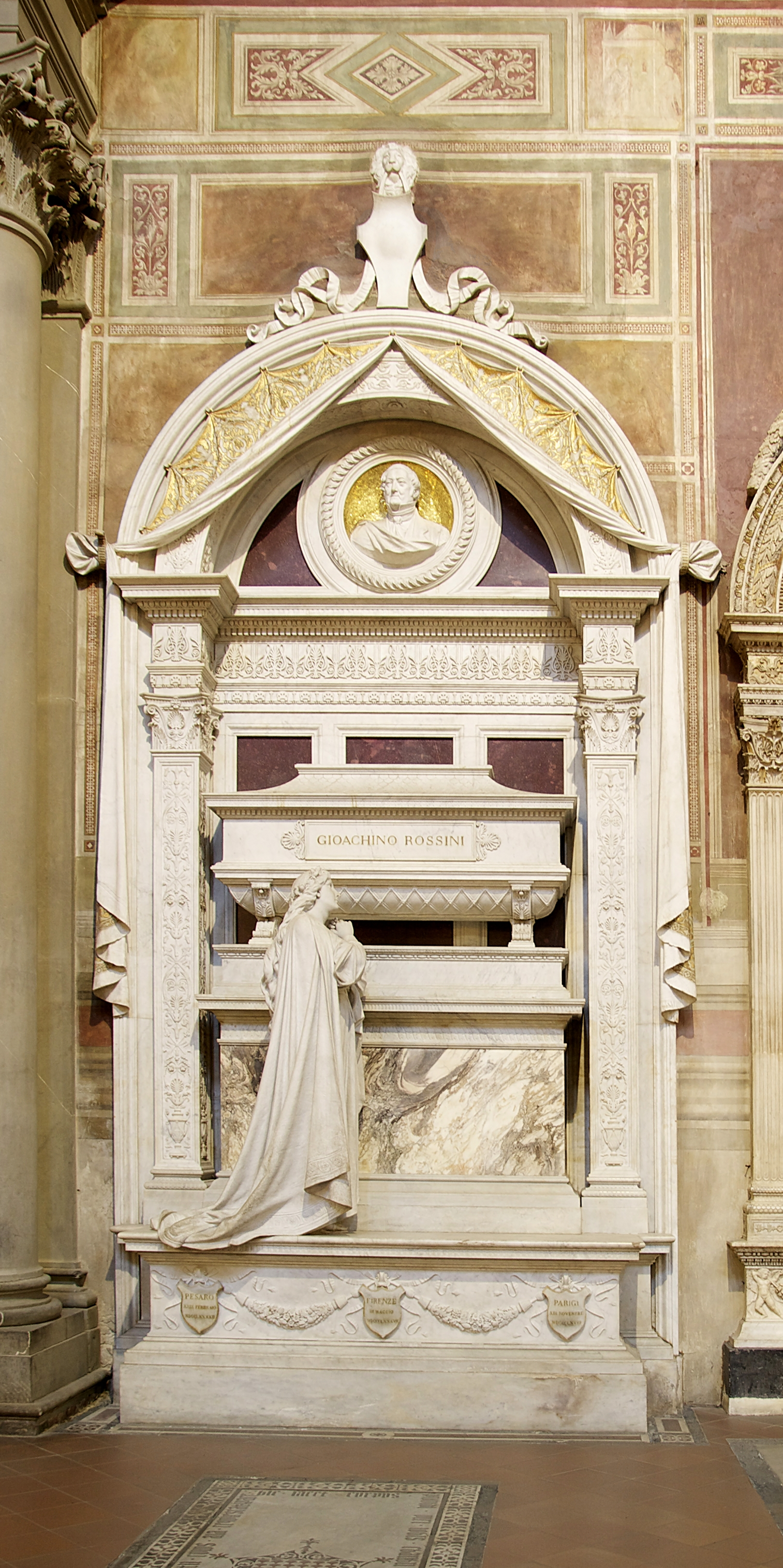
Rossini's final resting place, in the Basilica of Santa Croce, Florence; sculpture by Giuseppe Cassioli (1900)

The popularity of Rossini's melodies led many contemporary virtuosi to create piano transcriptions or fantasies based on them. Examples include Sigismond Thalberg's fantasy on themes from Moïse, the sets of variations on "Non più mesta" from La Cenerentola by Henri Herz, Frédéric Chopin, Franz Hünten, Anton Diabelli and Friedrich Burgmüller, Liszt's transcriptions of the William Tell overture (1838) and the Soirées musicales, (Note: Liszt wrote fantasies and variations (some now lost) based on many Rossini operas, including Ermione (1824), La donna del lago (1825), Le siège de Corinthe (1830, also for piano and orchestra), Otello (1834 and 1859), Maometto II (1839) and Moïse (1841)) and Marie de Pierpont’s arrangement of Othello for harmonium (1885).

The continuing popularity of his comic operas (and the decline in staging his opere serie), the overthrow of the singing and staging styles of his period, and the emerging concept of the composer as a "creative artist" rather than a craftsman, diminished and distorted Rossini's place in music history even though the forms of Italian opera continued up to the period of verismo to be indebted to his innovations. Rossini's status amongst his contemporary Italian composers is indicated by the Messa per Rossini, a project initiated by Verdi within a few days of Rossini's death, which he and a dozen other composers created in collaboration. (Note: The Mass was intended for a premiere in Bologna in 1869, but the performance was abandoned amid acrimonious intrigue. Verdi later reworked his own contribution, "Libera me", in his own Messa da Requiem of 1874. The manuscripts lay neglected until 1970, and the first performance of the Messa took place in 1988.)

If Rossini's principal legacy to Italian opera was in vocal forms and dramatic structure for serious opera, his legacy to French opera was to provide a bridge from opera buffa to the development of opéra comique (and thence, via Jacques Offenbach's opéras bouffes to the genre of operetta). Opéras comiques showing a debt to Rossini's style include François-Adrien Boieldieu's La dame blanche (1825) and Daniel Auber's Fra Diavolo (1830), as well as works by Ferdinand Hérold, Adolphe Adam and Fromental Halévy. Critical of Rossini's style was Hector Berlioz, who wrote of his "melodic cynicism, his contempt for dramatic and good sense, his endless repetition of a single form of cadence, his eternal puerile crescendo and his brutal bass drum".

It was perhaps inevitable that the formidable reputation which Rossini had built in his lifetime would fade thereafter. In 1886, less than twenty years after the composer's death, Bernard Shaw wrote: "The once universal Rossini, whose Semiramide appeared to our greener grandfathers a Ninevesque wonder, came at last to be no longer looked upon as a serious musician." In an 1877 review of Il barbiere, he noted that Adelina Patti sang as an encore in the lesson scene "Home, Sweet Home" (Note: Ballad composed by Henry Bishop, 1823.) but that "the opera proved so intolerably wearisome that some of her audience had already displayed their appreciation of the sentiment of the ballad in the most practical way."

In the early 20th century Rossini received tributes from both Ottorino Respighi, who had orchestrated excerpts from the Péchés de vieillesse both in his ballet la boutique fantasque (1918) and in his 1925 suite Rossiniana, and from Benjamin Britten, who adapted music by Rossini for two suites, Soirées musicales (Op. 9) in 1937 and Matinées musicales (Op. 24) in 1941. Richard Osborne singles out the three-volume biography of Rossini by Giuseppe Radiciotti (1927–1929) as an important turning point towards positive appreciation, which may also have been assisted by the trend of neoclassicism in music. A firm re-evaluation of Rossini's significance began only later in the 20th century in the light of study, and the creation of critical editions, of his works. A prime mover in these developments was the "Fondazione G. Rossini" which was created by the city of Pesaro in 1940 using the funds which had been left to the city by the composer. Since 1980 the "Fondazione" has supported the annual Rossini Opera Festival in Pesaro.

In the 21st century, the Rossini repertoire of opera houses around the world remains dominated by Il barbiere, La Cenerentola being the second most popular. Several other operas are regularly produced, including Le comte Ory, La donna del lago, La gazza ladra, Guillaume Tell, L'italiana in Algeri, La scala di seta, Il turco in Italia and Il viaggio a Reims. Other Rossini pieces in the current international repertory, given from time to time, include Adina, Armida, Elisabetta regina d'Inghilterra, Ermione, Mosé in Egitto and Tancredi. The Rossini in Wildbad festival specialises in producing the rarer works. (Note: In 2018 the company's recent and planned productions included Eduardo e Cristina, Giovanna d'Arco, L'equivoco stravagante, Maometto II, Zelmira and Moïse et Pharaon.) The Operabase performance-listing website records 2,319 performances of 532 productions of Rossini operas in 255 venues across the world in the three years 2017–2019. All of Rossini's operas have been recorded. (Note: For recordings as at 2005, see the survey by Richard Farr.)

In 2025, an opera buffa titled Casa Rossini was composed by Paolo Fradiani, featuring Gioachino Rossini in the role of himself. The opera was performed the same year at the Foyer of the Teatro Ventidio Basso in Ascoli Piceno.
