= Edmond Michotte collection =

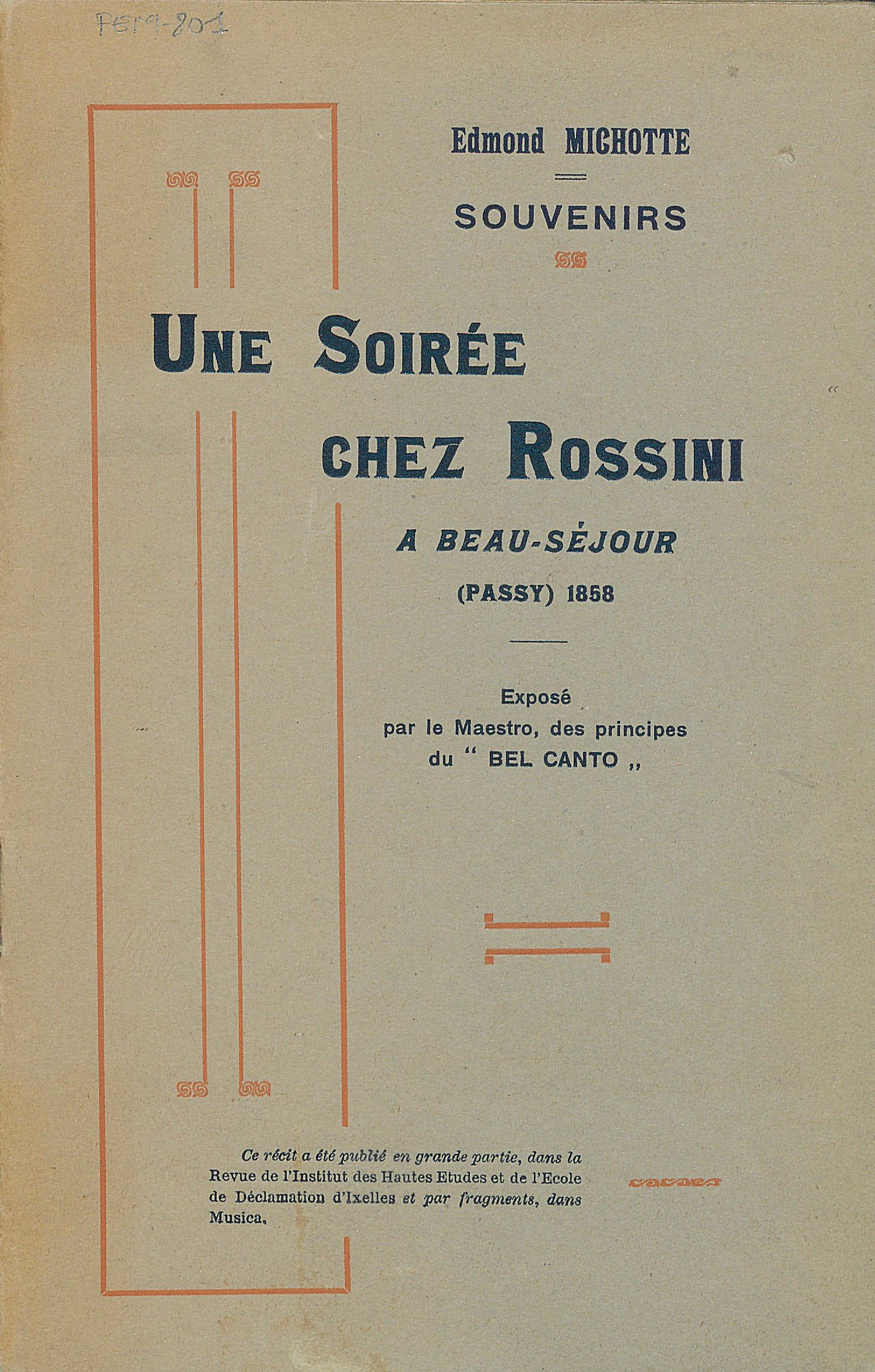
E. Michotte, Une soirée chez Rossini à Beau-Séjour (Passy), 1858 (Library of the Royal Conservatory of Brussels, B-Bc, FEM-801)

The Edmond Michotte collection is a donation to the Royal Conservatory of Brussels phased between 1897 and 1913, by the Belgian homonymous composer and musicographer, of an important part of the private library of Rossini with whom he became friendly.

== Biography ==
Born into a wealthy Belgian noble family, Edmond Michotte (1831–1914) was educated in Belgium and Paris. Back in his home country after the 1848 revolution, he chose to start music studies after an aborted bachelorship in Philosophy at the Free University of Brussels. A pianist and composer, he gained a wide reputation as a performer on the mattauphone virtuoso. From 1854 he lived between Brussels and Paris, where he moved in the celebrity circles of the musical crowd and became acquainted with Rossini – then almost forty years his senior – who considered him as his quasi figlio. After having had the opportunity to attend the meeting of the composer with Richard Wagner, he published a short review of the event. Back in Belgium in 1870, he became a member of several associations and presided over the vigilance committee of the Royal Conservatory of Brussels to which he donated his vast Rossinian collection in subsequent phases. He died in 1914 after a missile hit his house in Leuven, without having achieved his ambition to dedicate a museum to his illustrious friend and protector.

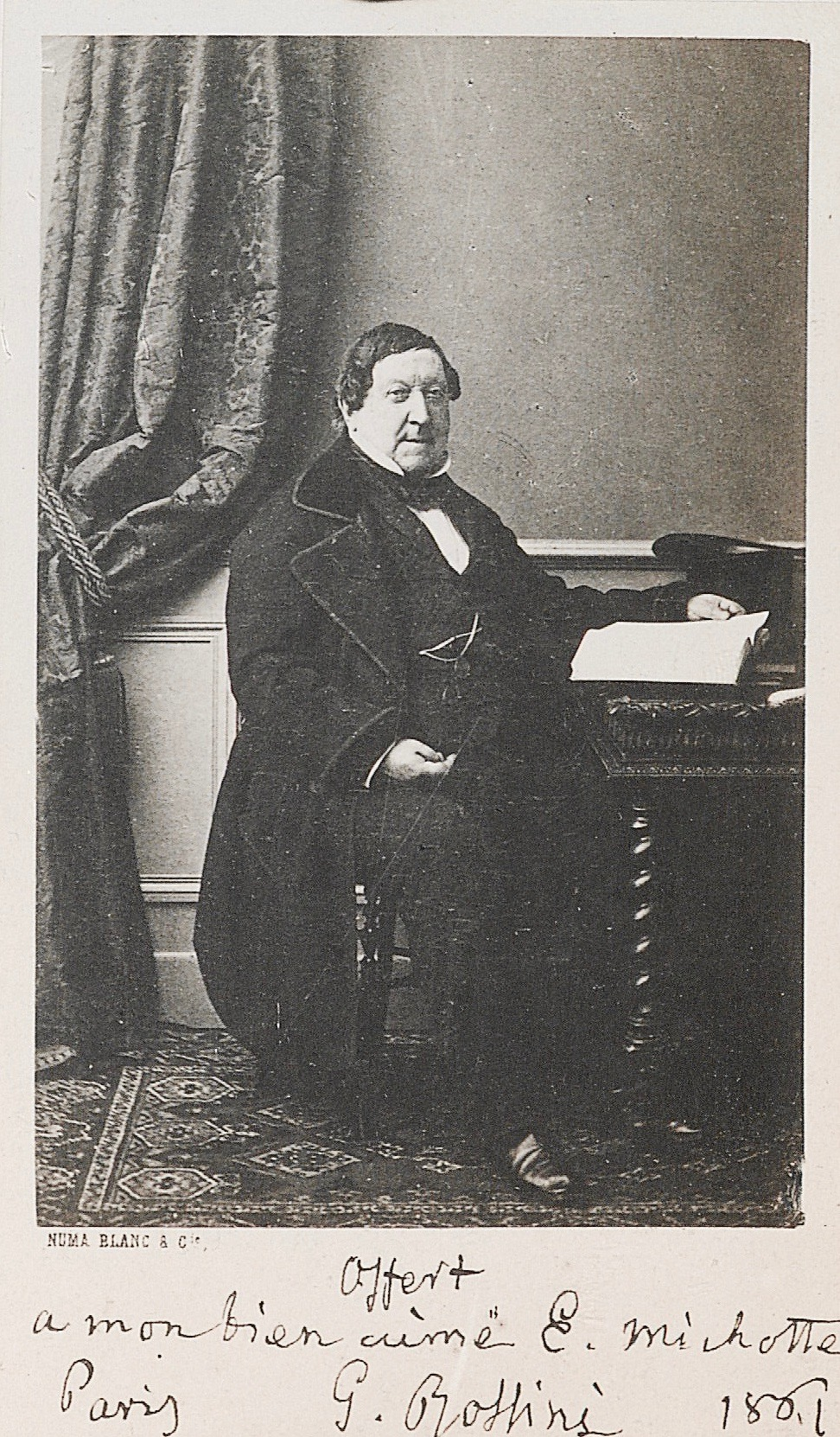
Photo of Rossini from Nadar, dedicated to Edmond Michotte (Library of the Royal Conservatory of Brussels, B-Bc, FEM-932)

== The collection ==
Appreciated by Rossinian scholars for the rarity of certain documents, the Michotte collection essentially contains pieces from Rossini's library: handwritten and printed scores, books, libretti and various publications, correspondence, iconographic material and various objects.

=== Autographs and printed scores ===
The collection contains close to 300 musical manuscripts, amongst which 26 are autograph; the majority of these are works by Rossini, including 180 compositions pertaining to the lyrical repertoire – mostly unedited airs, fragments or variations – written for the soprano Isabella Colbran (1785–1845), his first wife and creator of major roles, as well as vocal and instrumental music.

The collection includes the handwritten score of Matilde di Shabran (1821) – a minor work of the composer, but the only one in Belgium which sheds light on the evolution of Rossini's bel canto.

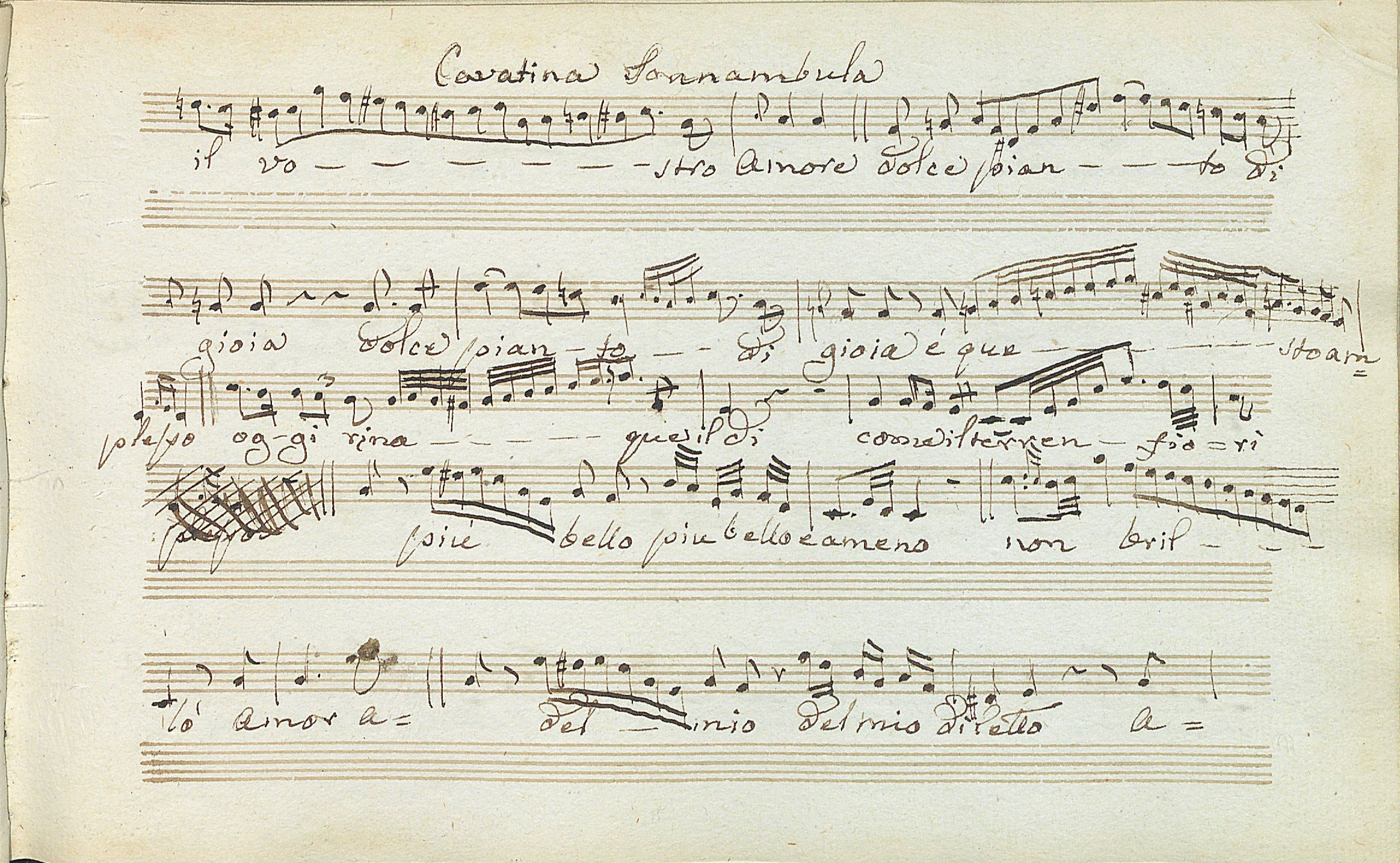
Cavatine of La Sonnambula (s.d.) (Library of the Royal Conservatory of Brussels, B-Bc, FEM-881)

Among some forty manuscripts from other composers is the autograph version of Six Polonaises D824, op. 61 from Schubert although no information is available as to how it became part of Rossini's library.

=== Books, libretti and various publications ===
The Michotte collection also comprises 420 titles of musical editions, of which approximately 120 are by Rossini, and 300 Italian or French publications from the XIX^{e} century, as well as a complete edition of the works of J.S. Bach and of Beethoven's symphonies. It is complemented by a precious collection of libretti of the first performances of Rossini, carefully assembled and bound by his father.

Other publications, many of which contain a dedication to Rossini, are of a different nature, but undoubtedly belonged to the shelves of the musician, such as the 1818 edition of Dante's Divina Commedia and the Répertoire général du théâtre français.

Monographs and press articles concerning Rossini, several printed programmes of the Soirées musicales – private concerts organised in Paris by the composer and his second wife Olympe Pélissier – give witness to the esthetic taste of the time.

=== Correspondence ===
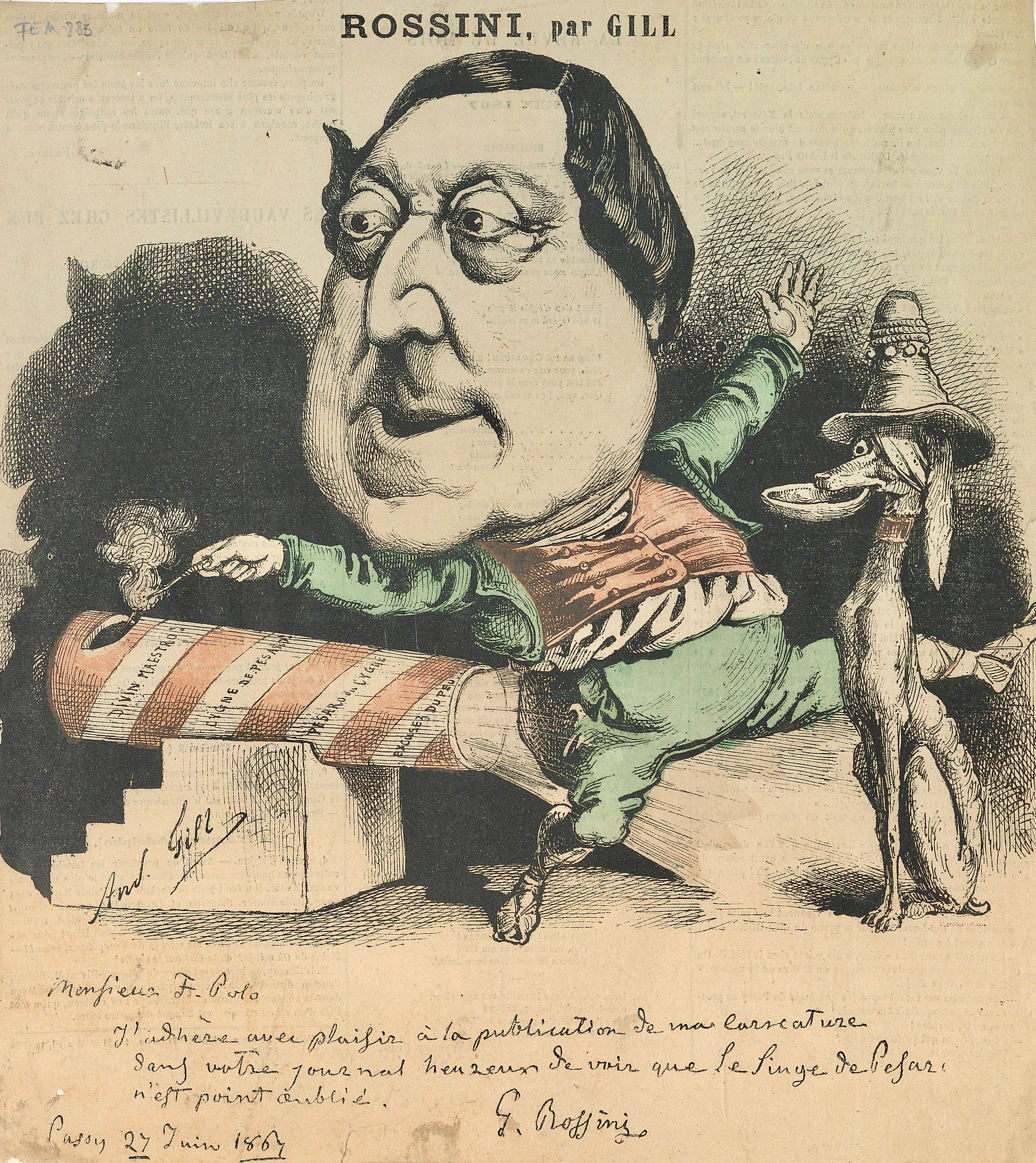
Caricature of Rossini by A. Gill, 1864 (Library of the Royal Conservatory of Brussels, B-Bc, FEM-883)

The collection includes more than two hundred letters and different handwritten texts – invitations, programs, poetry, furniture inventories, condolences, or the impressive list of celebrities attending the composer's funeral. The correspondence, of which half is autograph, holds some thirty letters from Rossini to his Bolognese secretary, Angelo Mignani, the others being addressed to the composer himself.

=== Iconographic material and various objects ===
The iconographic part of the collection, representing some hundred fifty images, covers lithographs of the young Rossini, photos – some by Nadar – of the old artist, his funeral and his exhumation, or of portraits of his parents, as well as some engravings featuring Colbran.

The personal objects in this section include a fan-formed vase with seven musical quotations from Rossini, representing the allegory of the « swan of Pesaro», next to a miniature biscuit bust, a paper cutter, a pince-nez and a tie-pin offered by Bellini.

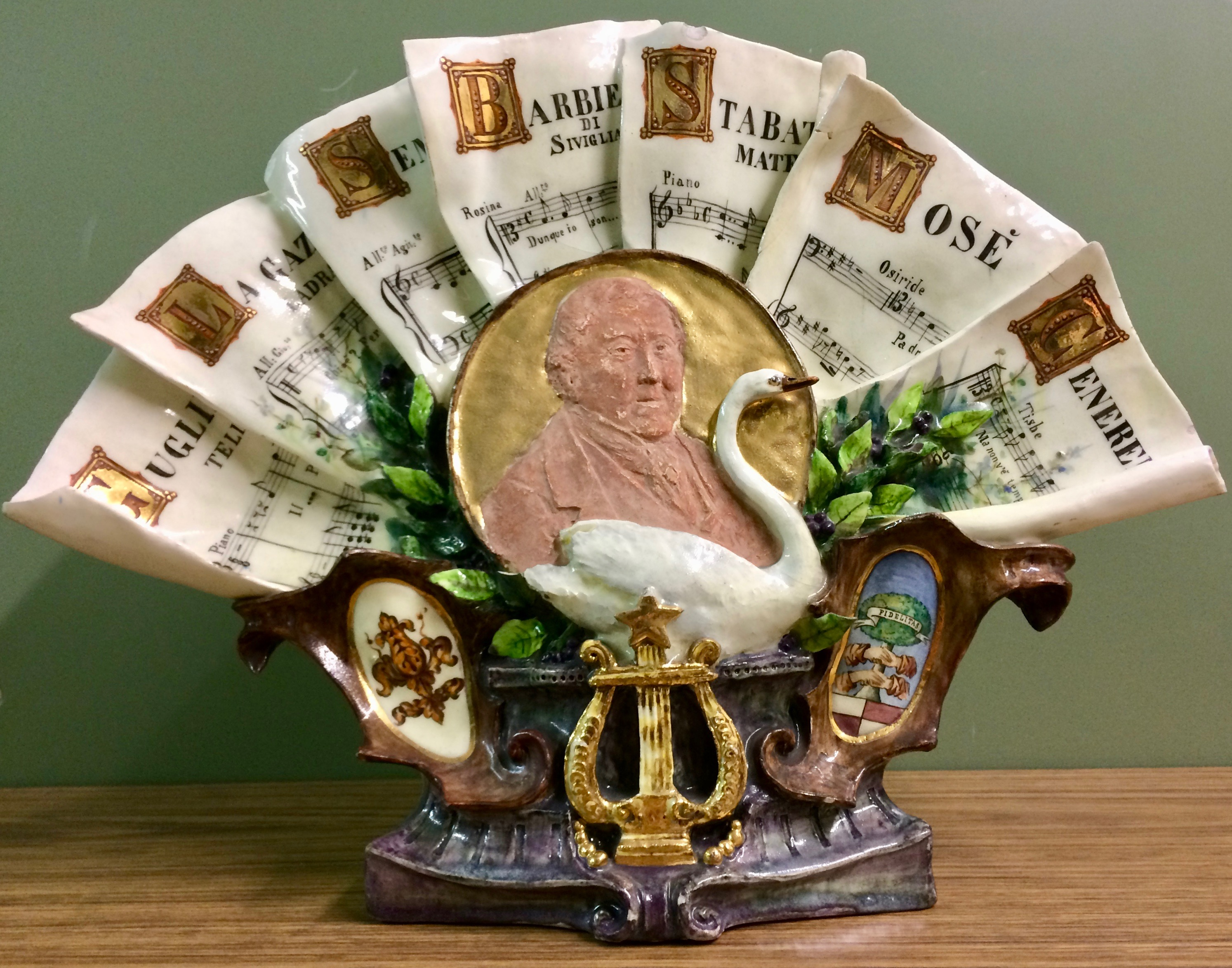
Allegorical vase representing Rossini as the "swan of Pesaro" backed by seven musical quotations (Library of the Royal Conservatory of Brussels, E. Michotte collection)

== Bibliography ==
- Alfred Wotquenne, « Liste des dons faits à la bibliothèque du Conservatoire royal de Bruxelles 1896-1898 », Annuaire du Conservatoire royal de Bruxelles 1897-1998, p. 105.
- Victor Mahillon, « Liste des dons faits au Musée du Conservatoire 1901 », Annuaire du Conservatoire royal de Bruxelles 1902, 26, 1902, pp. 156–157.
- Alfred Wotquenne, Catalogue de la bibliothèque du Conservatoire royal de Bruxelles, voll. 4, Bruxelles, 1912.
- Edouard Grégoir, « Michotte, Edmond », Les artistes-musiciens belges au XVIIIe et XIXe siècle, 3 voll., Bruxelles, 1885–1887, vol. I, pp. 314–315, 485.
- Thierry Levaux, Dictionnaire des compositeurs de Belgique du Moyen-Age à nos jours, Ohain-Lasne, Editions Art in Belgium, 2006.
- Johan Eeckeloo, « Il Musée Rossini », Bollettino del Centro Rossiniano di Studi, Rossini e Michotte, 2004, pp. 7–52.
- Olivia Wahnon de Oliviera, « La collection Rossini de la bibliothèque du Conservatoire royal de Bruxelles augmentée de deux documents autographes », Revue Belge de Musicologie, n^{o} 67, 2013, pp. 283–290.
- Philip Gossett, « Rossini Autographs in the Fonds Edmond Michotte of the Brussels Conservatory », Revue Belge de Musicologie, n^{o} 68, 2014, pp. 19–42.
- Edmond Michotte, Une soirée chez Rossini à Beau-Séjour (Passy) 1858, Bruxelles, 1893.
- Edmond Michotte, La visite de R. Wagner à Rossini, Paris 1860, Bruxelles, 1906.
