= Rossiniana =

Orchestral suite by Ottorino Respighi

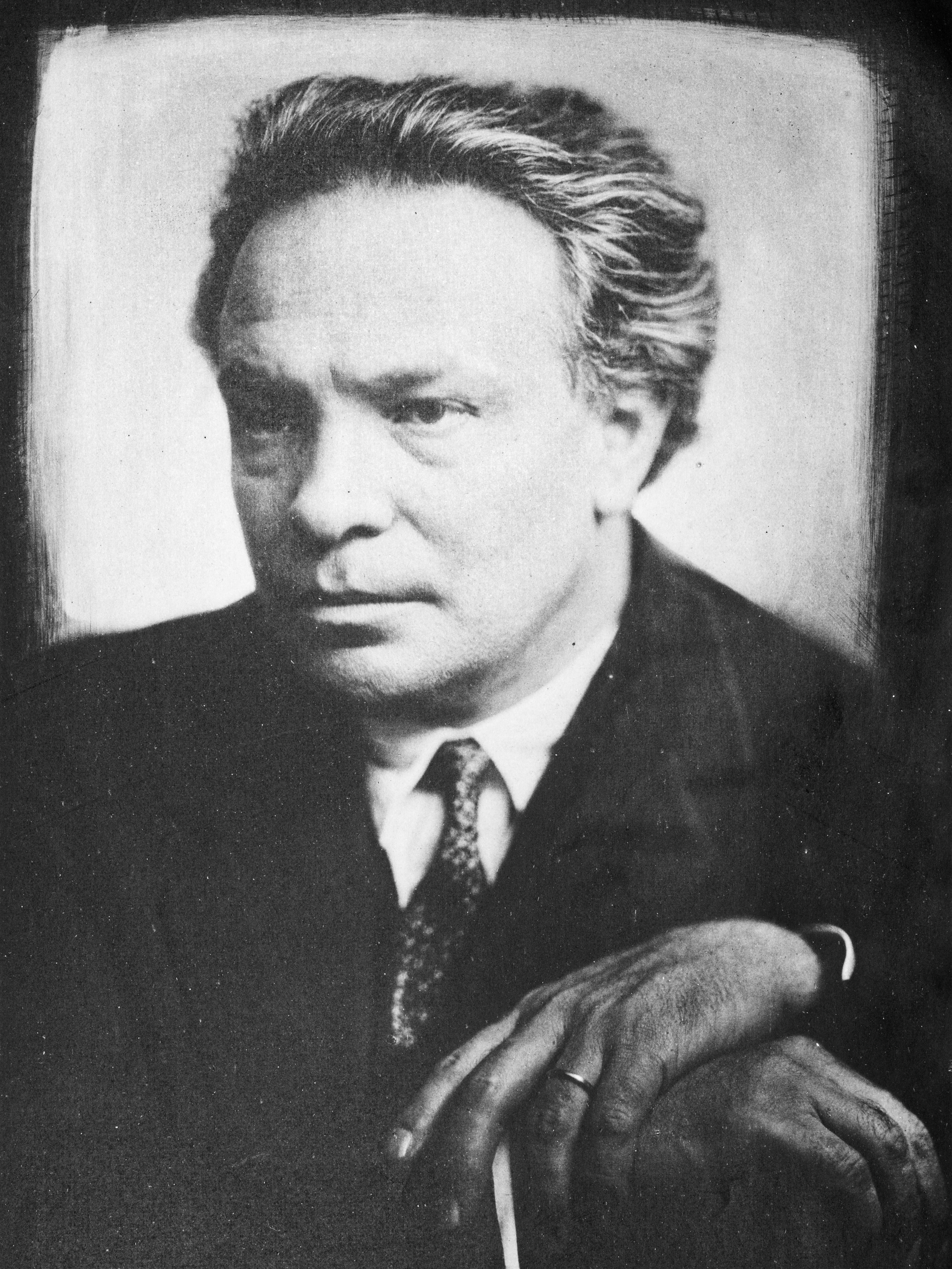
Ottorino Respighi in 1927

Rossiniana, P. 148, is a 1925 orchestral suite by Ottorino Respighi, based on four piano pieces by Gioachino Rossini.

Respighi had written the ballet La Boutique fantasque for Léonide Massine in 1919, basing it on short piano pieces from Rossini's collection Péchés de vieillesse (Sins of Old Age). In 1925, he returned to Rossini's music, but not as a ballet, simply as concert music. He again used Sins of Old Age, specifically Quelques riens (Various nothings) from Volume XII, and applied what he called a trascrizione libera (free transcription) to them.

The four movements are:

1. Capri e Taormina (Barcarola e Siciliana)
2. Lamento
3. Intermezzo
4. Tarantella 'puro sangue' (con passaggio de la Processione).

The scoring is brilliant, but also dark and evocative. Although not written for ballet, Rossiniana is eminently suitable for use in ballet. It has been choreographed.
