= Six string sonatas (Rossini) =

Sei sonate a quattro
- by Gioachino Rossini
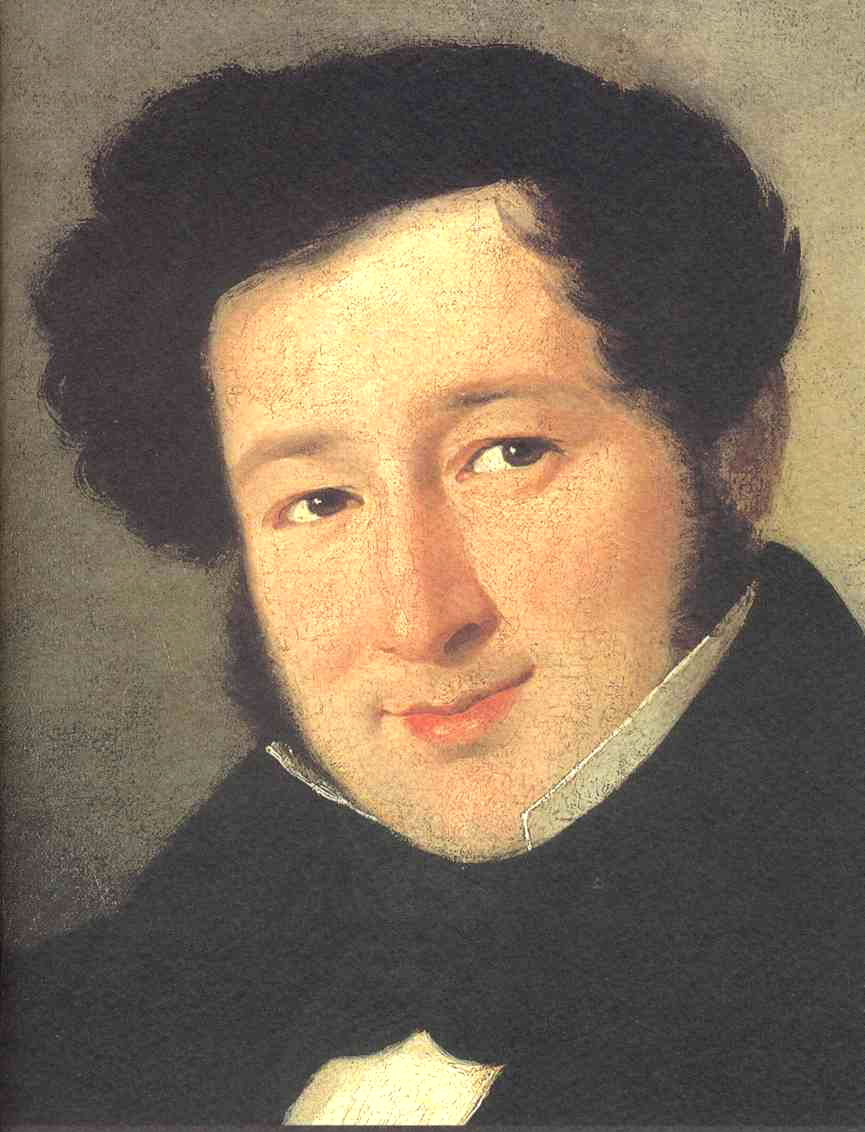
- Composed: 1804; 222 years ago
- Dedication: Agostino Triossi
- Performed: Casa Triossi, Ravenna
- Published: 1826, Casa Ricordi, Milan
- Scoring: 2 violins 1 cello 1 double bass

Six string sonatas were written by Italian composer Gioachino Rossini in 1804 but were not published until 1826. The sonatas are among Rossini's earliest recognized works, as he composed them while only 12 years old.

== History ==
Rossini composed his six string sonatas while staying in Ravenna during the summer of 1804. He was 12 years old at the time and was living in the home of the amateur double bass enthusiast Agostini Triossi. Triossi's influence was likely the reason why the double bass is featured prominently in the sonatas. According to Rossini himself, the sonatas were:

... composed and copied by me in three days and performed in a doggish way by Triossi, the Morini brothers, and the second violin by myself who was, to tell the truth, the least doggish.

With the exception of a single song, the six string sonatas are considered Rossini's earliest compositions. Though the music presents weaknesses and deficiencies, the sonatas are still considered remarkable works for a composer of such young age and inexperience.

In 1826, five of the six string sonatas (excluding Sonata No. 3) were first published by Casa Ricordi in Milan as standard string quartets. A further transposition for wind instruments is dated 1828/1829. However, the whereabouts of the sonatas eventually became a mystery, and scholars assumed that were destroyed. In 1942, the sonatas published by Ricordi were rediscovered, and in 1954, Rossini's original score was found in the Library of Congress in Washington, D.C.

== Sonatas ==
Rossini's six string sonatas are scored for four string instruments: two violins, a cello, and a double bass. Thus, the sonatas are sometimes referred to as sonate a quattro ("sonatas for four"). Each sonata is in three movements, with performances ranging from 11 to 16 minutes long. The sonatas are in major keys, and their movements all follow a typical "fast–slow–fast" tempo pattern. For three of the sonatas, however, the second Andante movement is in a minor key.

The sonatas exhibit multiple departures from musical expectations: the material is not formally developed in ways characteristic of other classical works, and the typical role of the cello is magnified with the introduction of a double bass.

=== String Sonata No. 1 ===
The first sonata is in G major:

1. Moderato
2. Andante
3. Allegro

=== String Sonata No. 2 ===
The second sonata is in A major:

1. Allegro
2. Andante
3. Allegro

=== String Sonata No. 3 ===
The third sonata is in C major:

1. Allegro
2. Andante
3. Moderato

=== String Sonata No. 4 ===
The fourth sonata is in B♭ major:

1. Allegro vivace
2. Andante
3. Allegretto

=== String Sonata No. 5 ===
The fifth sonata is in E♭ major:

1. Allegro vivace
2. Andante
3. Allegretto

=== String Sonata No. 6 ===
The sixth sonata is in D major:

1. Allegro spiritoso
2. Andante assai
3. Allegro Tempesta
