= List of tarantellas =

The tarantella is a traditional dance form, and accompanying music, with a distinctive rhythm, from the south of Italy. Tarantellas appear in many pieces of classical music, in literature, and in popular culture.

== Classical music ==
- Mily Balakirev has a "Tarantella in B major".
- Agustín Barrios wrote a "Tarantella for guitar (Recuerdos de Nápoles)".
- Ludwig van Beethoven's "Kreutzer" Violin Sonata, third movement, is a tarantella.
- Ludwig van Beethoven's Piano Sonata No. 18, fourth movement, is a tarantella.
- Benjamin Britten wrote a tarantella as the third and final movement of his Sinfonietta, Op. 1.
- Mario Castelnuovo-Tedesco wrote a tarantella for solo guitar, Op. 87b.
- Frédéric Chopin wrote a Tarantelle in A-flat, Op. 43 with the characteristic 6/8 time signature. It was inspired specifically by Rossini's's song "La Danza".
- Giuseppe Martucci wrote two tarantelle: Op. 9 (1873), and Op. 44, No. 6 (1880, orchestrated in 1908 titled "Danza").
- John Corigliano wrote a tarantella as the fourth movement of his Gazebo Dances, which he later used as the basis of the second movement of his Symphony No. 1.
- Claude Debussy wrote a piece called "Danse (Tarantelle styrienne)."
- Leopold Godowsky transcribed Chopin's Étude Op. 10, No. 5 "Black Key" into a tarantella for the piano.
- Grande Tarantelle, Op. 67 for piano and orchestra, written c.1866 by Louis Moreau Gottschalk.
- Oleg Karavaychuk wrote a tarantella.
- Helmut Lachenmann's twelfth movement of Tanzsuite mit Deutschlandlied (1979–80) is a tarantelle.
- Franz Liszt composed a piece called "Tarantella, Venezia e Napoli" (No. 3 from Années de pèlerinage, 2nd Year: Italy), which is in a rapid tempo in 6/8–2/4 time. Liszt also made solo piano transcriptions and expansive reworkings of tarantellas by several composers including Gioacchino Rossini, Daniel Auber, Alexander Dargomizhsky and César Cui.
- Felix Mendelssohn wrote a piece called "Tarantella" in 1845 (Op. 102, No. 3).
- Felix Mendelssohn's Italian Symphony, fourth movement, is a tarantella.
- Santiago de Murcia, a baroque Spanish composer and guitarist, wrote "Tarantelas" for guitar. It is No. 13 of his collection Saldivar Codex IV
- Albert Pieczonka, a pianist and composer who performed in Prussia, England, and the United States wrote a popular piano composition titled "Tarantella in A minor".
- David Popper wrote a piece called "Tarantella, Op. 33", written in 6/8 time.
- The fourth of Sergei Prokofiev's twelve easy pieces for piano—Musique d'Enfants, Op. 65—is a tarantella.
- Sergei Rachmaninoff's Suite No. 2 for Two Pianos, Op. 17, features a tarantella for its finale.
- Gioachino Rossini's song "La Danza" is a Neapolitan tarantella.
- Camille Saint-Saëns composed "Tarantella, Op. 6 in A minor for flute, clarinet and orchestra, or for flute, clarinet and piano". He also transcribed this piece for two pianos.
- Gaspar Sanz, a baroque Spanish composer, notated the chords of a Tarantelas in his book of instructions for the Spanish (baroque) guitar.
- Pablo de Sarasate composed an Introduction and Tarantella for violin.
- Franz Schubert's Death and the Maiden Quartet uses a tarantella in the frenetic fourth movement.
- Franz Schubert's Piano Sonata in C minor, last movement, is a tarantella/rondo.
- The fourth movement of Schubert's Symphony No. 3 is also a tarantella, but following the sonata form.
- John Serry Sr. composed his Tarantella for solo stradella accordion in 1942 and revised it in 1955.
- Allan Small wrote "Tarantella in A minor for piano".
- William Henry Squire wrote "Tarantella for cello in D minor".
- The fifteenth section of Igor Stravinsky's Pulcinella is a tarantella. This music is also the fourth movement of the composer's Pulcinella Suite and fifth of his Suite italienne.
- Karol Szymanowski wrote a Nocturne and Tarantella for violin and piano.
- Pyotr Ilyich Tchaikovsky's Capriccio Italien ends in a frenzied variation of a tarantella. Also, one of his Pas de Deux in The Nutcracker features a tarantella.
- Ferdinand Thieriot included a tarantella in his Symphonietta op. 55 E major (1873/1892), conducted by Arthur Nikisch and the Boston Symphony Orchestra in February 1893.
- Mark-Anthony Turnage composed a violin concerto entitled Mambo, Blues and Tarantella in 2007.
- Fred Werner 1909 Tarantelle
  Tarantelle 1909 by Fred Werner
- Henryk Wieniawski composed a well-known violin piece called Scherzo Tarantelle, Op. 16.
- Tarantella for Piano and Orchestra was composed by American composer Michael Glenn Williams for pianist Sean Chen.
- The last movement of Malcolm Williamson's Sinfonietta (1965) is a tarantella.

== Film ==
- The Fairy Godmother's song "Bibbidi-Bobbidi-Boo" from Disney's Cinderella (1950) is a tarantella in rhythm and tempo.
- The popular wedding tarantella C'è la luna mezzo mare has appeared in feature films such as The Godfather (1972).
- In The Godfather Part II (1974), Frankie Pentangeli tries to get the band playing at Michael's son's First Communion party (whose members are not Italian) to play a tarantella; following some quick coaching, the band instead ends up playing "Pop Goes the Weasel".
- It appears in The Legend of 1900 (1998) when Italian immigrants request 1900 to play tarantella music.
- The tarantella dance is referenced in the film Harry Potter and the Chamber of Secrets (2002), where it is the result of a magical curse.
- Rabbia e Tarantella is in the soundtrack of Inglourious Basterds (2009) by Quentin Tarantino.
- Extensive use of tarantellas is made in the French film Tous les soleils (2011).

== Television ==
- The Backyardigans episode "The Legend of the Volcano Sisters" features Tarantella as the music style du jour.

== Stage ==
- It has appeared in the musical version of Peter Pan (1954 on stage) with Mary Martin, and is danced by Captain Hook and his band of pirates, illustrating the above-mentioned occasional association with sword fights vis à vis the metaphor of pirates. In this performance, which is available on film, television, and DVD, the context is silly fun.
- In the song "How I Saved Roosevelt" from Assassins, a tarantella is used to musically represent Giuseppe Zangara.

== Video games ==
- A tarantella is part of the soundtrack for game Assassin's Creed II (2009)
- The "Puppy Love" level of Earthworm Jim 2 uses both Tarantella Napoletana and Funiculì, Funiculà as music.

== Literature ==
- Hilaire Belloc's poem "Tarantella" (1929) mimics in words the progress of the dance, culminating in the stillness of death. Online versions of the poem vary: a reliable printed version can be found in The Oxford Book of Modern Verse.
- In Henrik Ibsen's play A Doll's House, a performance of the tarantella is central to the plot.
- Edgar Allan Poe's short story "The Gold-Bug" (1843) features the introductory lines, "What ho! What ho! This fellow is dancing mad. He has been bitten by the tarantella", which Poe ascribes to a 1761 play by Arthur Murphy, although the lines do not appear in the play.
- Tim Powers' novel Medusa's Web (2015) uses the 18/8 version of the tarantella and its effect on (supernatural) spiders as a plot device.
- In Susan Sontag's novel The Volcano Lover: A Romance (1992), Lady Emma Hamilton shocks her company by dancing a tarantella.
- In Carolina De Robertis' novel The Gods of Tango (2015), the crowd at the port of Naples sings a tarantella to send off the new emigrants to Buenos Aires.

== Comics ==
- In Axis Powers Hetalia, Southern Italy/Romano cures his disease by dancing the tarantella with Spain; one of the songs sung by him, "The Delicious Tomato Song", is a tarantella.
