= Tarantella (disambiguation) =

Tarantella is a type of Italian folk dance.

Tarantella or Tarantelle (in French) may also refer to:

== Film and television ==
- Tarantella (1940 film), a short film
- Tarantella (1995 film), a film with Mira Sorvino and Matthew Lillard
- "Tarantella" (Grimm), an episode of Grimm

== Other uses ==
- Tarantella (ballet), a ballet choreographed by George Balanchine
- Tarantella (catamaran), a historic catamaran designed by Nathanael Greene Herreshoff
- Tarantelle (Chopin), a short piano piece in tarantella form by Frédéric Chopin
- Tarantella (horse) (foaled 1830), a British Thoroughbred racehorse
- Tarantella, Inc., a software company
- Tarantella Night Club, a building in Western Australia

== See also ==
- Nocturne and Tarantella (Szymanowski), a composition for violin and piano
- Tarantella Serpentine, a character in The Illuminatus! Trilogy
- Gabriella Tarantello (born 1958), Italian mathematician
- Tarantula (disambiguation)
- Tarentel (band), a band based in San Francisco, California
