= List of compositions by Gioachino Rossini =

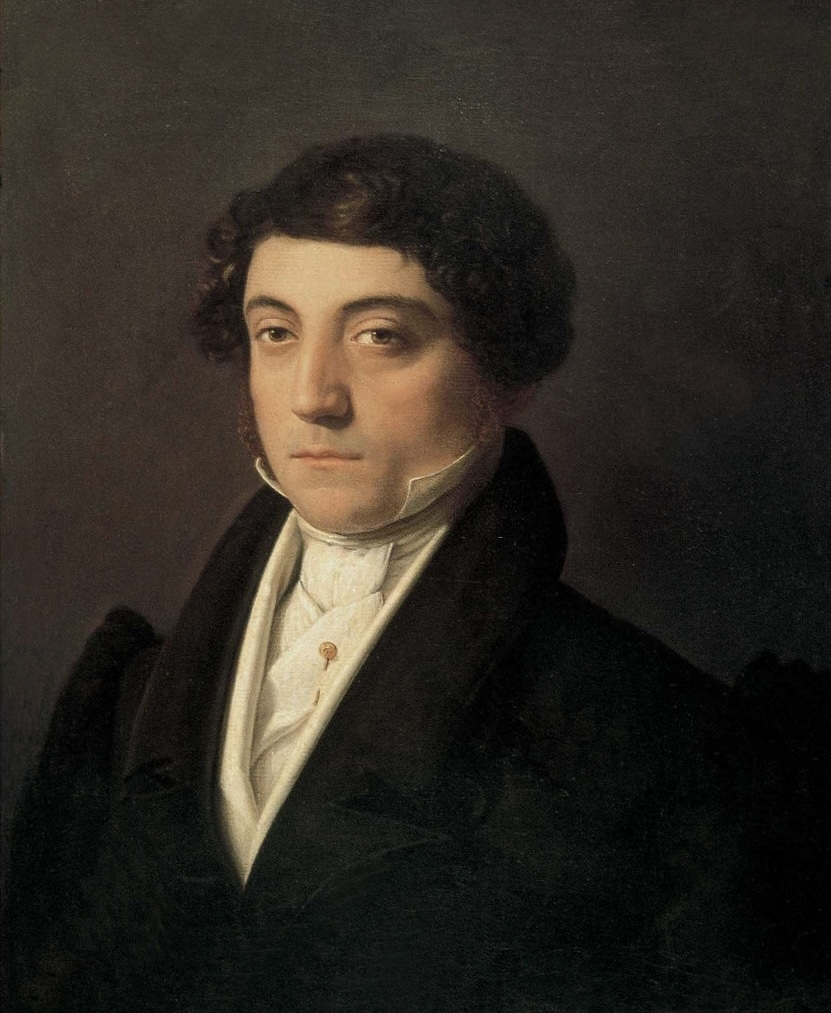
Portrait of Gioachino Rossini by Vincenzo Camuccini, Museo Teatrale alla Scala in Milan.

This is a list of the works of the Italian composer Gioachino Rossini (1792–1868).

== Operas ==
See List of operas by Gioachino Rossini.

== Incidental music ==
- Edipo a Colono (1817)

== Cantatas ==
- Il pianto d'armonia sulla morte di Orfeo (1808)
- La morte di Didone (1811)
- Dalle quete e pallid'ombre (1812)
- Egle ed Irene (1814)
- L'aurora (1815)
- Le nozze di Teti e di Peleo (1816)
- Omaggio umiliato (1819)
- Cantata... 9 maggio 1819 (1819)
- Argene e Melania. Cantata profana per soli, coro e orchestra. Unpublished. First performed as La Riconoscenza - Cantata a quattro voci in 1821.
- Giunone (before 1822)
- La santa alleanza (1822)
- Il vero omaggio (1822)
- Omaggio pastorale (1823)
- Il pianto delle muse in morte di Lord Byron (1824)
- Cantata per il battesimo del figlio del banchiere Aguado (1827)
- L'armonica cetra del nune (1830)
- Giovanna d'Arco (1832, when it was written with piano accompaniment for Olympe Pélissier; it was revised in 1859 for Marietta Alboni. It is often performed in an orchestral arrangement by Salvatore Sciarrino, which dates from 1989. It was commissioned by the Rossini Opera Festival, where it was premiered by Teresa Berganza with the conductor Alberto Zedda.)
- Cantata in onore del sommo pontefice Pio IX (1847)

== Instrumental music ==
- Sei sonate a quattro Six string sonatas (Rossini) (1804)
  - Sonata No. 1 in G major
  - Sonata No. 2 in A major
  - Sonata No. 3 in C major
  - Sonata No. 4 in B♭ major
  - Sonata No. 5 in E♭ major
  - Sonata No. 6 in D major
- Sinfonia "al conventello" (1806)
- Cinque duets pour cor (1806)
- Sinfonia (1808, used in L'inganno felice)
- Sinfonia (1809, used in La cambiale di matrimonio et Adelaide di Borgogna)
- Sinfonia "obbligata a contrabasso" (1807–10)
- Variazioni di clarinetto (o oboé, crossed out) (1809)
- Quartetto per flauto, clarinetto, fagotto e corno (1810?)
- Andante e tema con variazioni (1812)
- Introduction, Theme and Variations for Clarinet and Orchestra (1819)
- Andante e tema con variazioni per arpa e violino (1820)
- Passo doppio 1822 (variations on di tanti palpiti from tancredi)
- Valse (1823)
- Serenata (1823)
- Duetto per Violoncello e Contrabasso (1824)
- Rendez-vous de chasse (1828)
- Fantaisie (1829)
- Trois marches militaires (1837)
- Concerto per fagotto ed orchestra (1845, attributed to Rossini, authenticity questionable)
- Scherzo (1843)
- Tema originale di Rossini variato per violino da Giovacchino Giovacchini (1845)
- Marcia (1852)
- Thème de Rossini suivi de deux variations et coda par Moscheles père (1860)
- La corona d'Italia (1868)

== Sacred music ==
- Quoniam (1813)
- Messa di Gloria (1820)
- Preghiera (1820)
- Tantum ergo (1824)
- Stabat mater (first version 1831, second version 1841)
- Trois choeurs religieux ("La foi, l'espérance, la charité," 1844)
- Tantum ergo (1847)
- O Salutaris Hostia (1857)
- Laus Deo (1861)
- Petite messe solennelle (first version 1863, second version 1867)

== Secular vocal music ==
- Se il vuol la molinara (1801)
- Dolce aurette che spirate (1810)
- La mia pace io già perdei (1812)
- Qual voce, quai note (1813)
- Alla voce della gloria (1813)
- Amore mi assisti (1814)
- Il trovatore (1818)
- Il carnevale di Venezia (Rome, 1821)
- Belta crudele (1821)
- La pastorella (1821)
- Canzonetta spagnuola (1821)
- Infelice ch'io son (1821)
- Addio ai viennesi (1822)
- Dall'oriente l'astro del giorno (1824)
- Ridiamo, cantiamo, che tutto sen va (1824)
- In giorno si bello (London, 1824)
- Tre quartetti da camera (1827)
- Les adieux à Rome (1827)
- Orage et beau temps (1829/30)
- La passeggiata (Madrid, 1831)
- La dichiarazione (1834)
- Les soirées musicales (1830–1835)
  - La promessa
  - La regata veneziana
  - L'invito
  - La gita in gondola
  - Il rimprovero
  - La pastorella dell'Alphi
  - La partenza
  - La pesca
  - La Danza
  - La serenata
  - L'orgia
  - Li marinara
- Deux nocturnes: 1. Adieu a l'Italie, 2. Le départ (1836)
- Nizza (1836)
- L'âme délaissée (1844)
- Francesca da Rimini (1848)
- Mi lagnerò tacendo (1858)

== Péchés de vieillesse ==
- Vol I Album italiano
- Vol II Album français
- Vol III Morceaux réservés
- Vol IV Quatre hors-d’œuvre et quatre mendiants
- Vol V Album pour les enfants adolescents
- Vol VI Album pour les enfants dégourdis
- Vol VII Album de chaumière
- Vol VIII Album de château
- Vol IX Album pour piano, violon, violoncelle, harmonium et cor
- Vol X Miscellanées pour piano
- Vol XI Miscellanées de musique vocale
- Vol XII Quelques riens pour album
- Vol XIII Musique anodine
- Vol XIV Altri péchés de vieillesse

== Wrongly attributed to Rossini ==
- Duetto buffo di due gatti (The Cat Duet)
