= Alessandra Belloni =

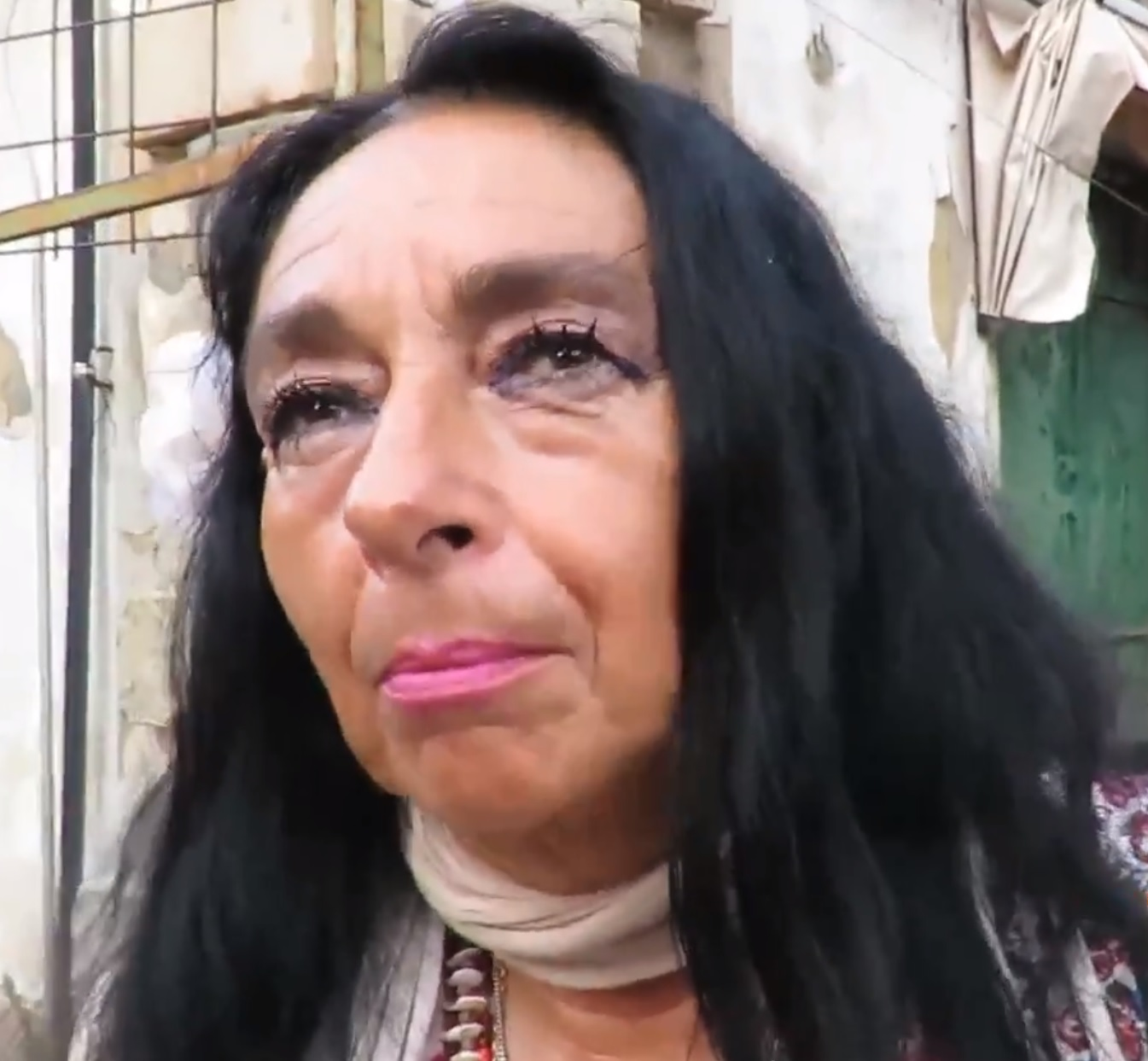
- Belloni at the Feast of the Black Madonna in Seminara in 2018

Background information
- Born: July 24, 1954 (age 72); Rome
- Origin: New York City
- Genres: Folk, world music
- Occupations: Drummer, singer, dancer, teacher, actress
- Instrument: Tambourine
- Years active: 1976–present
- Website: alessandrabelloni.com

Alessandra Belloni (born July 24, 1954 in Rome) is an Italian musician, singer, dancer, actress, choreographer, teacher, and ethnomusicologist. Her instrument is the Southern Italian tambourine and her music and dance are focused on the traditional roots of tarantella. Her studies of tarantism are rooted in the culture of Apulia and Calabria, expressing it from women's point of view. Her work has gained international appreciation, especially in the United States and Brazil. She is artist in residence at the Cathedral of St. John the Divine.

== Biography ==
Alessandra Belloni was born in Rome, daughter of a marble stoneworker and a mother from a musical family of Rocca di Papa. Her maternal grandfather worked as a baker but was famous in his village for playing music, especially tambourine. At the age of 17 in 1971, Belloni moved to New York to visit her sister and pursue a career in music. In 1974, she studied acting at HB Studio and briefly acted in films, playing a Turkish princess in the film Fellini's Casanova, for which she learned belly dance. At New York University she studied under Dario Fo. She studied voice with Michael Warren and Walter Blazer.

While back in Italy, she decided that film was not to be her career. Federico Fellini advised her:

Io ho notato che tu sei molto seria... sei un'artista. Tu non sei come quelle che stanno qua. Sai che te dico: che tu devi torna' a New York. Non resta' qua perché se io avessi potuto fare quello che faccio qua in America, se sapessi meglio l'inglese, l'avrei fatto.

(I notice that you are very serious... you're an artist. You are not like the other girls here... You know what I say? You've got to return to New York. Don't stay here because if I had been able to do in America what I do here, if I knew English better, I would have done it.)

In 1980, she co-founded, with John La Barbera, the music, folk dance, and theater group I Giullari di Piazza ('the town square players'), which has performed in the United States and Europe, and is in residency at the Cathedral of St. John the Divine. She studied traditional tambourine technique with the Sicilian percussionist Alfio Antico, renowned for his ability to create "magical and primordial" atmospheres. She has also worked with percussionist Glen Velez, the leading figure in the revival of frame drumming in America, whom she met in 1982 through her work in Bread and Puppet Theater. Velez gave her a book, La Terra del Rimorso (The Land of Remorse) by Ernesto De Martino, which inspired her to study Apulian tarantism. Beginning in 1984, Belloni has taken part in the feast of San Rocco of Torrepaduli in Salento, Apulia, a traditional summer event for tambourines and pizziche. Her former husband's name was Dario Bollini.

== Work ==
The traditional dance she teaches is presented as an ancient healing ritual for women suffering from repressed sexuality, abuse, powerlessness, and the feeling of being caught in a web that binds them. Belloni emphasizes that tarantella music and dance, as popularly known today around the world, is different from its origins in Apulian folk culture, going back to the ancient Greeks. The "spider bite" or tarantismo, being psychosexual injury, formerly called hysteria, affects women with depression and loneliness, and can be healed by drumming and dancing the ancient pizzica tarantata. Belloni teaches that a woman suffering from such "bite" is called a tarantata, and the music and dance for healing it is called pizzica, referring to the spider's bite. By dancing oneself into ecstatic trance with the support of the community, a sufferer seeks to expel the "venom" and be restored to health.

Belloni has integrated her work studying women's therapeutic dance and drumming with traditions of the Black Madonna in several countries, including the Madonna of Montevergine in Campania. Like many before her, she connects devotion to the Black Madonna with pre-Christian Goddess worship dating back to the ancient Greeks, who colonized Apulia as part of Magna Graecia long before the rise of Rome.

Belloni has brought into her art influences from song and drumming of Brazil, invoking Yemanjá and Oshun. For example, in "Canto di Sant'Irene" she sings "In Calabria è Maria / Yemanjá è a Bahia" ('In Calabria she is Mary; she is Yemanjá in Bahia'). In connection with Yemanjá, Belloni plays the Remo ocean drum, which produces ocean wave-like sounds. In addition to revivifying traditional music, she has composed an oeuvre of original songs inspired by Black Madonnas and others on Brazilian themes, as well as love songs after the Italian tradition. She has also worked to integrate her music with African drumming, saying: "It appeals to me, because I do believe that this form of music therapy and this healing drumming originated in Southern Italy, but in the history most of it comes from Africa, because Africa is closer to us than Northern Europe. All of this connected in the ancient times, and it makes a lot of sense to do it now in America, because it really is like continuing the normal evolution of this music."

Belloni conducts dance therapy workshops, titled "Rhythm is the Cure," in New York, Italy, and other places in the United States and Europe. Participants dress in white with red sashes. Since 2009, she has led a New York City troupe of women drummers named the Daughters of Cybele.

Belloni's stage shows Rhythm Is the Cure and Tarantella Spider Dance are productions combining music, tammuriata dance and drumming, drama, fire dance, and aerial dance. Spider Dance starts with the birth of Spider Woman and traces the development of pizzica tarantata tradition from ancient Greek rituals of Cybele and Dionysus to Italian folk tradition.

The Remo drum company produces a signature line of Alessandra Belloni tambourines depicting the Black Madonna of Montserrat.

== Discography ==
=== With I Giullari di Piazza ===
- 1995: Earth, Sun & Moon - Lyrichord 7427
- 2009: Tarantella Spider Dance (self-published)

=== Solo ===
- 2000: Tarantata: Dance of the Ancient Spider Sounds True MM 00117D
- 2002: Tarantelle and Canti d'Amore - Naxos World 760492
- 2007: Daughter of the Drum (self-published)

== See also ==
- Women in dance
- Women in music
- Women in Italy

== Bibliography ==
- Alessandra Belloni, Rhythm Is the Cure: Southern Italian Tambourine book and instructional CD set. Pacific, Missouri: Mel Bay, 2007. ISBN 9780786676774.
- Alessandra Belloni, Healing Journeys With the Black Madonna: Chants, Music, and Sacred Practices of the Great Goddess. Rochester, Vermont: Bear & Company, 2019. ISBN 9781591433422.
- Incoronata Inserra, Global Tarantella: Reinventing Southern Italian Folk Music and Dances. Champaign: University of Illinois Press, 2017. ISBN 9780252099892. Chapter 4 is an in-depth interview with Alessandra Belloni.
