= Robert Irving (conductor) =

British conductor (1913–1991)

Robert Irving, signed photograph

Robert Augustine Irving, DFC*, (28 August 1913 – 13 September 1991) was a British conductor whose reputation was mainly as a ballet conductor.

Born in Winchester, England, the son of mountaineer and author R. L. G. Irving, he was educated at Winchester College and New College, Oxford, graduating with a degree in music. He studied with Malcolm Sargent and Constant Lambert at the Royal College of Music from 1934 to 1936. Irving conducted the Oxford University Opera Club's 1934 production of Castor et Pollux.

During World War II, he served with the Royal Air Force, and was awarded the Distinguished Flying Cross (DFC) and bar for two tours as a navigator in anti-shipping strike squadrons. He was the first Captain-Navigator in the Royal Air Force, opening the way for navigators to captain aircraft. An attempt by Dickie Richardson to recruit him to the post-war RAF was turned down in favour of conducting. He left with the rank of Squadron Leader.

He then became assistant conductor with the BBC Scottish Symphony Orchestra, and was conductor and musical director of Sadler's Wells Ballet from 1949 to 1958, working closely with Sir Frederick Ashton on several ballets. Having assisted Ashton in choosing music for his Picnic at Tintagel for New York City Ballet in 1952, Irving helped the choreographer to surmount musical problems in the last act of his Sylvia in September the same year, by interpolating passages from the same composer's La source. In 1956, in celebration of the 25th anniversary of the Vic-Wells, now the Royal Ballet, Irving arranged music by Alexander Glazunov for a "grand pas de quatorze" by Ashton, Birthday Offering.

In 1954 he introduced and conducted music from Act II of Swan Lake with Margot Fonteyn and Michael Somes for television, and in 1958 for BBC television he conducted the Philharmonia Orchestra in Les Sylphides with Nadia Nerina and Philip Chatfield. He conducted the 1957 telecast of Ashton's Cinderella on NBC in the series Producers' Showcase.

From 1958 to 1989, he served as music director of the New York City Ballet, where he worked extensively with choreographer George Balanchine. For many years he conducted the New York City Ballet's annual production of The Nutcracker, a task he repeated in the 1958 US telecast of the ballet. In 1960 and 1963, he conducted in the Naumburg Orchestral Concerts, in the Naumburg Bandshell, Central Park, in the summer series.

He died in his birthplace in 1991, aged 78. A small memorial plaque to him may be found on the north-east wall of Winchester College chapel cloisters.

== Discography ==
Irving's many recordings of ballet music include:

- Massenet Le Cid (ballet music) and Meyerbeer (arr Lambert) Les Patineurs, London Symphony Orchestra, for Decca 1952
- Ballet music from La Boutique fantasque and Gounod's Faust with the Philharmonia Orchestra in 1952 for HMV
- Walton's Façade suites with the London Symphony Orchestra, for Decca 1953
- Arnold's Homage to the Queen Suite, Op.42 and his Eight English Dances, Opp.27 & 33 with the Philharmonia Orchestra for HMV in 1953
- The five-movement suite from Ashton and Lambert's ballet Horoscope with the London Symphony Orchestra for Decca in 1953.
- Tchaikovsky's Swan Lake (excerpts) with the Philharmonia in 1953, and The Sleeping Beauty with the Orchestra of the Royal Opera House, Covent Garden in 1955 both for HMV
- A near complete Sylvia with the Philharmonia Orchestra for HMV in 1954
- The Gluck-Mottl Ballet Suite and ballet music from Grétry's Céphale et Procris with the New Symphony Orchestra of London for Decca in 1955
- His own arrangement of the Glazunov music for ballet Birthday Offering, with the Royal Philharmonic Orchestra in 1956 for HMV.
- An abridged Giselle with the Philharmonia Orchestra in 1961 for HMV.
- Suites from Shostakovich The Golden Age Op.22a and Bartók The Miraculous Mandarin, Sz73 with the Philharmonia Orchestra for EMI in 1961

Non-dance music recorded by him includes:

- Grieg Peer Gynt Suite No. 2, Op. 55 with the London Symphony Orchestra in 1952 for HMV.
- Dohnányi Suite in F-sharp minor, Op. 19, coupled with Tchaikovsky's Hamlet, Op. 67, with the Philharmonia Orchestra, for HMV in 1954
- Turina's La procesión del Rocio, Op. 9, and Danzas fantásticas, Op. 22, Royal Philharmonic Orchestra, HMV
- Arnold's Four Scottish Dances, Op. 59, along with Britten's Matinées musicales, Op. 24 and Soirées musicales, Op. 9, for HMV in 1957
- Irving contributed six tracks to the 1961 EMI LP 'Musical Merry-Go-Round' which attempted to recreate the effect of a revolving sound, using left and right stereo channels.

== Awards ==
- Capezio Dance Award, 1975
- Dance Magazine Award, 1984
