= Canzoniere Grecanico Salentino =

Italian traditional music ensemble

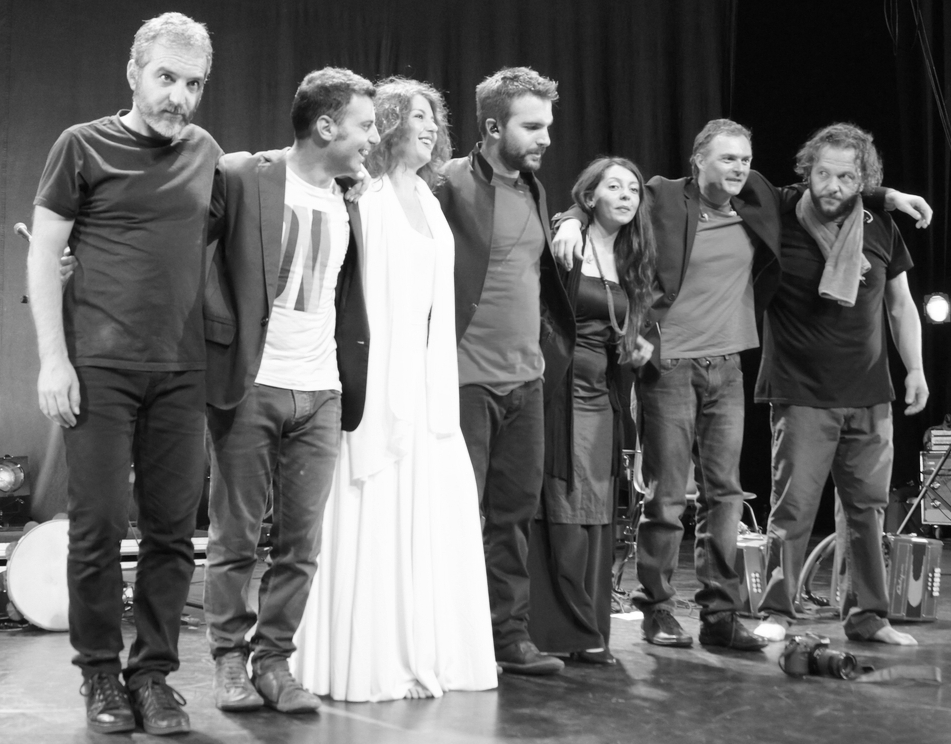
- Canzoniere Grecanico Salentino performing live on Druga godba festival in Ljubljana, Slovenia, 30 May 2015

Background information
- Origin: Lecce, Salento, Italy
- Genres: Pizzica, world music, folk
- Years active: 1975–present
- Labels: Ponderosa music&art
- Website: www.canzonieregrecanicosalentino.net

Canzoniere Grecanico Salentino (CGS), formed by writer Rina Durante in 1975, is a traditional music ensemble from Salento, Italy. The seven-piece band and dancer perform a contemporary style of Southern Italy's traditional Pizzica music and dance.

According to the group's website, it has performed with musical artists including Ballaké Sissoko, Ibrahim Maalouf, Piers Faccini, composer Ludovico Einaudi, and drummer Stewart Copeland of The Police. CGS opened the Concertone of La Notte della Taranta in Melpignano in front of over 100,000 people.

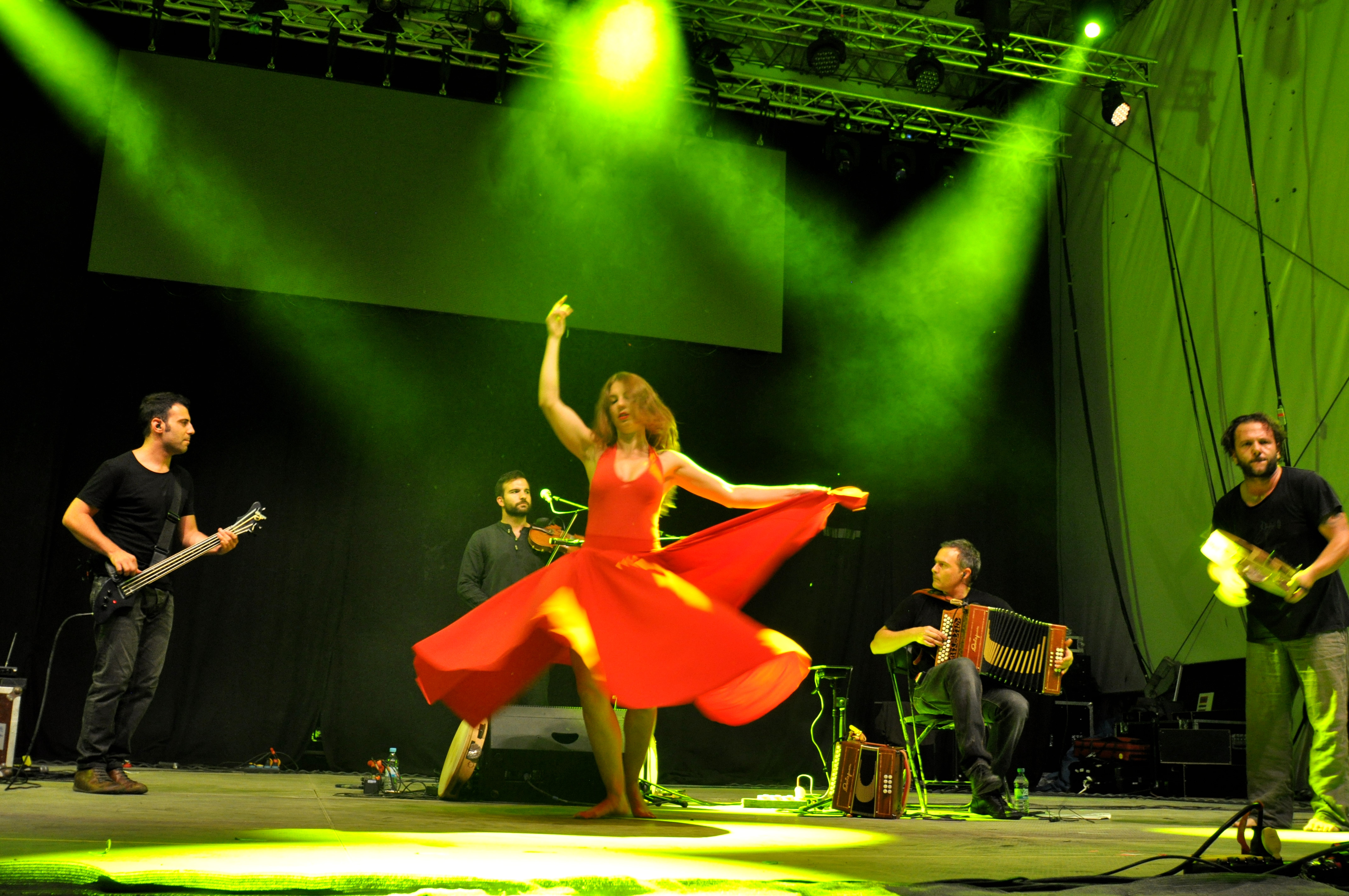
Canzoniere Grecanico Salentino performing 2015 at the Horizonte music festival in Koblenz, Ehrenbreitstein Fortress

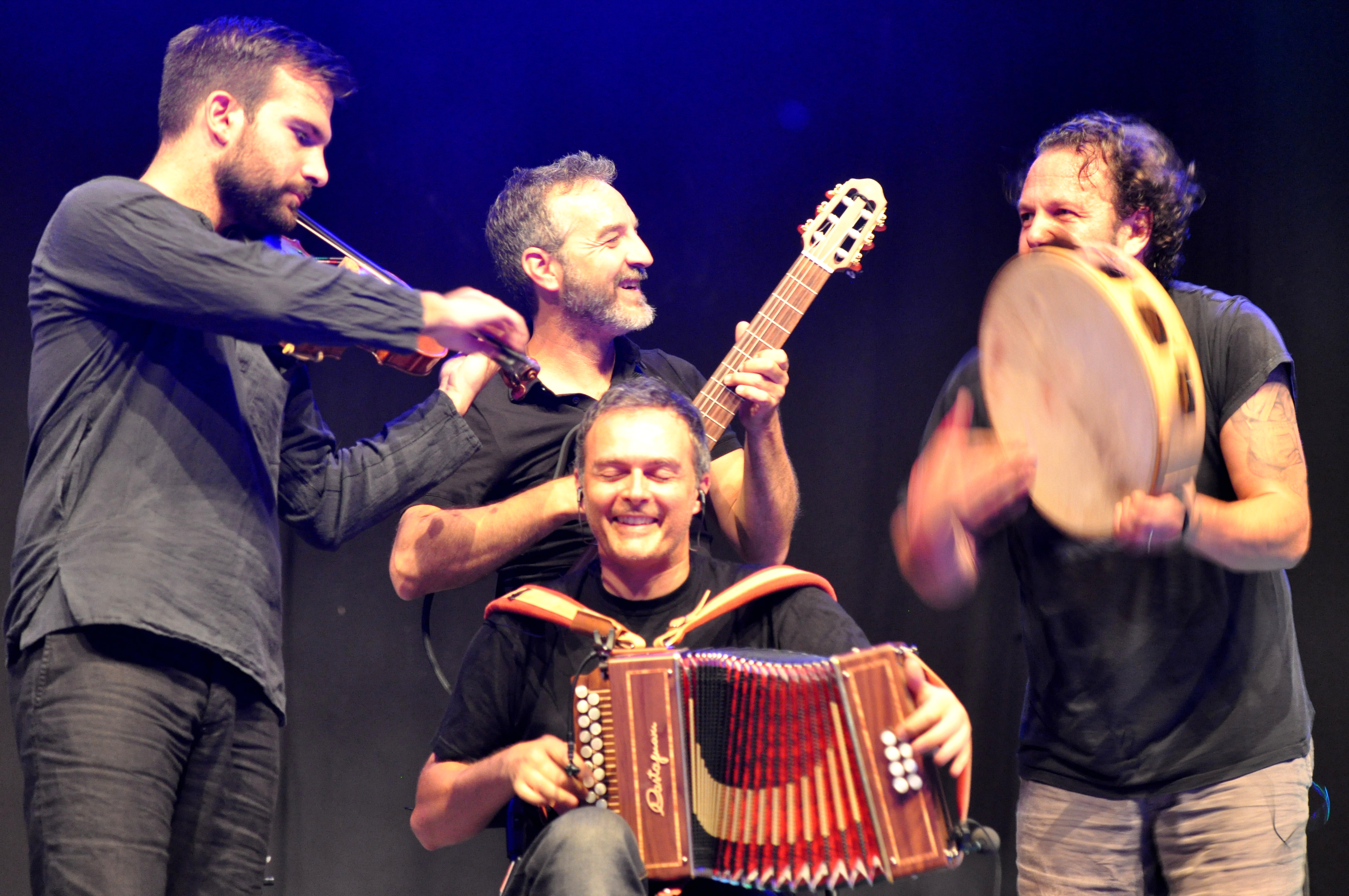
Canzoniere Grecanico Salentino performing 2015 at the Horizonte music festival in Koblenz, Ehrenbreitstein Fortress

Based in Lecce, the group performs concerts under the direction of fiddler and drummer Mauro Durante. Durante took over as bandleader from his father, Daniele Durante, in 2007. Previously, Durante was the musical assistant to Einaudi, Maestro Concertatore of the La Notte della Taranta festival.

CGS has recorded 18 albums and performed in the United States, Canada, Europe, and the Middle East. In 2010, CGS was awarded Best Italian World Music Group at the Meeting of Independent Labels festival in Italy.

In 2015, they released Quaranta (40), an album recorded live-to-tape without overdubs and produced by Ian Brennan.

== Band members ==
- Mauro Durante, frame drums, violin, vocals
- Emanuele Licci, bouzuki, classical guitar, vocals
- Alessia Tondo, vocals
- Silvia Perrone, dance
- Giulio Bianco, harmonica, zampogna (Italian bagpipes), recorder
- Massimiliano Morabito, diatonic accordion
- Giancarlo Paglialunga, tamburello, vocals

== Discography ==
- 1977 – Canti di Terra d'Otranto e della Grecia Salentina
- 1980 – Concerto 1
- 1983 – Come farò a diventare un mito
- 1985 – Concerto 2
- 1988 – Canzoniere Grecanico Salentino
- 1991 – Concerto 3
- 1994 – Sutt'acqua e sutta ientu navegamu
- 1994 – Mamminieddhu Zuccaratu
- 1997 – Ni pizzicau lu core
- 1998 – Ballati tutti quanti ballati forte
- 2000 – Canti e pizzichi d'amore
- 2000 – Carataranta
- 2001 – Pizzica pizzica
- 2002 – Alla riva del mare
- 2002 – Serenata
- 2010 – Focu d'amore
- 2012 – Pizzica Indiavolata
- 2015 – Quaranta
- 2017 – Canzoniere

== Awards and nominations ==
- 2010 – Best Italian World Music Band – MEI's confab
- 2011 – Babel Med Music selection
- 2012 – globalFEST NYC selection
- 2012 – Womex selection
- 2013 – SXSW selection
- 2013 – Montreal International Jazz Festival selection
- 2013 – Womad selection

== See also ==
- Tarantism
- Grecìa Salentina
