= Tarantula (disambiguation) =

Tarantulas are a group of hairy and often very large spiders belonging to the family Theraphosidae.

Tarantula may also refer to:

== Fiction ==
- Tarantulas (Transformers), a character in Beast Wars: Transformers
- Tarantula (poetry collection), a book of poetry by Bob Dylan
- Tarantula (novel), a crime novel by Thierry Jonquet
- Tarantula (DC Comics), the name of two different characters from DC Comics
- Tarantula (Marvel Comics), the name of a number of villains from Marvel Comics

=== Film ===
- The Tarantula, a 1916 silent film
- Tarantula (film), a 1955 science fiction film directed by Jack Arnold
- Tarantula (TV series), an American animated television series
- Tarantulas: The Deadly Cargo, a 1977 horror film directed by Stuart Hagmann

== Music ==
- The Tarantulas, a surf guitar band
- Tarantula (band), a Portuguese heavy metal band
- Tarantulas Records, a record label

=== Albums ===
- Tarantula (Riverdales album)
- Tarantula (Ride album)
- Tarantula (Mystikal album)
- Tarántula, an album by Mónica Naranjo
- Tarantula (Flickerstick album)
- Tarantula (Tarantula album), 1987

=== Songs ===
- "Tarantula" (Faithless song)
- "Tarantula" (The Smashing Pumpkins song)
- "Tarantula" (Mystikal song)
- "Tarantula", a 1982 song by Colourbox
  - "Tarantula", a 1986 cover by This Mortal Coil on Filigree & Shadow
  - "Tarantula", a 2019 cover by Beck on Music Inspired By The Film Roma
- "Tarantula / Fasten Your Seatbelt", a song by drum & bass band Pendulum
- "Tarantula", a song by The Aquabats on the album The Return of The Aquabats
- "Tarantula", a song by Bob Schneider on the album Lovely Creatures
- "Tarantula", a song by Gorillaz on the album Cracker Island
- "Tarantula", a song by Jean-Luc Ponty on the album Imaginary Voyage

== Ships ==
- Tarantula, a 1902 steam yacht converted into the World War I torpedo boat HMCS Tuna
- Tarantula, a 1913 steam yacht converted into a World War I patrol boat

== Other uses ==
- Tarantula Nebula (NGC 2070), an H II region in the Large Magellanic Cloud (LMC)

== See also ==
- Atypical tarantula, spiders of the family Atypidae
- Dwarf tarantula, spiders of the family Mecicobothriidae
- Lycosa tarantula, a species of wolf spider native to Taranto, Italy
- Tarantella, a traditional dance associated with the spider
- Tarantism, a dancing mania associated with Lycosa tarantula and the tarantella
