= Tarantula (comics) =

Tarantula, in comics, may refer to:

- Tarantula (DC Comics) is the name of two characters from DC Comics
- Tarantula (Marvel Comics) is the name of five characters from Marvel Comics, two of whom are villains that fought Spider-Man
- Tarantula is the name of a character from Atlas/Seaboard Comics
- Tarantulas (Transformers), a Predacon in the Beast Wars series that has appeared in the comic books based on the toy

It may also refer to:

- Black Tarantula, a Marvel Comics character

== See also ==
- Tarantula (disambiguation)
