= Notte della Taranta =

Annual summer folk music festival in Apulia, Italy

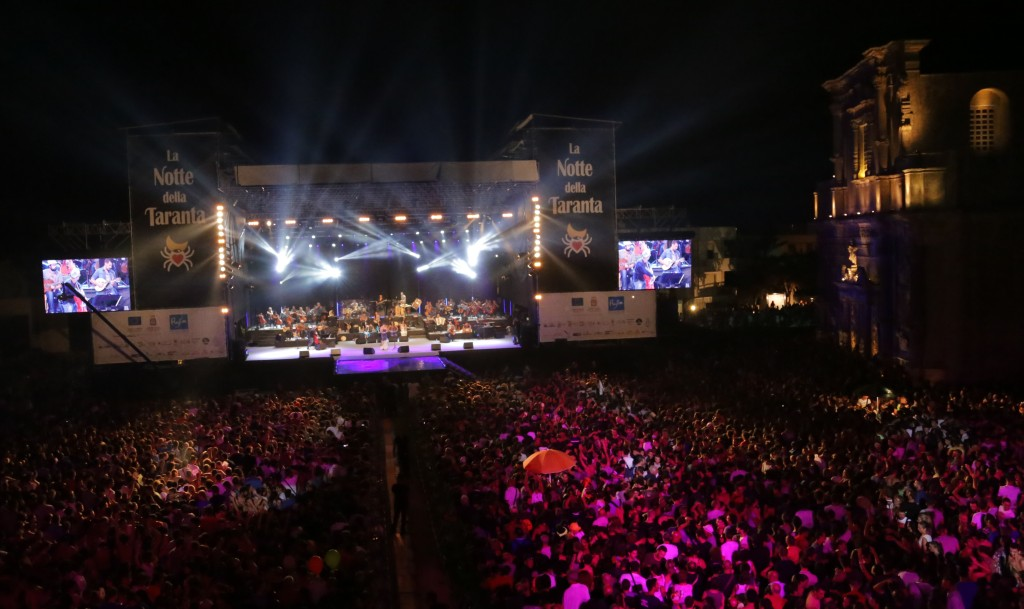
Notte della Taranta in 2013

Notte della Taranta ('Taranta Night') is a music festival in Salento, Italy.

The Notte della Taranta is focused on pizzica, a popular folk genre in Salento, and takes place in various municipalities in the province of Lecce and the Grecìa Salentina, especially in Melpignano. It gives great importance to the folk music tradition of taranta and pizzica, and it is a resource for tourism in Apulia.

The festival tours around Salento, normally culminating in a grand finale concert in Melpignano in August, which lasts until late night. An average of 120,000 spectators attend the last concert every year. The festival started in 1998 by an initiative of several municipalities of the Salento, which sponsored the event. Every year a new musical director is chosen.

In 2015, Ludovico Einaudi released his album Taranta Project, inspired by his time directing the festival.
