= John T. La Barbera =

American guitarist, arranger, and composer

John La Barbera is an American musical composer and arranger. He currently teaches at the Bergen Community College in Paramus, New Jersey, and has written for Acoustic Guitar magazine.

La Barbera holds a M.M. from William Paterson University and a B.M. from the University of Hartford Hartt School, and graduate courses at Hunter College (NYC) in ethnomusicology, Villa Schifanoia (Rosary College), in Florence, Italy and at the Accademia Chigiana in Siena, Italy, the film music seminar with Ennio Morricone.

== Awards and commissions ==
La Barbera has won several awards and commissions for his musical compositions. he was commissioned in 1996 by Lincoln Center for the Performing Arts, The Martin Gruss Foundation, and the New York State Council on the Arts, to compose The Dance of the Ancient Spider, which premiered at Alice Tully Hall. Barbera was also commissioned by the Cathedral of St. John the Divine in New York City to compose the Opera: Stabat Mater-Donna Di Paradiso.

== Film composing credits ==
Film composing credits include: documentary film Sacco and Vanzetti (2007) awarded best historical film from the American Historical Association; Pane Amaro (2007) RAI-National Italian TV network; What's Up Scarlet? (2006); Children of Fate (1992), nominated for a Best Documentary Feature Academy Award and winner of the 1993 Sundance Film Festival; La Festa, (1998); Tarantella, (1997); and Neapolitan Heart (2002).

== Theater credits ==
La Barbera has been credited for multiple off-Broadway theater productions as musical director.

== Composer of original folk operas ==
- Stabat Mater: Donna di Paradiso (1995)
- The Voyage of the Black Madonna (1990)
- The Dance of the Ancient Spider (1996)
- La Lupa- the She-Wolf (1987)
- The Adventures of Don Giovanni and His Servant Pulcinella (1987)
- La Cantata dei Pastori (1985)

== Film appearances ==
- When In Rome, (band leader/mandolinist) directed by Mark Steven Johnson with Danny DeVito and Anjelica Huston.
- Neapolitan Heart (2002), directed by Paulo Santoni, Ready Made productions, Italy, with Jimmy Roselli.
- The Moon in The Gutter (1983), Jean-Jacques Bieneix, Gaumont-Cinecitta, Italy, with Gérard Depardieu.
