= Druga godba =

- Genre: World music
- Dates: Last week in May
- Locations: Various locations in Ljubljana, Slovenia
- Years active: 1984–present
- Founded: 1984, Ljubljana, Slovenia
- Website: www.drugagodba.si

Druga godba is a world music festival organized yearly in Ljubljana, Slovenia.

Druga godba (English: That Other Music Festival) is one of the most important music festivals in Central Europe. Its concept, variety of new approaches and enthusiasm for less well-known music from across the globe is unique to this part of the world.

== History ==
Druga godba Festival was established in 1984 in Ljubljana. Its programme was primarily concerned with different kinds of varieties in music: alternative rock, rock in opposition, adventurous new jazz, improvised music and experimental music, as well as rediscovered Slovenian folk music. Druga godba was the first festival in the former Yugoslavia to introduce popular musics and styles from the Third World, including reggae and various styles of African music. In 1990 the Druga Godba organisation became a member of the European Forum of Worldwide Music Festivals (EFWMF). This is a network of 43 festivals and 13 associate council members from 20 European countries, and incorporates a wide range of European world music festivals of the very highest quality. Druga godba won a Župančič Award in 2006 for an original festival concept. In May 2008 Druga godba worked with the Slovenian Tourist Board on a campaign to promote Slovenia in the United States. Two special musical events were organised in New York City in collaboration with National Geographic Traveler – the first in Joe’s Pub, the legendary jazz venue, which played host to the group Godalika and guests, as well as Fake Orchestra, and the second at the Town Hall, with a concert which featured Laibach, Bratko Bibič and Guy Klucevsek, Vasko Atanasovski, Marc Ribot and Greg Cohen, Brina, Zlatko Kaučič, Silence and Katalena. Every year since 2011, Druga godba has been selected as one of the 25 best international festivals in the world by the British world music magazine Songlines. In 2015 Druga godba Festival will be organized from 28 to 30 May on various locations in Ljubljana -- Cankar Hall, Kino Šiška, Metelkova and Stara Mestna Elektrarna.

== Performances ==
Musicians which performed on Druga godba :

- Afro-Cuban All Stars
- Akua Naru
- Andy Palacio
- Aziza Brahim
- Batida
- Blitz the Ambassador
- Bombino
- Bossa de Novo
- Božo Vrećo
- Bratko Bibič
- Brina
- Buckwheat Zydeco
- Canzoniere Grecanico Salentino
- Cesária Évora
- Catch-Pop String-Strong
- Cheb Mami
- Chicago Underground Duo
- Damir Imamović
- Data Processed Corrupted
- Dennis Bovell
- D'Gary
- Djivan Gasparyan
- Elliott Sharp
- Ensemble Al-Kindi
- Fake Orchestra
- Foltin
- Fundamental
- Garmarna
- Getatchew Mekurya
- Godalika
- Gotan Project
- Greg Cohen
- Guy Klucevsek
- Hamza Shakur
- Hasna El Becharia
- Hayvanlar Alemi
- Hindi Zahra
- Huun-Huur-Tu
- Juana Molina
- Kaja Draksler
- Katalena
- Khaled
- Kimmo Pohjonen
- Krar Collective
- Laibach
- Las Migas
- Les Négresses Vertes
- Los de Abajo
- Madame Baheux
- Magnifico
- Marc Ribot
- Mariza
- Melt Yourself Down
- Mulatu Astatke
- Natacha Atlas
- Ned Rothenberg
- Noura Mint Seymali
- Nuru Kane
- Orchestra Baobab
- Orkestar Fejata Sejdića
- Oumou Sangare
- Peter Kowald
- Pixies
- Pixvae
- Rachid Taha
- Remmy Ongala
- Rubato
- Salif Keita
- Sam Mangwana
- Serbian Army Orchestra
- Sevdah Takht
- Shutka Roma Rap
- Silence
- Silvia Perez Cruz
- Sons of Kemet
- Spaceways Inc
- Terrafolk
- The Comet Is Coming
- The Ex
- The Gun Club
- The Lounge Lizards
- The Roots
- Tinariwen
- Toti Soler
- Trevor Watts Moire Music
- Tune-Yards
- Vasko Atanasovski
- Vinko Globokar
- Wang Li
- Yasmine Hamdan
- Youssou N'Dour
- Zlatko Kaučič
