= Albert Pieczonka =

- Born: February 10, 1828; Königsberg, East Prussia
- Died: April 12, 1912 (aged 84) Manhattan, New York, United States
- Occupations: Composer, pianist, music instructor
- Instrument: Piano

Albert Emil Theodor Pieczonka (February 10, 1828 – April 12, 1912) was a composer, pianist and music instructor who resided in Germany, England, and the United States. His most famous work, the "Tarantella in A Minor", remains a popular piano standard more than 100 years after his death.

== Early life and education ==
Albert Pieczonka was born in Königsberg on the Baltic coast of East Prussia.

Pieczonka was the youngest of three children born to Gotthilf Immanuel (1801–1872) and Friederike Caroline Dorothea (Rehlander) Pieczonka (1803-1853). He briefly attended the University of Königsberg before enrolling in the Leipzig Conservatory in 1847. This institution, the oldest music university in Germany, was founded by composer Felix Mendelssohn in 1843. While at the conservatory, Pieczonka studied under famed pianist Ignaz Moscheles (1794–1870). He may have also studied under Franz Liszt before undertaking a solo career.

== Career ==
In 1858, or thereabout, the Pieczonka family emigrated from continental Europe to London, England. In England, Pieczonka performed concerts and gave music lessons to children of the wealthy. It was in England that he composed several of his most recognized pieces including Dancing Waves, Polish Chivalry, and the Tarantella in A Minor.

In September 1880, Pieczonka emigrated to the United States. He arrived in New York on The Queen, a three masted steamer of the British National Line. The family eventually settled on the upper east side of Manhattan at 169 East 95th Street. During the 1880s, Pieczonka, his wife, and his daughters performed together throughout the United States as the Kempa Ladies’ Orchestra. Pieczonka also gave solo concerts at venues such as Carnegie Hall in New York and the Great Auditorium at Ocean Grove, New Jersey. His performances consistently garnered favorable reviews from the press. He continued to write music and to give music lessons until shortly before his death.

== Personal life ==
In 1855, Pieczonka married one of his students, Nancy "Nanny" Wohlgeboren (1836-1916). The couple had eight children, one of whom died as an infant. Two of the children, Ernst (1857-1877) and Fanny (1858-1886), were born in East Prussia. Alice (1859-1908), Kathe (1860-1938), Emily (1861-1915), Helen (1864-1896), Hans (1866-1867), and Eva (1867-1908), were born in London, England. Son, Ernst, was partially paralyzed as the result of a fall during childhood and died in England about 1876. Pieczonka's daughters’ lives were also marked by tragedy and were cut short by illness and accident. He outlived all but two of his children.

=== Death ===
Pieczonka died of pneumonia in his Manhattan home on April 12, 1912. He was survived by his wife and two daughters. His widow, Nancy, died on November 18, 1916. Following Pieczonka's death, a blurb appeared in the monthly music magazine Etude:

"Albert Pieconka, the pianist-teacher-composer who died recently in his eighty fifth year, bore a remarkable facial resemblace to Beethoven. He studied at the University of Konigsberg and also at Leipzig Conservatory, after which he made a series of concert tours in German. His success in London won him the friendship of such men as Liszt and Rubinstein. In America he was more particularly engaged in teaching and composing. His best known work is his Tarantella."

== Sources ==
- Clearly Piano Teaching (April 11, 1912) http://clearlypiano.blogspot.com/2012/04/happy-death-day-albert-pieczonka.html
- The Monthly Musical Record, Vol 23, Augener & Co., London, pages 103-104 (May 1, 1893)
- Richmond Notes, A Monthly Record, March 1863 to September 1868. Richmond Hiscoke and Son, Printers and Publishers: Castle Terrace, page 56 (1868).
- The Musical World, Vol. 38, Boosey and Sons, London, p. 290 (May 5, 1860)
- 1871 England Census.
- "London, England Electoral Registers, 1832–1965, Kensington and Chelsea for the years 1871, 1873 and 1875", Provo, Utah: Ancestry.com Operations, Inc. (2010).
- Jensen, Howard and Kristi Brown. New York City Police Census, 1890, Book 972, page 30. Provo, Utah: Ancestry.com Operations, Inc. (2001).
