= Soirées musicales =

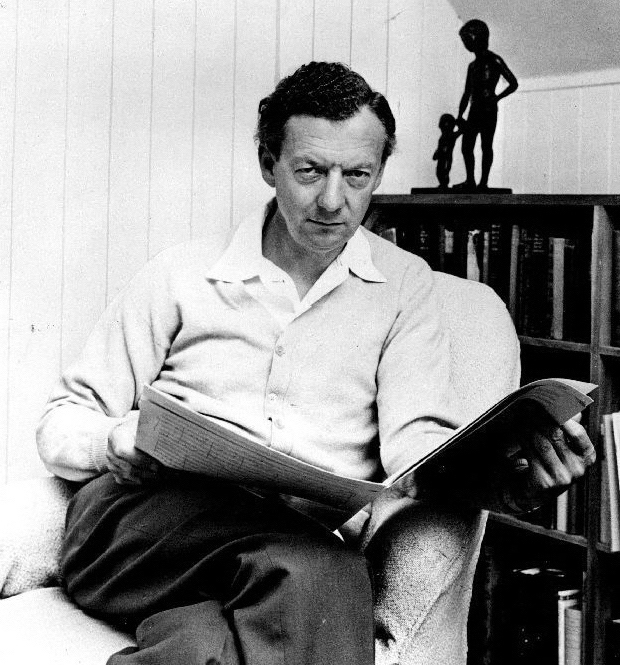
Benjamin Britten (1960s photograph)

Soirées musicales, (Musical Evenings), Op. 9, is a suite of five movements by Benjamin Britten, using music composed by Gioachino Rossini. The suite, first performed in 1937, derives its title from Rossini's collection of the same name, dating from the early 1830s, from which Britten drew much of the thematic material.

The five-movement suite was expanded from incidental music Britten had written for a film in 1935, and was quickly used as the basis of a ballet by Antony Tudor. Other choreographers, including George Balanchine created ballets using Britten's score.

== Background ==
In 1935 the young English composer Benjamin Britten started to work for the GPO Film Unit, mainly writing incidental music for promotional documentaries. One of his early works for the unit was the music for a five-minute short film called The Tocher. (Note: The Oxford English Dictionary defines "tocher" as "Scottish and northern dialect: The marriage portion which a wife brings to her husband; dowry"; the film shows a young Scotsman whose substantial Post Office Savings Account helps him win the hand and tocher of a young Scotswoman.) Using three melodies by the 19th-century composer Gioachino Rossini, Britten arranged a score for boys' voices, flute (doubling piccolo), oboe, clarinet, piano and percussion. The pieces he chose were the soldiers' march from William Tell, and two pieces from Rossini's collection Soirées musicales: a canzonetta "La promessa" (The Promise), and a bolero, "L'invito" (The Invitation). He published the three movements as Rossini Suite in 1935.

Two years later, in 1937, Britten reworked the music for a full orchestra and added two more movements based on Rossini: a "tirolese" (in the style of a Tyrolean peasant dance) called "La Pastorella dell'Alpi" (The Shepherdess of the Alps) from the Soirées musicales collection, and a tarantella, "La Charité" (Kindness), from Rossini's Trois choeurs religieux. The expanded suite, titled Soirées musicales, was premiered on 16 January 1937, by the BBC Orchestra conducted by Joseph Lewis.

In 1938 the dancer and choreographer Antony Tudor created a ballet called Soirée musicale (singular) using Britten's suite. It was presented at the London Palladium on 26 November, was given around the country, and, in 1939, on early television, and remained in the Ballet Rambert's repertoire into the 1960s.

In 1941 Lincoln Kirstein wanted a new ballet for a South American tour by the American Ballet. Britten composed another suite after Rossini called Matinées musicales, joined it to the Soirées musicales music and added the overture to La Cenerentola as a finale. The resulting ballet, choreographed by George Balanchine, was called Divertimento. In 1955 a new ballet, Soirée, by Zachary Solov was given at the Metropolitan Opera, New York, using the music of Britten's Soirées musicales.

== Music ==
=== Analysis ===
The suite, which plays for about eleven minutes, is in five movements:

1. March
  The lively opening march is based on the "Pas de soldats" from the third act of Rossini's William Tell. After an opening flourish, the movement begins quietly and crescendos to a fortissimo finish.
2. Canzonetta
  The second movement is in a gentle Italianate style with woodwind solos over undulating strings.
3. Tirolese
  A peasant song from the Tyrolean Alps, with a yodeling effect in the tune, first heard in the solo trumpet.
4. Bolero
  The Bolero, a sensuous Spanish dance, employs the expected castanets, supported by what the commentator William E Runyan calls "sparkling, luminous orchestration, with luxurious, cascading timbres".
5. Tarantella
  For the final movement, Britten takes an andante molto in 12/8 from a religious choral work and speeds the tune up to become a whirling Sicilian tarantella to bring the suite to an exuberant finish.

=== Scoring ===
The analyst Eric Roseberry writes of Britten's scoring:

These dashing and piquant adaptations from Rossini are in the spirit of all Britten's arrangements – there is no false reverence for a past style, no attempt to imitate Rossini's orchestral manner. Preserving only the tunes and original harmonies intact, the composer feels free to give rein to his own creative exuberence in exploiting the expanded wind and percussion resources of the twentieth-century orchestra, occasionally adding his own sly parodistic asides here and there.

The suite is scored for two flutes (second doubling piccolo), two oboes, two clarinets, two bassoons, two trumpets, two horns, three trombones, percussion (two players:glockenspiel, xylophone, cymbals, suspended cymbal, triangle, castanets, bass drum and side drum), harp and strings.

== Notes, references and sources ==
=== Sources ===
- Roseberry, Eric (2008). "The concertos and early orchestral scores". In Mervyn Cooke (ed.). Cambridge Companion to Benjamin Britten. Cambridge: Cambridge University Press. ISBN 978-0-52-157476-1.
- White, Eric W. (1983). Benjamin Britten: His Life and Operas. Berkeley: University of California Press. ISBN 978-0-52-004893-5.
