= Pizzica =

Italian tarantella folk dance

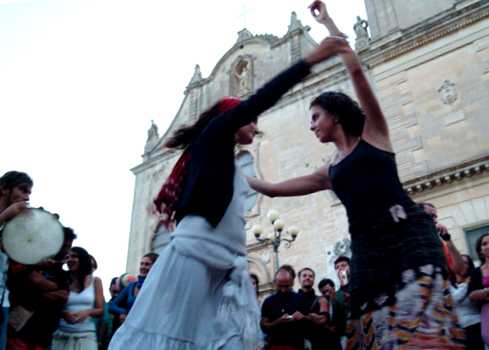
Dance of pizzica

Pizzica (Italian: [ˈpitt͡sika]) is a popular Italian folk dance, originally from the Salento peninsula, in Apulia, and later spreading throughout the rest of Apulia and the regions of Calabria and eastern Basilicata.

It is part of the larger family of tarantella.

== Dancing the pizzica ==
The traditional pizzica is a couple dance. The couple need not necessarily involve two individuals of opposite sexes, and often two women can be seen dancing together. Nowadays it has become rare to see two men dancing an entire pizzica. An exception with a pizzica between two men can still be found in the town of Ostuni, where one of the two men who dance jokingly pretends to be a woman. Another exception is where two men pretend to be engaged in a duel.

The most important book about pizzica and tarantism is The Land of Remorse, written by the Italian philosopher, anthropologist, and historian of religions Ernesto de Martino.

There are several traditional pizzica groups, the oldest being Officina Zoé, Uccio Aloisi gruppu, Canzoniere Grecanico Salentino, and I Tamburellisti di Torrepaduli.

Since 1998 there has been a summer Notte della Taranta ('Taranta Night'), consisting of a whole night where many famous musicians alternate their performances with pizzica orchestras. Some of them include Stewart Copeland, Franco Battiato, Gianna Nannini, Raiz, Lucio Dalla, and Carmen Consoli. The 11th Festival was held in Lecce in August 2008.

== Notable musicians and bands ==
- Alessandra Belloni
- Alla Bua
- Anna Cinzia Villani
- Antonio Castrignanò
- Arakne Mediterranea
- Canzoniere Grecanico Salentino
- Mascarimirì
- Ghetonìa
- Officina Zoè
- Enza Pagliara

== Notable dancer ==
- ALI Alice Andrea Demarco
