= Matinées musicales =

1941 composition by Benjamin Britten

- by Benjamin Britten
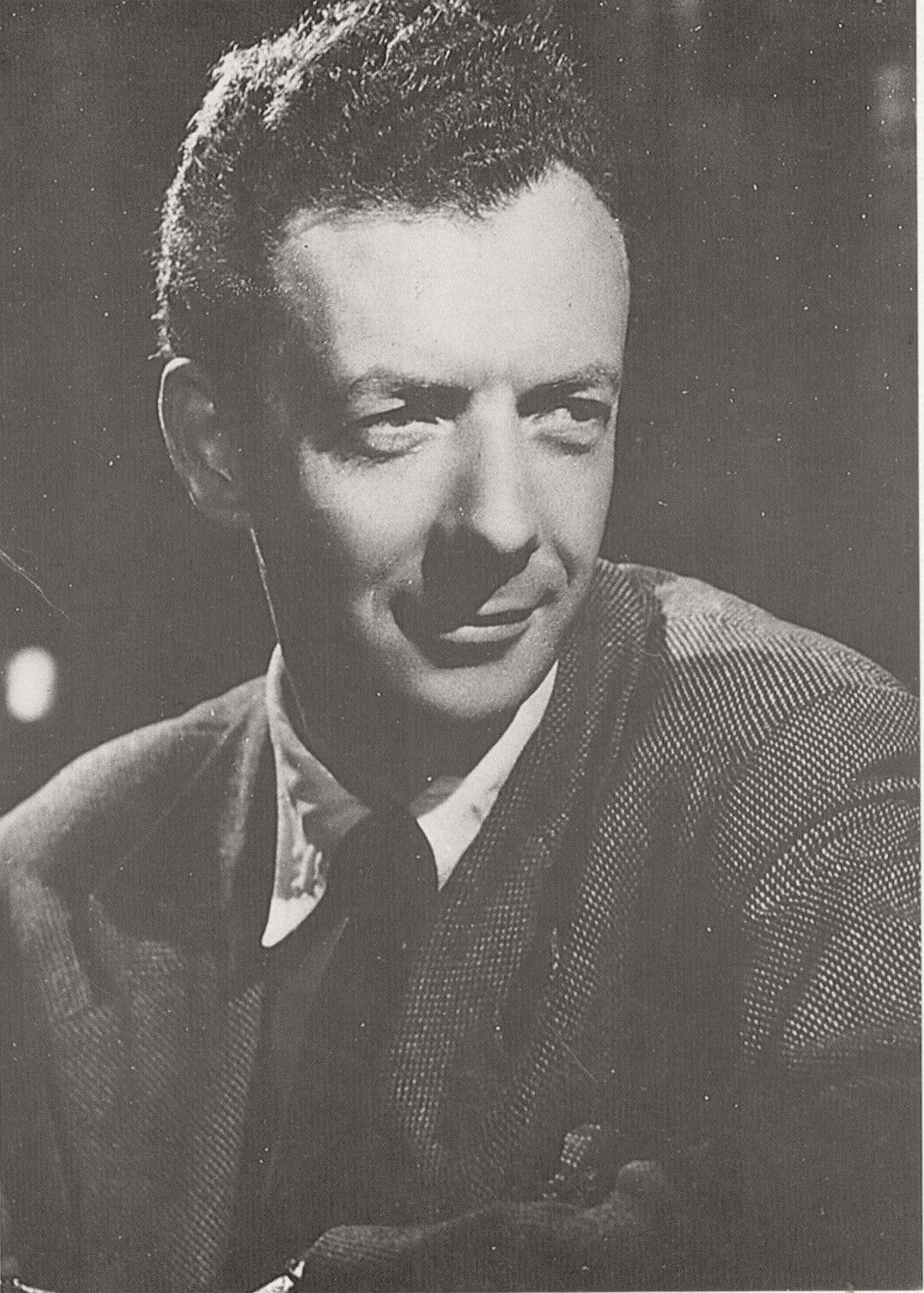
- Benjamin Britten in the 1940s
- Form: suite
- Composed: June 1941
- Performed: 27 June 1941

Matinées musicales is a 1941 composition by Benjamin Britten using music composed by Gioachino Rossini in and around the 1830s. The suite is a successor to Britten's earlier suite based on Rossini, Soirées musicales (1937).

== History ==
In 1935 Benjamin Britten had composed the music for a five-minute short film by Lotte Reininger, called The Tocher. Using themes from works by Rossini composed a little over a century earlier, Britten wrote a score for boys' voices, woodwind, piano and percussion. He later reworked the music for a full orchestra and added two more movements based on Rossini. The expanded suite, titled Soirées musicales, was premiered in 1937 and was used by the choreographer Antony Tudor for a new ballet, Soirée musicale, the following year.

In 1941 Lincoln Kirstein wanted a new ballet for a South American tour by the American Ballet. Britten composed another suite after Rossini called Matinées musicales, joined it to the Soirées musicales music and added the overture to La Cenerentola as a finale. The resulting ballet, choreographed by George Balanchine, was called Divertimento. The premiere of Soirées musicales had taken place close to home (London); the first performance of the music of Matinées musicales took place on 27 June 1941 in the Theatro Municipal (Rio de Janeiro), under the ballet orchestra's conductor, Emanuel Balaban.

== Music ==
The music is inspired by compositions of Gioachino Rossini in the same way the Soirées were. And again there are five sections:

1. March (from William Tell, act 1, "Pas de six")
2. Nocturne (from Rossini's Soirées Musicales, nr. 10 "La pesca")
3. Waltz (from Rossini's Soirées Musicales, nr. 4 "L'orgia")
4. Pantomime (from Rossini's Soirées Musicales, nr. 2 "Il rimprovero")
5. Moto perpetuo (Gorgheggi e solfeggi)

=== Orchestration ===
- 2 flutes and 1 piccolo, 2 oboes, 2 clarinets, 2 bassoons
- 4 horns (of which 2 ad lib), 2 trumpets, 2 trombones, 1 bass trombone or tuba
- timpani, 2 percussionists (for a snare drum, tenor drum, bass drum, woodblock, triangle, suspended cymbal, tambourine), 1 harp or piano, 1 celesta or piano
- violins, violas, cellos, double basses

== References and sources ==
=== Sources ===
- Roseberry, Eric (2008). "The concertos and early orchestral scores". In Mervyn Cooke (ed.). Cambridge Companion to Benjamin Britten. Cambridge: Cambridge University Press. ISBN 978-0-52-157476-1.
- White, Eric W. (1983). Benjamin Britten: His Life and Operas. Berkeley: University of California Press. ISBN 978-0-52-004893-5.
