= Soirées musicales (Rossini) =

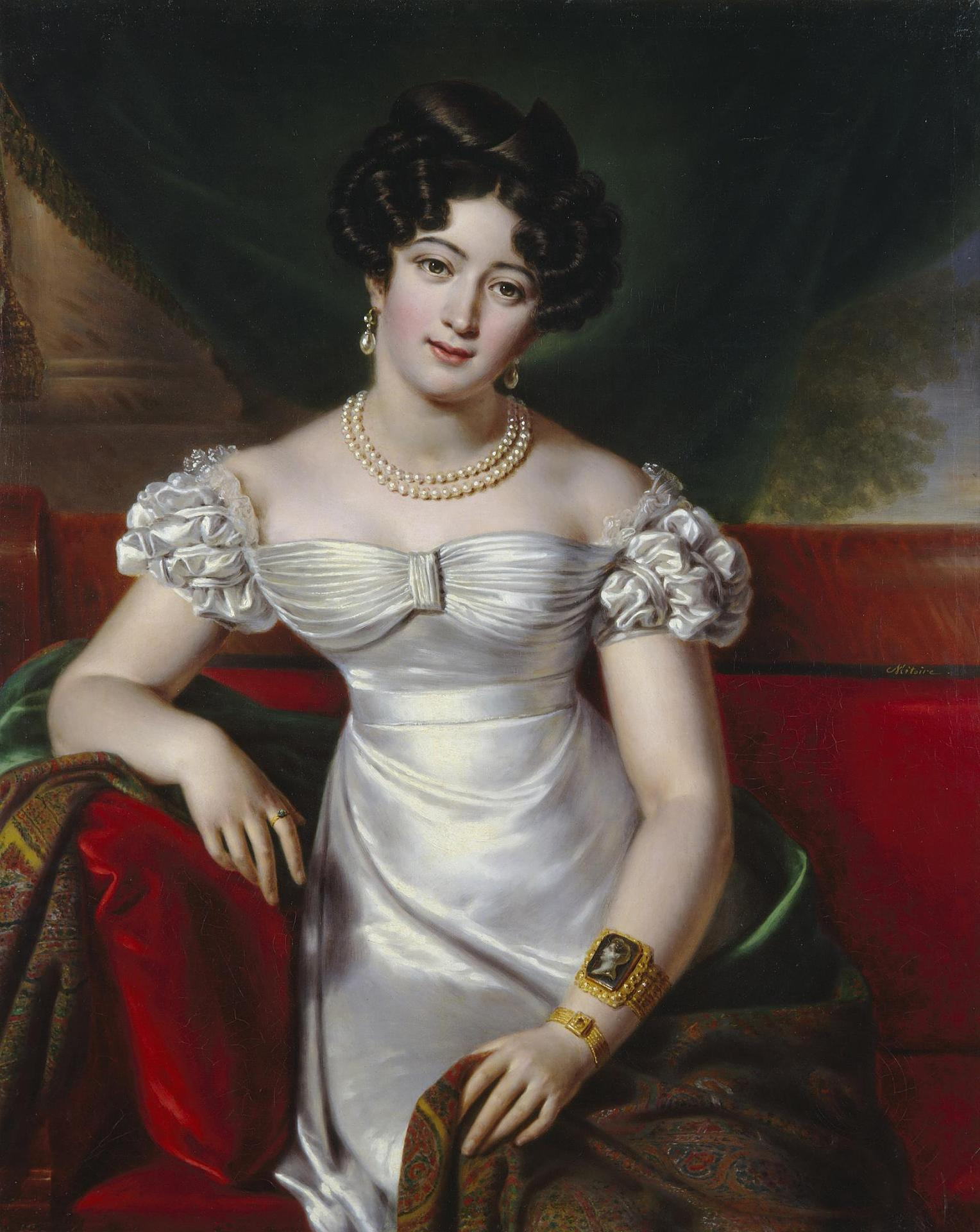
The dedicatee Countess Yuliya Samoyloff (1803–75)

Les soirées musicales is a collection of eight songs and four duets by Rossini published by Eugène-Théodore Troupenas in 1835. Richard Osborne comments that "It is more an 'Album de Musique' than a song cycle." The collection was dedicated to "Madame la Comtesse Julie Samoyloff, née Comtesse de Phalen". i.e. Yulya Samoyloff (1803-1875).

== Published order ==
8 Ariettas: generally sung by soprano or mezzo, but can be sung by tenor.

1. La promessa (The promise – a canzonetta) "Ch'io mai vi possa lasciar d'amare"
2. Il rimprovero (The reproach – a canzonetta) "Mi lagnerò tacendo"
3. La partenza (The departure – a canzonetta) "Ecco quel fiero istante!"
4. L'orgia (The orgy – an arietta) "Amiamo, cantiamo"
5. L'invito (The invitation – a bolero (Spanish dance)) "Vieni, o Ruggiero"
6. La pastorella dell'Alpi (The Alpine shepherdess – a tirolese) "Son bella pastorella"
7. La gita in gondola (The trip in a gondola – a barcarola) "Voli l'agile barchetta"
8. La danza (The dance – a tarantella napoletana) "Già la luna è in mezzo al mare"

4 Duets:

9. La regata veneziana (The Venetian regatta – a notturno) "Voga, o Tonio benedeto" (duet for two sopranos)
10. La pesca (The fish – notturno) "Già la notte s'avvicina" (duet for two sopranos)
11. La serenata (duet) (The serenade – notturno) "Mira la bianca luna" (duet for soprano and tenor)
12. Li marinari (The sailors – duetto) "Marinaro in guardia stà" (duet for tenor and bass)

== Liszt versions ==
Liszt recomposed the pieces for solo piano as Soirees Musicales (Rossini-Liszt) S424

1. La promessa – Canzonetta
2. La regata veneziana – Notturno
3. L'invito – Bolero
4. La gita in gondola – Barcarola
5. Il rimprovero – Canzonetta
6. La pastorella dell' Alpi – Tirolese
7. La partenza – Canzonetta
8. La pesca – Notturno
9. La danza – Tarantella
10. La serenata – Notturno
11. L'orgia – Arietta
12. Li marinari – Duetto

== Britten versions ==
Britten adapted some of the pieces in his Soirées musicales (Britten) Op.9.
