= La regata veneziana =

Duet for two sopranos by Gioachino Rossini

La regata veneziana (The Venetian Regatta) is the title of two different compositions by Gioachino Rossini. A duet with that title ("Voga, o Tonio benedeto") is catalogued as Les soirées musicales, No. 9 and a set of three canonzettas with that title is catalogued in his Péchés de vieillesse in Volume 1 Album italiano as Nos. 8-10.
