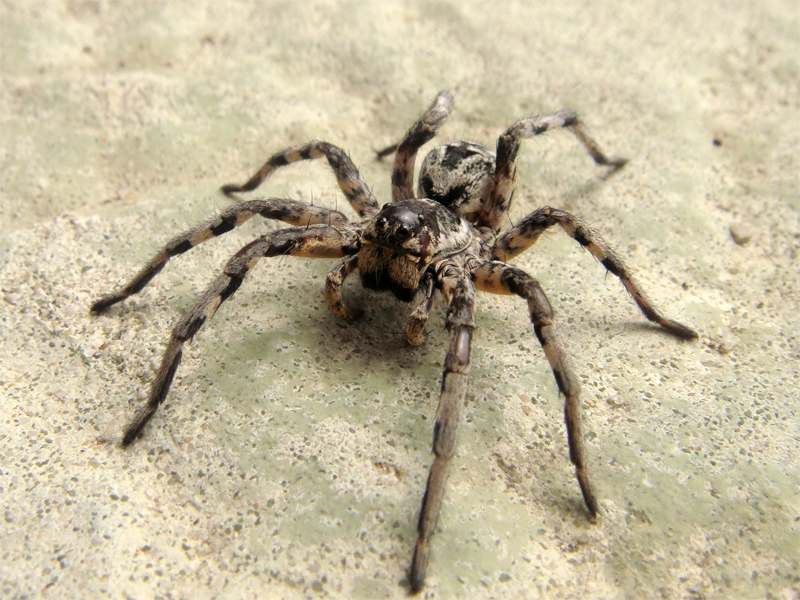

Scientific classification
- Kingdom: Animalia
- Phylum: Arthropoda
- Subphylum: Chelicerata
- Class: Arachnida
- Order: Araneae
- Infraorder: Araneomorphae
- Family: Lycosidae
- Genus: Lycosa
- Species: L. tarantula

Binomial name
- Lycosa tarantula (Linnaeus, 1758)

Synonyms
- Aranea tarantula Linnaeus, 1758; Lycosa tarantula (Linnaeus, 1758); Lycosa tarentula narbonensis Walckenaer, 1806; Lycosa melanogaster Latreille, 1817; Lycosa narbonensis Walckenaer, 1837; Lycosa rubiginosa C. L. Koch, 1838; Tarentula apuliae C. L. Koch, 1850; Tarentula rubiginosa (C. L. Koch, 1838); Tarentula melanogaster (Latreille, 1817); Tarentula fasciiventris Thorell, 1873; Tarentula narbonensis (Walckenaer, 1837)

= Lycosa tarantula =

Species of arachnid

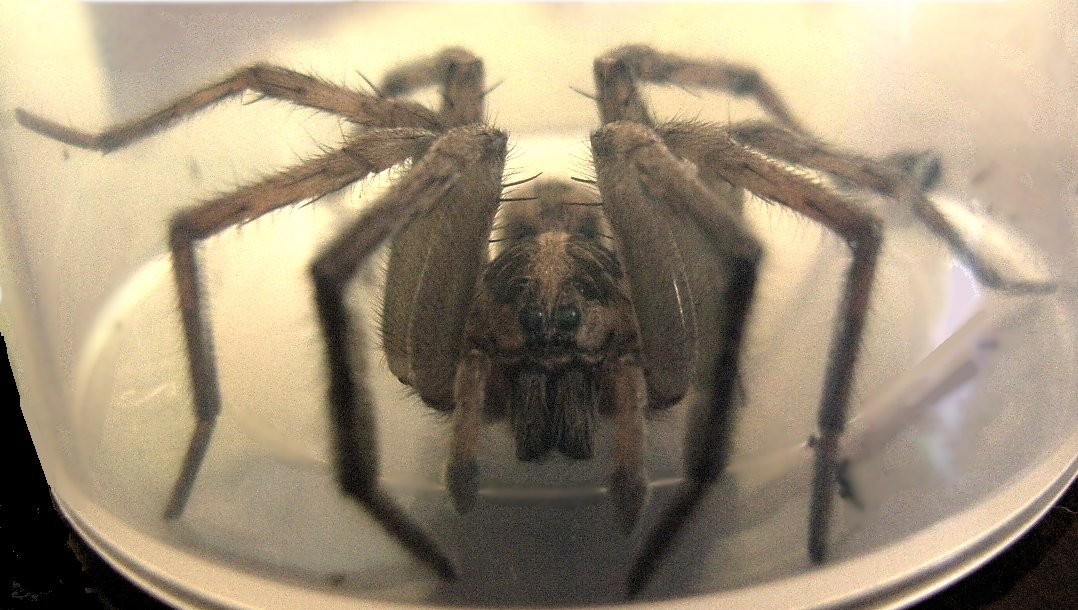
Frontal view of Lycosa tarantula

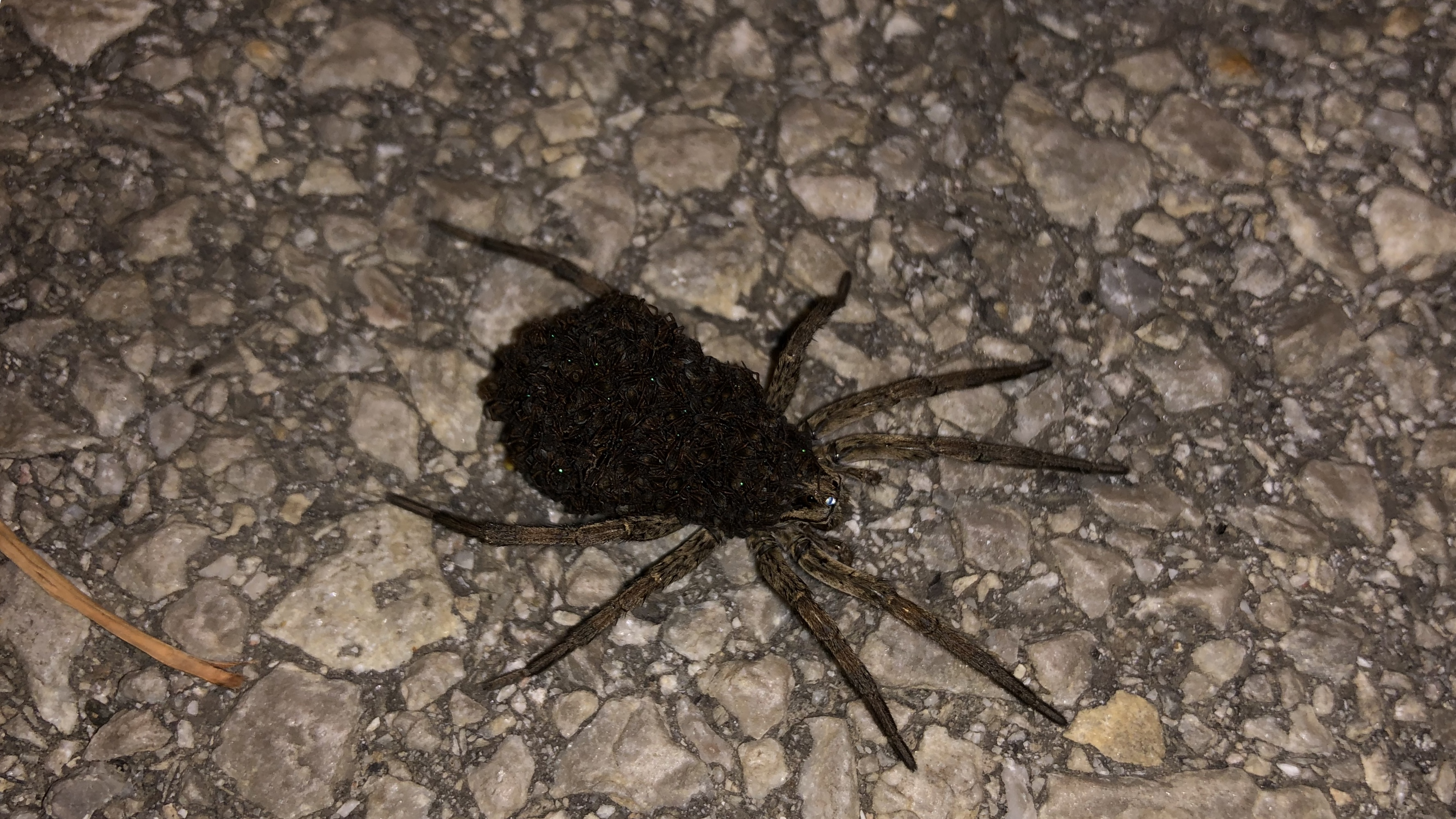
Mother with young on her back

Lycosa tarantula is the species originally known as the tarantula, a name that nowadays in English commonly refers to spiders in another family entirely, the Theraphosidae. It now may be better called the tarantula wolf spider, being in the wolf spider family, the Lycosidae. L. tarantula is a large species found in southern Europe, especially in the Apulia region of Italy and near the city of Taranto, from which it gets its name.

Historical superstition has it that the spider's bite can produce severe symptoms called tarantism.

== Description ==
These spiders are rather large, the females being as large as 30 mm (1 3/16 inches) in body length and the males around 19 mm (3/4 inch). As with other wolf spiders, the silken sac containing over 100 eggs is carried attached to the mother's spinnerets, and then after they hatch, the spiderlings climb on their mother's abdomen and ride around with her for some time until they are sufficiently mature to survive on their own. After leaving their mother's protection, the young spiders disperse and dig burrows. Females live in their burrows all their lives except for nocturnal forays to capture prey, but the mature males leave the protection of burrows and wander about looking for mates. The males can live for 2 years. The females can live for 4 years or more. Many sexual encounters (about one-third according to one study) end in the females cannibalizing the male instead. During the winter, these spiders hibernate in their burrows.

They are a nocturnal species and generally lurk at the mouths of their burrows waiting for prey, so people are unlikely to encounter them. Unlike the Salticidae (jumping spiders), which may exhibit curiosity about humans and may be content to wander around on one's hand, the Lycosidae (wolf spiders) have a very strong tendency to flee at the approach of any large animal. They have quite good eyesight, so a human is unlikely to approach them unseen. Capturing them is relatively difficult, because they keep moving and can run very fast. When wolf spiders are cornered, they show no inclination to make threat displays, much less to advance on a human's hand with the intention of biting.

== Taxonomy ==
The species was first described by Carl Linnaeus in 1758 (as Aranea tarantula). It was transferred to the genus Lycosa by Pierre André Latreille in 1806. Charles Athanase Walckenaer in the same 1806 publication described the subspecies narbonensis, which in 1837 he raised to a full species as Lycosa narbonensis. A molecular phylogenetic study in 2013 showed that specimens assigned to this taxon were not genetically different from Lycosa tarantula, so that L. narbonensis is now treated as synonym of L. tarantula.

== Tarantism ==
A once-traditional belief among Apulian peasantry is that a person bitten by one of these spiders must be treated by indulging in a special kind of dancing. The dance, or some version of it, is now known as the tarantella. However, the bites of this spider are not known to cause severe symptoms in humans, much less endanger human life.

== Venom ==
The venom of the Lycosa tarantula is not known to be harmful to people, this can also be said for the entire Lycosidae family since it is not one of the families recognized as posing a serious health risk to people. However, L. tarantula has been observed to be harmful to some small vertebrates, so careful handling is important with this species. A broad study of the genus Lycosa found that injecting venom from different spiders in this genus typically only resulted in swelling in guinea pigs that did not last more than 7 days, scabbing in pigs that cleared up in about a week, and slight hemolysis when tested on human red blood cells.

L. tarantula venom is composed mostly of neurotoxins and venom proteins. Their venom shares similarities to other Lycosa spiders, as well as the American Wandering spider, though they are not of the Lycosidae family. While the venom complexity is similar, there are differences in the mass of certain ions and proteins found in male and female venom. When compared to males, over half of these measurements are unique only to the females of the species.

== Subspecies ==
- L. t. carsica Caporiacco, 1949 — Italy
- L. t. cisalpina Simon, 1937 — France

== Sources ==
- Foelix, Rainer F. (2010). Biology of spiders (3 ed.). New York: Oxford University Press. ISBN 978-0-19-973482-5.
