= La Danza =

Patter song by Gioachino Rossini

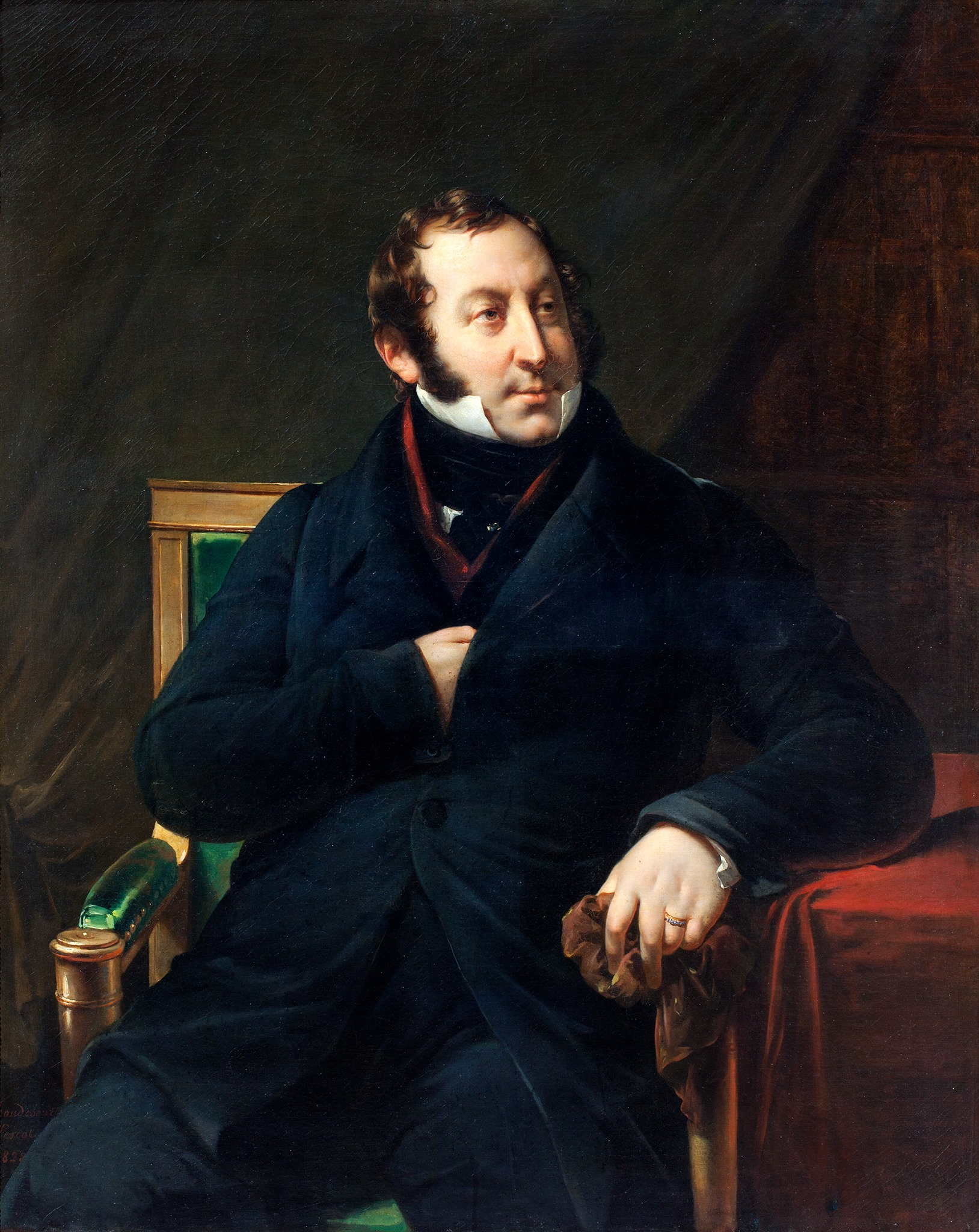
Gioachino Rossini, painted in Paris in 1828 by Hortense Haudebourt-Lescot

"La danza" (Dance) (1835) is a patter song by Gioachino Rossini, in Tarantella napoletana time, the eighth song of the collection Les soirées musicales (1830–1835). The lyrics are by Count Carlo Pepoli (it), librettist of Vincenzo Bellini's opera I puritani. "La danza" is a stand-alone chamber vocal piece, rather than part of a larger work.

Franz Liszt transcribed it for piano, and so did Charles-Valentin Alkan (in his 12 Études in All the Minor Keys); Frédéric Chopin used the song as inspiration for his Tarantelle in A-flat, Op. 43; and Ottorino Respighi featured it in La Boutique fantasque. "La danza" was loosely the original source of the popular wedding tarantella "C'è la luna mezzo mare" and its English versions "Oh! Ma-Ma!" and "Lazy Mary".

== Lyrics ==
"La Danza"
sung by Enrico Caruso in 1912

"La Danza" (instrumental)
Performed by the Strolling Strings of the United States Air Force Band

|: Già la luna è in mezzo al mare,
mamma mia, si salterà!
L’ora è bella per danzare,
chi è in amor non mancherà. :|
Già la luna è in mezzo al mare,
mamma mia, si salterà!

Presto in danza a tondo, a tondo,
donne mie venite qua,
un garzon bello e giocondo
a ciascuna toccherà,
finchè in ciel brilla una stella
e la luna splenderà.
Il più bel con la più bella
tutta notte danzerà.

Mamma mia, mamma mia,
già la luna è in mezzo al mare,
mamma mia, mamma mia,
mamma mia, si salterà.
|: Frinche, frinche, frinche,
frinche, frinche, frinche,
mamma mia, si salterà. :|

La la ra la ra
la ra la la ra la
(repeated twice)
la la ra la ra
la la la la ra la!

|: Salta, salta, gira, gira,
ogni coppia a cerchio va,
già s’avanza, si ritira
e all’assalto tornerà. :|
Già s’avanza, si ritira
e all’assalto tornerà!

Serra, serra, colla bionda,
colla bruna và quà e là
colla rossa và a seconda,
colla smorta fermo sta.
Viva il ballo a tondo a tondo,
sono un Re, sono un Pascià,
è il più bel piacer del mondo
la più cara voluttà.

Mamma mia, mamma mia,
già la luna è in mezzo al mare,
mamma mia, mamma mia,
mamma mia, si salterà.
|: Frinche, frinche, frinche,
frinche, frinche, frinche,
mamma mia, si salterà. :|

La la ra la ra
la ra la la ra la
(repeated twice)
la la ra la ra
la la la la ra la!

|: Now the moon is over the ocean;
Mamma mia, we're going to leap!
The hour is beautiful for dancing,
Anyone in love will not miss it. :|
Now the moon is over the ocean;
Mamma mia, we're going to leap!

Soon we’ll be dancing, round and round,
my ladies, come here,
A beautiful and playful lad
will have a turn with everyone.
As long as in heaven sparkles a star,
And the moonbeams will shine
The most beautiful boy and girl
will dance all night.

Mamma mia, Mamma mia,
Now the moon is over the ocean;
Mamma mia, mamma mia,
Mamma mia, we're going to leap!
|: Faster, faster, faster,
faster, faster, faster,
Mamma mia, we're going to leap! :|

La la ra la ra
la ra la la ra la
(repeated twice)
la la ra la ra
la la la la ra la!

|: Hopping, jumping, turning, spinning,
every couple have a turn,
now advancing, now receding,
and returns to the excitement. :|
Now advancing, now receding,
and returns to the excitement.

Keep close, keep close with the blonde,
with the brunette go here and there,
with the redhead follow along.
with the pale one, keep still.
Long live dancing, round and round!
I am a king, I am a lord,
It is the world’s greatest pleasure
The most beautiful delight!

Mamma mia, mamma mia,
now the moon is over the ocean;
Mamma mia, Mamma mia,
Mamma mia, we're going to leap!
|: Faster, faster, faster,
faster, faster, faster,
Mamma mia, we're going to leap! :|

La la ra la ra
la ra la la ra la
(repeated twice)
la la ra la ra
la la la la ra la!
