= Tarantelle (Chopin) =

Short piano piece by Chopin

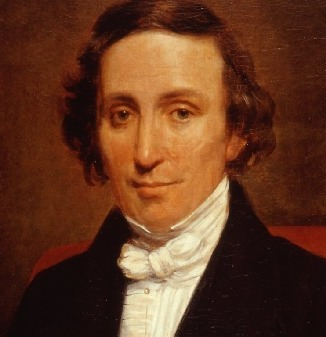
Chopin in 1840 by Henri Lehmann

Tarantelle in A-flat major, Op. 43
Performed by Olga Gurevich

The Tarantella in A-flat major, Op. 43 is a short piano piece in tarantella form written by Frédéric Chopin in June 1841 and published in October 1841. It takes about 3 minutes to play.

It is a moto perpetuo marked Presto, and requires an advanced technique. It was inspired by Gioachino Rossini's song La danza, also written in the tarantella's characteristic 6/8 rhythm. Chopin went to some lengths to ensure the time signature was the same as Rossini's, and he enlisted his friend Julian Fontana to check the best editions of Rossini's work for this detail. The manuscript shows Chopin changed his time signature from 12/8 to 6/8. There is no evidence the work was commissioned, nor was it dedicated to anyone.

Robert Schumann described it as being in "Chopin's most extravagant manner; we see before us the dancer, whirling as if possessed, until our senses reel. To be sure, nobody could call this music lovely, but we willingly forgive the master his wild fantasy. For is he not once in a while permitted to display the dark side of his soul?"

Chopin himself said, "I hope I won't write anything as dreadful too soon". Despite this self-criticism, it has become a recording favourite, although it is less frequently performed in recital.
