= Tarantella Napoletana =

Song from the opera La festa di Piedigrotta, composed by Luigi Ricci (1852)

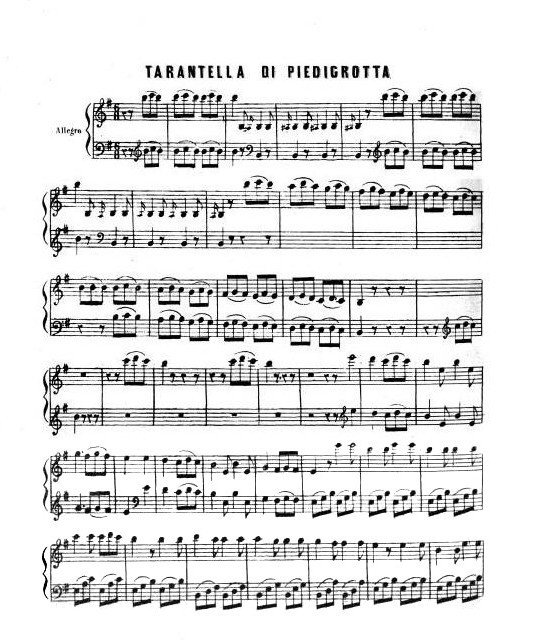
- First page of the sheet music of Tarantella Napoletana, published in 1859

Song
- Written: 1852
- Published: 1852
- Genre: Tarantella
- Composer: Luigi Ricci

The "Tarantella Napoletana", originally named "Tarantella di Piedigrotta", also known as the "Italian riff", is a tarantella song that concludes the 1852 comic opera La festa di Piedigrotta by Luigi Ricci. It is familiar to North Americans as a quintessentially Italian musical riff or melody. It is written in the Neapolitan language, and is named after a former music festival in the Piedigrotta area of the city of Naples, Italy.

== Lyrics ==
The song's original lyrics are in the Neapolitan language. The scene of the opera La festa di Piedigrotta in which the song appears is scene one of act three, which takes place in Pozzuoli, on the road to Piedigrotta. Lena and Manicotto (two of the main characters) dance the Neapolitan tarantella, and the townsfolk join in, lit by moonlight and accompanied by castanets and tambourines.

Full-length orchestral performance
by La voce del padrone

Page one of the original lyrics from La festa di Piedigrotta, featuring the scene introduction and first two lines (beginning at atto terzo, "third act" in Neapolitan)

Page two of the original lyrics

Tarantella di Piedigrotta
Viene ccà; non fa cchiù Zeza;
Te remolla, Carmenè;
Vide, vi, sì fatta meza,
Né saje dirme lo pecchè.

Io purzì mme vedo e sento
Mpilo mpilo ndebolì;
Mme so fatto no peliento,
Né la causa saccio dì.

Da chell'ora ch'a la festa
Nce ncontràjemo, Carmenè,
Tengo mpietto na tempesta,
Comme tu ll'aje mpietto a te.

Quanno sto da te lontano
Io mme sento ascevolì:
Tu faje segno co la mano,
C'a te pure fa accossì.

Viene mo; co sta resella
Tu no mmito vuoje da me:
A ballà la tarantella
Fatte annanza, azzecca, azzè.

No carofano scarlato
Tengo schiuso, Carmenè;
A nisciuno ll'aggio dato
Pe stiparlo schitto a te.

Vì lo core che te dice:
Dì, lo vuoje, o no lo vuò?
Si lo cirche, si felice;
Io lo coglio, e te lo do.

Tu purzì tiene na cosa,
Carmenè, che fa pe mme;
È na bella e fresca rosa,
Che cchiù cara no non c'è!

Pe no poco, no momento
Dalla a me, sperenno io sto:
Famme sì, famme contento,
36 Carmenè, dammella mo.

De sti sciure no mazzetto
Voglio farne, mena me':
Po a ballà no minuetto
Vienetenne, Carmenè.

== See also ==
- Arabian riff, "The Streets of Cairo", "The Poor Little Country Maid", "the snake charmer song"
- "Funiculì, Funiculà", another Italian song often used in media as a leitmotif to represent Italy
- Jarabe Tapatío, the "Mexican hat dance"
- Oriental riff, stereotypical pentatonic riff
