= Tarantism =

Dancing mania from southern Italy

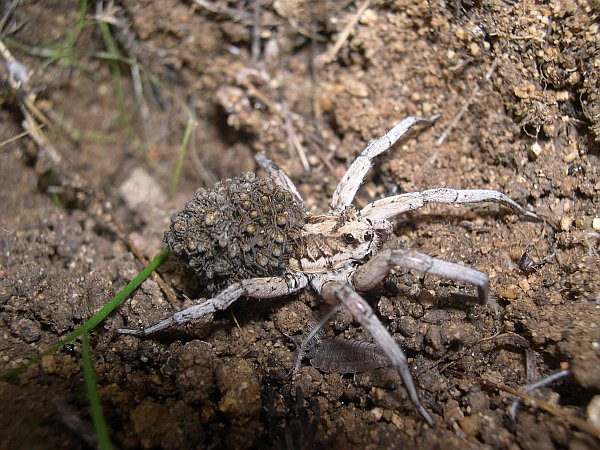
Lycosa tarantula carrying her offspring

Tarantism (/ˈtɛrənˌtɪzəm/ TERR-ən-tiz-əm) is a form of hysteric behaviour originating in Southern Italy, popularly believed to result from the bite of the wolf spider Lycosa tarantula (distinct from the broad class of spiders also called tarantulas). A better candidate cause is Latrodectus tredecimguttatus, commonly known as the Mediterranean black widow or steppe spider, although no link between such bites and the behaviour of tarantism has ever been demonstrated. However, the term historically is used to refer to a dancing mania – characteristic of Southern Italy – which likely had little to do with spider bites. The tarantella dance supposedly evolved from a therapy for tarantism.

== History ==
It was originally described in the 11th century. The condition was common in Southern Italy, especially in the province of Taranto, during the 16th and 17th centuries. There were strong suggestions that there is no organic cause for the heightened excitability and restlessness that gripped the victims. The stated belief of the time was that victims needed to engage in frenzied dancing to prevent death from tarantism. Supposedly a particular kind of dance, called the tarantella, evolved from this therapy. A prime location for such outbursts was the church at Galatina, particularly at the time of the Feast of Saints Peter and Paul on 29 June. "The dancing is placed under the sign of Saint Paul, whose chapel serves as a "theatre" for the tarantulees' public meetings. The spider seems constantly interchangeable with Saint Paul; the female tarantulees dress as "brides of Saint Paul". As a climax, "the tarantulees, after having danced for a long time, meet together in the chapel of Saint Paul and communally attain the paroxysm of their trance, ... the general and desperate agitation was dominated by the stylised cry of the tarantulees, the 'crisis cry', an ahiii uttered with various modulations".

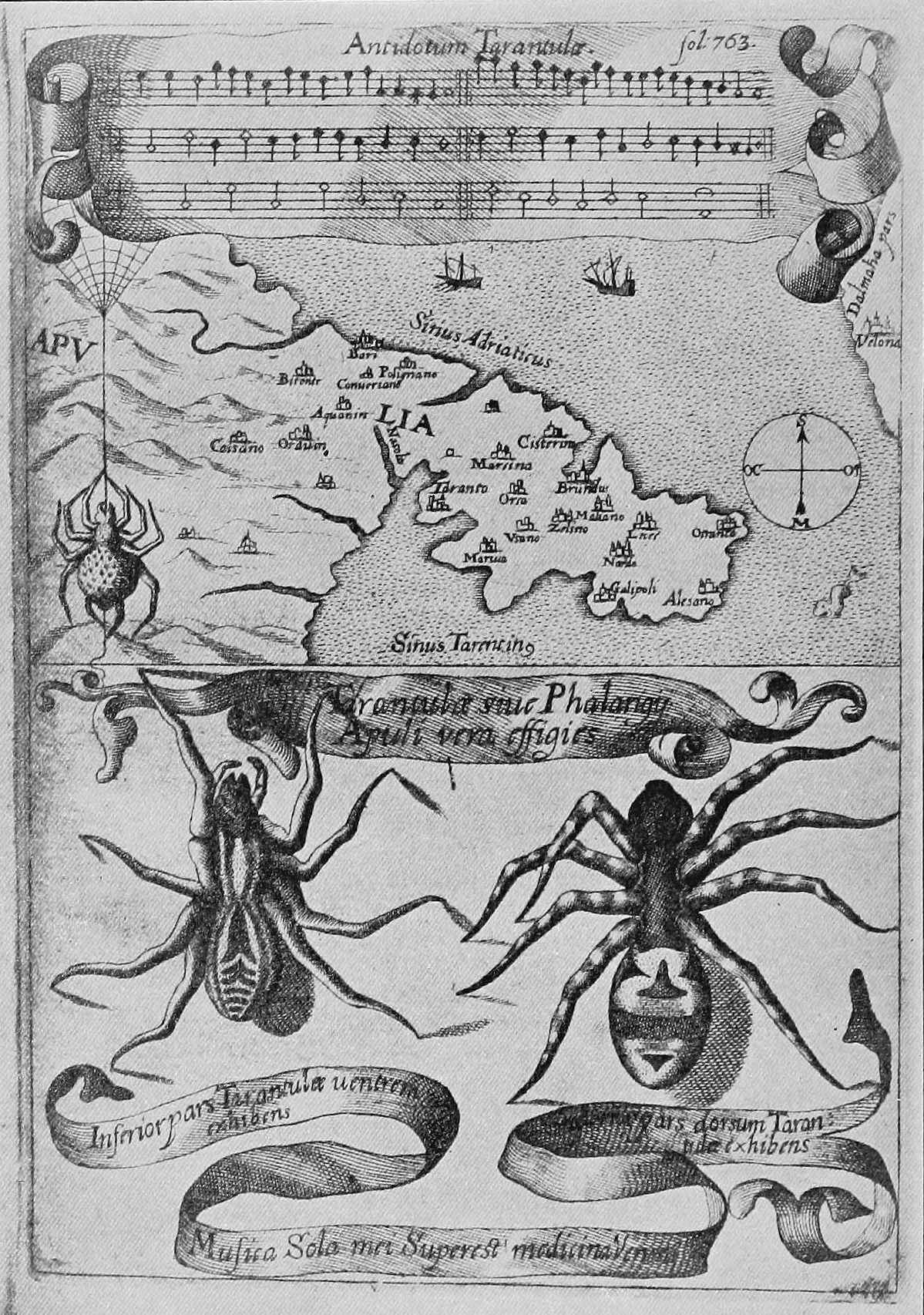
Antidotum tarantulae, a curative musical score from Athanasius Kircher (c. 1660)

Francesco Cancellieri, in his exhaustive treatise on Tarantism, takes note of semi-scientific, literary, and popular observations, both recent and ancient, giving each similar weight. He notes a report that in August 1693, a doctor in Naples had himself been bitten by two tarantulas, with six witnesses and a notary, but did not suffer the dancing illness. Cancellieri in part attributes this illness not only to the spiders but to the locale, since Tarantism was mainly seen in Basilicata, Apulia, Sicily, and Calabria. He states:

Quando uno è punto da questa mal augurata bestia, si fanno cento diverse mosse in un momento. Si piange, si balla, si vomita, si trema, si ride, s'impallidisce, si grida, si sviene, si soffre gran dolore, e finalmente dopo qualche giorno si muore, se uno non è soccorso. Il sudore, e gli antidoti sollevano l'ammalato; ma il sovrano, ed unico rimedio è la Musica.

When one is in the hold of this ill-wished beast, one has a hundred different feelings at a time. One cries, dances, vomits, trembles, laughs, pales, cries, faints, and one will suffer great pain, and finally after a few days, if unaided, you die. Sweat and antidotes relieve the sick, but the sovereign and the only remedy is Music.

He goes on to describe some specific observations of the malady, typically afflicting peasants, alone or in groups. The malady typically affected peasants on hot summer days, causing indolence. Then he describes how only treatment through dancing music could restore them to vitality; for example:

[...] e trovammo il misero contadino oppresso da difficile respirazione, ed osservammo inoltre, che la faccia, e le mani erano incominciate a divenir nere. E perchè il suo male era a tutti noto, si portò la Chitarra, la cui armonìa subito, che da lui fu intesa, cominciò a mover prima li piedi, poco dipoi le gambe. Si reggeva appresso sulle ginocchia. Indi a poco intervallo s'alzò passenggiando. Finalmente fra lo spazio di un quarto d'ora saltava si, che si sollevava ben tre palmi da terra. Sospirava, ma con empito sì grande, che portava terrore a' circostanti; e prima d'un'ora se gli tolse il nero dalle mani, e dal viso, riacquistando il suo natio colore.

[...] and we found the poor peasant oppressed with difficult breathing, and we observed also that the face and hands had started to become black. And 'cause his illness was known to all, a guitar was brought, whose harmony immediately that he was understood, began first moving the feet, legs shortly afterwards. He stood on his knees. Soon after an interval he arose swaying. Finally, in the space of a quarter of an hour he was leaping, nearly three palms from the ground. Sighed, but with such great impetus, that it terrorised bystanders, and before an hour, the black was gone from his hands and face, and he regained his native colour.

== Interpretation and controversy ==
John Crompton proposed that ancient Bacchanalian rites that had been suppressed by the Roman Senate in 186 BC went underground, reappearing under the guise of emergency therapy for bite victims. Although the popular belief persists that tarantism results from a spider bite, it remains scientifically unsubstantiated. Donaldson, Cavanagh, and Rankin (1997) conclude that the actual cause or causes of tarantism remain unknown.

== Modern times ==
In recent years, tarantism has been defined by its connection to dance and music. In the 1990s and 2000s, people began rediscovering the genre of Tarantella, and in particular, the pizzica. In 1998, Salento began hosting an annual music festival, Notte della Taranta. Musicians tour throughout the region, and the festival culminates with a large late-night concert held in Melpignano. Composer and musician, Ludovico Einaudi directed the festival in 2010 and 2011, and released his album Taranta Project in 2015.

== Cultural references ==
Many historical and cultural references are associated with this disease and the ensuing "cure" – the tarantella. It is, for example, a key image in Henrik Ibsen's A Doll's House and the spell "Tarantallegra" from the Harry Potter series. It was also mentioned in the novel 39 Clues: Superspecial Outbreak. The mention of the spider "tarantula" and description of its venom and the associated addiction has been depicted in the Indian television show "Byomkesh Bakshi" in episode 4 titled "Makdi ka Ras/makorshar rawsh".

== See also ==
- Dancing mania
- Ergotism
- Spider bite
