= Tarantella =

Italian folk dance

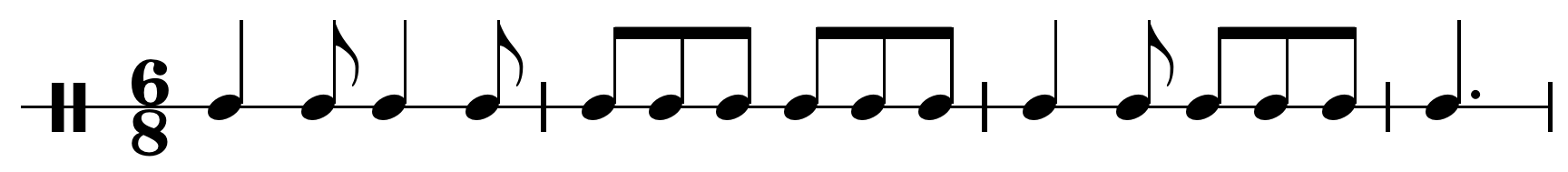
Tarantella rhythm

Tarantella (Italian: [taranˈtɛlla]) is a group of various southern Italian folk dances originating in the regions of Calabria, Campania, Sicilia, and Apulia. It is characterized by a fast upbeat tempo, usually in 6/8 time (sometimes 12/8 or 4/4), accompanied by tambourines. It is among the most recognized forms of traditional southern Italian music. The specific dance-name varies with every region, for instance sonu a ballu in Calabria, tammurriata in Campania, and pizzica in Salento. Tarantella is popular in southern Italy, Greece, and Malta. The term may appear as tarantello in a linguistically masculine construction.

== History ==
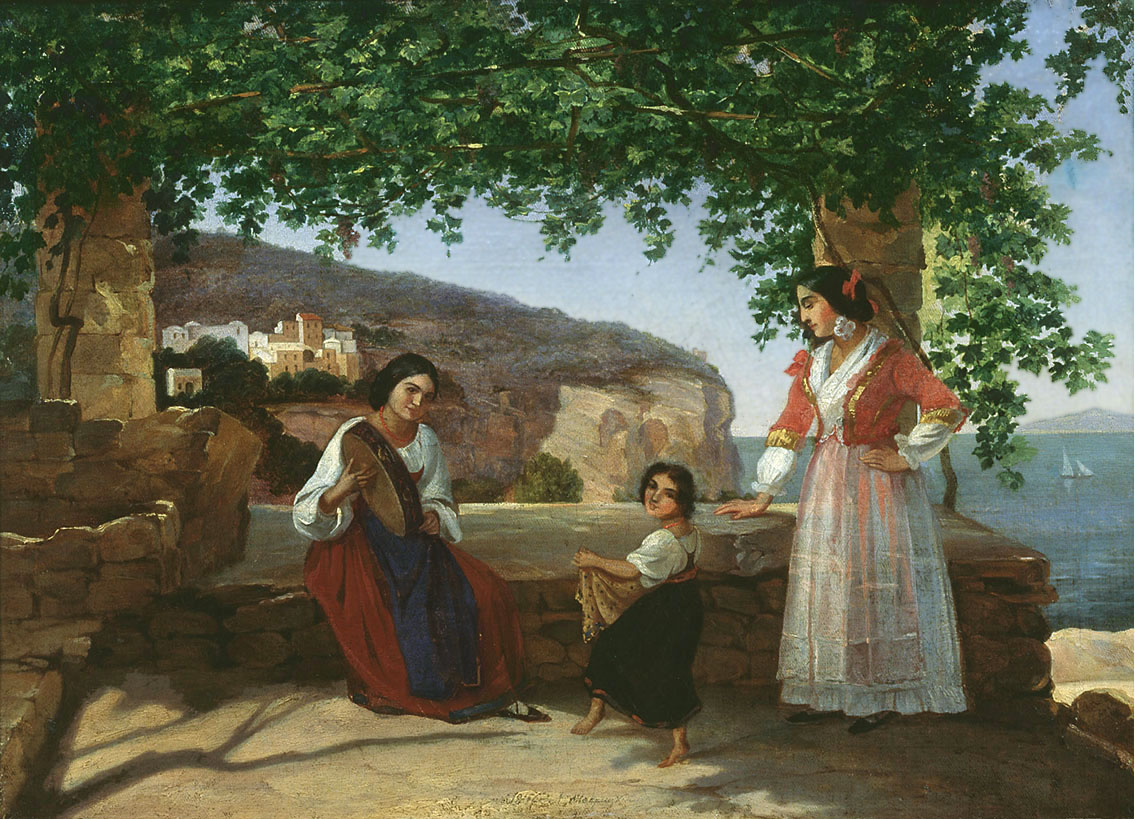
Italian girl dancing the tarantella, 1846

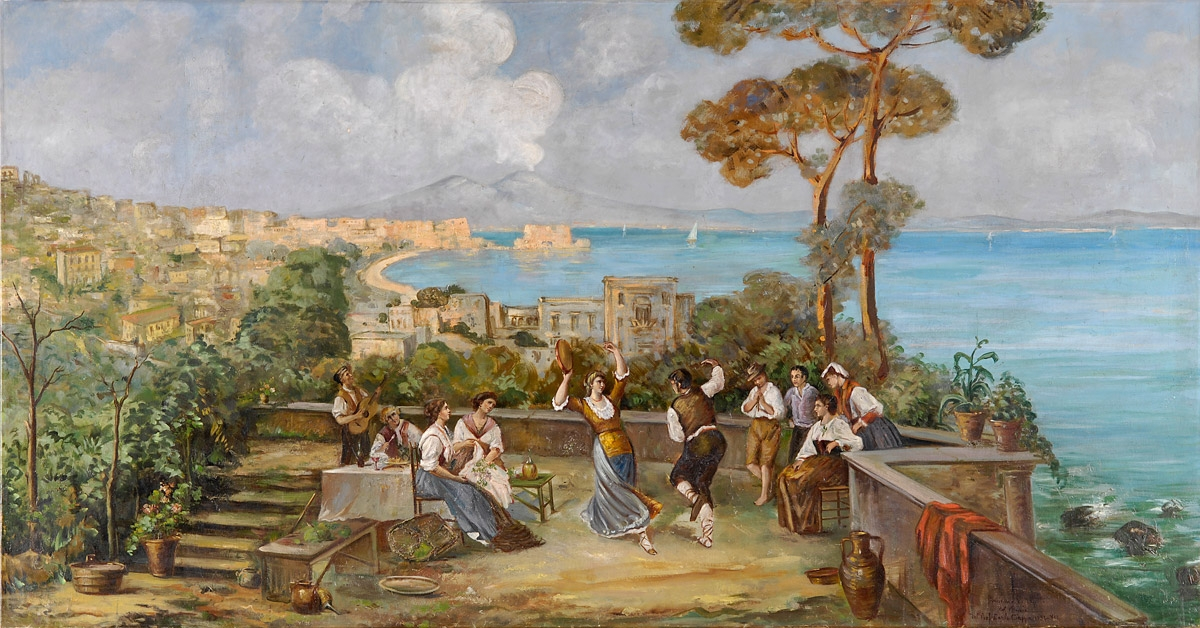
Italians in Naples dancing the tarantella

The present southern part of Italy was not part of a single country until the mid to late 19th century. The place was a colony of ancient Greece, and even Napoli comes from the Greek word Neapolis, which means 'New City'. Before the unification of Italy, it was part of the Kingdom of Naples and the Kingdom of Sicily ("Sikelia" is the original name of this island as a colony of Ancient Greece), and later the Kingdom of Two Sicilies when the two reigns merged. Before the unification of Italy, it was ruled by Spain and briefly by Austria. There was the ancient Greek city of Tarantas found by Spartans.

In the Italian province of Taranto (taking its name from Tarantas), Apulia, the bite of a locally common type of wolf spider, Lycosa tarantula (Lycos in Greek means 'wolf'), named "tarantula" after the region, was popularly believed to be highly venomous and to lead to a hysterical condition known as tarantism. This type of dance became known as the tarantella. R. Lowe Thompson proposed that the dance is a survival from a "Dianic or Dionysiac cult", driven underground. John Crompton later proposed that the Roman Senate had suppressed these ancient Bacchanalian rites. In 186 BC, the tarantella went underground, reappearing under the guise of emergency therapy for bite victims.

== Courtship versus tarantism dances ==
The stately courtship tarantella danced by a couple or couples, short in duration, is graceful and elegant and features characteristic music. On the other hand, the supposedly curative or symptomatic tarantella was danced solo by a victim of a Lycosa tarantula spider bite (not to be confused with what is commonly known as a tarantula today); it was agitated in character, lasted for hours or even up to days, and featured characteristic music. However, other forms of the dance were and still are dances of couples usually either mimicking courtship or a sword fight. The confusion appears to derive from the fact that the spiders, the condition, its sufferers (tarantolati), and the dances all have names similar to the city of Taranto.

The dance originated in the Apulia region, and spread throughout the Kingdom of the Two Sicilies. The Neapolitan tarantella is a courtship dance performed by couples whose "rhythms, melodies, gestures, and accompanying songs are quite distinct" featuring faster more cheerful music. Its origins may further lie in "a fifteenth-century fusion between the Spanish Fandango and the Moresque ballo di sfessartia". The "magico-religious" tarantella is a solo dance performed supposedly to cure through perspiration the delirium and contortions attributed to the bite of a spider at harvest (summer) time. The dance was later applied as a supposed cure for the behavior of neurotic women (carnevaletto delle donne).

There are several traditional tarantella groups: Cantori di Carpino, Officina Zoé, Uccio Aloisi gruppu, Canzoniere Grecanico Salentino, Selva Cupina, and I Tamburellisti di Torrepaduli.

The tarantella is most frequently played with a mandolin, a guitar, an accordion, and tambourines; flute, fiddle, trumpet, and clarinet are also used.

The tarantella is a dance in which the dancer and the drum player constantly try to upstage each other by playing faster or dancing longer than the other, subsequently tiring one person out first.

== Tarantism ==
Tarantism, as a ritual, is supposed to have roots in the ancient myths. Reportedly, victims who had collapsed or were convulsing would begin to dance with appropriate music and be revived as if a tarantula had bitten them. The music used to treat dancing mania appears to be similar to that used in the case of tarantism, although little is known about either. Justus Hecker (1795–1850), describes in his work Epidemics of the Middle Ages:

A convulsion infuriated the human frame [...]. Entire communities of people would join hands, dance, leap, scream, and shake for hours [...]. Music appeared to be the only means of combating the strange epidemic [...] lively, shrill tunes, played on trumpets and fifes, excited the dancers; soft, calm harmonies, graduated from fast to slow, high to low, prove efficacious for the cure.

The music used against spider bites featured drums and clarinets, was matched to the pace of the victim, and is only weakly connected to its later depiction in the tarantellas of Chopin, Liszt, Rossini, and Heller.

While most serious proponents speculated as to the direct physical benefits of the dancing rather than the power of the music, a mid-18th century medical textbook gets the prevailing story backwards, describing that tarantulas will be compelled to dance by violin music. It was thought that the Lycosa tarantula wolf spider had lent the name "tarantula" to an unrelated family of spiders, having been the species associated with Taranto, but since L. tarantula is not inherently deadly, the highly venomous Mediterranean black widow, Latrodectus tredecimguttatus, may have been the species originally associated with Taranto's manual grain harvest.

== See also ==
- List of tarantellas used in media and literature
- Tarantella Napoletana

== Relevant literature ==
- Inserra, Incoronata. 2017. Global Tarantella: Reinventing Southern Italian Folk Music and Dances. Urbana-Champaign: University of Illinois Press. 226 pages. ISBN 978-0-252-08283-2.
- Snodgrass, Mary Ellen (2016). The Encyclopedia of World Folk Dance. Rowman & Littlefield. ISBN 9781442257498.
