= Poliuto =

1838 opera by Gaetano Donizetti

- Opera by Gaetano Donizetti
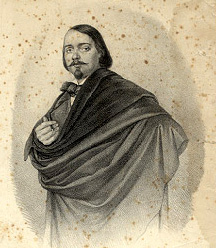
- Carlo Baucardé in the title role in 1848
- Librettist: Salvadore Cammarano
- Language: Italian
- Based on: Polyeucte by Pierre Corneille
- Premiere: 30 November 1848; Teatro San Carlo, Naples

Poliuto is a three-act tragedia lirica (or tragic opera) by Gaetano Donizetti from the Italian libretto by Salvadore Cammarano, which was based on Pierre Corneille's play Polyeucte written in 1641–42. It reflected the life of the early Christian martyr Saint Polyeuctus.

Regarded by one author as Donizetti's "most personal opera" with the music being "some of the finest Donizetti was to compose", Poliuto was written in 1838 for performances planned at the Teatro San Carlo in Naples later that year. However, close to the time for rehearsals to begin, King Ferdinand II refused to allow the martyrdom of a Christian saint to be seen on stage and forbade the production.

Angry at the decision and with a commission for the Paris Opéra due from the composer, Donizetti paid the penalty to the San Carlo for not producing an original work as a substitute, and left Naples for Paris arriving on 21 October. As his first commission for Paris, he decided to revise Poliuto and between 1839-40 a French text, with the title Les martyrs, was prepared by Eugene Scribe which conformed to the conventions of a French four-act grand opera, but which incorporated 80% of the music from Poliuto. It was presented in Paris on 10 April 1840. When eventually given in Italy, it was initially presented in a translation from the French version under the title of I martiri. It took until 30 November 1848, months after the composer's death, in order for Poliuto to finally appear for six performances at the San Carlo in its original Italian three-act version.

== Composition history ==
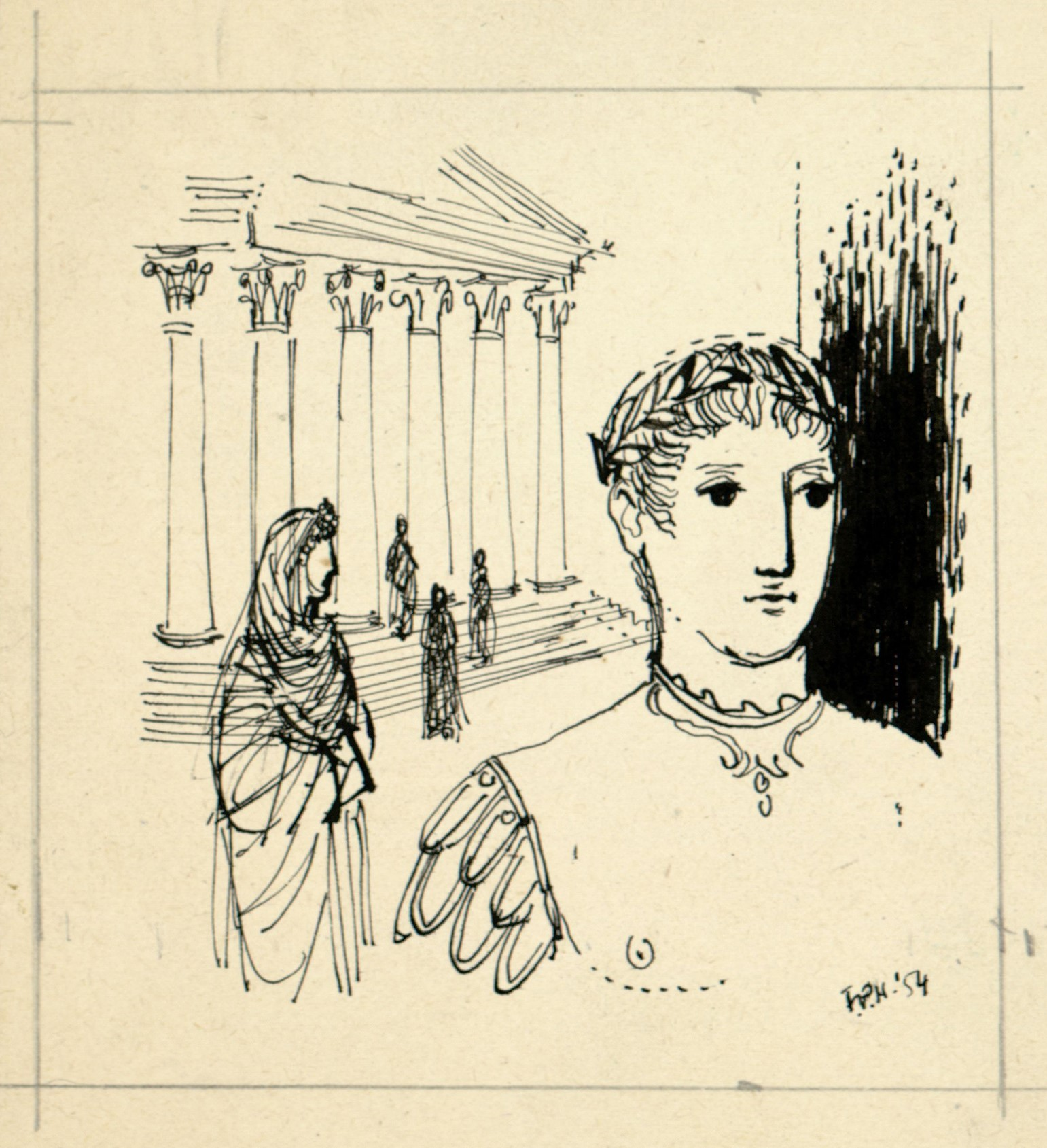
Disegno per copertina di libretto, drawing for Poliuto (undated).

=== As Poliuto ===
Although Donizetti had been gradually considering further involvement with Parisian stage, after the tremendous success of his Lucia di Lammermoor at the Théâtre-Italien in December 1837, as Roger Parker and William Ashbrook note "negotiations with Charles Duponchel [actually Henri Duponchel], the director of the Opéra, took on a positive note for the first time". In addition, while in Venice for the premiere of Maria de Rudenz (which was a failure) the following January, he had met and had been impressed with Adolphe Nourrit, who, for more than a decade, had been the principal tenor in Paris, having sung roles written for him by the major French composers such as Meyerbeer, Auber, Halevy, as well as Rossini (in William Tell) after he had moved to Paris. However, by the late 1830s, Nourrit’s popularity in Paris was in decline, and he was in danger of being supplanted in the public's affections by rising star Gilbert Louis Duprez.

Donizetti returned to Naples, arriving by February 24, where he began planning for the production of Poliuto. However, he had also hoped for a permanent supervisory appointment at the Collegio di San Pietro a Maiella. Instead, it went to the composer, Saverio Mercadante. Therefore, on 25 May 1838, Donizetti responded to an invitation from the Paris Opéra to compose two new works, specifying that the contract would require a libretto from Scribe with specific performance dates and a rehearsal periods included. With Donizetti committed to produce his next opera for Naples, musicologist William Ashbrook notes that the composer wrote Poliuto "with more than half an eye to its potential for it being recast as a French grand opera", something he had also done when writing L'assedio di Calais two years earlier, but which failed to gain attention outside Italy.

Since Nourrit was staying in Naples at the same time, determined to "take on a [singing] technique which was so different from that which he had been taught", he was grateful to the composer for lessons in that technique. Writing to his wife, he expresses his joy "at being born to a new artistic life" in singing Italian opera under the composer's direction, and he adds that Donizetti is "pulling strings to get me engaged here"

It is known that the tenor greatly influenced the composer in his choice of subject and in the progress of the new opera, such that Donizetti tailored the title role for the tenor who had then been engaged for the autumn season in Naples. However, he is also regarded as influencing Cammarano's contribution in adapting Corneille's play from what Ashbrook describes as "a spiritual drama, with its carefully observed unities" into a Romantic melodrama. This was achieved by adding elements such as Poliuto's jealousy, which did not exist in the original and, most especially, altering the play's narrative perspective of the action (which was originally seen through the eyes of Pauline's confidante, Stratonice) into directly-shown dramatic action, especially evidenced at the end of act 2 with Poliuto's overthrow of the altar.

The composer began work by 10 May on the music for the opera, which appears to have been planned for the autumn season. However, by the middle of June, a glitch in the proceedings had appeared in the form of a letter from the Superintendent of the Royal Theatres to the San Carlo intendant, Domenico Barbaja, reminding him that submission of a libretto for proposed autumn season opera was overdue. This was duly reported to Cammarano, who responded with some objections, not the least of which was that his original brief had been totally reversed: "a small part for the tenor and then, with the engagement of Signor Nourrit, this condition was totally changed" he stated. Barbaja backed up Cammarano's objection, which also included his inability to meet with the newly appointed censor, Royer, until his appointment was confirmed. Finally, the completed libretto moved up the chain of command with Royer's support until it reached the King. The Minister for Internal Affairs, who received the king's response, on 11 August communicated to Barbaja that "His majesty deigned with his own sacred hand to declare that the histories of the Martyrs are venerated in the Church and are not presented on the stage"

The opera's last-minute cancellation by the Catholic King of the Kingdom of the Two Sicilies angered the composer and, resolved to move to Paris to further his career there, he left Naples by October 1838, vowing never to have any further dealings with the San Carlo administration. But the cancellation dealt a crushing blow to Nourrit's hopes of reviving his flagging career, and even though he appeared in the opera which was substituted, Saverio Mercadante's Il giuramento, and then productions of Elena da Feltre and Norma which followed, depression overtook him. On 8 March 1839 he jumped to his death from a window of his apartment in Naples.

For his part, Cammarano re-used some of the verses he had set for Poliuto in other librettos, including Mercadante's La Vestale, some of which became quite well known. When it finally came time, ten years later, for Poliuto to be staged in Naples, he made a note in his preface to the libretto that: "out of respect for the music, and for the distinguished if unhappy friend who wrote it, I have left the poetry as it was in the original, appealing to the indulgence of the public."

=== Donizetti in Paris, 1838 to 1840 ===
With the Poliuto disaster behind him, Donizetti arrived in Paris in late October 1838 and quickly met and became friendly with the composer Adolphe Adam, who was living in the same apartment building where he was staying. Donizetti offered his Poliuto to the Académie Royale de Musique and it was accepted for performances to begin in April 1840.

While in Paris, a city which increasingly he came to dislike, Donizetti oversaw stagings of Roberto Devereux and L'elisir d'amore during the following December and January, and he also negotiated a longer time-frame for the delivery of the completed libretto of Les martyrs from Scribe as well as that for having the completed score of the second commission ready. This commission, which became known as Le duc d'Albe, was never completed.

During 1839, Lucia di Lammermoor, after being translated into French, became Lucie de Lammermoor, and this version was presented in August. With rehearsals for Les martyrs not planned until early 1840, the composer had time to write yet another opera, La fille du régiment, his first written directly to a French text. It received its premiere on 11 February 1840, by which time Les martyrs was in rehearsal for performances in April.

Although Donizetti was obliged to shift the placement of arias to other locations in the text, Scribe had to accept the modification of some of his text to fit the existing music but, given the overall expansion of the opera into four acts, new material needed to be created by both writer and composer, most especially for the end of act 1 and the beginning of act 2, both of which were expanded well beyond the original.

== Performance history ==
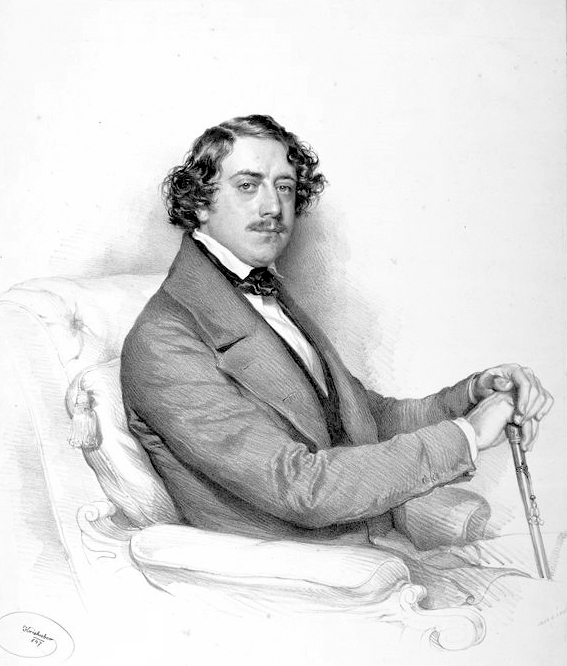
Filippo Colini, the original Severo

19th century

Prior to the original Poliuto being presented in Italy, a translation of Les martyrs appeared there as Paolina e Poliuto and then as Paolina e Severo (in Rome in December 1849), finally becoming I martiri. However, the "more compact, three-act Poliuto was generally preferred" and under its original title, it was given its premiere on 30 November 1848, a few months after Donizetti's death.

Prior to 1860, and performances were given in some sixteen locations throughout Italy and "fairly regularly throughout the second half of the [19th] century" In a German translation, it was given in Vienna on 6 June 1841 under Donizetti's supervision.

Later, it provided a vehicle for dramatic tenors such as Enrico Tamberlik (at Covent Garden in London in 1852) and Francesco Tamagno (in Rome in April 1883) and he also appeared in the second and third acts in a benefit in Rome in April 1904 conducted by Pietro Mascagni.

As Poliuto, it was not until 25 May 1859 that it was given in New York, but revived in Bergamo in April 1850 where it was produced nine times up to November 1907.

20th century and beyond

Productions of Poliuto staged from 1940 onward have included those at La Scala, Milan in 1940 (with Beniamino Gigli and Maria Caniglia). It was also given at the Roman Baths of Caracalla with Giacomo Lauri-Volpi in 1948, and appeared again in Milan in December 1960 (with Franco Corelli and Maria Callas). At that point in her career, Callas was at the height of her fame, albeit having been absent from La Scala for two years. However, her performances were regarded as triumphs with the public and many critics. Leyla Gencer sang the second batch of the same production with Franco Corelli.

Another Rome Opera production followed in 1989 with Nicola Martinucci and Elizabeth Connell and two productions were presented by the Donizetti Festival in Bergamo in 1993 and 2010. Other concert performances were given in the 1990s in cities such as Vienna (1986), Montpelier (1987), and New York (1998). The ABAO (Asociación Bilbaína de Amigos de la Ópera) company in Bilbao staged the work in February 2008 with Francisco Casanova and Fiorenza Cedolins in the two principal roles. It was given in Zurich in May 2012 with Massimiliano Pisapia in the title role and in Lisbon in April 2014 with tenor Sérgio Escobar, soprano Carmen Romeu and baritone Javier Franco, under the baton of Sergio Alapont.

As part of its 2015 season, the Glyndebourne Festival presented Poliuto with the support of the Peter Moores Foundation and it featured tenor Michael Fabiano in the title role with Ana Maria Martinez as Paolina and Enrique Mazzola conducting.

In 2016, the small company Amore Opera (the successor-company which inherited sets, props, and costumes from the defunct Amato Opera) performed Poliuto several times at the Sheen Center in New York City. The company billed this as the first fully staged production given in the USA since 1859, more than one hundred and fifty years before.

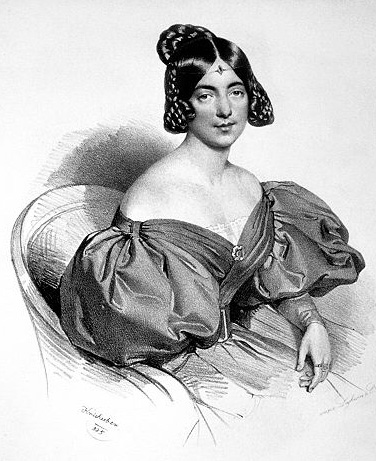
Eugenia Tadolini (1808–1872), the original Paolina

== Roles ==
Role	Voice type	Premiere Cast: Poliuto, 30 November 1848 (Conductor: Antonio Farelli)
Poliuto, Roman convert to Christianity	tenor	Carlo Baucardé
Paolina, Poliuto's wife	soprano	Eugenia Tadolini
Severo, Roman Proconsul	baritone	Filippo Colini
Felice, Paolina's father, Governor of Armenia	tenor	Anafesto Rossi
Callistene, High Priest of Jupiter	bass	Marco Arati
Nearco, a Christian, Poliuto's friend	tenor	Domenico Ceci
A Christian	tenor	

== Synopsis ==
Place: Melitene
Time: c. 259 A.D.

Armenia has been conquered by the Romans, and they have decreed that Christianity, which has a significant following in the country, must be destroyed and its followers put to death. Paolina had been in love with the Roman general, Severo, and had only married Poliuto after pressure from her father, Felice, who told her that Severo had been killed in battle.

=== Act 1: The Baptism ===
Scene 1: The Entrance to a Hidden Sanctuary

A secret gathering of Christian worshipers assembles, ready to be baptised into the new faith. (Chorus: Ancor ci asconda un velo arcano / "May a veil of secrecy still protect us From the ungodly sword which threatens us"). As they go into the cave, Poliuto, the principal magistrate of Melitene, enters and seeing his friend Nearco, the Christian leader, embraces him as he expresses his reservations about being baptised along with the others. He confides to his friend that he has misgivings regarding his wife’s loyalty to him, fearing that he still has a rival for her affections. Nearco, urging him to be calm and to turn his thoughts to God, causes Poliuto to pray: D'un'alma troppo fervida, tempra, buon Dio, gli affetti / "Temper the emotions, dear God, of a soul that is too ardent".

Poliuto enters the shrine, as his wife Paolina, who has been following him, arrives outside. She suspects that he has become a Christian convert, and waits for him to reappear from the baptism, recognizing that she has come to the right place. She calls to Nearco when he leaves the cave, and he warns her not to become involved since death is the penalty for all. Upon hearing the voices coming from the cave as the service progresses, she finds herself strangely moved by its sincerity and power as the Christians pray for their persecutors: "Yes, the prayer enters my heart" and, as the prayers continue, she feels the need to kneel as the Christians pray for their enemies as well: (Cavatina. Di quai soave lagrime, aspersa è la mia gota / "My cheeks are moistened, With such gentle tears, How this sweet unknown power, goes straight to my soul!....a dark veil seems to fall from my eyes").

At that moment, Nearco and Poliuto leave the sanctuary and find Paolina there: "Have you abandoned your religion?" she asks her husband, who states that he has no fear. Sounds of celebration outside are heard as Nearco returns to tell them that Severo, the Roman general, has returned from Rome: "The unsheathed sword hangs over all our heads" says Nearco, as Paolina realises that the report she had been given of Severo's death in battle was untrue. Experiencing both great joy and utter despair on learning that her lover has survived, she acknowledges to herself that now they can never be united. The Christians, proclaiming that they shall defy death, leave Paolina alone.

Scene 2: The Great Square of Melitene

A jubilant crowd hails the arrival of Severo: Plausi all'inclito Severo, lauri eterni alla sua chioma / "All hail the illustrious Severo, eternal laurels for his head". He addresses the people, and without specifying that he is describing the Christians, he tells them that he will sweep away the unholy rabble who, like a wicked serpent, are in their midst. Then, to himself, he expresses his desire to once again see his love. (Cavatina: Di tua beltade imagine è questo sol ch'io miro / "This sun I see is the image of your beauty".) Greeted by Callistene, he sees Felice, wishes to embrace him, and asks where his daughter is. In his awkward reply, Felice points to Poliuto, acknowledging him as Paolina's husband. Together, Severo, Callistene and Felice express their anger, frustration and confusion, with Severo enraged and bitter when he realizes that Paolina is married. (Cabaletta: No, l'acciar non fu spietato che versava il sangue mio / "No, the sword that spilled my blood was not merciless, but the god who kept me alive was merciless indeed!") Again, each man expresses his anguish: for Poliuto it is a "cold hand gripping his heart"; for Callistene it is revenge; and for Felice, the "sun has become enshrouded in a thick cloud."

=== Act 2: The Neophyte ===
Scene 1: The gardens of Felice’s house

Callistene and Severo are at Felice's home where the priest tells Severo that it is possible that it was Felice's idea that Paolina marry Poliuto. He then leaves, and Severo waits for Paolina who is surprised to find him in her father's house. Angrily he confronts her: Il più lieto dei vivent / "Returning to this land, I was the happiest man alive! I hoped our marriage would be a blissful paradise!.." Clearly conflicted by Severo's sudden confrontation and, as he states that "my joy has turned to weeping, my broken heart is bleeding", she expresses to herself the anguish which overtakes her: (aria): Ei non vegga il pianto mio / "He must not see my weeping, nor understand my agitation... If there is a merciful God in heaven, may he protect me from myself. All my former passion is re-awakening in my heart". Severo's pleas to her are rebuffed, albeit with some reluctance. In the background, Poliuto and Callistene are seen arriving.

Finally, Paolina expresses her frustration: Quest'alma è troppo debole, In cosi ro cimento!... / "This soul is too weak for such a cruel trial" and she demands that Severo leave her to her grief. No, vivi, esulta, o barbara / "No, live and rejoice, cruel woman" he replies and, together, they express their conflicting feelings, with Severo finally leaving and Paolina entering the house.

Entering alone, Poliuto, believes that the couple are guilty and he pledges to revenge this attack on his honour by killing them both: (aria:) Valeno è l'aura ch'io respire! Indegna! / "The air I breathe is poison to me! Despicable woman!.....So tremble guilty couple... My honour has been sullied! This calls for vengeance. Ah! my love for her was immense!.. Now my fury is immense!" But his bitter thoughts of revenge are interrupted by the news that Nearco, a fellow Christian, has been arrested by the Romans for his religious beliefs. Quickly, he casts aside thoughts of revenge as he realizes that greater action is required: (Cabaletta:) Sfolgorò divino raggio, Da' miei lumi è tolto il velo / "A ray of divine light blazed down, the veil has fallen from my eyes [......] A holy voice as if from heaven spoke to me of forgiveness." He rushes off to the Temple.

Scene 2: The Temple of Jupiter

The Priests are assembled along with Callistene, Severo, Paolina, and the people. The High Priest calls down the vengeance of the gods upon those who insult the sacred cult. As Nearco is dragged into the temple in chains, Callistene demands to know the name of an important new convert to Christianity about whom he has heard rumour. Initially, Nearco refuses to betray the convert, but when Severo threatens him with torture until he speaks, Poliuto proudly reveals himself to be the man they seek.

All assembled express their feelings in an ensemble: Severo, Callistene, Felice, Priests and the People: La sacrilege parole Nel delubro ancor rimbomba / "The sacrilegious word Still resounds in the temple" and, addressing Poliuto, declare "You are destined to eternal punishment amongst the dead"; Paolina: Qual preghiera al Ciel disciolgo? / "What prayer can I now offer up?"; Poliuto: Dio, proteggi l'umil servo, A morir per te qui vengo/ "God, protect your humble servant, I have come here to die for you, but worldly emotions rise up fiercely to fight again"; and Nearco expresses a longing for death for himself.

In a concerted finale, Paolina entreats her father to save her husband’s life, and then throws herself at Severo’s feet, begging him to show mercy for the sake of the love she knows he still has for her. Her actions so enrage Poliuto that he breaks free from his captors and smashes the pagan altar. He is quickly overpowered and led away with Nearco, as Felice forcibly removes his daughter from the temple.

=== Act 3: Martyrdom ===
Scene 1: A sacred wood near the Temple of Jupiter

In the distance, the people can be heard encouraging all to go to the arena where they will see blood flow. (Chorus: Vieni, vieni...al circo andiamo... / "Come, come...let's go to the arena").

Priests enter awaiting the arrival of Callistene, the High Priest. He tells them that others have come forward and declared that they too will die for the Christian cause, while Paolina has gone to plead for Poliuto. Callistene encourages the priests to stir up the crowd. (Aria, then repeated by all: Alimento alla fiamma si porga, Tal che incendio vorace ne sorga / "Let the flames be fanned, So that a voracious fire blazes").

Scene 2: Inside the prison of the Temple of Jupiter

In his prison cell, Poliuto is asleep and wakes up, somewhat confused. He has dreamed that Paolina is in truth a loyal and faithful wife. (Aria: Visione gradita!... Bella, e di sol vestita / "A happy vision! Beautiful in the sunlight My wife ascended heavenward.") Just then, he hears someone approaching, and it is Paolina, who has persuaded the guards to let her visit him. Although she explains that she did love Severo before meeting Poliuto, she now wishes nothing more than his death. Suspicious, Poliuto asks why then did she invite him to meet her at her father's house, but she denies that this happened and explains that it was a plot by the High Priest. He understands, silently begging for her forgiveness as he forgives her before he will die.

They are reconciled, and Paolina tells him that it is arranged that he need not die if he renounces his Christian beliefs. He responds: "But my soul would be lost!". Paolina: (Aria: A' piedi tuoi son io... Ah! fuggi da morte / "I am at your feet... Ah! flee from a death, That is so horrible".) But Poliuto is certain that eternal salvation awaits him after death: (Aria: Lasciando la terra, Il giusto non muore / "The just man does not die when leaving the world; He is reborn in heaven to a better life"). Coraggio inaudito! ("What incredible courage"), she exclaims, and recognising the strength of his faith, Paolina begs him to baptize her, so that she can die with him. At first Poliuto is unwilling to perform the baptism, but when he sees that her conversion is genuine, he agrees: "Grace has entered your soul. The road to salvation has just opened for you" he tells her.

Together they sing of the joys of eternal life together, Paolina exclaiming Ah! Il suon dell'arpe angeliche / "Ah! I already hear the sound, of angelic harps all around me! I see the light of a hundred and a hundred more suns shining!" and then, together, "It is granted me to live with you, in heaven for all eternity...." The doors to the amphitheatre open, revealing huge crowds waiting for the condemned.

Severo and his men arrive to take Poliuto to the arena. He chooses death and, when Paolina declares "I have embraced the faith of his God", Severo is horrified. She demands to die with her husband, but Severo continues to urge her to reconsider, at the same time as Callistene and the assembled priests continue to demand their deaths. In spite of his attempts, Severo fails to persuade Paolina to save herself because of her father, and the couple proclaim: "Let us die together". The signal is heard.

In a concerted finale, each expresses his or her feelings: Paolina and Poliuto (Il suon dell'arpe angeliche / "I already hear the sound of angelic harps"); Callistene, some Priests, and the assembled women (Sia maledetto, Chi reca insulta, Dei gran Tonante / "Cursed be he, who dares insult, the holy cult"); Severo (Giove crudel, famelico, Di sangue e di vendetta / "Cruel Jupiter, starving, for blood and vengeance"); and the Priests urging them on to the arena. After one last attempt to change Paolina's mind, the couple, along with the condemned Christians, go off to their deaths.

== Recordings ==
Year	Cast (Poliuto, Paolina, Severo, Callistene)	Conductor, Opera House and Orchestra	Label
1960	Franco Corelli, Maria Callas, Ettore Bastianini, Nicola Zaccaria	Antonino Votto; Teatro alla Scala Orchestra and Chorus (Recording of a performance at La Scala, 7 December)	Audio CD: EMI CDMB; Cat: 5 65448-2
1986	José Carreras, Katia Ricciarelli, Juan Pons, László Polgár	Oleg Caetani; Vienna Symphony Orchestra	Audio CD: Sony Classical; Cat: CSCR 8119-20
1989	Nicola Martinucci, Elizabeth Connell, Renato Bruson, Franco Federici	Jan Latham-Koenig; Teatro dell'Opera di Roma Orchestra and Chorus (Live recording)	Audio CD: Nuova Era; Cat: 6776/77
1993	José Sempere, Denia Mazzola Gavazzeni, Simone Alaimo, Ildebrando d'Arcangelo	Gianandrea Gavazzeni, Orchestra Sonfonica dell'Emilia Romagna and the Coro del Teatro Donizetti di Bergamo. (Recording of a performance of the critical edition at the Donizetti Festival in Bergamo, September)	Audio CD: Ricordi, Cat: RFCD 2023
2010	Gregory Kunde, Paoletta Marrocu, Simone Del Savio, Andrea Papi	Marcello Rota, Bergamo Musica Festival Orchestra and Chorus (Recorded at the Teatro Donizetti, Bergamo, September)	DVD: Bongiovanni, Cat: 20021
2016	Michael Fabiano, Ana Maria Martinez, Igor Golovatenko, Matthew Rose	Enrique Mazzola, London Philharmonic, Glyndebourne Festival Opera chorus, Mariame Clément, stage director	DVD:Opus Arte; Cat:OA1211D
