= I briganti =

I briganti may refer to:

- I briganti (Mercadante), 1836 opera
- I briganti, 1841 opera by Luigi Arditi
- I briganti, 1916 film by Percy Nash with Diana D'Amore, Ignazio Lupi, Sandro Ruffini
- I briganti, 1983 film with Al Cliver
