= Eugenio Cavallini =

Italian composer

Eugenio Cavallini (16 June 1806 — 11 April 1881) was an Italian conductor, composer, violinist, and violist. In 1833 he became first violinist of the orchestra at La Scala, a post he held through 1855. He also served as a conductor at La Scala, notably leading the world premieres of Gaetano Donizetti's Lucrezia Borgia (1833), Donizetti's Gemma di Vergy (1834), Donizetti's Maria Stuarda (1835), Saverio Mercadante's Il giuramento (1837), Mercadante's Il bravo (1839), Giuseppe Verdi's Oberto (1839), Verdi's Un giorno di regno (1840), Donizetti's Maria Padilla (1841), Verdi's Nabucco (1842), Verdi's I Lombardi alla prima crociata (1843), Verdi's Giovanna d'Arco (1845), Federico Ricci's Estella di Murcia (1846), and Domenico Ronzani's Salvator Rosa (1854).

At La Scala Cavallini also conducted performances of Vincenzo Bellini's La sonnambula (1834), Donizetti's L'elisir d'amore (1834), Bellini's I puritani (1835), Daniel Auber's La muette de Portici (1838), Donizetti's Lucia di Lammermoor (1839), Donizetti's La fille du régiment (1840), Donizetti's Don Pasquale (1843), Donizetti's Linda di Chamounix (1844), Verdi's Ernani (1844), Verdi's Attila (1846), Verdi's Jérusalem (1850), Verdi's Rigoletto (1853), Verdi's Il trovatore (1853), Giacomo Meyerbeer's Les Huguenots (1854), Donizetti's Maria di Rohan (1855), Gioachino Rossini's The Barber of Seville (1855), Errico Petrella's Marco Visconti (1855), and Rossini's Otello (1855).

== Selected works ==
- Divertimento in G major for viola solo and string quartet (or string orchestra) (1829)
- Guida per lo studio della viola (Viola Method), Book II: 24 Studi in tuoni minori (24 Studies in Minor Keys) for viola solo (c.1845)
- Guida per lo studio della viola (Viola Method), Book III: Concert Pieces for viola and piano (c.1845)

1. Fantasia
2. Souvenir
3. Fantasia originale (a.k.a. Fantasia) for viola and piano (or 2 violas, 2 cellos and double bass)
4. Tema con Variazioni
5. Polacca
6. Fantasia originale
7. Tema Variato (Theme and Variations) in E♭ major
8. Adagio Variato dell'Opera Poliuto
9. Serenata

- Riminiscenze di Santa Cristina, Fantasy for solo viola, 2 violas, 2 cellos and double bass
