= I due Figaro (Carafa) =

1820 opera

I due Figaro, o sia Il soggetto di una commedia
- melodramma buffo by Michele Carafa
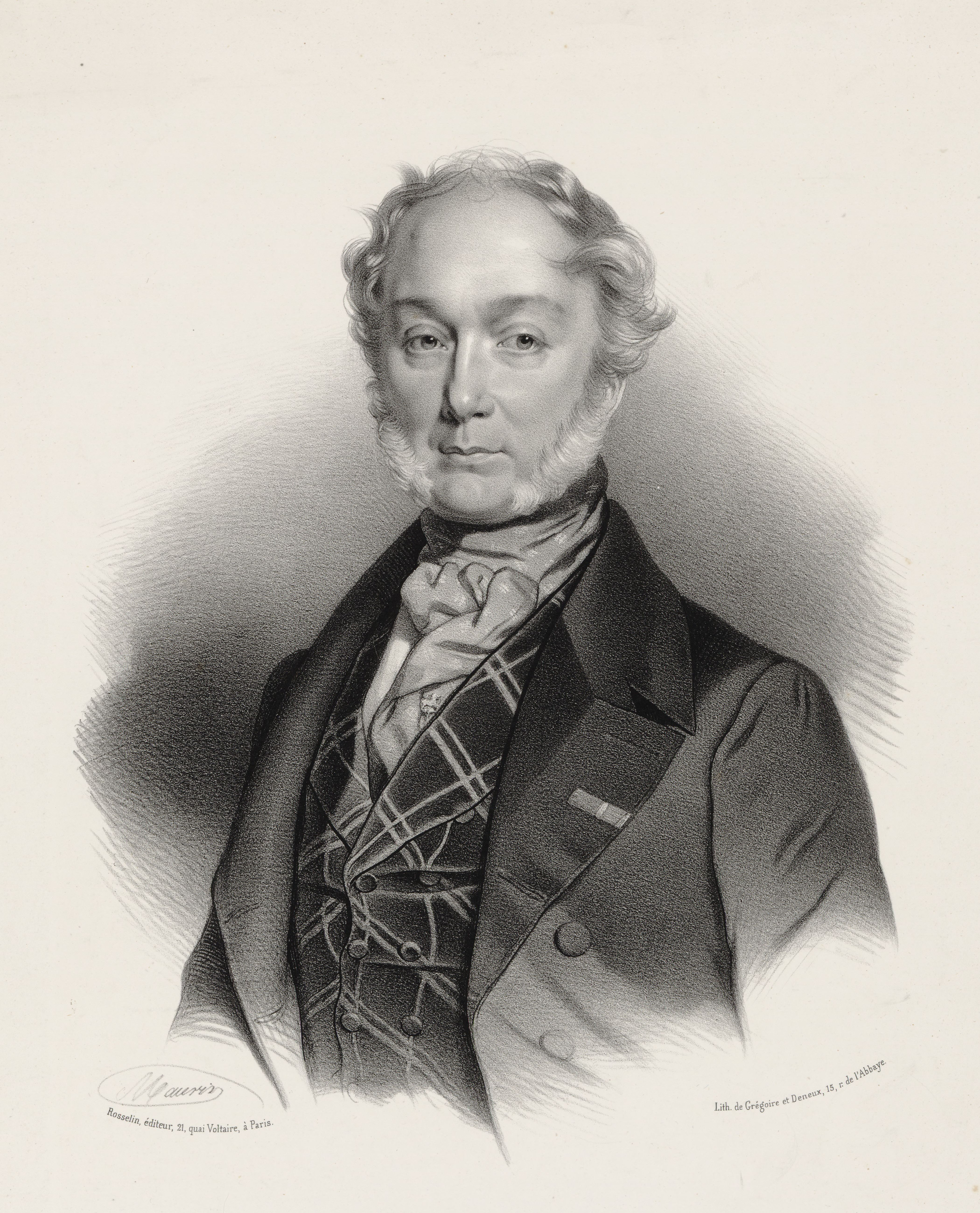
- Michele Carafa
- Translation: The Two Figaros, or, The Subject of a Comedy
- Librettist: Felice Romani
- Language: Italian
- Based on: Les deux Figaro by Honoré-Antoine Richaud Martelly
- Premiere: 6 June 1820; La Scala, Milan, Kingdom of Lombardy–Venetia

I due Figaro, o sia Il soggetto di una commedia is an Italian-language opera (melodramma buffo) in two acts by Michele Carafa to a libretto by Felice Romani based on Les deux Figaro by Honoré-Antoine Richaud Martelly. The opera is a homage to Mozart, and tells of the further adventures of Cherubino, returned after 12 years in the army. The opera premiered at La Scala in Milan on 6 June 1820.

The review in Vienna's Allgemeine musikalische Zeitung of the premiere was negative: "I now turn to the third spring opera—titled I due Figaro—newly composed by Mr. Carafa and performed for the first time last Tuesday, albeit with unfavorable results. Even if Rossini has gone to great lengths in the realm of noisy and clamorous music, all of that still amounts to a sonata played on a mandolin when compared with certain passages in our new opera. In its introduction, Carafa has reached the non plus ultra of sheer uproar—though, to make the effect truly complete, only the cannons are missing. No human ear is capable of following this veritable sea of notes; indeed, certain church pieces by Reuter—even those taken at a rapid tempo—seem like Adagios next to the stretta of this introduction. This very first, lengthy movement of the opera so thoroughly exhausts the poor orchestra that they have precious little energy left to execute the subsequent pieces."

Aimé Leborne (1797–1866) arranged his friend Carafa's work as Les deux Figaro at the Théâtre Odéon, Paris, 22 August 1827.

== Recording ==
- I Due Figaro. Simon Bailey (Cherubino), Carmine Monaco (Figaro), Giorgio Trucco (Il Conte), Rosella Bevacqua (Contessa Rosina), Cinzia Rizzone (Susanna), Vittorio Prato (Plagio), Eunshil Kim (Inez), Giuseppe Fedeli (Torribio), Württembergische Philharmonie Reutlingen, Brad Cohen, Kurhaus Bad Wildbad 2006 DVD
