= Carlo Baucardé =

Italian operatic tenor

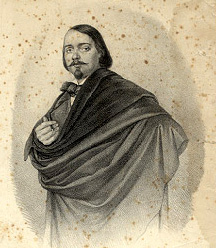
- Born: 1825; Florence, Italy
- Died: 22 January 1883 (aged 57–58); Florence, Italy
- Occupation: Opera singer (tenor)

Carlo Baucardé or Boucardé (1825–1883) was an Italian operatic tenor who sang leading roles throughout Italy, as well as in London, Madrid, Paris, and New York. He is most remembered today for creating the role of Manrico in Verdi's opera Il trovatore and the title role in Donizetti's Poliuto.

== Life and career ==
Carlo Baucardé was born in Florence to a family of French origin. According to contemporary accounts, he had originally been employed in the palace kitchen of the Grand Duke of Tuscany where he first attracted attention by his talent for cookery, and later by his talent for singing which enabled him to receive musical training. His earliest known appearance was in Florence in 1847 as Carlo ("Il bravo") in Mercadante's Il bravo. Between 1848 and 1850, he sang frequently in Naples at the Teatro San Carlo. He appeared in three operas by Verdi, all in their first performances at that theatre: I Lombardi alla prima crociata as Arvino (1848), Macbeth as Malcolm (1849), and I masnadieri as Carlo (1849). He also sang there in the premiere of Donizetti's Poliuto in the title role (1848) and in the theatre's first performance of his La favorita as Fernando (1850).

Baucardé made his London debut to considerable popular acclaim as Oronte in I Lombardi alla prima crociata during the 1850 season of Italian opera at Her Majesty's Theatre. During that season he also performed the leading tenor roles in Verdi's I due Foscari, Bellini's I puritani, and Donizetti's Lucrezia Borgia. Benjamin Lumley, the Director of Her Majesty's Theatre at the time, wrote of Baucardé:

Nothing was expected, yet great results were achieved. With a charmingly sweet, but still robust voice of wonderful extension; with a style wherein the use of the falsetto was at once sparingly and judiciously employed, this young artist won easily upon a public accustomed to give a preference to natural gifts over the display of skill. Not that Baucarde was deficient in skill; on the contrary, his " school" was excellent. As an actor, he rose scarcely above mediocrity, but any deficiency in this respect was overlooked in the splendour of his "organ".

In 1851, Baucardé sang the title role in the world premiere of Gualtiero Sanelli's Camoëns at the Teatro Regio in Turin where he also sang Gualtiero in Bellini's Il pirata (1852), Arturo Talbo in his I puritani (1852), and the Duke of Mantua in Verdi's Rigoletto (1852). Baucardé achieved particular success as the Duke, both in Turin and elsewhere. Verdi then cast Baucardé as the first Manrico in Il trovatore, although he had previously wanted Raffaele Mirate for the role. The premiere at the Teatro Apollo in Rome on 19 January 1853 was a great success not only for Verdi, but also for Baucardé. His popular acclaim in the role increased when he substituted a high C for the original G in the finale of "Di quella pira" during a later performance of Trovatore in Florence. He went on to sing Manrico for the Paris premiere of the opera on 23 December 1854 at the Théâtre-Italien. The following month, he again appeared at the Théâtre-Italien in the title role of Pacini's now forgotten opera, L'ultimo dei Clodovei.

Despite his great popularity in Italy, Baucardé failed to impress one British observer, Frances Minto Elliot. Writing under the pseudonym "Florentia", she described his 1854 Rome performance in Lucrezia Borgia thus:

Boucarde is a fat and stupid Gennaro, the real and veritable "pescatore ignobile", and not the high-bred, unmistakable patrician Mario appears, even in his dingy dress. There is not a grain of romance about Boucarde, and his voice is no more comparable to Mario's silvery tones than his appearance. The fact is, he drinks like a fish, and is rapidly ruining a naturally fine organ. He made a good point in giving the words "Era mia madre, ah! misera", with an expression of deep pathos that brought down rounds of applause, and a particular kind of roar peculiar to a gratified Italian crowd, very savage and bloodthirsty to the ears, reminding one of revolutions and all kinds of horrors.

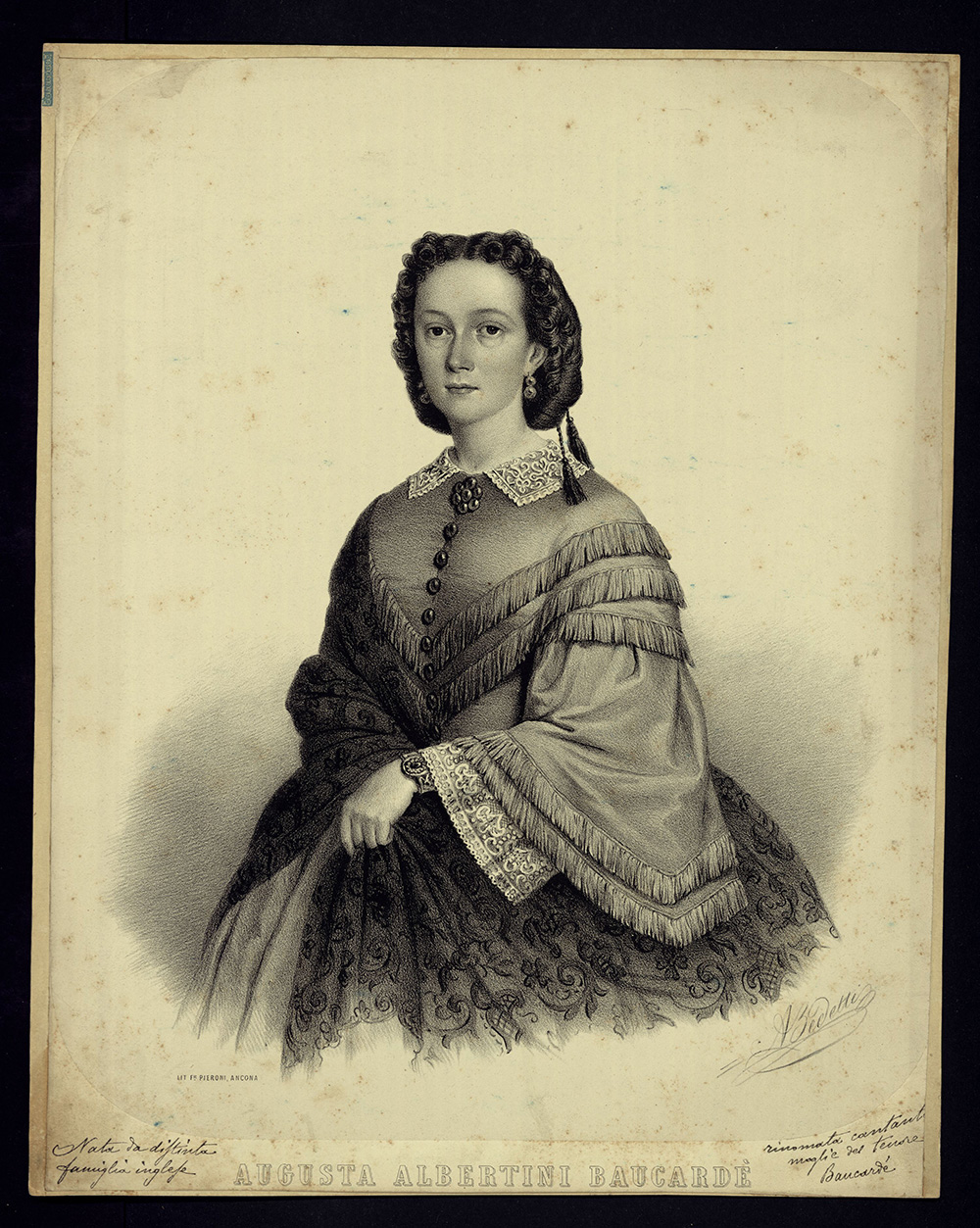
Augusta Albertini Baucardè by Augusto Bedetti

Baucardé was married to a prominent, but notoriously temperamental soprano, Augusta Albertini (1823–1898) and often sang with her. When she was proposed for the role of Mina in the 1857 premiere casting of Verdi's Aroldo, Verdi wrote to his librettist Francesco Maria Piave:

In short, as regards Albertini, I tell you, no. I've had more than enough of her husband, and I don't want anything more to do with lunatics.

From 1859 to 1860, the couple sang at the Academy of Music in New York, but the venture was not successful. By then, Baucardé was past his prime. He retired from the stage in 1863 and died in his native Florence on 22 January 1883.
