= Michele Carafa =

Italian opera composer

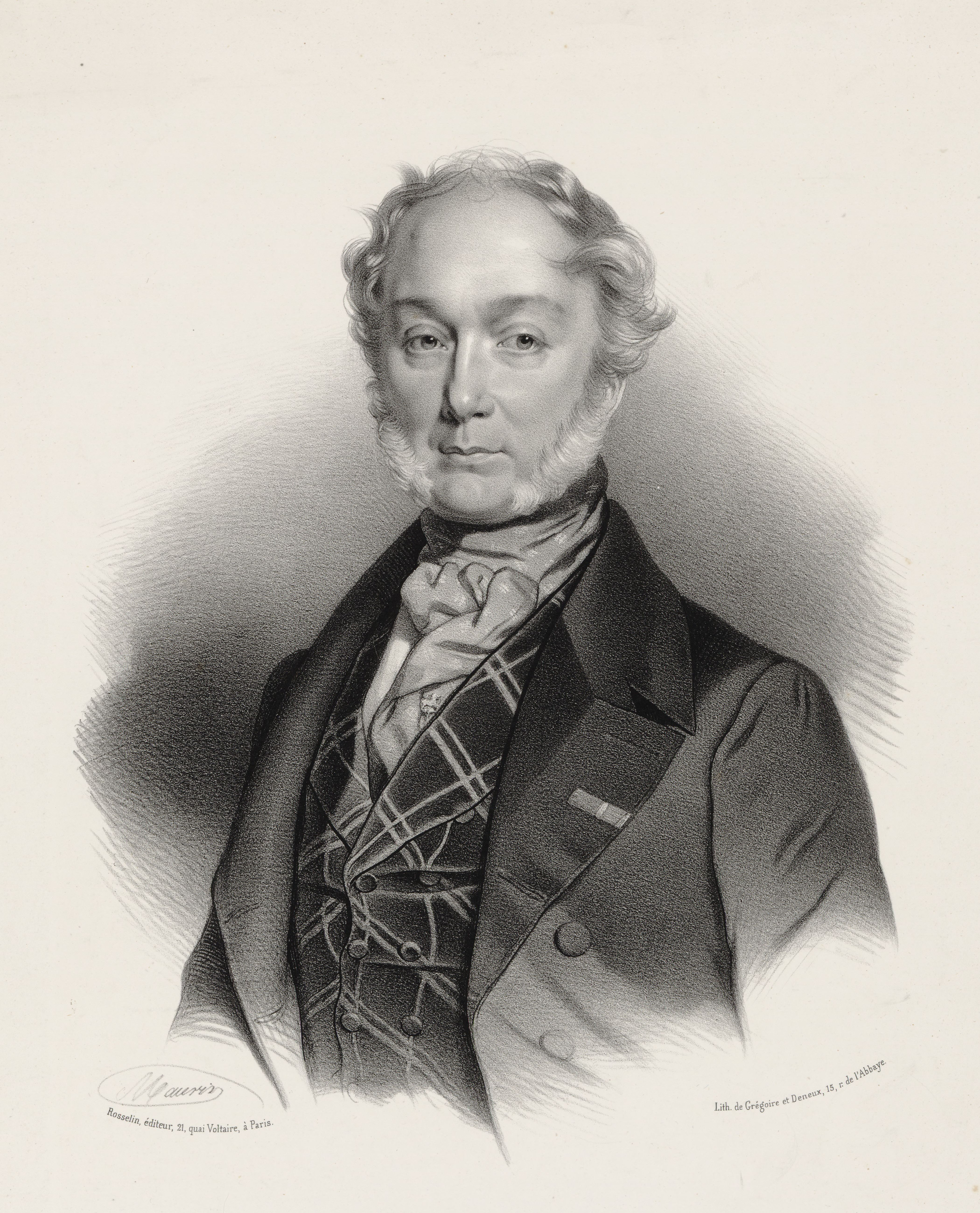
- Carafa, lithograph by Antoine Maurin
- Born: 9 November 1821; Naples, Italy
- Died: 11 February 1894 (aged 72); Paris, France
- Education: Conservatoire de Paris
- Occupations: Composer; Academic teacher

Michele Enrico Francesco Vincenzo Aloisio Paolo Carafa di Colobrano (17 November 1787 – 26 July 1872) was an Italian opera composer. He was born in Naples and studied in Paris with Luigi Cherubini. He was professor of counterpoint at the Paris Conservatoire from 1840 to 1858. One of his notable pupils was Achille Peri.

== Life and work ==
Michele Enrico was born the second son of Giovanni Carafa, prince of Colubrano and duke of Alvito, and princess Teresa Lembo. He was given a solid musical education. In 1802, he composed his first opera, Il Fantasma, which was staged at the theater of his father-in-law, prince of Caramanico, in 1805. He moved in 1806 to Paris, where he was taught composition by Luigi Cherubini and piano by Friedrich Kalkbrenner.

However, pressured by his father to give up music for a military career, he became a lieutenant of the hussars in Napoleon's army. Taken prisoner in the Battle of Campo Tenese in 1806, he was freed and participated in the war against Sicily, where he became captain.

Returning to Naples in 1808, he married Antoinette d'Aubenton (or Daubenton) and studied music under Fedele Fenaroli. Again pressured by his father, he followed Joachim Murat in the Russian campaign. After the Battle of Ostrovno, he was personally awarded the Legion of Honor by Napoleon himself and made a baron of the Napoleonic Kingdom of Italy.

When the Bourbons were restored in Naples, the property of the Carafa family was confiscated and the military career of Michele Enrico was over, so he could finish his musical education. The Teatro del Fondo staged his Il Vascello d'occidente in 1814 and Gabriella di Vergy, written by Andrea Leone Tottola, in 1816. The latter was as popular as Rossini's Otello, staged the same year at the same theatre. In fact, Rossini asked him to compose an aria for his opera Mosè in Egitto (1818). It was the Pharaoh's aria in the first act. However, Rossini would later rewrite the aria at the request of Ferdinand Hérold, who conducted the opera in Paris.

Carafa's music is marked by a certain lightness of melody and simple orchestration, in a period dominated by Rossini, Bellini, Auber, Halévy, who were all his friends. Established as an opera composer, he returned to Paris in 1821, where he had success with Jeanne d'Arc à Orléans and Le Valet de Chambre in 1823.

After Il Parìa in Venice, he definitely moved to Paris and struggled, before Masaniello (libretto by Moreau de Mommagny and A.-M. Lafortelle) became a great success and was given 136 times at Opéra-Comique. It was the pinnacle of his career, as he could not compete with the works of Rossini and Donizetti.

He obtained French citizenship in 1834 and membership in the Académie des beaux-arts in 1837, and became director of the Academy of Military Music (Gymnase de musique militaire) in 1838. From 1840 to 1858, he taught the counterpoint and composition at the Conservatoire de Paris. In his history of music, Émile Vuillermoz describes how he opposed the introduction of saxophone, so his partisans were called the "Carafons", while the friends of Adolphe Sax were called the "Saxons".

His last staged work was Thérèse (1838), when he was already a full-time professor. One of his last contributions to opera was the French adaptation of Rossini's Semiramide (1861), for which Rossini released him the copyright as a sign of a long friendship. On that occasion, Carafa composed a ballet for Rossini's opera. Rossini would later dedicate one of his "old-age sins" to Carafa.

In his memoirs, Massenet mentions that Carafa was a member of the commission that accepted him into the Conservatoire de Paris.

Carafa had no children, so he adopted his wife's nephew Michel Daubenton.

Struck by paralysis in 1867, Carafa died in Paris on 26 July 1872, aged 84. He was buried together with his wife Antoinette d'Aubenton and his mother-in-law Victoire Douat at Montmartre Cemetery.

Several of his operas were eclipsed by others dealing with the same subject matter: Masaniello by Auber's La muette de Portici (1828); Le Nozze di Lamermoor by Donizetti's Lucia di Lammermoor (1835); La Grande Duchesse by Offenbach's La Grande-Duchesse de Gérolstein (1867).

== Selected operas ==
Stanford University's list of Carafa's operas shows that he wrote 29, which were performed between 1816 and 1847.

- Gabriella di Vergy (1816)
- Berenice in Siria (1818)
- Elisabetta in Derbyshire ossia Il castello di Fotheringhay (Elizabeth [1st] in Derbyshire, or Fotheringay Castle), (December 1818). Based on Friedrich Schiller's play (1802)
- I due Figaro (1820)
- Jeanne d'Arc à Orléans (1821)
- Le solitaire (1822)
- Le valet de chambre (1823)
- Il sonnambulo (1824)
- La belle au bois dormant (Sleeping Beauty) (1825)
- Masaniello (1828)
- Le nozze di Lammermoor (1829)
- La prison d'Édimbourg (1833)
