= Augusta Albertini =

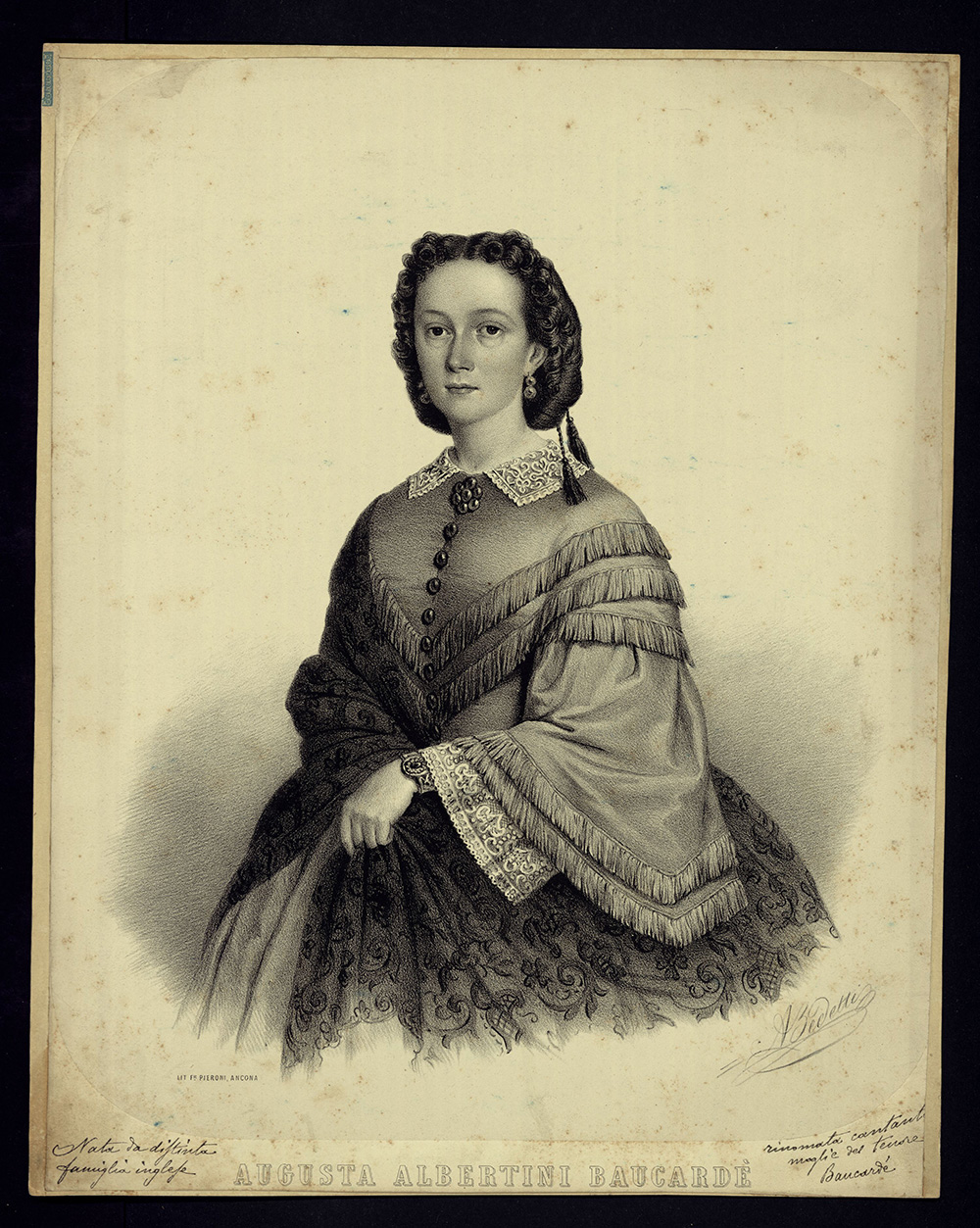
Augusta Albertini

Augusta Albertini, also known as Augusta Albertini-Baucardé, (born Augusta Rosina Aitchinson, 5 June 1823 – 23 January 1898) was an English soprano. Born in England, she was trained at the Accademia di Belle Arti di Firenze in Italy. She had international performance career from 1844 to 1872.

== Biography ==
The daughter of James and Eliza Ellen Aitchinson (also spelled Aitcheson), Augusta Rosina Aitchinson was born in Bristol, England on 5 June 1823. She was baptized at St Stephen's Church, Bristol. Her mother was a talented amateur harpist and pianist. According to Kurt Gänzl, reports that she was born in Italy are in error. The Aitcheson family moved to Italy when she was young. She studied in Florence with Geremia Sbolci and Ferdinando Ceccherini at the Accademia di Belle Arti di Firenze, and later privately in that city with Caroline Unger.

Albertini made her professional opera debut at the age of seventeen at the Teatro Nacional de São Carlos in Lisbon on 7 March 1844 in the title role of Donizetti's Parisina. She performed in many operas opposite tenor Enrico Tamberlik at that theatre, and also in theaters in Madrid and Oporto. She sang the title role in Bellini's Norma for her first appearance in Rome in 1848, and also had great success in that city as Abigaille in Nabucco and Amalia in I masnadieri. She also sang in several operas at the Teatro Comunale of Bologna in the 1848–1849 season; including the title role in Lucia di Lammermoor. She repeated I masnadieri in Modena (1849), Naples (1849), and Faenza (1850).

In 1850 she performed the title role in Luisa Miller at the Teatro Apollo in Rome, the Teatro della Pergola in Florence, and the Teatro Ventidio Basso in Ascoli. She was also seen in Rome that year as Lucrezia Contarini in I due Foscari and Lina in Stiffelio. She performed Luisa Miller at the Teatro Comunale in Fermo in 1851, and sang in many operas in Ferrara, Forli, and Trieste. She remained active in theaters in Italy and abroad until her retirement from the stage in 1872. She married to the tenor Carlo Baucardé who was her frequent stage parter.

Albertini died in Florence, Italy on 23 January 1898.
