= Di quella pira =

Aria from the opera Il trovatore by Giuseppe Verdi

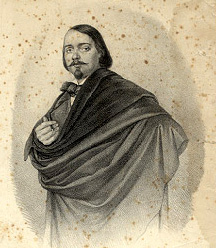
Carlo Baucardé, the first Manrico

"Di quella pira" ("Of that pyre") is a short tenor aria (or more specifically, a cabaletta) sung by Manrico in act 3, scene 2, of Giuseppe Verdi's opera Il trovatore. It is the last number of the act.

== Setting ==
In a chamber adjoining the chapel at Castellor, Leonora and Manrico vow their love for each other. After Manrico's aria "Ah sì, ben mio coll'essere" ("Ah, yes, my love, in being yours"), they are about to take their marriage vows. However, Ruiz, Manrico's comrade, suddenly returns to report that Manrico's mother Azucena is to be burned at the stake. Manrico calls together his soldiers and sings of how they will save Azucena from death: "Di quella pira l'orrendo foco tutte le fibre m'arse, avvampò!..." ("The horrible blaze of that pyre burned, enflamed all of my being!...")

== Music ==
The vocal range is from E_{3} to A_{4} with a tessitura from G_{3} to G_{4}, with three optional high C_{5}'s. The key signature is C major and the time signature is a triple metre; it is 39 bars long.

== Libretto ==
Manrico
Di quella pira l'orrendo foco
Tutte le fibre m'arse, avvampò!...
Empi, spegnetela, o ch'io fra poco
Col sangue vostro la spegnerò...
Era già figlio prima d'amarti,
Non può frenarmi il tuo martir.
Madre infelice, corro a salvarti,
O teco almeno corro a morir!

Leonora
Non reggo a colpi tanto funesti...
Oh quanto meglio sarìa morir!

Ruiz, Chorus of soldiers
All'armi, all'armi! eccone presti
A pugnar teco, teco a morir.

Of that pyre, the horrendous fire
Has burned all my fibres!
Imps, extinguish it, or else I will shortly
Extinguish it with your blood!
He was already a son before he loved you,
Your pain cannot restrain me.
Unhappy mother, I run to save you,
Or at least I run to die with you!

I can't stand such fatal blows ...
Oh how much better it will be to die!

To arms, to arms! Here we are
To fight with you, with you to die.

Of that dark scaffold, those flames ascending,
Thrill thro' each fibre with madd'ning glow!
Quench them, ye monsters vile or, still offending,
To stay their fury, your blood shall flow!
I was her offspring, ere love I gave thee,
In vain, to hold me, thy griefs would try.
Mother unhappy! I fly to save thee,
Or, all else failing, with thee to die!

Such heavy sorrows my heart o'erpow'ring.
Oh! better far would it be to die!

Arouse ye to arms now!
The foe we will defy!
