= Elena da Feltre =

19th-century opera composed by Saverio Mercadante

Saverio Mercadante

Elena da Feltre is an opera in three acts by 19th-century Italian composer Saverio Mercadante from a libretto by Salvatore Cammarano, well known as librettist of Donizetti's Lucia di Lammermoor and Verdi's Il trovatore. The premiere took place at the Teatro San Carlo in Naples on 1 January 1839 as part of the Carnival Season. While not successful at the time, the opera was revived at La Scala in 1843 with twenty performances.

== Mercadante's "revolution" ==
When composing Elena da Feltre in 1838, Mercadante wrote to Francesco Florimo, laying out his ideas about how opera should be structured, following the "revolution" begun in his previous opera, Il giuramento:

"I have continued the revolution I began in Il giuramento: varied forms, cabalettas banished, crescendos out, vocal lines simplified, fewer repeats, more originality in the cadences, proper regard paid to the drama, orchestration rich but not so as to swamp the voices, no long solos in the ensembles (they only force the other parts to stand idle to the detriment of the action), not much bass drum, and a lot less brass band"

Elena seems to match up with the new concepts: greater involvement of the orchestra; fewer vocal "fireworks"; a more simple vocal line but more adventuresome harmonies and drama when compared to Il giuramento.

"Mercadante wanted to break free from any formulas developed by earlier composers, especially those of Rossini......The romantic hero is given to the bass-baritone voice, and the villain was played by the famous French tenor Nourrit. The story is tragic and violent, filled with romantic intrigues and twisted passions. The part of Elena is one of Mercadante's outstanding soprano vocal roles. Her opening romanza is one of the opera's finest highlights, although he later replaced it with an equally brilliant florid cavatina. The finale to the third act is another extremely strong number. The skillfully wrought ensemble reflects the dramatic tension of the script, as the denouement comes to its tragic conclusion."

In a 20th-century examination of Mercadante's operas by Patric Schmid, a critical comment noted:

A work of harmonic daring, subtlety and originally orchestrated, it suddenly makes sense of oft-quoted comparisons between Mercadante and Verdi. It has the overall coherence one looks for and finds in middle and late Verdi – a surprising anticipation, for Elena da Feltre dates from 1838, the year before Verdi's first opera.

== Performance history ==
Although not successful in its initial performance in Naples, "it achieved a considerable success in the rest of Italy and Europe where it was performed in several places between 1839 and 1860 with twenty performances at La Scala in the 1843 autumn season". It was performed at Covent Garden in London in January 1842 and in Dublin that July.

But, like most of Mercadante's operas, Elena da Feltre had disappeared from the repertory by the late 19th century. It was not until the mid-1900s that his operas began to see the light of day, and the revival of Elena did not take place until the October 1997 performances at the Wexford Festival in Ireland.

In 1999, with almost the same cast as had appeared at Wexford (including Monica Colonna in the title role), the opera was presented at the Teatro Rossini in Lugo, Italy, as part of the Lugo Opera Festival which has been held since the mid-1980s.

== Roles ==
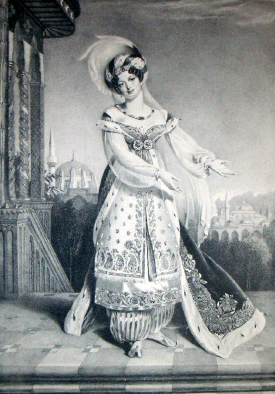
Giuseppina Ronzi de Begnis, who created the role of Elena da Feltre

Role	Voice type	Premiere Cast (Conductor: Nicola Festa)
Elena	soprano	Giuseppina Ronzi de Begnis
Imberga, Boemondo's daughter	soprano	Emilia Gandaglia
Ubaldo, Guido's friend; in love with Elena	tenor	Adolphe Nourrit
Boemondo, Minister of ruler Ezzelino	tenor	Anafesto Rossi
Guido, also in love with Elena	baritone	Paul Barroilhet
Sigifredo, Elena's father; a fugitive	bass	Pietro Gianni
Gualtiero, Sigifredo's servant	bass	Michele Benedetti
Knights, Ladies, Soldiers

== Synopsis ==
Time: 1250, during the war between the Guelphs and Ghibellines
Place: Feltre, Northern Italy, a Guelph town occupied by the Ghibellines under Ezzelino III da Romano

=== Act 1 ===
Scene 1: Ubaldo's house

Ubaldo's entourage cannot understand why he is so melancholic They leave when his friend Guido enters. Guido asks Ubaldo to help him: Boemondo (Ezzelino's henchman) wishes him to marry his daughter Imberga, but his heart belongs to another. Ubaldo points out that, if Guido defies Boemondo, his chances of regaining the position once held by his ancestors will be ruined. Guido, nevertheless, is prepared to renounce everything for love. He reveals that his lover is Elena, daughter of the outlawed Sigifredo, and that he plans to secretly leave the town with her. Ubaldo is aghast, as he realises why Elena has rejected his own declaration of love, but he conceals his agitation and agrees to help Guido, notwithstanding the likely rage of Ezzelino. Left alone, Ubaldo first considers betraying Guido to Ezzelino, but then resolves to abduct Elena instead.

Scene 2: Sigifredo's palace

Elena is overjoyed to hear that her father has escaped to nearby Belluno and excited at the prospect of marriage with Guido. Her servant Gualtiero tells her that a pilgrim who is approaching the palace is her father in disguise. Sigifredo and Elena embrace, and he tells her that Belluno has fallen to Ezzelino but that he has escaped so that he can die in his home town. He hides as Ubaldo enters to tell Elena that he and his men are about to carry her off. Sigifredo emerges to protect Elena, but Ubaldo's followers appear and drag Sigifredo away to prison. Ubaldo reluctantly goes with them, and Elena, left behind, falls into a faint.

=== Act 2 ===
The town hall

Boemondo tells Ubaldo that Sigifredo is now held in a secret location. Elena arrives. Boemondo says that Ubaldo will explain what she must do to save her father's life, and leaves. Ubaldo informs Elena that, if Sigifredo is not to be executed, Guido must marry Imberga, and she (Elena) must marry him. Ubaldo tells her that he loves her, but, when she repulses him, he reveals that a scaffold for her father's death is being built and that Sigifredo will die very soon if she does not consent to the marriage. She gives in, and they leave together.

Guido is brought in under guard and left alone. His sense of foreboding is confirmed when Boemondo tells him that Elena has betrayed him, and that this will be confirmed before long. Guido is distraught and longs for death.

Boemondo's adherents arrive to celebrate the fall of Belluno to Ezzelino. Boemondo announces that he will show mercy to his enemy Sigifredo's daughter if she will name someone as her protector. Guido and Ubaldo await her decision with trepidation. Provoked by Boemondo, she reluctantly names Ubaldo. The Act ends with Guido accusing her of treachery and asking Imberga to marry him, Ubaldo expressing his love for Elena, Boemondo and Imberga gloating, and Elena lamenting her fate.

=== Act 3 ===
Scene 1: Sigifredo's palace

Elena prays to her dead mother to allow her to die. Guido confronts her, but he is still not entirely convinced that she acted out of free will. Elena is about to explain everything when the bell for the execution of Sigifredo rings, and she re-asserts that she loves Ubaldo. Furious, Guido leaves as Elena again prays for death.

Scene 2: Ubaldo's house

Ubaldo has returned empty-handed from his mission to release Sigifredo from prison. He is upset that Boemondo has double-crossed Elena: Sigifredo had already been executed. He knows that he has lost Elena for ever, and he and his followers swear to abandon Boemondo and return to the Guelph cause.

Scene 3: Sigifredo's palace

Elena waits with Gualtiero for the overdue arrival of Ubaldo and Sigifredo. She sends Gualtiero to find out what has happened. The wedding procession for Guido and Imberga can be heard offstage, and Elena prays for Guido's happiness and her own death. Ubaldo and his men arrive as the offstage music becomes more joyous, and then Gualtiero returns with the news of Sigismondo's death. Elena has a vision of Sigifredo waiting for her in heaven and dies. Ubaldo laments her loss, and the chorus comment that an angel missing from heaven has now returned there.

== Recordings ==
Year	Cast (Elena, Imberga, Ubaldo, Boemondo, Guido)	Conductor, Opera House and Orchestra	Label
1970?	Orianna Santunione, Licia Falcone, Angelo Mori, Vito Tatone, Guido Guarnera	Armando Gatto; Orchestra Scarlatti di Napoli and the RAI Napoli Chorus	Audio CD: Voce; Cat: 121
1997	Monica Colonna, Elena Rossi, Cesare Catani, Luigi Petroni, Nicola Ulivieri	Maurizio Benini, National Symphony Orchestra of Ireland and Wexford Festival Opera Chorus (Recorded at performances at the Wexford Festival, October)	Audio CD: Marco Polo; Cat: 8.225064-65
