= Cantabile =

Musical term meaning "songlike"

Cantabile [kanˈtaːbile] is a term in music meaning to perform in a singing style. The word is taken from the Italian language and literally means "singable" or "songlike". In instrumental music, it is a particular style of playing designed to imitate the human voice. The German-language equivalent to cantabile is gesangvoll.

For 18th-century composers, cantabile is often synonymous with "cantando" (singing) and indicates a measured tempo and flexible, legato playing. For later composers, particularly in piano music, cantabile is the drawing out of one particular musical line against the accompaniment (compare counterpoint). Felix Mendelssohn's six books of Songs Without Words are short lyrical piano pieces with song-like melodies written between 1829 and 1845. A modern example is an instrumental piece by Harry James & His Orchestra, called "Trumpet Blues and Cantabile".

A cantabile movement, or simply a "cantabile", is the first half of a double aria, followed by a cabaletta. The cantabile movement would be slower and more free-form to contrast with the structured and generally faster cabaletta. Louis Spohr subtitled his violin concerto No. 8 "in moda d'una scena cantata," "in the manner of a sung [operatic] scene"; opera arias exerted a strong influence on the "singable" cantabile melodic line in Romantic writing for stringed instruments.
