= Nicola Martinucci =

Italian opera singer

Nicola Martinucci (born 28 March 1941) is an Italian opera singer, particularly noted for his performances in the spinto tenor of roles Calaf in Turandot, Radamès in Aida, and the title role in Andrea Chénier.

== Life and career ==
Martinucci was born in Taranto, Italy. He did not begin studying singing until his 20s. With the encouragement of Mario Del Monaco he studied in Milan with Marcello Del Monaco (Mario's brother) and with Sara Sforni. He made his debut in 1966 at the Teatro Nuovo in Milan as Manrico in Il Trovatore. In 1966 he had won the Viotti International Music Competition which led to further debuts in Italian opera houses. He later appeared La Scala from 1983 where he reprised the role of Manrico as well as singing Calaf, Radamès, Luigi in Il tabarro and Oronte in I Lombardi; La Fenice where he appeared from 1984 as Calaf, Radames, and Cavaradossi in Tosca; and the Arena di Verona, where he between 1982 and 1986 he sang Radamès, Calaf, and Andrea Chenier.

Outside his native Italy, Martinucci made his debut at the Teatro Colón in Buenos Aires in 1976 as Des Grieux in Manon Lescaut and appeared there again in 1977 as Calaf, in 1978 in the title role of Don Carlo, and in 1979 as Rodolfo in La bohème. He made his debut at London's Royal Opera House in 1985 as Dick Johnson in La fanciulla del West. His Metropolitan Opera debut came in 1988 when he sang Calaf with Ghena Dimitrova as Turandot. He went on to appear there until 1995 as Radamès, Dick Johnson, Andrea Chénier, and Manrico. His last performance at the Met was as Turiddu in Cavalleria rusticana.

In his later years, Martinucci has taught masterclasses in singing and served on the juries of several singing competitions. His daughter Leyla is also an opera singer. Several of Martinucci's performances have been released on video, including Aida and Turandot from the Arena di Verona.
