= Cabaletta =

Two-part musical form favored for arias

Cabaletta is a two-part musical form particularly favored for arias in 19th century Italian opera in the bel canto era until about the 1860s during which it was one of the era's most important elements. More properly, a cabaletta is a more animated section following the songlike cantabile. It often introduces a complication or intensification of emotion in the plot.

Some sources suggest that the word derives from the Italian cobola (couplet). Another theory suggests that it derives from the Italian cavallo (horse), a reference to the pulsating rhythm of a galloping horse which forms the accompaniment of many famous cabalettas.

The cabaletta was formed as part of an evolution from early 19th century arias containing two contrasting sections at different tempi within a single structure into more elaborate arias with musically distinct movements. The term itself was first defined in 1826 in Pietro Lichtenthal's Dizionario. It has a repetitive structure consisting of two stanzas followed by embellished variations. The cabaletta typically ends with a coda, often a very virtuosic one.

Classic examples include "Non più mesta" from La Cenerentola by Rossini (1817), "Vien diletto, è in ciel la luna" from I puritani by Bellini (1835), and "Di quella pira" from Verdi's Il trovatore (1853).

In later parlance, cabaletta came to refer to the fast final part of any operatic vocal ensemble, usually a duet, rather than just a solo aria. For example, the duet between Gilda and Rigoletto in Act 1, Scene 2 of Rigoletto ends with a relatively slow cabaletta, whereas the cabaletta for their duet in the finale of Act 2 is quite rousing.

The cabaletta is often used to convey strong emotions: overwhelming happiness (Linda's famous cabaletta "O luce di quest'anima" from Donizetti's Linda di Chamounix), great sorrow (Lucia's "Spargi d'amaro pianto" from Lucia di Lammermoor), or timeless love (Lindoro's short cabaletta from Rossini's L'italiana in Algeri). Rossini wrote at least one or even more cabalettas for all major characters in his operas. For example, L'italiana in Algeri contains two cabalettas for Lindoro, three cabalettas for Isabella, one cabaletta for Mustafa, and one for Taddeo. If the final parts of the ensembles are included, the total is almost sixteen cabalettas.

Giuseppe Verdi continued to adapt the cantabile–cabaletta formula to great emotional and dramatic effect, before largely abandoning it by 1862 as a solo piece with Don Carlo's "Egli è salvo" in "La forza del destino". A famous Verdian cabaletta appears in his 1853 La traviata in act 1. It follows Violetta's pensive "È strano! è strano...Ah fors'è lui" in which she considers that the man whom she has just met may be the one for her. But this leads by degrees to her resolve to remain "always free" in "Sempre libera", with its rapid and defiant pyrotechnics.

Verdi's 1846 Attila is regarded by contemporaneous critics as the "height of cabalettismo".
