= Saverio Mercadante =

Italian composer (1795–1870)

- Mercadante, portrait by Andrea Cefaly
- Born: Altamura, Italy
- Baptised: 17 September 1795
- Died: 17 December 1870 (aged 75); Naples, Italy
- Occupation: Composer

Giuseppe Saverio Raffaele Mercadante (baptised 17 September 1795 – 17 December 1870) was an Italian composer, particularly of operas. While Mercadante may not have attained the international celebrity of Vincenzo Bellini, Gaetano Donizetti or Gioachino Rossini beyond his own lifetime, he composed as prolifically as any of them, and his development of operatic structures, melodic styles and orchestration contributed significantly to the foundations upon which Giuseppe Verdi built his dramatic technique.

== Biography ==
=== Early years ===
Mercadante was born out of wedlock in Altamura, near Bari in Apulia; his precise date of birth has not been recorded, but he was baptised on 17 September 1795. Mercadante studied flute, violin and composition at the conservatory in Naples, and organized concerts among his compatriots. The opera composer Gioachino Rossini said to the conservatory Director, Niccolo Zingarelli, "My compliments, Maestro – your young pupil Mercadante begins where we finish". In 1817 he was made conductor of the college orchestra, composing a number of symphonies, and concertos for various instruments – including six for flute about 1818–1819, and whose autograph scores are in the Naples conservatory, where they were presumably first performed with him as soloist.

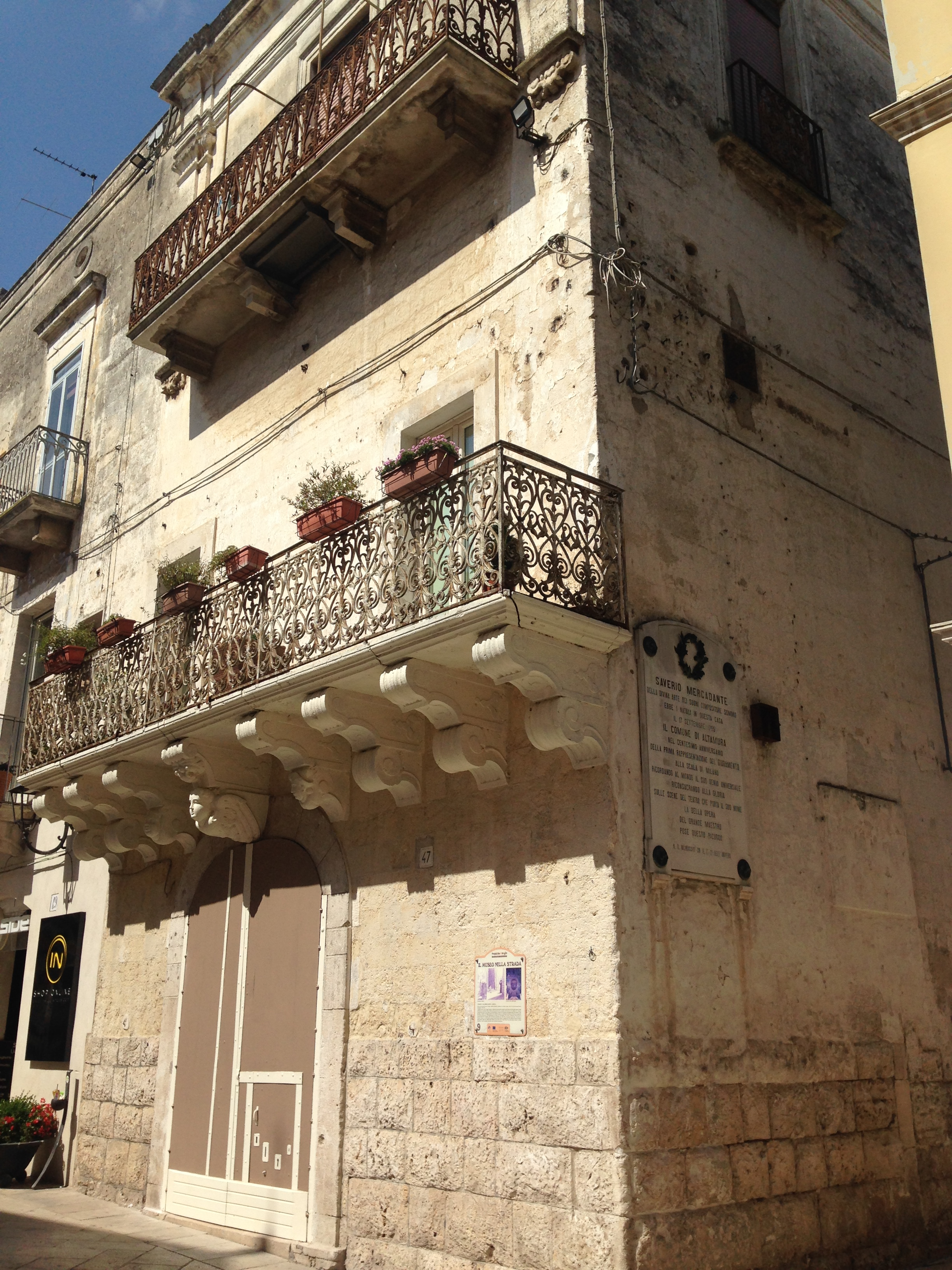
Mercadante's birthplace and house located on the street corso Federico II di Svevia, Altamura (the plaque dates back to Italy's fascist period)

The encouragement of Rossini led him to compose for the opera, where he won considerable success with his second such work (Violenza e Constanza), in 1820. His next three operas are more or less forgotten, but an abridged recording of Maria Stuarda, Regina di Scozia was issued by Opera Rara in 2006. His next opera, Elisa e Claudio, was a huge success, and had occasional revivals in the twentieth century, most recently by Wexford Festival Opera in 1988.

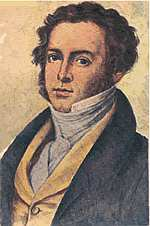
Mercadante

He worked for a time in Vienna, in Madrid, in Cádiz, and in Lisbon, but re-established himself in Italy in 1831. He was invited by Rossini to Paris in 1836, where he composed I briganti for four of the best-known singers of the time, Giulia Grisi, Giovanni Battista Rubini, Antonio Tamburini and Luigi Lablache, all of whom worked closely with Bellini. While there, he had the opportunity to hear operas by Meyerbeer and Halévy, which imparted a strong influence on him, especially the latter's La Juive. This influence took the form of greater stress on the dramatic side.

=== Return to Italy, 1831 ===
When Mercadante returned to Italy after living in Spain and Portugal, Donizetti's music reigned supreme in Naples, an ascendancy which did not end until censorship problems with the latter's Poliuto caused a final break. But Mercadante's style began to shift with the presentation of I Normanni a Parigi at the Teatro Regio in Turin in 1832: "It was with this score that Mercadante entered on the process of development in his musical dramaturgy which, in some aspects, actually presaged the arrival of Verdi, when he launched, from 1837 on, into master works of his artistic maturity: the so-called "reform operas".

The beginnings of the so-called "reform movement", of which Mercadante was part, arose from the publication of a manifesto by Giuseppe Mazzini which he wrote in 1836, the Filosofia della musica.

In the period after 1831 he composed some of his most important works. These included Il giuramento which was premiered at La Scala on 11 March 1837. One striking and innovative characteristic of this opera has been noted:

..it marks the first successful attempt in an Italian opera premiered in Italy of depriving the prima donna, or some other star singer, of her until-then inalienable right of having the stage to herself at the end. By doing this, Mercadante sounded what was to be the death knell of the age of bel canto.

Early in following year, while composing Elena da Feltre (which premiered in January 1839), Mercadante wrote to Francesco Florimo, laying out his ideas about how opera should be structured, following the "revolution" begun in his previous opera:

I have continued the revolution I began in Il giuramento: varied forms, cabalettas banished, crescendos out, vocal lines simplified, fewer repeats, more originality in the cadences, proper regard paid to the drama, orchestration rich but not so as to swamp the voices, no long solos in the ensembles (they only force the other parts to stand idle to the detriment of the action), not much bass drum, and a lot less brass band.

Elena da Feltre followed; one critic found much to praise in it:

A work of harmonic daring, subtlety and originally orchestrated, it suddenly makes sense of oft quoted comparisons between Mercadante and Verdi. It has the overall coherence one looks for and finds in middle and late Verdi – a surprising anticipation, for Elena da Feltre dates from 1838, the year before Verdi's first opera

These temporarily put him in the forefront of composers then active in Italy, although he was soon passed by Giovanni Pacini with Saffo and Giuseppe Verdi with several operas, especially Ernani.

=== Later works ===
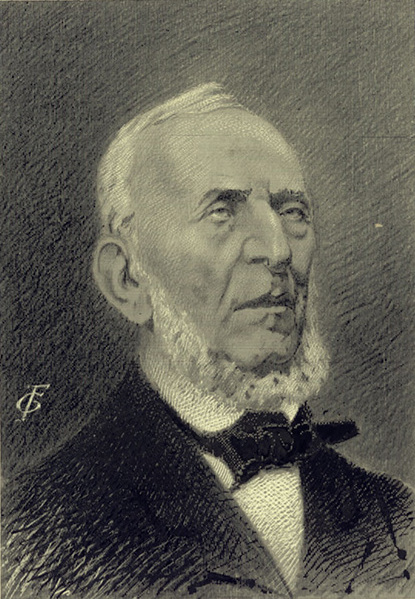
Portrait of Saverio Mercadante, composer (1836-1870).

Some of Mercadante's later works, especially Orazi e Curiazi, were also quite successful. Many performances of his operas were given throughout the nineteenth century and it has been noted that some of them received far more than did Verdi's early operas over the same period of time.

Throughout his life he generated more instrumental works than most of his contemporary composers of operas due to his lifelong preoccupation with orchestration, and, from 1840, his position as the Director of the Naples conservatory for the last thirty years of his life. From 1863 he was almost totally blind and dictated all his compositions.

In the decades after his death in Naples in 1870, his output was largely forgotten, but it has been occasionally revived and recorded since World War II, although it has yet to achieve anything like the present-day popularity of the most famous compositions by his slightly younger contemporaries: see Donizetti's compositions and Bellini's compositions.

The French soloist Jean-Pierre Rampal notably recorded several Mercadante concertos for flute and string orchestra, (Note: Not all the concertos are for string orchestra. Some are for larger ensembles. The Concerto in E minor, is, however, for flute and strings.) including the grand and romantic E minor concerto, which has since gained some popularity among concert flautists.

== Operas ==
Operas by Saverio Mercadante
Title	Genre	Acts	Libretto	Premiere		Notes
Title	Genre	Acts	Libretto	Date	Venue	Notes
L'apoteosi d'Ercole	dramma per musica	2 acts	Giovanni Schmidt	19 August 1819	Naples, Teatro San Carlo	
Violenza e costanza, ossia I falsi monetari	dramma per musica	2 acts	Andrea Leone Tottola	19 January 1820	Naples, Teatro Nuovo	Revised as: Il castello dei spiriti: Lisbon, 14 March 1825
Anacreonte in Samo	dramma per musica	2 acts	Giovanni Schmidt	1 August 1820	Naples, Teatro San Carlo	Based on Anacréon chez Polycrate by Jean Henri Guy.
Il geloso ravveduto	melodramma buffo	2 acts	Bartolomeo Signorini	October 1820	Rome, Teatro Valle	
Scipione in Cartagine	melodramma serio	2 acts	Jacopo Ferretti	26 December 1820	Rome, Teatro Argentina	
Maria Stuarda, regina di Scozia	dramma serio	2 acts	Gaetano Rossi	29 May 1821	Bologna, Teatro Comunale	
Elisa e Claudio, ossia L'amore protetto dall'amicizia	melodramma semiserio	2 acts	Luigi Romanelli	30 October 1821	Milan, Teatro alla Scala	Based on Rosella, ossia Amore e crudeltà by Filippo Casari
Andronico	melodramma tragico	2 acts	Giovanni Kreglianovich	26 December 1821	Venice, Teatro La Fenice	
Il posto abbandonato, ossia Adele ed Emerico	melodramma semiserio	2 acts	Felice Romani	21 September 1822	Milan, Teatro alla Scala	
Amleto	melodramma tragico	2 acts	Felice Romani	26 December 1822	Milan, Teatro alla Scala	Based on Shakespeare play Hamlet.
Alfonso ed Elisa	melodramma serio	2 acts		26 December 1822	Mantua, Teatro Nuovo	Based on Filippo by Alfieri; Revised as Aminta ed Argira for Reggio Emilia, Teatro Pubblico, 23 April 1823
Didone abbandonata	dramma per musica	2 acts	Andrea Leone Tottola	18 January 1823	Turin, Teatro Regio	Based on Metastasio
Gli sciti	dramma per musica	2 acts	Andrea Leone Tottola	18 March 1823	Naples, Teatro San Carlo	Based on Les scythes by Voltaire.
Costanzo ed Almeriska	dramma per musica	2 acts	Andrea Leone Tottola	22 November 1823	Naples, Teatro San Carlo	
Gli amici di Siracusa	melodramma eroico	2 acts	Jacopo Ferretti	7 February 1824	Rome, Teatro Argentina	Based on Plutarch.
Doralice	melodramma	2 acts		18 September 1824	Vienna, Kärntnertortheater	
Le nozze di Telemaco ed Antiope	azione lirica	7 acts	Calisto Bassi	5 November 1824	Vienna, Kärntnertortheater	Pastice, with music by other composers.
Il podestà di Burgos, ossia Il signore del villaggio	melodramma giocoso	2 acts	Calisto Bassi	20 November 1824	Vienna, Kärntnertortheater	Under the title of Il signore del villaggio given in Naples at Teatro del Fondo on 28 maggio 1825 (in Neapolitan dialect); Titled Eduardo ed Angelica, given in Naples at the Teatro del Fondo in 1828.
Nitocri	dramma per musica	2 acts	Lodovico Piossasco Feys	26 December 1824	Turin, Teatro Regio	With recitatives by Apostolo Zeno
Ipermestra	dramma tragico	2 acts	Luigi Ricciuti	29 December 1825	Naples, Teatro San Carlo	Based on Eschilo
Erode, ossia Marianna	dramma tragico	2 acts	Luigi Ricciuti	12 December 1824	Venice, Teatro La Fenice	Based on Voltaire
Caritea regina di Spagna, ossia La morte di Don Alfonso re di Portogallo (Donna Caritea)	melodramma serio	2 acts	Paolo Pola	21 February 1826	Venice, Teatro La Fenice	
Ezio	dramma per musica	2 acts	Pietro Metastasio	2 February 1827	Turin, Teatro Regio	
Il montanaro	melodramma comico	2 acts	Felice Romani	16 April 1827	Milan, Teatro alla Scala	Based on August Lafontaine
La testa di bronzo, ossia La capanna solitaria	melodramma eroicomico	2 acts	Felice Romani	3 December 1827	Lisbon, Teatro privato dei Baroni Quintella a Laranjeiras	
Adriano in Siria	dramma eroico	2 acts	Pietro Metastasio	24 February 1828	Lisbon, Teatro de São Carlos	
Gabriella di Vergy	dramma tragico	2 acts	Antonio Profumo	8 August 1828	Lisbon, Teatro de São Carlos	Based on Gabrielle de Vergy by Dormont de Belloy; Revised with a text by Emanuele Bidera for Genoa, Teatro Carlo Felice, 16 June 1832
La rappresaglia	melodramma buffo	2 acts	Cesare Sterbini	21 February 1829	Cadiz, Teatro Principal	
Don Chisciotte alle nozze di Gamaccio	melodramma giocoso	1 atto	Stefano Ferrero	10 February 1830	Cadiz, Teatro Principal	Based on Miguel de Cervantes
Francesca da Rimini	melodramma	2 acts	Felice Romani	1831		Composed for Madrid but probably not performed there.
Zaira	melodramma tragico	2 acts	Felice Romani	31 August 1831	Naples, Teatro San Carlo	Based on Voltaire
I normanni a Parigi	tragedia lirica	4 acts	Felice Romani	7 February 1832	Turin, Teatro Regio	
Ismalia, ossia Amore e morte	melodramma	3 acts	Felice Romani	27 October 1832	Milan, Teatro alla Scala	
Il conte di Essex	melodramma	3 acts	Felice Romani	10 March 1833	Milan, Teatro alla Scala	
Emma d'Antiochia	tragedia lirica	3 acts	Felice Romani	8 March 1834	Venice, Teatro La Fenice	
Uggero il danese	melodramma	4 acts	Felice Romani	11 August 1834	Bergamo, Teatro Riccardi	
La gioventù di Enrico V	melodramma	4 acts	Felice Romani	25 November 1834	Milan, Teatro alla Scala	In part based on Shakespeare
I due Figaro	melodramma buffo	2 acts	Felice Romani	26 January 1835	Madrid, Teatro Principe	Based on Les deux Figaro by Honoré-Antoine Richaud Martelly; Composed in 1826.
Francesca Donato, ossia Corinto distrutta	melodramma	3 acts	Felice Romani	14 February 1835	Turin, Teatro Regio	Based on Byron; Revised by Salvatore Cammarano for the Teatro San Carlo, Naples, 5 January 1845.
I briganti	melodramma	3 acts	Jacopo Crescini	22 March 1836	Paris, Théâtre-Italien	Based on Die Räuber by Schiller; Revised for Milan's Teatro alla Scala, 6 November 1837.
Il giuramento	melodramma	3 acts	Gaetano Rossi	11 March 1837	Milan, Teatro alla Scala	Under the title of Amore e dovere given in Rome in 1839.
Le due illustri rivali	melodramma	3 acts	Gaetano Rossi	10 March 1838	Venice, Teatro La Fenice	Revised for the Teatro alla Scala, 26 December 1839.
Elena da Feltre	dramma tragico	3 acts	Salvatore Cammarano	1 January 1839	Naples, Teatro San Carlo	Completed in the autumn of 1837.
Il bravo, ossia La veneziana	melodramma	3 acts	Gaetano Rossi	9 March 1839	Milan, Teatro alla Scala	Based on La vénitienne by Auguste Anicet-Bourgeois and The Bravo, a tale by James Fenimore Cooper.
La vestale	tragedia lirica	3 acts	Salvatore Cammarano	10 March 1840	Naples, Teatro San Carlo	Given under the title of Emilia in Rome in the autumn of 1842; As San Camillo given in Rome in 1851.
La solitaria delle Asturie, ossia La Spagna ricuperata	melodramma	5 acts	Felice Romani	12 March 1840	Venice, Teatro La Fenice	
Il proscritto	melodramma tragico	3 acts	Salvatore Cammarano	4 January 1842	Naples, Teatro San Carlo	Based on Le proscrit by F. Soulié.
Il reggente	dramma lirico	3 acts	Salvatore Cammarano	2 February 1843	Turin, Teatro Regio	Based on Gustave III ou Le bal masqué by Eugène Scribe; Revised with changes for Trieste, 11 November 1843.
Leonora	melodramma	4 acts	Marco D'Arienzo	5 December 1844	Naples, Teatro Nuovo	Based on Lenore by Gottfried August Bürger; Arranged as I cacciatori delle Alpi for Mantua in 1859.
Il Vascello de Gama	melodramma romantico	1 prologo e 3 acts	Salvatore Cammarano	6 March 1845	Naples, Teatro San Carlo	Based on Le naufrage de la Meduse by Desnoyers de Biéville.
Orazi e Curiazi	tragedia lirica	3 acts	Salvatore Cammarano	10 November 1846	Naples, Teatro San Carlo	Based on Horace by Pierre Corneille.
Il campo de’ crociati	melodramma tragico	4 acts	Francesco Maria Piave	26 December 1848	Milan, Teatro alla Scala	Revised for Teatro San Carlo, Naples, 29 October 1850.
Medea	tragedia lirica	3 acts	Salvatore Cammarano Felice Romani	1 March 1851	Naples, Teatro San Carlo	
Statira	tragedia lirica	3 acts	Domenico Bolognese	8 January 1853	Naples, Teatro San Carlo	Based on Olympie by Voltaire
Violetta	melodramma	4 acts	Marco D'Arienzo	10 January 1853	Naples, Teatro Nuovo	
Pelagio	tragedia lirica	4 acts	Marco D'Arienzo	12 February 1857	Naples, Teatro San Carlo	
Virginia	tragedia lirica	3 acts	Salvatore Cammarano	7 April 1866	Naples, Teatro San Carlo	Based on Alfieri; Composed in December 1849 to March 1850.
L'orfano di Brono, ossia Caterina dei Medici (Caterina di Brono)	melodramma	3 acts	Salvatore Cammarano			Incomplete; only the first act exists. Composed in 1869/1870
