= I briganti (Mercadante) =

Opera

Saverio Mercadante

I briganti is an opera (melodramma) in three acts by Saverio Mercadante, first performed on 22 March 1836 by the Théâtre-Italien in Paris, with an Italian libretto by Jacopo Crescini based on Schiller's Die Räuber. The lead roles were written for bass Luigi Lablache, tenor Giovanni Battista Rubini, baritone Antonio Tamburini and soprano Giulia Grisi. The opera did not do well in Paris, and the cast departed for London.

== Performance history ==
The opera was also performed in Italian at The King's Theatre in London with the same lead singers, beginning on 2 July 1836; at the Teatro San Benedetto in Venice on 30 September 1836; in Milan on 6 November 1837; in Cagliari, Sardinia, in the autumn of 1837; in Lisbon on 16 September 1838; at the Teatro San Carlo in Naples in the winter season of 1839; in Madrid on 12 December 1839; in Malta in 1840; and in Corfu in 1844. It was revived in Malta in 1886.

It was revived for the Rossini in Wildbad festival in 2012 and an audio recording was issued.

== Roles ==
Role	Voice type	Premiere cast, 22 March 1836
Massimiliano, Count of Moor, a Prince of the Blood Royal	bass	Luigi Lablache
Ermano, son of Massimiliano	tenor	Giovanni Battista Rubini
Corrado, son of Massimiliano	baritone	Antonio Tamburini
Amelia d'Edelreich, niece of Massimiliano	soprano	Giulia Grisi
Teresa, confidante of Amelia	mezzo-soprano	
Bertrand, a hermit	bass	
Roller, a friend of Ermano	tenor	
Chorus: Warriors, villagers, women, attendants, pages, domestics, brigands, etc.

Cast for the 1836 premieres in Paris and London

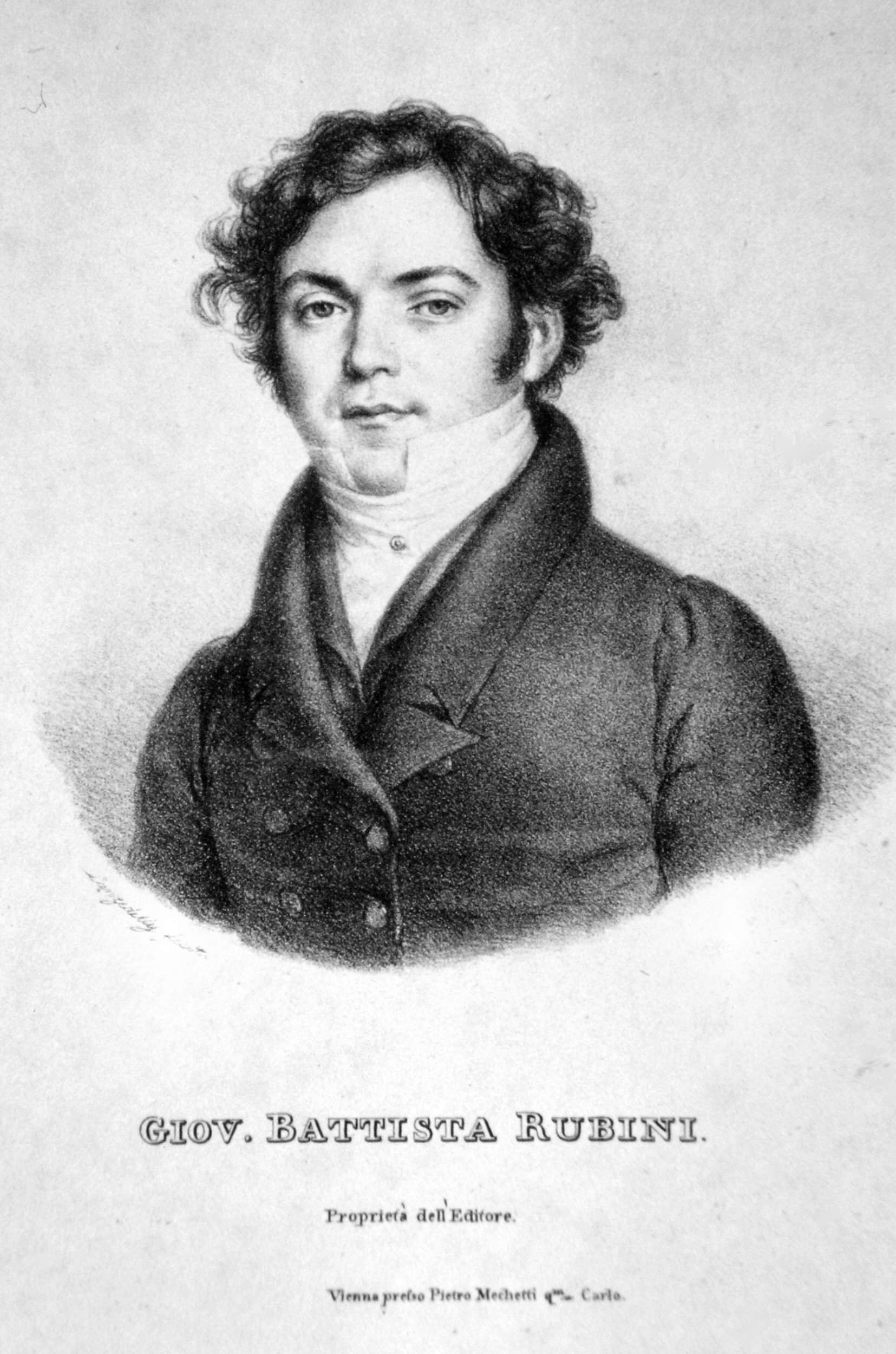
Giovanni Battista Rubini

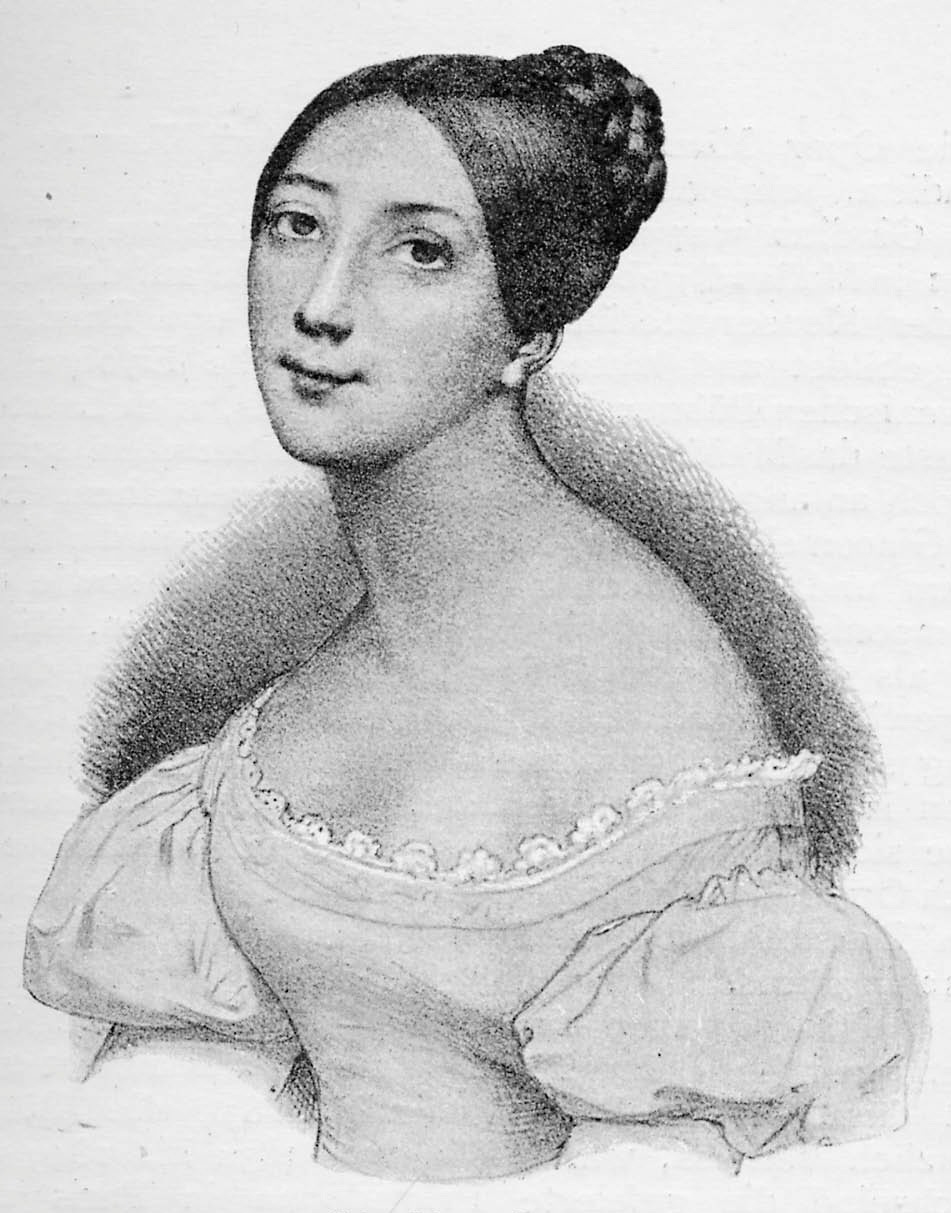
Giulia Grisi

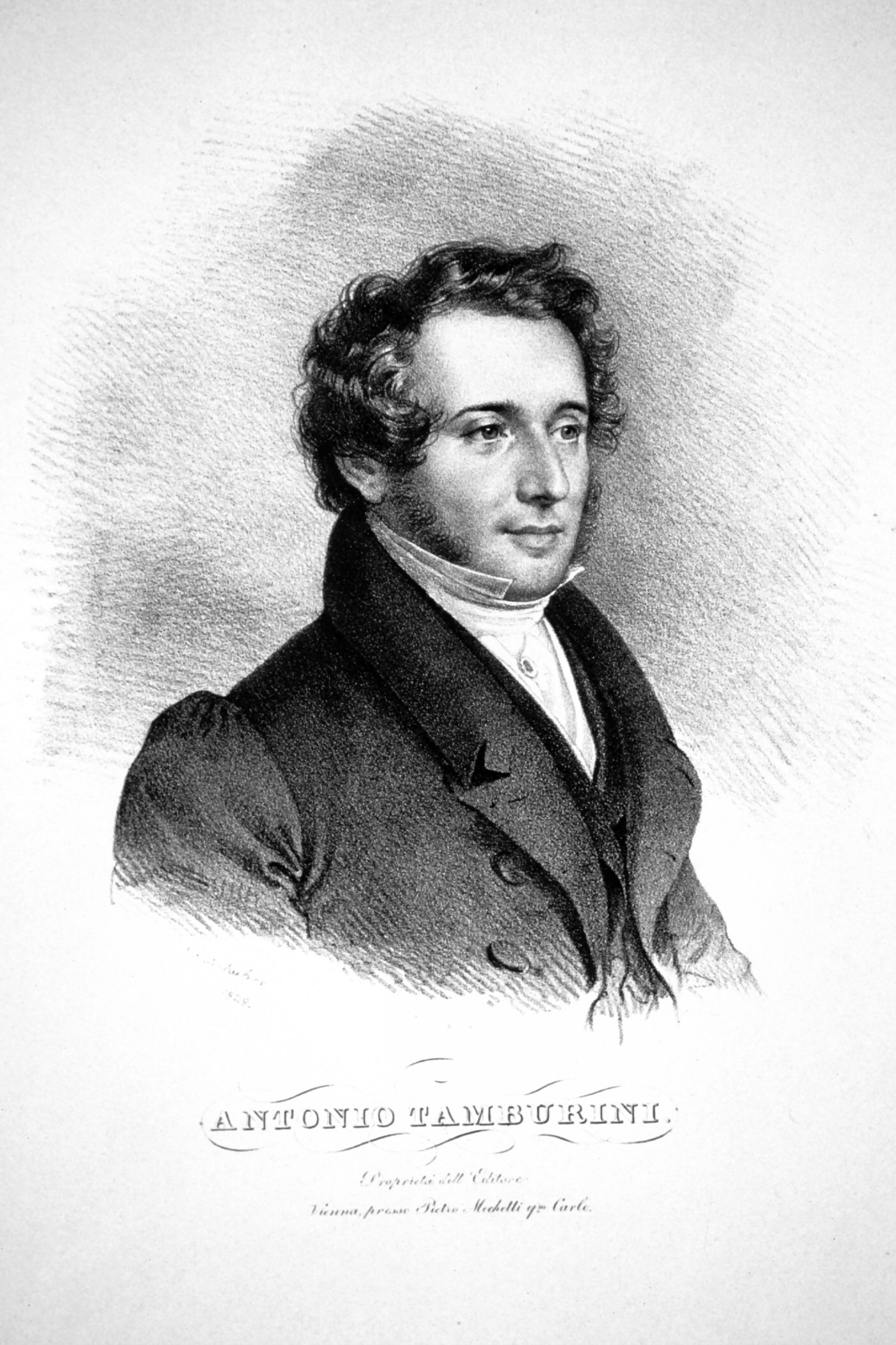
Antonio Tamburini

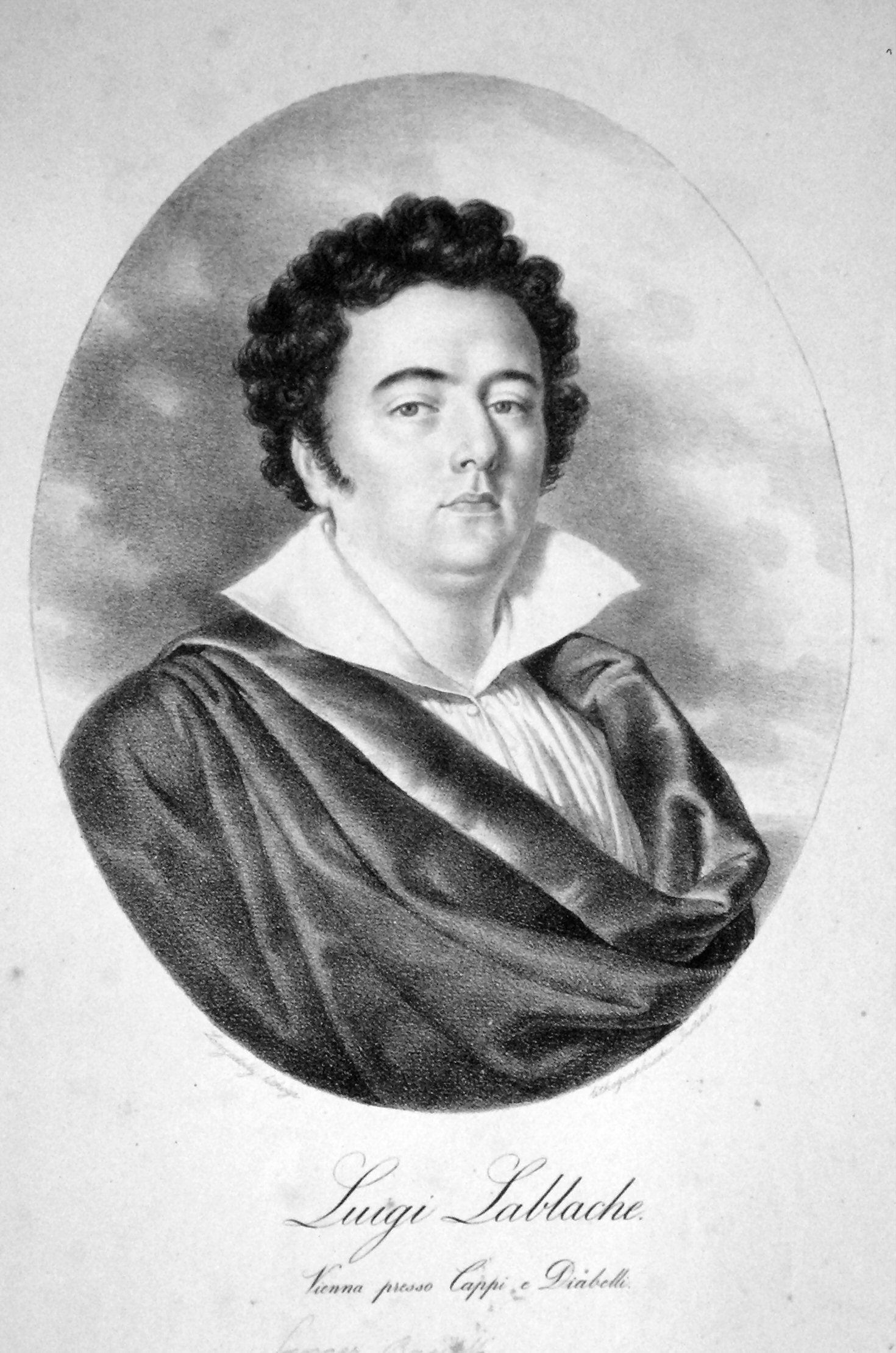
Luigi Lablache

== Recording ==
- 2012: Bruno Praticò (Massimiliano), Maxim Mironov (Ermano), Vittorio Prato (Corrado), Petya Ivanova (Amelia), Rosita Fiocco (Teresa). Virtuosi Brunensis, conducted by Antonino Fogliani. Live recording at Rossini in Wildbad on 14, 18 and 21 July 2012. Naxos Records.

== Bibliography ==
- Ashbrook, William (1982). Donizetti and His Operas. Cambridge: Cambridge University Press. ISBN 9780521235266.
- Loewenberg, Alfred (1978). Annals of Opera 1597–1940 (third edition, revised). Totowa, New Jersey: Rowman and Littlefield. ISBN 9780874718515.
- Marek, Dan H. (2013). Giovanni Battista Rubini and the Bel Canto Tenors: History and Technique. Lanham, MD: Scarecrow Press. ISBN 0810886685.
- Ripley, George; Dana, Charles Anderson, editors (1879). "Mercadante, Saverio", vol. 11, p. 398, in The American Cyclopaedia: A Popular Dictionary of General Knowledge, 2nd edition, revised. New York: D. Appleton.
- Rose, Michael (1992a). "I Briganti", vol. 1, p. 603, in The New Grove Dictionary of Opera, four volumes, edited by Stanley Sadie. London: Macmillan. ISBN 9781561592289.
- Rose, Michael (1992b). "Mercadante, (Giuseppe) Saverio (Raffaele)", vol. 3, pp. 334–339, in The New Grove Dictionary of Opera, four volumes, edited by Stanley Sadie. London: Macmillan. ISBN 9781561592289.
- Wittmann, Michael (2001). "Mercadante, (Giuseppe) Saverio (Raffaele)" in The New Grove Dictionary of Music and Musicians, 2nd edition, edited by Stanley Sadie. London: Macmillan. ISBN 9781561592395 (hardcover). OCLC 419285866 (eBook).
