= Honoré-Antoine Richaud Martelly =

French dramatist

Honoré-Antoine Richaud Martelly (Aix, Bouches-du-Rhône 1751 - Marseille, 8 July 1817) was a French dramatist. He is best remembered for his comedy Les deux Figaro (1795).
