= Il giuramento =

Opera by Saverio Mercadante

Saverio Mercadante

Il giuramento (The Oath) is an opera in three acts by Italian composer Saverio Mercadante. The libretto, by Gaetano Rossi, is based on Victor Hugo's 1835 play Angelo, Tyrant of Padua. (This is the same source as Arrigo Boito, under the pseudonym of Tobia Gorrio, was to use for his libretto for Amilcare Ponchielli's La Gioconda).

The opera was first performed at La Scala, Milan, on 11 March 1837 and was "quickly taken up by other theatres throughout Italy". Within a year, it was staged in Vienna (April 1838) and later appeared in many European cities including London (Her Majesty's Theatre 27 June 1840) and Paris (1858) and in New York (February 1848).

As has been noted by Colleen Fay, there were aspects of this work which moved Italian opera in a new direction:

Its taut dramatic structure and vivid musical scene-painting set it apart from the operas of his day ... Not only do we hear in its music a reliable Italian lyricism, but also the early moves away from ornamentation for its own sake. Mercadante uses the orchestra not as a pale accompaniment to dramatic action, but as a full partner in the drama.

== Performance history ==
=== 19th century ===
After the mid-19th century, the opera dropped in popularity and by 1900 it had, “virtually disappeared”. It has been noted that before 1900 the opera received 400 performances and Mercadante's La vestale 150 performances compared to the combined total of approximately 90 performances for Verdi's Giovanna d'Arco, Don Carlo (in all its versions), and Aroldo.

=== 20th century and beyond ===
Occasional performances have been given in modern times, beginning with revivals in the 1950s.

==== 1970s ====
The opera was presented at the Festival dei Due Mondi in Spoleto in June 1970 with Thomas Schippers conducting. German conductor Gerd Albrecht gave a concert performance in Berlin in 1974 and three further performances in 1979, one of which was recorded. Three performances took place at the Vienna State Opera in September 1979 also conducted by Gerd Albrecht.

==== 1980s ====
It was given at the Festival della Valle d'Itria in Martina Franca, Italy, in the summer of 1984, conducted by Bruno Campanella; this too was recorded and made available on CD. There were four staged performances given by the Angers-Nantes Opéra in France in November 1993, conducted by Giuliano Carella. It was also performed at the Wexford Festival Opera in December 2002 under Paolo Arrivabeni. The Washington Concert Opera in the US capital presented a concert version in May 2009 with Antony Walker conducting.

== Roles ==
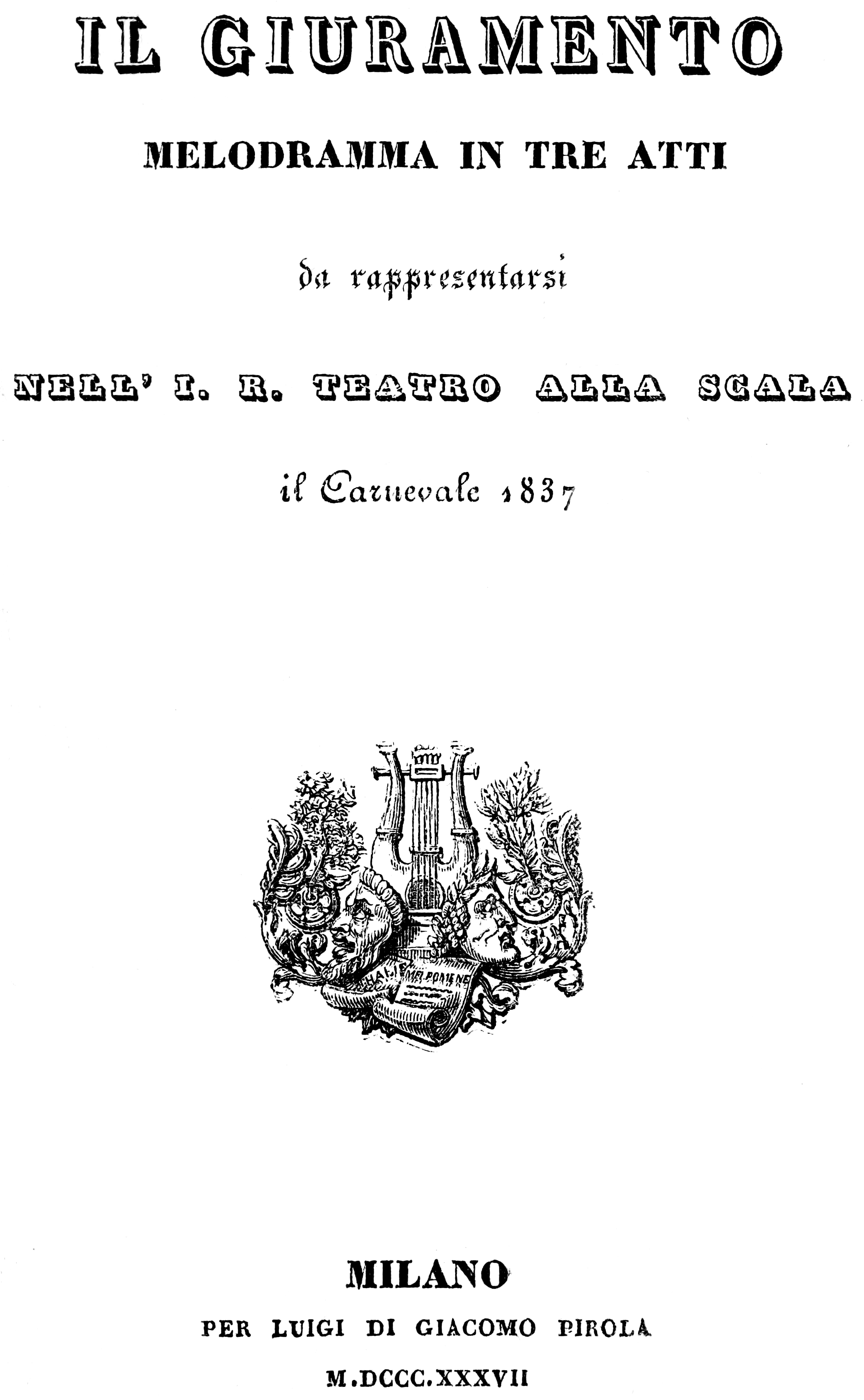
Title page of the libretto, 1837

Roles, voice types, premiere cast
Role	Voice type	Premiere cast, 11 March 1837 Conductor: Eugenio Cavallini
Elaisa	soprano	Sofia Dall'Oca-Schoberlechner
Manfredo, Bianca's husband, but smitten with Elaisa	baritone	Giovanni Orazio Cartagenova
Bianca, Manfredo's wife, but secretly in love with Viscardo	contralto	Marietta Brambilla
Viscardo di Benevento, Elaisa's rescuer	tenor	Francesco Pedrazzi
Brunoro, Manfredo's secretary	tenor	Giuseppe Vaschetti
Isaura	soprano	Angela Carolina Pochini

== Synopsis ==
Setting: Syracuse
Time: 14th century

Act 1
Bianca has been married against her will to Count Manfredo, although she is secretly in love with an unknown knight. Elaisa, a young woman in search of the daughter of her benefactor, and Viscardo arrive in the city. The disgraced courtier Brunoro discovers that Viscardo is the knight loved by Bianca. He tells Elaisa in order to make her jealous but she finds out that Bianca was the very woman she had been looking for.
Act 2
The count suspects Bianca of infidelity and locks her in the family tomb, intending to poison her. But Elaisa, who is loved by the count, manages to substitute a strong narcotic for the poison.
Act 3
Viscardo believes that Elaisa is responsible for Bianca's death and stabs her just as Bianca wakes from her deep sleep.

== Recordings ==
Year	Cast: Manfredo, Bianca, Elaisa, Viscardo	Conductor, opera house and orchestra	Label
1951	Rolando Panerai, Miriam Pirazzini, Maria Vitale, Amedeo Berdini	Alfredo Simonetto, Chorus and Orchestra della RAI di Milano	CD: Myto; Cat: MCD 905 32
1975	Lajos Miller, Benedetta Pecchioli, Teresa Żylis-Gara, Michele Molese	Maurizio Arena, Orchestra and chorus of Radio France	CD: Rodolphe; Cat: RPC 32417–32418
1979	Robert Kerns, Agnes Baltsa, Mara Zampieri, Plácido Domingo	Gerd Albrecht, Orchestra and chorus of the Vienna State Opera (Recording of a concert performance in Vienna, 9 September)	CD: Orfeo d'Or; Cat: C 680 062 1 House of Opera; Cat: CDBB 335
1993	Marc Barrard, Martine Olmeda, Giovanna de Liso, Giuseppe Morino	Giuliano Carella, Orchestre national des Pays de la Loire and chorus of the Angers-Nantes Opéra, (A recording of a production given by the Angers-Nantes Opera)	CD: Nuova Era, Cat: 7179/80
