= Una follia =

Opera by Gaetano Donizetti

- Farsa by Gaetano Donizetti
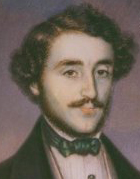
- Donizetti as a young man
- Librettist: Bartolomeo Merelli
- Language: Italian
- Based on: Der Graf von Burgund by August von Kotzebue
- Premiere: 15 December 1818; Teatro San Luca in Venice

Una follia is a farsa in one act by composer Gaetano Donizetti. The work premiered on 15 December 1818 at the Teatro San Luca in Venice. The opera uses the same Italian-language libretto by Bartolomeo Merelli after August von Kotzebue's Der Graf von Burgund that Donizetti used for his Enrico di Borgogna a month earlier, but with different music. It was given one performance and "never performed again, and its score has never been found."

== Roles ==
Role	Voice type	Premiere Cast, 15 December 1818 (Conductor:)
Brunone	baritone	Giuseppe Fioravanti
Elisa	mezzo-soprano	Adelina Catalani
Enrico	contralto	Fanny Eckerlin
Geltrude	soprano	Adelaide Cassago
Gilberto	bass	Andrea Verni
Nicola	bass	Pietro Verducci
Pietro	tenor	Giuseppe Fusconi
Guido	tenor	Giuseppe Eliodoro Spech
Bruno	bass	Pietro Verducci
