= Fanny Eckerlin =

Italian opera singer (1802–1842)

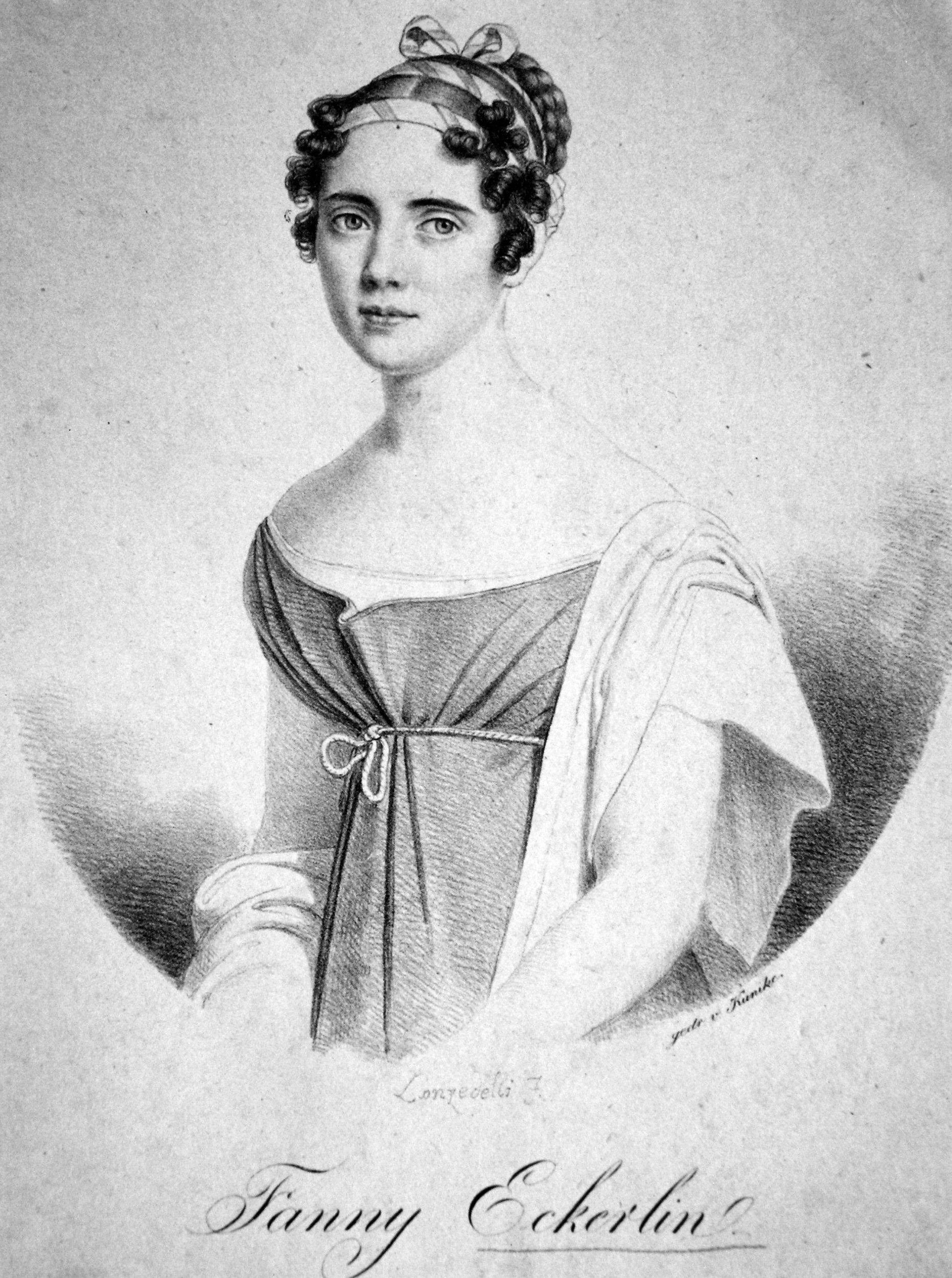
- Lithographic portrait of Fanny Eckerlin, c. 1820
- Born: 1802; Milan, Italy
- Died: 1842 (aged 39–40); Milan, Italy
- Education: Milan Conservatory
- Occupation: Singer
- Relatives: Teresa Pichler (aunt); Vincenzo Monti (uncle); Cajo Eckerlin (brother)

Fanny Eckerlin (1802–1842) was an Italian mezzo-soprano who also sang contralto roles. During her career she was highly regarded, drawing favorable comparisons to Benedetta Rosmunda Pisaroni, but today she is remembered, if at all, for her association with the early career of Gaetano Donizetti, including creating the title role in his first publicly-performed opera, Enrico di Borgogna.

== Biography ==
Eckerlin's father was a Napoleonic official of Polish origin; her mother, an Italian, was a sister of the actress Teresa Pichler, whose husband was the poet Vincenzo Monti. A native of Milan, she studied at the Milan Conservatory under David Banderali. She is said to have made her debut at the age of sixteen in 1818 in L'Italiana in Algeri of Gioacchino Rossini at the Teatro San Benedetto in Venice, but she is listed in the printed libretto as having sung Achille in Ifigenia in Aulide by Simone Mayr in Florence during the spring of 1817. It was later in 1818, on 14 November, that she created the title role of Donizetti's Enrico di Borgogna at the Teatro San Luca, also in Venice. Her performance on this occasion was overshadowed by the indisposition, through stage fright, of the prima donna, Adelina Catalani, and the surviving review from Nuovo Osservatore Veneziano makes almost no mention of her appearance.

On 15 December of the following month, also at the Teatro San Luca, Eckerlin created the role of Enrico in Donizetti's Una follia, a now-lost opera buffa based on the same libretto as the previous work. She created one further role for Donizetti, that of Serafina in his comedy Le nozze in villa. That opera premiered at the Teatro Vecchio in Mantua during the carnival season of 1820–1821. It was not a success; Bartolomeo Merelli, the librettist, later blamed Eckerlin in part for its failure, writing in his Cenni biografici that the piece had faltered due to the "caprices and ill will of several of the singers, especially the prima donna". William Ashbrook has speculated on this last point that Eckerlin may have been chafing at the restrictions of her contract, as by this time she had already appeared with some success at La Scala, where she had debuted in La gazza ladra during the 1817–18 season, and where in 1820 she originated the role of Susanna in I due Figaro by Michele Carafa.

During Eckerlin's career she spent several seasons at the Teatro Italiano in Barcelona, where a claque of her followers operated, and where she won many favorable notices for her work before accepting a contract with the Salle Favart in Paris. She was a noted interpreter of Rossini, and during his tenure at the helm of the Théâtre Italien she appeared there in a number of roles, among them creating Angelina in La cenerentola at its Paris premiere alongside Giovanni Battista Rubini and Fanny Tacchinardi Persiani. At the same theater she appeared as Arsace in Semiramide in 1832 when Giulia Grisi made her Paris debut in the title role.

Eckerlin's career also took her to the Teatro Regio in Turin and the Teatro di San Carlo in Naples, at both of which she appeared in leading roles; notably, at the former, she originated the role of Enea in Didone abbandonata by Saverio Mercadante in 1823. She sang, too, in Vienna, where with Domenico Barbaja's company in 1822 she created the role of Emma in the local premiere of Rossini's Zelmira, a performance for which, for her, the composer wrote a new aria, "Ciel pietoso, ciel clemente", to be inserted into the second act. In 1823 she sang Caterina in Il falegname di Livonia by Giovanni Pacini at the Teatro del Fondo in Naples. At the Teatro Alfieri, Florence, she was Enea in Mayr's La Didone in 1830; later that same year she sang Romeo in Giulietta e Romeo by Nicola Vaccai at the Teatro Apollo in Rome. She appeared also in Madrid and London during her career. Eckerlin ended her stage career in 1840, dying two years later in the city of her birth.

Eckerlin had an extensive range, and was noted as well for her coloratura. She was said to possess "a sweet contralto", and one critic, writing in the Gazetta di Milano of 4 February 1817, spoke of her as having "fine means and no ordinary taste in singing." Her younger brother was the bass Cajo Eckerlin.
