= Angelica Catalani =

Italian opera singer

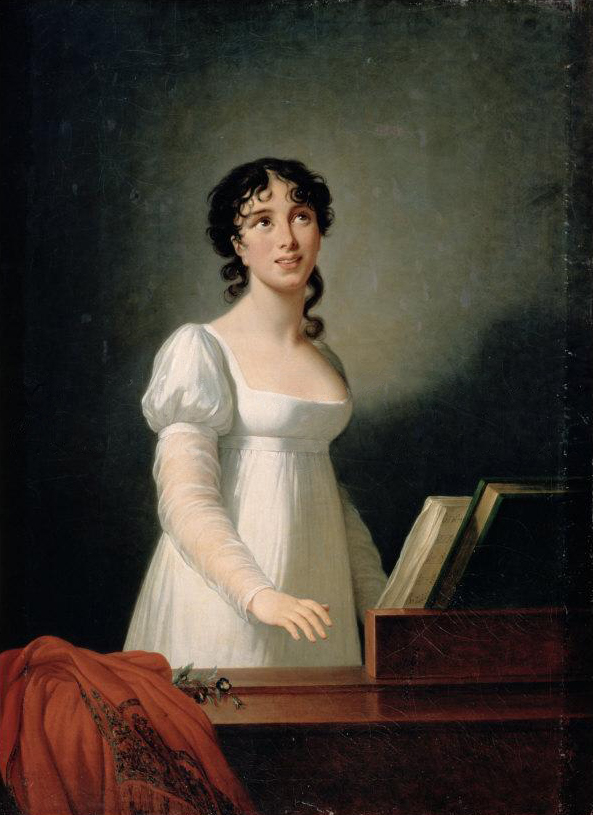
Angelica Catalani Élisabeth Vigée Le Brun, 1806

Angelica Catalani (10 May 1780 – 12 June 1849) was an Italian opera singer, the daughter of a tradesman. Her greatest gift was her voice, a dramatic soprano of nearly three octaves in range. Its unsurpassed power and flexibility made her one of the greatest bravura singers of all time. She also worked as a singing teacher. Her pupils included Laure Cinti-Damoreau and Fanny Corri-Paltoni.

== Biography ==
Catalani was born on 10 May 1780, at Sinigaglia, where her father was a tradesman. At about the age of 12, she was sent to the convent of Santa Lucia at Gubbio, near Rome, where her voice soon became a great attraction.

On leaving the convent, into which she had been introduced by the Cardinal Onorati, she found herself, owing to the sudden impoverishment of her parents, compelled to perform in public. Her musical education had been but ill cared for in the convent, where she passed three years; and she had contracted bad tricks of vocalisation, which she never entirely overcame, even after hearing such great models as Luigi Marchesi and Girolamo Crescentini. One of her faults was that she could never execute certain passages without a very perceptible oscillation of the lower jaw, which made them, instead of being even and smooth, sound like a succession of staccato passages on the violin. In spite of this her singing had a charm which has scarcely ever been equalled, and her very first steps in a theatrical career were marked by the most extraordinary success. When she began, the favourite style was that of expressive and pathetic song, and in this she never produced the effect which she subsequently made in bravura. Thus at Paris she failed comparatively in a tender song of Piccini's, 'Se'l ciel mi divide,' though shortly after, she created the greatest enthusiasm by her 'Son regina,' by an air of Rode's with variations, concerti for the voice, and other pieces of the most florid execution.

In 1795, at the age of 16, she obtained her first engagement at La Fenice at Venice, and made her début as Lodoiska in the opera of that name by Mayer. Her face, figure, and voice, assured her success, a success which grew day by day, and lasted for nearly thirty years. In the season of 1798, she sang at Leghorn with Crivelli, Marchesi, and Mrs. Billington; the year after, at La Pergola in Florence, in Nasolini's 'Monima e Mitridate'; and, in 1801, at Milan, in the 'Clitemnestra' of Zingarelli, and Nasolini's 'Baccanali.' In these early efforts her effect was not due to method or skill; it was her superb voice that carried all before her. From Milan she went to Florence, Trieste, Rome, and Naples, exciting everywhere the same astonishment and admiration.

Her reputation now reached the ears of the Prince Regent of Portugal, who engaged her, with Elisabetta Gafforini and Crescentini, to sing at the Italian Opera there, and she arrived about the end of the year 1804. Her salary was 24,000 cruzados (£3,000) - the equivalent of £292,458.41 in 2018.

Some writers have said that she derived very great advantage from the instruction of Crescentini, which, indeed, seems more than likely; but Fétis, on the authority of Crescentini himself, contradicts this statement categorically, affirming that Crescentini told him that he had endeavoured to give her a little advice, which she had seemed incapable of understanding. During her stay in Portugal, Catalani made the acquaintance of Paul Valabrègue, the French attaché at Lisbon and former French captain, and they married in 1804. Her husband, appears to have had no ideas beyond helping his talented wife to gain the utmost possible amount of money on every occasion, and spending it for her afterwards. From their marriage dates one of the worst of the many speculations that have been based on the capital of a grand voice and great personal charm. They went first to Madrid, and then to Paris, where she sang only in concerts, but where she gained even more fame than before.

On October 26, 1805, Mme. Catalani signed her first engagement (in the possession of the writer) with F. Goold and W. Taylor, manager and proprietors of the King's Theatre in the Haymarket, for the season from September 15, 1806, to August 1807, at a salary of £2,000 sterling, with 'a further sum of £100 sterling to defray the expenses of her journey to London,' and also 'one Benefit Night free of expense in the month of March, at which a new opera shall be performed.' Before crossing, however, she gave concerts at Madrid and Paris, by which she gained large sums of money, and created a deep impression; indeed, Napoleon offered her an engagement from which she had some difficulty in escaping, in order to fulfil that at the King's Theatre.

At the moment of her arrival in London, Grassini and Mrs. Billington had just retired; and, as Lord Mount Edgcumbe says,

the great, the far-famed Catalani supplied the place of both, and for many years reigned alone, for she would bear no rival, nor any singer sufficiently good to divide the applause...It is well known, that her voice is of a most uncommon quality, and capable of exertions almost supernatural. Her throat seems endued (as has been remarked by medical men) with a power of expansion and muscular motion by no means usual, and when she throws out all her voice to the utmost, it has a volume and strength that are quite surprising; while its agility in divisions, running up and down the scale in semi-tones, and its compass in jumping over two octaves at once, are equally astonishing. It were to be wished,... that she was less lavish in the display of these wonderful powers, and sought to please more than to surprise; but her taste is vicious, her excessive love of ornament spoiling every simple air, and her greatest delight (indeed her chief merit) being in songs of a bold and spirited character, where much is left to her discretion (or indiscretion), without being confined by the accompaniment, but in which she can indulge in ad libitum passages with a luxuriance and redundancy no other singer ever possessed, or if possessing ever practised, and which she carries to a fantastical excess.

The performance received a consistent consensus among contemporary critics, while the general public was strongly influenced by her vocal abilities. Her debut took place on December 15, 1806, in the opera Semiramide by Portogallo, a work composed specifically for her performance.

She appeared also in 'Mitridate,' 'Elfrida,' and most unwillingly in 'La Clemenza di Tito,' for the strict time required in Mozart's music, and the importance of the accompaniments, were not suited to her style. She was, however, the singer who introduced to the English stage his 'Nozze di Figaro,' in which she played Susanna to admiration. In the 'Orazi' she performed the part of the first soprano, Curiazio, that of the first woman being filled by Ferlendis. In 'Didone' she caused the rôle of Enea to be sung by Madame Dussek, who was entirely unfitted for it; and, in another opera, she made Madame Dussek act the first woman's part, choosing for herself that of the primo uomo. Subsequently, she assumed also the place of prima buffa, and succeeded equally well in that line; singing with greater simplicity and ease, she was by some preferred in comic opera. Her face and figure suited both styles; for her handsome countenance was capable of great varieties of expression. Her gains soon became enormous. She was the great attraction of Goold's management, and her engagements entailed on the theatre an expense surpassing anything before experienced.

Mr. Waters, in a pamphlet which he published, gives the total amount received by her from the theatre in 1807, including benefits, at £5,000, and her total profits that year, with concerts, provincial tour, etc., at £16,700,—an immense sum to be received in such a period for the services of a single artist. That she sometimes found a difficulty in getting payment is not surprising, especially from such a manager as Taylor. Ebers relates that, on one occasion, she refused to sing unless a debt of £1,000 due to her was paid; and that he gave security for this, of which he had ultimately to pay every farthing. She received as much as 200 guineas for singing 'God save the King' and 'Rule Britannia,' and at a single festival £2,000. Had she practised the least economy she must have amassed a very great fortune; but this she did not do. It is said, for example, that the consumption of beer by her servants during a single year amounted to £103. More serious causes, however, contributed to dissipate these riches as fast as she gained them; for her husband was passionately addicted to gambling, and lost vast sums at play. She remained seven years in England, where she finally succeeded in becoming the only singer of eminence, and led in both lines; but one singer does not constitute an opera, though Valabrègue used to say 'Ma femme et quatre ou cinq poupées,—voilà tout ce qu'il faut.' Neither would her disposition endure the possibility of rivalry, nor the extravagance of her increasing demands allow any manager to engage other singers.

She quit the theatre at the end of the season of 1813, having first endeavoured (unsuccessfully) to purchase it, and so become sole proprietor, sole manager, and sole singer. After leaving this stage, she for many years never trod any other, except at Paris, where she obtained the management of the Italian opera, with a subvention of 160,000 francs; but the undertaking was not fortunate. On the return of Napoleon, in 1815, she left Paris, going first to Hamburg, and afterwards to Denmark and Sweden, and exciting everywhere the wildest admiration and enthusiasm. She returned to France, after the Restoration, by the Netherlands and Belgium. On her arrival at Paris, she resumed the direction of the Théâtre Italian, and established the same ruinous system which had destroyed, for a time, opera in London. Every expense of scenery, orchestra, and chorus, was curtailed, and every singer of worth excluded, in order that the entire receipts might go, with the subvention, into the purse of Valabrègue. This was not all. To suit this state of things the operas were arranged in such a manner that little of the original but the name remained. The rest consisted of variations by Rode, and similar things, with the famous 'Son regina,' interpolated in place of the concerted pieces and songs which had been cut out. In May 1816, Catalani left her opera in the hands of managers, and went to Munich to give some concerts and representations. Thence she proceeded to Italy, and only returned to Paris in August 1817.

In the next April she left her opera entirely, and resumed her wanderings. Having engaged Mme. Gail to accompany her, as Pucitta had done in London and Paris, she started for Vienna. No sooner had they arrived than she quarrelled with her companion, who returned to Paris. Catalani continued her tour alone, and it lasted nearly ten years. In 1824, she returned to London, performing a certain number of nights with no regular engagement. She reappeared in 'Il Nuovo Fanatico per la Musica,' an opera by Mayer, arranged for her. 'Her powers were undiminished, her taste unimproved.' She next continued her wanderings on the continent. In 1826, an attempt was made by Ebers to engage her, but the terms proposed by her were so exorbitant that it was impossible to consider them seriously. Her voice was, however, no longer what it had been, especially in the highest part of her register. Though still beautiful, flexible, and strong, it was losing gradually a little of these qualities. In turn she visited Germany, Italy, and Paris once more, where she sang without success; then Poland, Russia, and the north of Germany again in 1827. About this time she sang for the last time at Berlin, and resolved to cease singing in public.

But she revisited England once more in 1828, and sang at the York Festival. Lord Mount Edgcumbe heard her the same year at Plymouth, and describes her as having lost, perhaps, a little in voice, but gained more in expression: as electrifying an audience with her 'Rule Britannia;' and as still handsome, though somewhat stout. After a time, she retired to a villa which she had bought in the neighbourhood of Florence. On the stage, she is described as having always produced an unnatural impression, owing to an invincible nervousness, which made her exaggerate the effects she wished to create. She said herself, that it was as painful to her to sing in the theatre as it was delightful to perform at a concert.

She never lost her simplicity and purity of manners, nor her piety, modesty, and generosity. Her charitable deeds were innumerable, and the amount of money earned by her in concerts for such purposes alone has been estimated at 2,000,000 francs. At her residence she founded a school of singing for young girls.

Catalani died of cholera at Paris, June 12, 1849.

Catalani's sister-in-law, Adelina, was also a soprano, though of far less note. She was known variously as la cognate della famosa and la Catalani juniore to distinguish her from her far better-known relative.

== Publications ==
- Henry Sutherland Edwards, The Prima Donna: Her History and Surroundings from the Seventeenth to the Nineteenth Century, volume i (two volumes, London, 1888)
- George T. Ferris, Great Singers (New York, 1893)
- Ellen Creathorne Clayton, afterwards Mrs. Needham, Queens of Song (London, 1863)
- Henry Charles Lahee, Famous Singers of To-Day and Yesterday (Boston, 1900)
