= Viktorija Miškūnaitė =

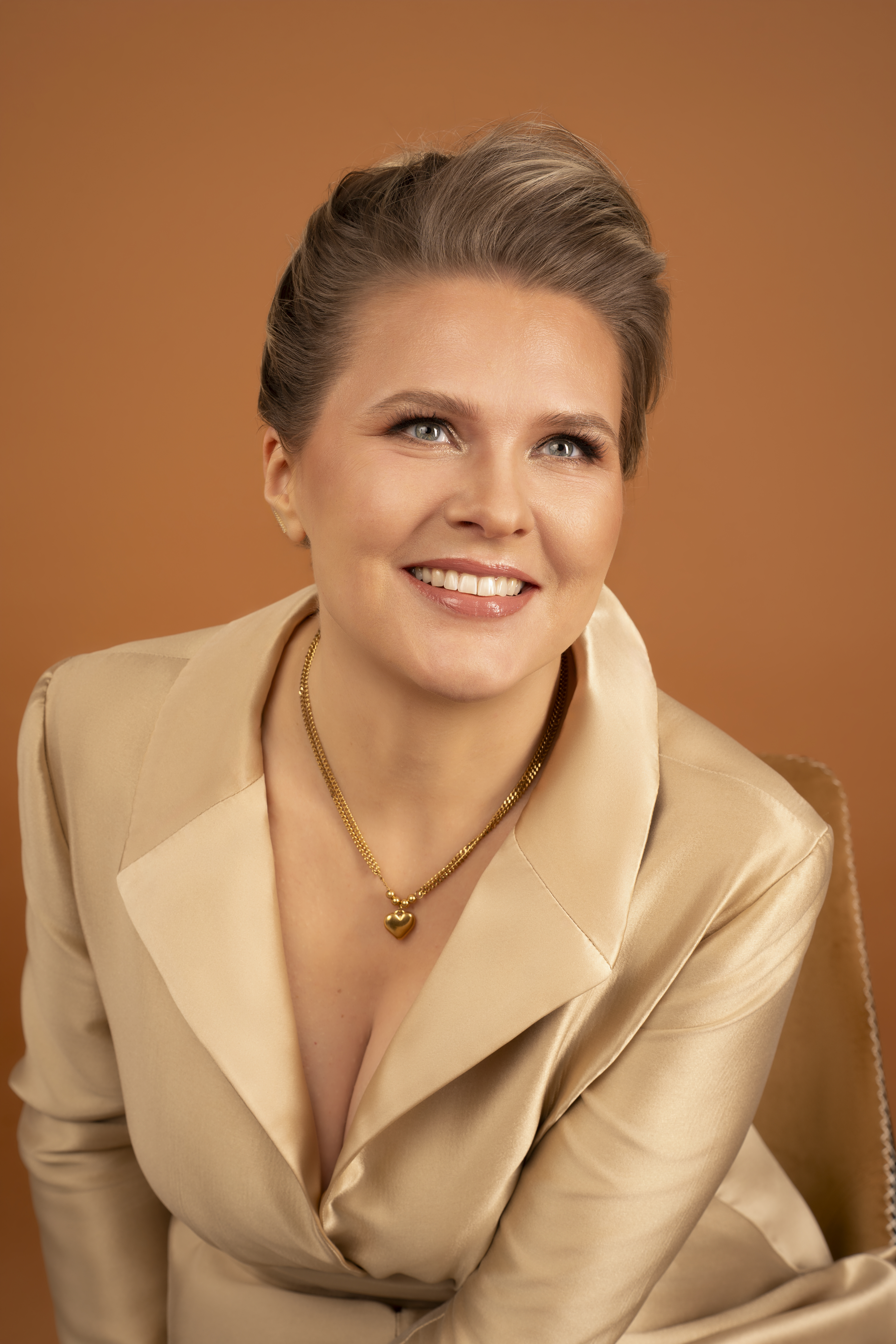
- Miškūnaitė in 2026

Background information
- Born: January 26, 1983 (age 43); Šiauliai, Lithuania
- Genres: Opera
- Occupation: Opera singer (soprano)
- Years active: 2006–present
- Spouse: Jurgis Jarašius (m. 2024)

Viktorija Miškūnaitė (born 26 January 1983) is a Lithuanian opera singer and principal soprano at the Lithuanian National Opera and Ballet Theatre (LNOBT) in Vilnius. Her main roles at the LNOBT include Violetta in La traviata, Manon in Manon, Mimi in La bohème, Cio-Cio-San in Madama Butterfly, Aida in Aida, Marschallin in Der Rosenkavalier and others. She has been awarded the Golden Cross of the Stage (Auksiniai scenos kryžiai) twice — in 2016 and 2018 — and four times has been acknowledged with Opera Soloist of the Year by the LNOBT (2015, 2017, 2023, 2025).

Internationally, she has appeared at the Verbier Festival, the Festival della Valle d'Itria, the Innsbruck Festival of Early Music, the Leipzig Gewandhaus, and concert tours in Asia including Japan and Thailand. Recorded the title role in Saverio Mercadante's Didone Abbandonata for Naxos in 2019.

== Early life and education ==
Miškūnaitė was born on 26 January 1983 in Šiauliai, the fourth-largest city in Lithuania. Since 1998, she began to sing in the church choir and later was spotted for her notable performance. In 1999, she completed the First Music School in Šiauliai. In 2001 she entered the Lithuanian Academy of Music and Theatre (LAMT) in Vilnius to study opera singing, working with professors A. Stasiūnaitė and Asta Krikščiūnaitė. She received a Bachelor of Arts in 2010 and, after continuing postgraduate study, a Master of Arts with distinction in 2012. She placed second in the Zenonas Paulauskas Competition of Young Singers (2007) and second in the V. Jonuškaitė-Zaunienė Competition of Female Singers (2010). She has also participated in the Hans Gabor Belvedere Singing Competition in Vienna and the Leyla Gencer Voice Competition in Istanbul.

In 2011, she joined the ERASMUS exchange programme and studied from October 2011 to March 2012 in the Opera Studio of the Hochschule für Musik und Darstellende Kunst Stuttgart under professor Sylvia Koncza. Concurrently she attended bel canto masterclasses with professor Delfo Menicucci at the Verdi Conservatory in Milan, and participated in the intensive vocal and dramatic courses of the Baltic states' NordOpera biennale.

In 2013 and 2014, she attended the summer academy of the Verbier Festival in Switzerland, working with Barbara Bonney, Claudio Desderi, Tim Carroll, and Thomas Quasthoff, and took part in OpernWerkstatt masterclasses in Sigrswil with stage director Peter Konwitschny. She received the special Verbier Festival Academy Award in 2013. In 2017, she attended the Rodolfo Celletti bel canto academy in Martina Franca, Italy and received the Best Bel Canto Soloist of the Year (Paolo Grassi Foundation).

== Career ==
=== Early career ===
Miškūnaitė began performing professionally in 2006. In 2007 she made her professional stage debut at the Lithuanian National Philharmonic where she performed the leading role of Pippi Longstocking in Giedrius Kuprevičius's children's musical Kirvirsavero saloj (On the Island of Kirvirsaver). Additionally, she sang with the Lithuanian Chamber Orchestra, the Čiurlionis Quartet, the St. Christopher Chamber Orchestra, the Klaipėda Chamber Orchestra, the Lithuanian Armed Forces Headquarters Band and others.

In 2010, she took part in Druskininkai contemporary art festival DRUSKOMANIJA where performed the soprano part in Rūta Vitkauskaitė's opera Kliudžiau (I Hit the Mark). She was later invited to appear at the contemporary music festival Gaida, and the Tytuvėnai summer festival. For the Vilnius City Opera she created the roles of Despina in Così fan tutte, Mimì in La bohème, and Ines in Il trovatore.

In 2012, she joined the European tour of the SWR Symphony Orchestra Baden-Baden under conductor Sylvain Chamberlain, performing the Young Girl in Schoenberg's Moses und Aron. The tour included concerts at the Berliner Philharmonie, the Teatro Real in Madrid, the Lucerne Festival, and in Strasbourg.

=== Lithuanian National Opera and Ballet Theatre ===
The Lithuanian National Opera and Ballet Theatre in Vilnius, where Miškūnaitė has been a principal soprano since 2015

Miškūnaitė made her stage debut at the LNOBT on 31 December 2012 as Rosalinde in Strauss's Die Fledermaus, and joined the company as a principal soprano in 2015.

She is best known at the LNOBT for the title role in Massenet's Manon, which earned her the LNOBT's Opera Soloist of the Year award in 2015 and the Golden Cross of the Stage in 2016. Her other principal roles at the theatre have included Violetta in La traviata, Micaela in Carmen, Mimì and Musetta in La bohème, Elisabetta di Valois in Don Carlo, Giulietta in I Capuleti e i Montecchi (conducted by Sesto Quatrini, directed by Vincent Boussard, June 2017), Tatiana in Eugene Onegin, Antonia in Les Contes d'Hoffmann, Rachel in La Juive, the Marschallin in R. Strauss's Der Rosenkavalier, Cio-Cio-San in Madama Butterfly, Aida in Aida, Suor Angelica in Puccini's Il trittico, and Elettra in Mozart's Idomeneo (directed by Graham Vick, 2018). Among the directors and conductors she has worked with are Robert Wilson, Jürgen Flimm, Günter Krämer, Peter Konwitchny, Hugo de Ana, Arnaud Bernard, Damiano Michieletto, and Cristina Mazzavillani Muti.

She received a second Golden Cross of the Stage in 2018 for her portrayal of Giulietta in I Capuleti e i Montecchi.

In 2019, while covering the title role in Puccini's Turandot at the LNOBT, she received a letter from director Robert Wilson comparing her voice to that of Montserrat Caballé, and was subsequently cast in the premiere.

In September 2025, she performed as Aldona in the Lithuanian premiere of Ponchielli's I Lituani (directed by Hugo de Ana), a work drawn from Adam Mickiewicz's poem Konrad Wallenrod, and was subsequently named Opera Soloist of the Year 2025 by the LNOBT — her fourth such award.

=== Concerts and festivals ===
Beyond opera, Miškūnaitė's concert repertoire includes the soprano solos in Handel's oratorio La Resurrezione, Brahms's German Requiem, Beethoven's Symphony No. 9, Rachmaninoff's The Bells, and Górecki's Symphony No. 3.

She sang the soprano part in Richard Strauss's Vier letzte Lieder at a "Richard Strauss Gala" concert with the Lithuanian National Symphony Orchestra under Modestas Pitrėnas at the Compensa concert hall in Vilnius. In February 2020, she appeared in Skiriama Nepriklausomybei ("Dedicated to Independence"), a concert marking the 30th anniversary of the restoration of Lithuania's independence held under the patronage of President Gitanas Nausėda, in which the LNSO performed a programme of Lithuanian composers.

The Pažaislis Monastery near Kaunas, home of the Pažaislis Music Festival, where Miškūnaitė opened the 2023 edition as Santuzza in Cavalleria Rusticana

At the Pažaislis Music Festival, Lithuania's largest classical music festival, she opened the 28th edition in June 2023 as Santuzza in a concert performance of Mascagni's Cavalleria Rusticana with the LNOBT Symphony Orchestra and Choir under Ričardas Šumila at the Pažaislis Monastery in Kaunas. She returned to the festival in May 2024 for a recital dedicated to Puccini with the Kaunas City Symphony Orchestra under Constantine Orbelian and the Kaunas State Choir under Robertas Šervenikas. In November 2024, she performed at the Vilnius Festival gala marking the 70th birthday of the festival's founder, Gintautas Kėvišas, alongside Maltese tenor Joseph Calleja, violinist Sergei Krylov, and pianist Simon Trpčeski.

She has performed Ravel's Shéhérazade with the Lithuanian National Symphony Orchestra under Cyril Diederich, and Villa-Lobos's Bachianas Brasileiras No. 5 with the LNSO under Modestas Pitrėnas at the closing concert of the Lithuanian National Philharmonic Society's 84th season in May 2025.

=== International career ===
She is not a star. She is a radiant diamond, to be enjoyed up close.

— Jürgen Flimm, on Austrian broadcaster ORF, August 2018

In 2017, Miškūnaitė was the only foreign singer invited to the 43rd Festival della Valle d'Itria in Martina Franca, where she sang the Marchesa del Poggio in Verdi's Un giorno di regno for the Academia Rodolfo Celletti. In August 2018, she sang the title role in Mercadante's Didone Abbandonata at the Innsbruck Festival of Early Music, at the Tiroler Landestheater, in a production conducted by Alessandro De Marchi with the Academia Montis Regalis. The performance drew notice from critics and fellow artists alike: MusicWeb International reviewed the recording favourably, and German director Jürgen Flimm, a former Salzburg Festival artistic director, praised her performance in an interview with Austrian broadcaster ORF.

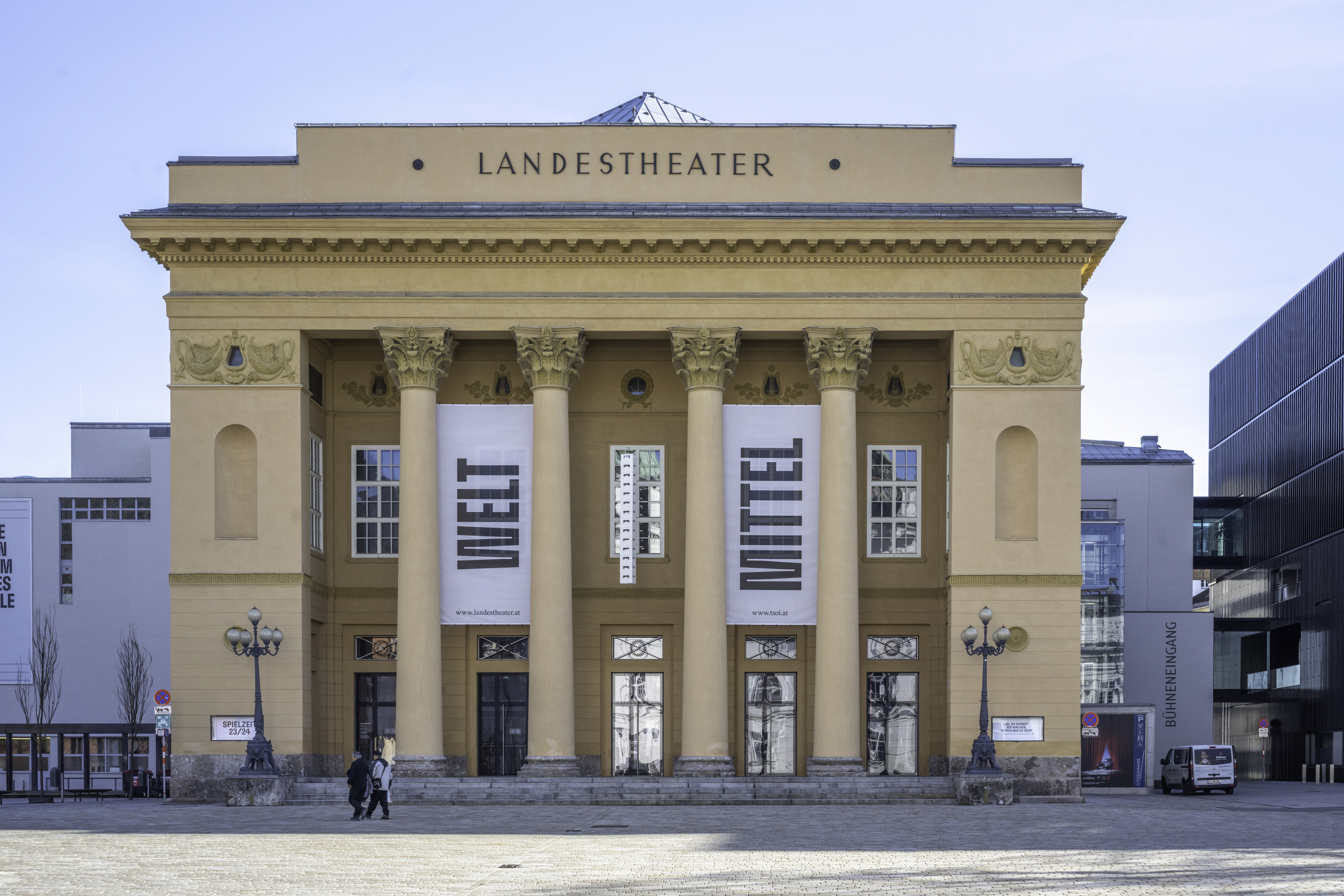
The Tiroler Landestheater in Innsbruck, where Miškūnaitė sang the title role in Mercadante's Didone Abbandonata at the 2018 Innsbruck Festival of Early Music

In May 2018, she performed the soprano solo in Rachmaninoff's The Bells with the MDR Symphony Orchestra under Risto Joost at the Leipzig Gewandhaus.

She has appeared repeatedly with the Orquestra Clássica da Madeira in Funchal, Portugal, including as featured soloist at the Madeira Flower Festival Concert in April 2023; a reviewer for the Swiss publication Cosmopolis praised the quality of her diction across four languages in the programme.

In July 2024, she performed the title role of Madama Butterfly in Bangkok, in a production organised by the Office of the Prime Minister of Thailand, the Ministry of Culture, and the Royal Bangkok Symphony Orchestra Foundation under the executive patronage of HRH Princess Sirivannavari Nariratana Rajakanya, staged to mark the 72nd birthday of King Rama X. The Princess designed 14 of the production's 54 costumes through her fashion house SIRIVANNAVARI.

In 2024, Miškūnaitė undertook a debut concert tour in the Hokkaido region of Japan, organised with support from the Embassy of Lithuania to Japan. The following year, she performed in the Lithuania–Japan Musical Dialogue concert at the M. K. Čiurlionis National Museum of Art in Kaunas.

== Discography ==
=== Opera ===
Year	Title	Role	Conductor	Label	Notes
2019	Mercadante: Didone Abbandonata	Didone	Alessandro De Marchi	Naxos NBD0095V	Blu-ray; recorded live at Tiroler Landestheater, Innsbruck Festival of Early Music, August 2018; Academia Montis Regalis; subtitles in six languages
2026	Ponchielli: I Lituani	Aldona	Ričardas Šumila	OperaVision	Streaming; recorded at the Lithuanian National Opera and Ballet Theatre, January 2026; directed by Hugo De Ana; streamed 29 May – 29 November 2026; subtitles in Lithuanian, English, and Italian

== Awards ==
Year	Award	Awarding body	Notes
2013	Congratulatory Note of the President	Office of the President of Lithuania	Awarded by President Dalia Grybauskaitė
2013	Verbier Festival Academy Award	Verbier Festival	
2015	Opera Soloist of the Year	Lithuanian National Opera and Ballet Theatre	For the title role in Massenet's Manon
2016	Golden Cross of the Stage	Lithuanian Theatre Union / Ministry of Culture	For Manon in Massenet's Manon (dir. Vincent Boussard, cond. Cyril Diederich)
2017	Best Bel Canto Soloist of the Year, Paolo Grassi Foundation	Paolo Grassi Foundation, Italy	
2017	Opera Soloist of the Year	Lithuanian National Opera and Ballet Theatre	For Giulietta in Bellini's I Capuleti e i Montecchi
2018	Golden Cross of the Stage	Lithuanian Theatre Union / Ministry of Culture	For Giulietta in Bellini's I Capuleti e i Montecchi
2023	Opera Soloist of the Year	Lithuanian National Opera and Ballet Theatre	For the title role in Verdi's Aida
2025	Opera Soloist of the Year	Lithuanian National Opera and Ballet Theatre	For Aldona in Ponchielli's I Lituani

== Roles ==
Composer	Opera	Role
Vincenzo Bellini	I Capuleti e i Montecchi	Giulietta
Georges Bizet	Carmen	Micaela
Fromental Halévy	La Juive	Rachel
Pietro Mascagni	Cavalleria Rusticana	Santuzza
Jules Massenet	Manon	Manon
Saverio Mercadante	Didone Abbandonata	Didone
Wolfgang Amadeus Mozart	Così fan tutte	Despina
Wolfgang Amadeus Mozart	Idomeneo	Elettra
Amilcare Ponchielli	I Lituani	Aldona
Giacomo Puccini	La bohème	Mimì; Musetta
Giacomo Puccini	Madama Butterfly	Cio-Cio-San
Giacomo Puccini	Il trittico	Suor Angelica
Giacomo Puccini	Turandot	Turandot
Richard Strauss	Der Rosenkavalier	Marschallin
Johann Strauss II	Die Fledermaus	Rosalinde
Pyotr Ilyich Tchaikovsky	Eugene Onegin	Tatiana
Pyotr Ilyich Tchaikovsky	Iolanta	Iolanta
Giuseppe Verdi	Aida	Aida
Giuseppe Verdi	Don Carlo	Elisabetta di Valois
Giuseppe Verdi	La traviata	Violetta
Giuseppe Verdi	Un giorno di regno	Marchesa del Poggio

== Personal life ==
Miškūnaitė lives in Kaunas. She is married to Lithuanian freelancing tenor Jurgis Jarašius, singing in various national and international opera productions; the couple married in 2024 and have appeared together on several concert programmes, including the Orquestra Clássica da Madeira's 61st anniversary gala in Funchal in February 2025.

== See also ==
- Lithuanian National Opera and Ballet Theatre
- Lithuanian Academy of Music and Theatre
- Golden Cross of the Stage
- Innsbruck Festival of Early Music
- Festival della Valle d'Itria
