= Kristoforas =

Kristoforas may refer to:

- Lithuanian variant of the given name Christopher
- Kristoforas Award, a Lithuanian theatre award
