= Antonio Gasparinetti =

Italian Poet, Playwright and Military Officer

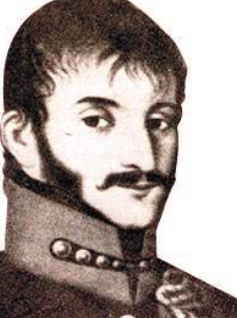
- Born: Giovanni Antonio Gasparinetti; 3 June 1777; Ponte di Piave, Italy
- Died: 1824; Milan, Italy
- Occupations: Poet and playwright; Military officer (Armée d'Italie)
- Spouse: Elisabetta Gafforini

Antonio Gasparinetti (3 June 1777 – 1824) was an Italian poet, playwright and military officer in Napoleon's Armée d'Italie. Born in the Province of Treviso, he joined a light cavalry regiment as a lieutenant in 1797 and rose to the rank of colonel by the end of his career in 1814. He distinguished himself in several major battles of the Napoleonic wars, including the Battle of Wagram when he was awarded the Legion of Honor by Napoleon. After the fall of Napoleon in 1814, he was deeply involved in the Congiura di Brescia-Milano, a plot to overthrow Austrian rule in northern Italy. When the conspiracy was discovered, he was arrested and spent nearly four years in prison. Following his release in 1818 he devoted himself to literary pursuits and collecting military memorabilia. Gasparinetti was married to the opera singer Elisabetta Gafforini from 1812 until his death in Milan at the age of 47.

== Biography ==
=== Early years ===
Gasparinetti was born in Ponte di Piave in the Province of Treviso, the third child of Francesca née Davanzo and Nicolò Gasparinetti. His father was a prosperous rural landholder, while other members of the family had held prominent positions in the local government. As a young boy he was sent to Treviso to be educated by his paternal uncle who taught humanities and rhetoric at the city's seminary. In 1792 he enrolled at the University of Padua, initially intending to study medicine, but later switching to law. He began his literary activity while still a student there, producing a play and a novella in verse and several sonnets and odes. At the university he also formed what would be lifelong friendships with the poets Ugo Foscolo and Giuseppe Giulio Ceroni. (Note: Giuseppe Giulio Ceroni (1774–1813) was a Veronese poet and officer in Napoleon's Armée d'Italie. An ardent republican who aspired to a united Italy free from foreign domination, at one point he was dismissed from the army and imprisoned because of the sentiments expressed in his poetry. He was ultimately re-admitted to the army by Napoleon and later awarded the Legion of Honor for his valor in the Peninsular War.) All three of them shared ardent republican sympathies and all three became officers in Napoleon's Armée d'Italie. Of the three, Gasparinetti would have the longest and most distinguished military career, although as with Foscolo and Ceroni, the political sentiments expressed in his poetry and oratory sometimes got him into trouble with his commanding officers. Eugène de Beauharnais, Napoleon's Viceroy in Italy and the commander of the Armée d'Italie, later recalled that Gasparinetti, Foscolo, and Ceroni gave him more trouble than the rest of the army combined.

=== Military career and marriage ===
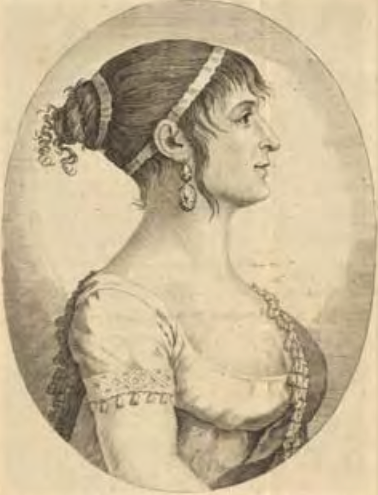
The singer Elisabetta Gafforini who married Gasparinetti in 1812

Gasparinetti had inexplicably left the University of Padua in 1796 shortly before taking his final examinations and returned to his family's home in Ponte di Piave. The following year, he enlisted in the Armée d'Italie. Over six feet tall and skilled in both firearms and horseback riding, he was given the rank of lieutenant in the newly formed light cavalry regiment (Chasseurs à Cheval). He distinguished himself in the Battle of Genola and the Siege of Genoa where both he and Foscolo were wounded and rose to the rank of captain. His military service was interspersed with periods of leave during which he dedicated himself to his literary pursuits. After one such period in 1809, he planned to retire permanently from the army, but his regiment was called up for the War of the Fifth Coalition. Gasparinetti participated in several battles of that campaign, most notably the Battle of Wagram where he was wounded and taken prisoner by the Austrians. On his release, he was awarded the Legion of Honor by Napoleon.

Gasparinetti was promoted to major in January 1812 as Napoleon was preparing for the invasion of Russia. Prior to his departure for the front, he married the opera singer Elisabetta Gafforini at the Chiesa di San Fedele in Milan on 1 April 1812. They had known each other since 1806 when he had published a sonnet and ode in her honour on the occasion of her return to La Scala from Lisbon. Their daughter and only child was born towards the end of 1812. They named her Eugenia after Eugène de Beauharnais.

Napoleon's attack on Russia and the subsequent disastrous retreat from Moscow ultimately decimated Gasparinetti's regiment. Wounded at the Battle of Vyazma, he managed to survive by feigning death, even when a Russian soldier cut off his finger to steal his ring as he lay on the ground. The loss of so many Italian commanding officers led to his promotion to the rank of colonel in 1813. His regiment was sent into further battle in Germany but by then its remains had been absorbed into the I Corps led by General Vandamme. Gasparinetti was taken prisoner at the Battle of Kulm when the French troops were defeated with heavy losses. He was not able to return to Milan and his young family until May 1814.

=== Plot of 1814 and later years ===
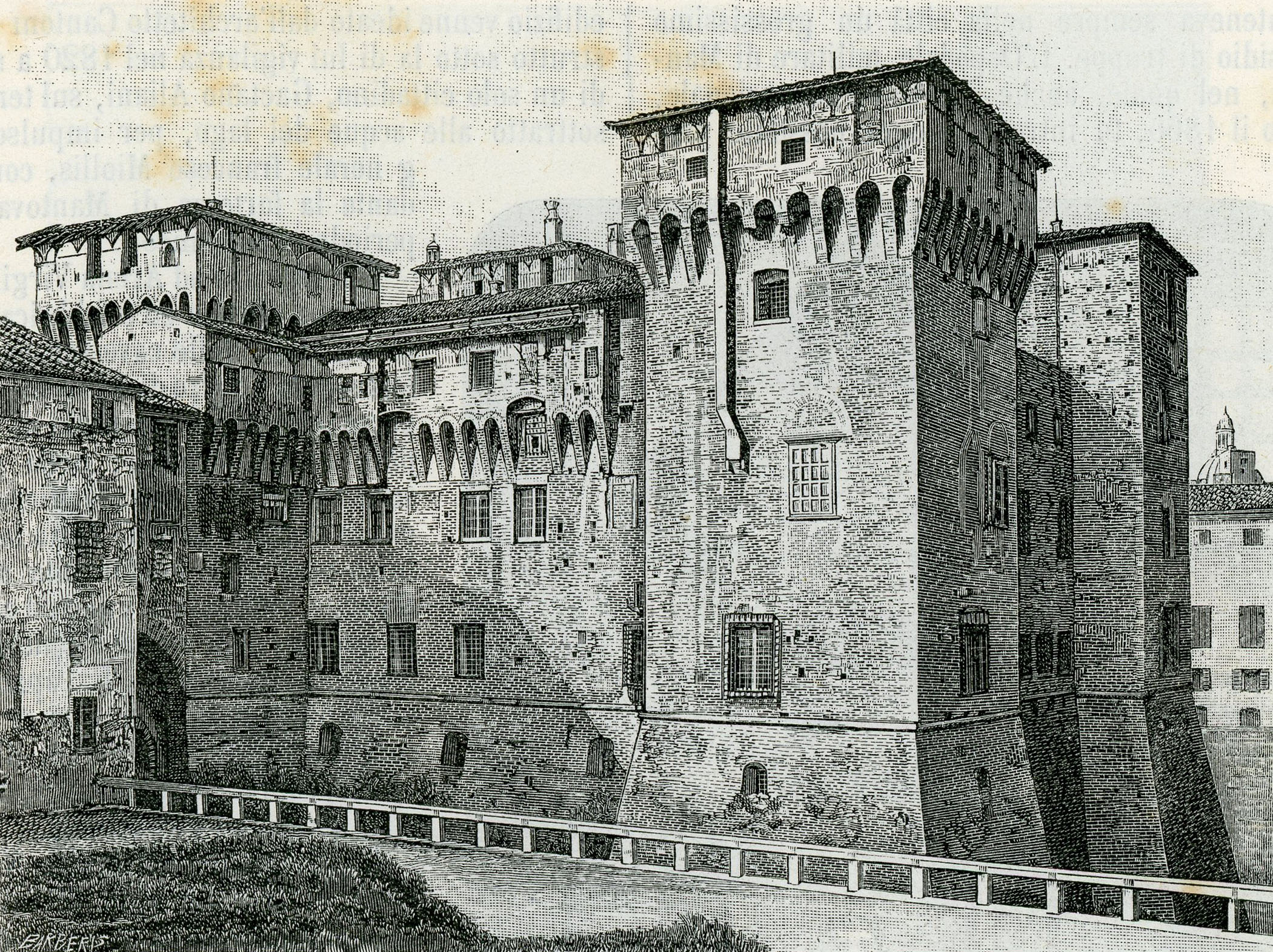
The Castello di San Giorgio in Mantua where Gasparinetti and his co-conspirators were imprisoned in 1814

The fall of Napoleon led to Austria re-taking control of Milan in May 1814. Gasparinetti was dismissed from the army along with many other officers who had been known to be ardent supporters of Napoleon. Already a Freemason and member of the Grand Orient of Italy, he became a prominent member of the Centri, a secret organization composed of military officers and intellectuals based in Mantua but with adherents throughout Lombardy and the Veneto. Their goal, according to Gian Bernardo Soveri Latuada, a lawyer and leading member of the Centri, was "to work for the moral and civil regeneration of the Italian people". However, many of them were also strongly in favour of a united Italy free from foreign domination. A number of Centri members, including Gasparinetti, Soveri Latuada, the physician Giovanni Rasori, Brigadier General Gaspare Bellotti, and severa other high-ranking ex-military officers, were involved in the Congiura di Brescia-Milano ("Brescia-Milan Conspiracy"), a plot to overthrow Austrian rule in northern Italy. When the plot was discovered by the Austrian authorities in December 1814, Gasparinetti and his co-conspirators were arrested and taken to Mantua for questioning. All of them were ultimately condemned to prison, Gasparinetti for five years.

In December 1815, the Emperor of Austria Francis I visited Milan for the first time. Gasparinetti's wife, Elisabetta Gafforini, along with the wife of Rasori, the mother of Bellotti, and the brothers of several other conspirators submitted fulsome supplications to the emperor asking for their relatives' sentences to be commuted. Earlier that year Gafforini had come out of retirement to sing at La Scala in the premiere of Il mistico omaggio, a cantata celebrating the return of Austrian rule which was performed in the presence of Archduke John of Austria. In the end, the emperor reduced Gasparinetti's sentence by 18 months, and he was finally freed on 9 March 1818. Gasparinetti lived out his remaining years in Milan, devoting himself to his writing, including two more plays. The first of them, Bibli, was dedicated to his wife. He also built up a collection of military memorabilia and became a benefactor of the main hospital in Milan. He died in 1824 in his 47th year. Elisabetta Gafforini lived on until 1847 and was survived by their daughter Eugenia.

== Literary works ==
While still a student at the University of Padua, Gasparinetti's play in free verse, Amore vendicato, was performed at the Teatro Obizzi in Padua in May 1795. (Note: The Teatro Obizzi in Padua was built in 1652 by the Italian nobleman Pio Enea II Obizzi. Initially intended for the performance of comedies, it also served as an opera house from 1693. The theatre subsequently went through a variety of owners and ceased operation in 1884.) Although it was not a particular success with the audiences, it drew favourable notice from the critic of the Gazzetta Urbana Veneta. He also wrote several poems during this time, including a sonnet, Tacea la notte, which was published in a collection marking the marriage of Agostino Nani and Pisana Savorgnan, members of two prominent families in the Veneto. Towards the end of 1795, he published a novella in ottava rima entitled Giannuccio e Cecilia. It recounts the story of two young lovers from noble Neapolitan families who, after many vicissitudes, are finally able to marry. The literary critic Guido Mazzoni noted that despite the fluency of Gasparinetti's verse and its cultured style, Giannuccio e Cecilia was a particularly insipid example of the late 18th-century vogue for "naively erotic" novellas.

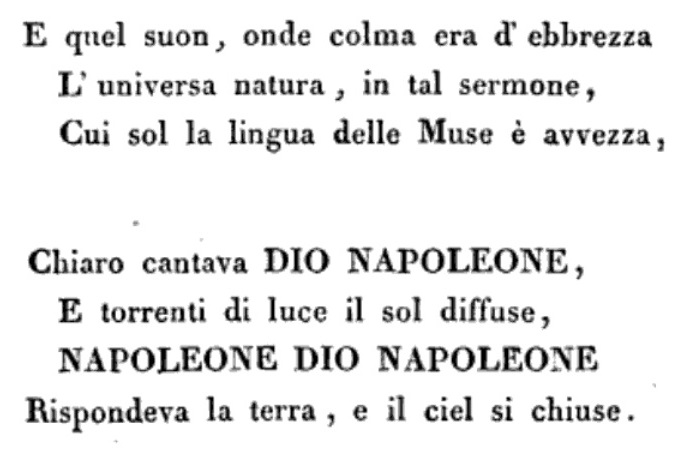
Concluding lines of Gasparinetti's ''Apoteosi di Napoleone Primo Imperadore e Re

Once he began his military career, Gasparinetti's poetry was largely devoted to patriotic republican themes and celebrations of Napoleon's victories. Several of his early poems in this vein were published in a two-volume anthology, Parnasso democratico ("Democratic Parnassus"). Subtitled Raccolta di poesie repubblicane de' più celebri autori viventi ("A collection of republican poetry by the most celebrated living authors"), the anthology was published in Bologna in 1801 and contained poetry by Gasparinetti, Giuseppe Giulio Ceroni, Vincenzo Monti, Ugo Foscolo, and a dozen other Italian poets. In 1809, Gasparinetti published Apoteosi di Napoleone Primo Imperadore e Re ("Apotheosis of Napoleon First Emperor and King"). Consisting of four cantos containing sixty tercets each, the Apoteosi was one of the few Italian poetic works that attempted to chronicle Napoleon's exploits in detail. Its closing lines repeated those spoken by Gasparinetti five years earlier during a mime depicting Napoleon in the Elysian Fields. The mime was enacted at La Scala on 3 June 1804, a national holiday celebrating the newly created Italian Republic. (Note: Gasparinetti was known for his skill as an orator. The Elysian Fields mime which he narrated at La Scala and for which he wrote the accompanying poetry was part of a performance whose main feature was the cantata Teseo composed by Vincenzo Federici to a libretto by Vincenzo Monti.)

After his release from prison Gasparinetti completed his five-act tragedy Bibli which he had begun ten years earlier. (Note: Ugo Foscolo had also begun a play on Bibli (Byblis) in 1809, but abandoned the project when he heard that his friend Gasparinetti was writing one on the same subject.) It was published by Sonzogno in 1819 and dedicated to his wife Elisabetta with an accompanying sonnet entitled A Nabitte ("To Nabitte", an anagram of her diminutive name, "Bettina"). Mazzoni described the play, which is based on the Greek myth of Byblis, as carefully versed, at times outstandingly so, and a work that was a credit to the culture and intelligence of its creator but lacking the true force of a tragedy. (Note: Mazzoni's original Italian: "Verseggiata sempre con cura, talvolta egregiamente, la Bibli fa onore alla coltura e all'ingegno di chi la scrisse; ma non è tragedia di vera forza.".) Mazzoni's views were similar to those expressed by Giovanni Battista De Cristoforis (Note: Giovanni Battista De Cristoforis (1785–1838) was a Milanese poet and writer and a member of the intellectual circles surrounding Ugo Foscolo and Alessandro Manzoni. Trained in law, he also served in several posts in the bureaucracy of the Kingdom of Italy until the fall of Napoleon in 1814.) in Il Conciliatore. That same year, the Milanese publisher Niccolò Bettoni announced that he was bringing out a new series of works on Italian history. The first of them was to be Pierre Daru's 7-volume history of the Venetian Republic which had been recently published in Paris. Bettoni had engaged Gasparinetti to translate the work into Italian for the series, but the project was soon aborted by the Austrian authorities. Daru was viewed with great suspicion by the Austrians because of his close ties to Napoleon, his support for democratic ideals, and the praise he had received from the Italian patriot Silvio Pellico. (Note: Niccolò Bettoni (1770–1842) had a large publishing and printing business which he began in Brescia in 1806. It was particularly known for the high quality of its books and illustrations. At about the same time that Bettoni was planning his series, the first volume of Daru's history had been translated and published in Venice by Pietro Fracasso. The Austrian authorities banned Fracasso from publishing further volumes and destroyed all the copies of Volume 1. An Italian translation of Daru's work was finally completed and published by Aurelio Bianchi-Giovini in 1832.)

Gasparinetti's last major work was Imelda Lambertazzi, another five-act tragedy. Mindful of the criticisms of Bibli's neoclassical subject, this time Gasparinetti chose a medieval historical theme more in tune with the Romantic movement taking hold in Italian literature. A variation of the story of Romeo and Juliet, the play is based on the real-life figures of Imelda Lambertazzi and Bonifacio Geremei, lovers who belonged to two warring families in 13th-century Bologna—the Lambertazzi were Ghibellines while the Geremei were Guelphs. The story has been the subject of several plays written both before and after Gasparinetti's version, as well as Donizetti's opera Imelda de' Lambertazzi. Gasparinetti's version was published in 1821 in a collection of plays selected and annotated by Gaetano Barbieri. Imelda Lambertazzi appeared in Volume 8 of the collection paired with an Italian translation of Casimir Delavigne's five-act comedy Comédiens. An anonymous review in the journal Biblioteca italiana praised Gasparinetti for tackling the subject and his level of erudition but observed that the over-complexity of the plot at times detracted from the play's impact.

In 1831, seven years after Gasparinetti's death and with revolutionary sentiment for a unified Italy in resurgence, three of his poems originally published in Parnasso Democratico thirty years earlier were re-published in Antologia repubblicana ("Republican Anthology").
