= Luigi Zamboni =

Italian opera singer

Portrait of Luigi Zamboni by Giovanni Antonio Sasso

Luigi Zamboni (1767 – 28 February 1837) was an Italian operatic buffo bass-baritone.

He was born in Bologna, where he began his singing career in 1791 in a production of Cimarosa's Il fanatico burlato. Engagements followed in Naples, Parma, Venice and Rome, where he sang in operas by Valentino Fioravanti, Gioachino Rossini, Paisiello and others. He retired from the stage in 1825 and died in Florence. Zamboni's wife, the contralto Marianna Gafforini, was the sister of Elisabetta Gafforini, a prominent singer at La Scala.

== The Barber of Seville ==
The part of Figaro in The Barber of Seville was written for Zamboni by Gioachino Rossini, who was also a family friend. Zamboni created the role at the Teatro Argentina in Rome on 20 February 1816. He had urged Rossini and Francesco Sforza-Cesarini, the cash-strapped impresario of the Teatro Argentina, to engage his sister-in-law, Elisabetta Gafforini, as Rosina for the premiere. However, her fee was too high and in the end they settled on Geltrude Righetti.

== Russia ==
In 1829 Zamboni managed an Italian opera company in St Petersburg for two seasons, performing Rossini and other works.
