= Elisabetta Gafforini =

Italian opera singer

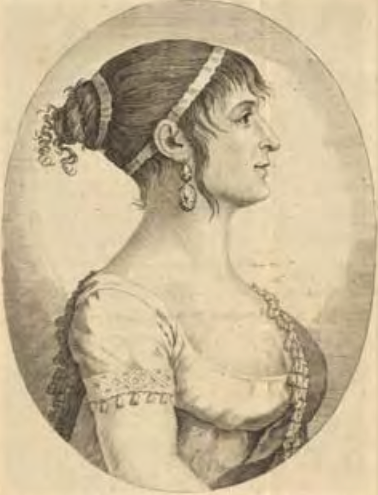
- Born: 1777; Milan, Italy
- Died: 10 November 1847; Milan, Austrian Empire
- Occupation: Opera singer (contralto)
- Spouse: Antonio Gasparinetti

Elisabetta Gafforini (1777 – 10 November 1847) was an Italian opera singer who performed leading contralto and mezzo-soprano roles, primarily in the theatres of Venice and at La Scala in Milan but also in Spain, Portugal, and other Italian cities. During the course of her 25-year career she appeared in numerous world premieres. She possessed a limpid, flexible, and resonant voice with an exceptionally wide range, and according to Stendhal was a consummate and enchanting comic actress. Gafforini was born in Milan and lived there after her definitive retirement from the stage in 1818 until her death at the age of 70.

== Biography ==
=== Early years ===
Gafforini was born in Milan in 1777, (Note: There is considerable variation in Gafforini's year of birth as given in other dictionaries and encyclopedias. Her entry in the Grove Dictionary of Music and Musicians gives c.1772. The Dizionario Biografico degli Italiani gives 1775. Francesco Regli gives 1770.) the daughter of Margherita née Fenaroli and Giuseppe Gafforini. Despite her considerable celebrity, there is little biographical data available about her early life. Her first documented performances date from 1793 when she was active in the opera houses of Venice. (Note: Some late 19th biographical dictionaries such as Neues Universal-Lexikon der Tonkunst claim that Gafforini made her stage debut in Vienna in 1789 in an unspecified performance, although the date is highly unlikely given her date of birth.) Her early appearances in Venice included the premieres of Francesco Bianchi's Il Cinese in Italia (Teatro San Moisè, 1793) and La secchia rapita (Teatro San Samuele, 1794) and Gaetano Andreozzi's La principessa filosofa (Teatro San Benedetto, 1794). Over the next six years Gafforini continued to appear in Venice as well as in Verona, Trieste, Livorno, and Turin. During this period her younger sister, Marianna Gafforini, often appeared with her in secondary roles. Marianna later married the bass Luigi Zamboni. (Note: There was also a tenor named Francesco Gafforini who was singing in Venice at the same time as Elisabetta and Marianna and later appeared with Elisabetta when she was singing in Lisbon.)

=== Stardom in Milan and Lisbon ===
Gafforini made the first of her many appearances at La Scala in March 1801. That spring she sang in four comic operas there: revivals of Mayr's Che Originali!, Gazzaniga's Fedeltà ed amore alla prova, and Portugal's Le Donne cambiate, and the premiere of Orlandi's Il Podestà di Chioggia. In April she also sang in the premiere of Francesco Pollini's cantata Il Trionfo della pace. It was given a gala performance at La Scala to celebrate the Treaty of Lunéville, which reconfirmed Napoleon's rule over Milan. The following November Gafforini sang the role of the Contessa in the premiere of Giuseppe Mosca's Il sedicente filosofo. By this time, her physical beauty and talent for comedy had made her the idol of La Scala's audiences. A four-page leaflet was published to coincide with the premiere of Il sedicente filosofo, containing an adulatory sonnet and her portrait. Beneath her portrait was a couplet which was frequently repeated in later writings about her:

La vedi o l'odi eguale è'l tuo periglio
Ti vince il canto, e ti rapisce il ciglio.

(Seeing her or hearing her, your peril is the same,
Her voice conquers you and her eyes ravish you.)

Stendhal, who had attended many of her performances at La Scala, later recalled:

In her, the comic genius flowered in all its glory. Her performances in La Dama soldato, in Ser Marcantonio and in Il Ciabattino were unforgettable. Never again shall there be born into the world, solely for the purpose of ministering to the frivolous pleasures of sophisticated people, another living being that so shone and sparkled, whose wit was more irrepressible, nor whose merriment was more irresistible.

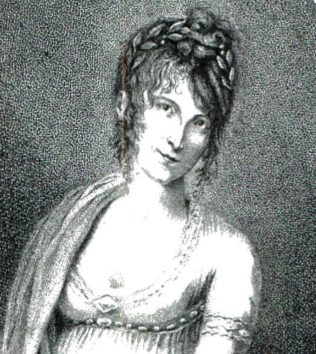
Gafforini in her artfully dishevelled hairstyle, depicted in Lisbon in 1804

Gafforini continued to sing at La Scala for the 1802 season, appearing in several operas including the world premieres of Mosca's La fortunata combinazione and Fioravanti's La capricciosa pentita. She then left for Lisbon, where she was the prima donna of an Italian opera buffa company led by Fioravanti. She performed in numerous operas at the Theatro de São Carlos between 1803 and 1805, including the world premiere of Fioravanti's La donna soldato. The young women in the São Carlos audiences were fascinated by her way of styling her thick blond hair to look artfully "dishevelled" and soon began imitating it. The Portuguese word "gaforina" was coined to describe both Gafforini's hairstyle and the type of woman who wore it. The word appears in later writings by both Aquilino Ribeiro and Eça de Queirós.

Gafforini returned to Milan and the stage of La Scala in 1806, appearing in the spring in a revival of La capricciosa pentita and in the summer in the premiere of Franz Dussek's La feudataria. However, there was trouble in the autumn season. Gafforini starred in the premiere of Benedetto Neri's I saccenti alla moda (The Fashionable Prigs), a dramma giocoso satirizing the political regime of Milan. It proved very popular with the audience, but she was accused by the authorities of "shameless behavior" during the performance. This led to her being banned for a year from La Scala and other royal theatres under the patronage of Napoleon. At the same time, her future husband, Antonio Gasparinetti, had published a sonnet in her honour, and that too was seen as expressing anti-French sentiments, despite the fact that Gasparinetti was an ardent supporter of Napoleon and had served as a cavalry officer in Italy's Napoleonic troops.

Gafforini was welcomed back to La Scala in the 1808 season and continued to sing there and at the Teatro Carignano in Turin until 1811. Towards the end of that period she ventured into opera seria, singing two en travesti roles previously assigned to castrati. She was Annibale (Hannibal) in Giuseppe Farinelli's Annibale in Capua and King Abradate in Nicolini's Abradate e Dircea. Although the repertoire throughout her main career had been overwhelmingly in the opera buffa genre where she excelled, she had sung similar roles in her early days in Venice: Giulio Cesare (Julius Caesar) in Francesco Bianchi's La morte di Cesare and Giovanni Talbot (John Talbot) in Gaetano Andreozzi's Giovanna d'Arco, both at La Fenice in 1797.

=== Marriage and later years ===
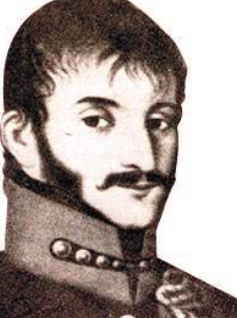
Gafforini's husband, Antonio Gasparinetti

From late 1811 through early 1812, Gafforini was engaged by the Teatro San Carlo in Naples. She appeared there in Orlandi's La dama soldato, Portugal's Oro non compra amore, and Mosca's Il salto di Leucade. On her return to Milan, Gafforini and her lover, Antonio Gasparinetti, were married at the Chiesa di San Fedele on 1 April 1812. Their daughter and only child, Eugenia, was born later that year some time after Gafforini's summer appearance at the Teatro Eretenio in Vicenza in La dama soldato. From 1812 Gafforini had effectively retired from the stage although she made a few sporadic appearances between 1815 and 1818. Her brother-in-law, Luigi Zamboni, for whom Rossini wrote the role of Figaro in The Barber of Seville, had urged Rossini and the impresario Francesco Sforza-Cesarini to entice Gafforini out of retirement to sing Rosina at the opera's premiere. However, her fee was too high and in the end they settled on Geltrude Righetti.

In 1815 Gafforini sang once again at La Scala in Il mistico omaggio, a cantata by Vincenzo Federici and Ferdinando Orlandi sung in the presence of Archduke John of Austria to mark the return of Milan to Austrian control. Her last known stage appearances were at La Fenice in Venice where she appeared en travesti in the premieres of Mayr's Lanassa as General Montalbano (1817) and Francesco Basili's L'orfana egiziana as Tanizio (1818).

Antonio Gasparinetti died in 1824. Elisabetta lived on until 1847. On her death at the age of 70, her daughter erected a large marble memorial to her along the grand staircase of the Ospedale Fatebenefratelli in Milan. The inscription reads:

To Elisabetta Gafforini, widow of Italian Colonel Antonio Gasparinetti. A most celebrated singer, an affectionate and tender mother. A principled, wise, honest, and intelligent creature. Placed here by her desolate and grieving daughter, Eugenia Gasparinetti Lanfranchi. (Note: Original Italian: "Elisabetta Gafforini, vedova di Antonio Gasparinetti Colonnello italiano. Celeberrima nel canto, provida, affettuosa e tenera madre. Onesta, giudiziosa, saggia, ed ingegnosa creatura. La figlia Eugenia Gasparinetti Lanfranchi desolatissima e riconoscente posa.")
