= Didone abbandonata (Mercadante) =

Opera by Saverio Mercadante

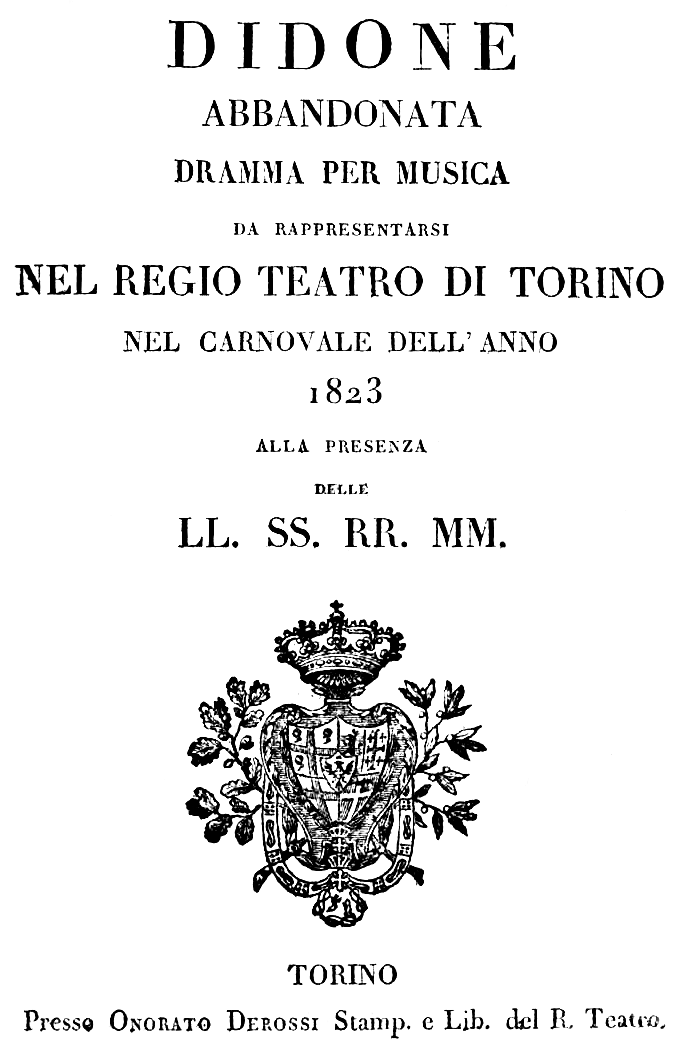
Libretto title page, 1823

Didone abbandonata is an 1823 opera in two acts by Saverio Mercadante to a libretto by Andrea Leone Tottola after Metastasio's Didone abbandonata. It was first performed on 18 January 1823 at the Teatro Regio in Turin.

Role	Voice type	Premiere cast, 18 January 1823 Conductors: Luigi Molino (1st violin) and Bernardo Ottani (harpsichord)
Didone, Queen of Carthage	soprano	Carolina Neri Passerini
Enea, in love with Dido	contralto en travesti	Fanny Eckerlin
Jarba, under the name Arbace, King of the Moors	tenor	Nicola Tacchinardi
Osmida, Didone's confidant	bass	Raffaele Benetti
Araspe, Jarba's confidant, secretly in love with Selene	tenor	Pietro Gentili
Selene, Sidone's sister, secretly in love with Enea	soprano	Gioconda Vitali

Role	Voice type	Premiere (in modern times), 18 August 2018 Conductors: Alessandro de Marchi (Conductor)
Didone, Queen of Carthage	soprano	Viktorija Miskunaite
Enea, in love with Dido	contralto en travesti	Katrin Wundsam
Jarba, under the name Arbace, King of the Moors	tenor	Carlo Allemano
Osmida, Didone's confidant	bass	Pietro Di Bianco
Araspe, Jarba's confidant, secretly in love with Selene	tenor	Diego Godoy
Selene, Sidone's sister, secretly in love with Enea	soprano	Emilie Renard

== Recording ==
- Didone abbandonata – Viktorija Miskunaite, Katrin Wundsam, Carlo Allemano, Emilie Renard, Diego Godoy, Pietro di Bianco, Coro Maghini, Academia Montis Regalis, Alessandro De Marchi DVD, Naxos, 2018
