= Enrico di Borgogna =

Opera by Gaetano Donizetti

- Opera by Gaetano Donizetti
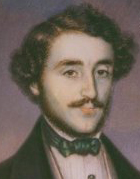
- Donizetti as a young man
- Librettist: Bartolomeo Merelli
- Language: Italian
- Based on: Der Graf von Burgund by August von Kotzebue
- Premiere: 14 November 1818; Teatro San Luca in Venice

Enrico di Borgogna (Henry of Burgundy) is an opera eroica or "heroic" opera in two acts by Gaetano Donizetti. Bartolomeo Merelli (who later, as Intendant at La Scala, was to commission Verdi's first opera), wrote the Italian libretto based on Der Graf von Burgund by August von Kotzebue.

Enrico di Borgogna was the third opera composed by Donizetti, but the first to be performed. It premiered on 14 November 1818 at the Teatro San Luca in Venice. In spite of difficulties at the premiere, the critic of Nuovo osservatore veneziano noted of Donizetti that "one cannot but recognize a regular handling and expressive quality in his style. For these, the public wanted to salute Signor Donizetti on stage at the end of the opera".

For the first time in 200 years, the opera was presented at the Teatro Sociale of Bergamo in 2018 (native city of the composer), conducted by Alessandro de Marchi.

== Roles ==
Role	Voice type	Premiere Cast, 14 November 1818 (Conductor:)
Brunone	baritone	Giuseppe Fioravanti
Elisa	mezzo-soprano	Adelina Catalani
Enrico	contralto	Fanny Eckerlin
Geltrude	soprano	Adelaide Cassago
Guido	tenor	Eliodoro Spech
Gilberto	bass	Andrea Verni
Nicola	tenor	Pietro Verducci
Pietro	tenor	Giuseppe Fusconi

== Synopsis ==
The king has been deceived and murdered by his own brother. The king's bodyguards, Pietro and Brunone, manage to escape with Enrico, the first-born son of the king and the rightful heir to the throne. During Pietro’s escape, his wife is killed before they can get to safety. Brunone stays in the castle, becoming the new king's bodyguard.

Time: The Middle Ages
Place: Burgundy

=== Act 1 ===
Nicola, the young shepherd, and his friends find the old man Pietro weeping before by his wife's grave, as he has done many times. He tries to cheer him up, and, after that, carries on with his work, leaving Pietro alone.

Enrico, now a young man, is on his way home from fishing; he is tired of the simple life up in the mountains and is longing for something more exciting. He is also thinking about the girl of his dreams, Elisa, whom he has seen several times in the mountains.

Brunone arrives at Pietro's cabin and tells him that the king is dead and that his weak son Guido has taken his place. He explains that this is the time to strike if they want to see Enrico installed on the throne. When Enrico arrives and learns the truth, they give him his father's sword and he decides to accept his fate.

In the castle the new king Guido and his jester Gilberto are planning Guido's marriage with Elisa, but she has just lost her father and is still mourning; she refuses to marry Guido, but he forces her to accept his proposal, and the wedding plans begin.

==== Scene: Day - at the court in Arles ====
The jester Gilberto speaking to Guido says that truth and merit are overrated. Guido asks the jester to tell him what the people think of him becoming their king. Gilberto flatters him, but Guido is not satisfied until he learns that some of the people are complaining.

Elisa enters in the company of Guido's bodyguards who invites her to rejoice in the happiness of marriage. Elisa is unhappy. She hope to see Enrico again. When she is left alone with her lady in waiting, Geltrude, she confesses to her of her love. Guido forces Elisa to change her mourning clothes into the wedding attire and appeals to her to give in to his great love for her. She replies that he can force her into marriage but her heart will never change.

===== Scene: Evening – in the square =====
The wedding procession has gathered in the square. Enrico and Pietro arrive and are unaware of the wedding. Elisa faints. Pietro and Brunone furiously try to stop Enrico's jealousy from revealing himself as her true love. A heavy storm occurs, and Guido is forced to postpone the wedding.

=== Act 2 ===
==== Scene: Night - at the castle ====
Brunone and Pietro reveal to the insurgents that Enrico has returned. Enrico has slipped into the castle to see Elisa for the last time. Enrico meets jester Gilberto who at the last moment hides him from Guido. Gilberto promises to show Enrico to Elisa's room.

Elisa enters. Guido is threatening her with death if she did not keep her promise of marriage. The threat is ineffective because she would rather die than marry Guido. Guido gives the order for the wedding and leaves the room. Gilberto shows Enrico to Elisa's room with the warning that women are in the world to create disorder.

Enrico and Elisa meet. At first, he rejects her declaration that she was forced into marriage with Guido. When he learns about her promise to her father, he understands everything and the two reunite. Guido rushes into the room. At the same time Brunone, Pietro and Nicola entered the castle. The truth about Enrico's birth is revealed to Guido and Elisa. Guido orders the confused guards to arrest the four but the guards put down their weapons and Enrico wins.

==== Scene: Daybreak - at the castle ====
Guido is terrified. People storms in and want to take revenge on Guido, but Enrico admonishes his people with a message of peace.

== Recordings ==
- A Hundred Years of Italian Opera contains Enrico's Act I: Recitative and Cavatina, Elisa! Elisa! Oh! me infelice Care aurette che spiegate, sung by Della Jones. Opera Rara ORCH103; also in The Young Donizetti Opera Rara ORR 229
- A recording of Enrico di Borgogna, performed at the 2018 Donizetti Festival in Bergamo, was released by Dynamic on DVD (37833) and Blu-ray (57833). Alessandro de Marchi conducted the Academia Montis Regalis with the Coro Donizetti Opera (dir Silvia Paoli) with soloists Anna Bonitatibus, Sonia Ganassi, Levy Segkapane, Francesco Castoro, and Luca Tittoto.
