= Le nozze in villa =

Opera by Gaetano Donizetti

- Opera buffa by Gaetano Donizetti
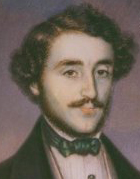
- Donizetti as a young man
- Librettist: Bartolomeo Merelli
- Language: Italian
- Based on: Die deutschen Kleinstädter by August von Kotzebue
- Premiere: 1820 or 1821; Teatro Vecchio, Mantua

Le nozze in villa (The Wedding in the Villa) is an opera buffa in two acts by Gaetano Donizetti, dating to early in his career. Completed in 1819, it was premiered at the Teatro Vecchio in Mantua sometime during the carnival season of 1820-1821; the exact date is uncertain. The libretto by Bartolomeo Merelli is based on the play Die deutschen Kleinstädter by August von Kotzebue.

== Performance history ==
The opera was a failure at its premiere, and has disappeared from performance since; save for a performance in Genoa in the spring of 1822 as I provinciali, ossia Le nozze in villa, no further mountings were known as of 1994. The piece was revived by the Donizetti Opera Festival in Bergamo in November 2020, a performance which was later released on DVD.

Donizetti's autograph score has vanished, but an incomplete copy of the work, missing a quintet from Act II, exists in the library of the Conservatoire de Paris. For the 2020 revival a new quintet was commissioned from Elio, Rocco Tanica, and Enrico Melozzi as a replacement for the missing number. Reviews of the insertion were mixed, with one critic claiming that it blended "seamlessly" into the score and another noting that its "modern harmonies and more extensive use of brass and woodwind" made it "quite different from the rest of the opera".

Merelli, in his Cenni biografici, blamed the failure of the work, despite "many successful numbers", on the "caprices and ill will of several of the singers, especially the prima donna". Fanny Eckerlin sang the lead role in the premiere.

== Characters ==
- Sabina, a young woman (mezzo-soprano)
- Trifoglio, schoolmaster (bass)
- Claudio, a young man, well-off (tenor)
- Don Petronio, Sabina's father (bass)
- Anastasia (contralto)

== Plot ==
The opera takes place in a small German town in the 18th century.

Sabina is in love with Claudio but courted by Trifoglio, to whom she has been promised in marriage by her father, Don Petronio. She carries with her a portrait of Claudio as a love token, but passes it off as being of the King; consequently, upon his appearance in the village her lover is treated as if he is royalty. After the usual misunderstandings, Trifoglio withdraws from contention when he discovers that Sabina has no dowry. As a result, Claudio wins the day, as he is a wealthy landowner and therefore agrees to give up the dowry.

== Recordings ==
- A single excerpt may be found on an anthology released by Opera Rara.
- Donizetti: Le Nozze in Villa - World Premiere Recording; Conductor: Stefano Montanari with the Orchestra Gli Originali and Coro Donizetti Opera; singers, Gaia Petrone and Omar Montanari, on November 22, 2020 at the Festival Donizetti. Label: Dynamic CDS7908.02, EAN 8007144079086
