= The Barber of Seville =

1816 opera by Gioachino Rossini

Il barbiere di Siviglia The Barber of Seville
- Opera buffa by Gioachino Rossini
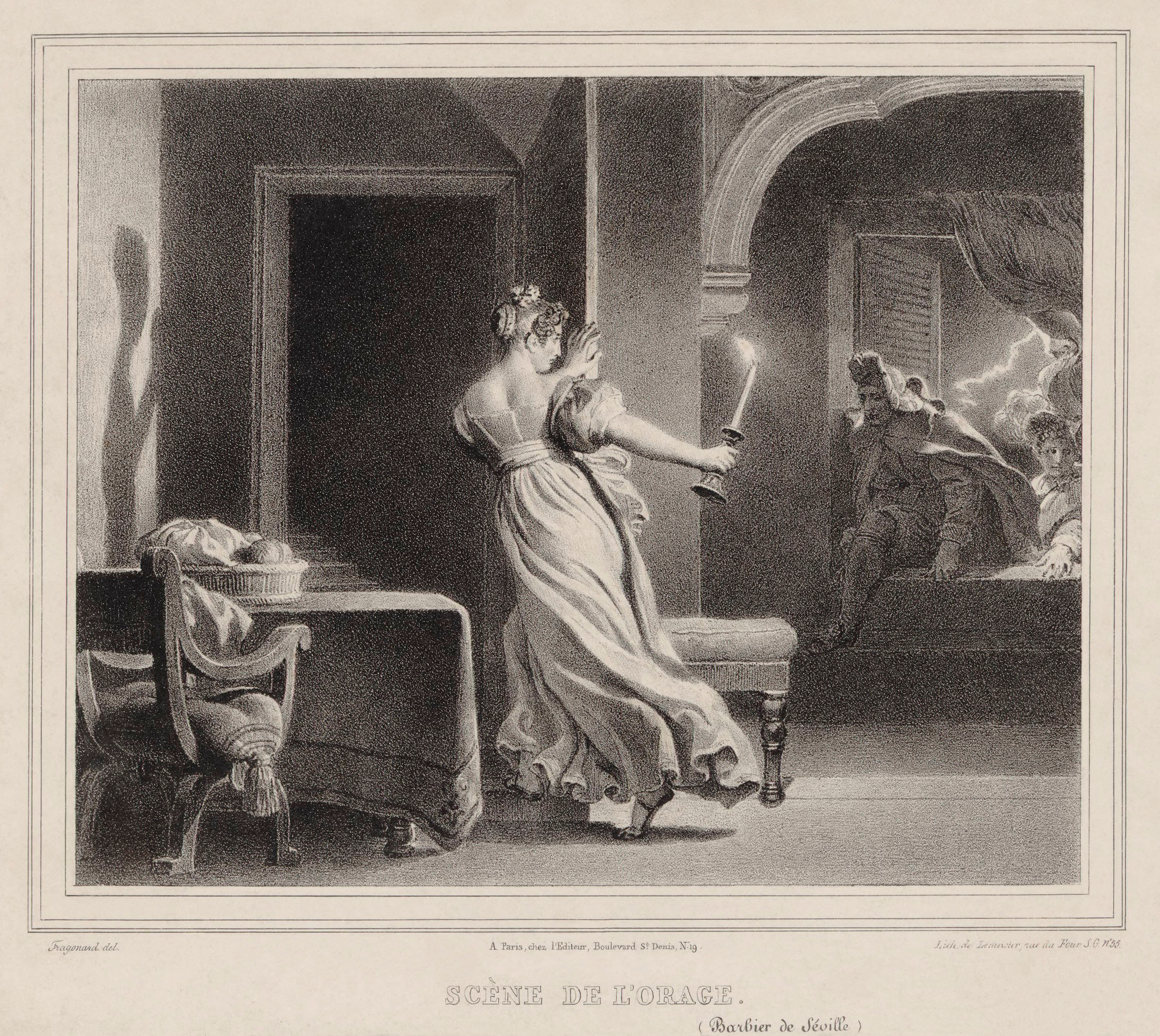
- 1830 lithograph by Alexandre Fragonard
- Native title: Il barbiere di Siviglia, ossia L'inutile precauzione
- Librettist: Cesare Sterbini
- Language: Italian
- Based on: Pierre Beaumarchais's comedy Le Barbier de Séville
- Premiere: 20 February 1816; Teatro Argentina, Rome

The Barber of Seville, or The Useless Precaution (Italian: Il barbiere di Siviglia, ossia L'inutile precauzione [il barˈbjɛːre di siˈviʎʎa osˈsiːa liˈnuːtile prekautˈtsjoːne]) is an opera buffa (comic opera) in two acts composed by Gioachino Rossini with an Italian libretto by Cesare Sterbini. The libretto was based on Pierre Beaumarchais's French comedy The Barber of Seville (1775). The premiere of Rossini's opera (under the title Almaviva, o sia L'inutile precauzione) took place on 20 February 1816 at the Teatro Argentina, Rome, with designs by Angelo Toselli.

Rossini's Barber of Seville is considered to be one of the greatest masterpieces of comedy within music, and has been described as the opera buffa of all "opere buffe". After two centuries, it remains a popular work.

== Composition history ==
Overture
Part 1 (3:41)

Part 2 (4:01)
Performed in 1929 by the New York Philharmonic conducted by Arturo Toscanini

Rossini's opera recounts the events of the first of the three plays by French playwright Pierre Beaumarchais that revolve around the clever and enterprising character named Figaro, the barber of the title. Mozart's opera The Marriage of Figaro, composed 30 years earlier in 1786, is based on the second part of the Beaumarchais trilogy. (This play was originally conceived as an opéra comique, but was rejected as such by the Comédie-Italienne.) The play as it is now known was premiered in 1775 by the Comédie-Française at the Théâtre des Tuileries in Paris.

Other operas based on the first play were composed by Giovanni Paisiello (in 1782), by Nicolas Isouard in 1796, and then by Francesco Morlacchi in 1816. Though the work of Paisiello triumphed for a time, only Rossini's version has stood the test of time and continues to be a mainstay of operatic repertoire. On 11 November 1868, two days before Rossini's death, the composer Constantino Dall'Argine (1842–1877) premiered an opera based on the same libretto as Rossini's work, bearing a dedication to Rossini. The premiere was not a failure, but critics condemned the "audacity" of the young composer and the work is now forgotten.

Rossini was well known for being remarkably productive, completing an average of two operas per year for 19 years, and in some years writing as many as four. Musicologists believe that, true to form, the music for Il barbiere di Siviglia was composed in just under three weeks, although the famous overture was actually recycled from two earlier Rossini operas, Aureliano in Palmira and Elizabeth, Queen of England and thus contains none of the thematic material in Il barbiere di Siviglia itself.

== Performance history ==
Luigi Zamboni, for whom Rossini wrote the role of Figaro, had urged Rossini and Francesco Sforza-Cesarini, the cash-strapped impresario of the Teatro Argentina, to engage his sister-in-law, Elisabetta Gafforini, as Rosina. However, her fee was too high and in the end they settled on Geltrude Righetti. The premiere of Rossini's opera, held on 20 February 1816 at the Teatro Argentina in Rome, was a disaster: the audience hissed and jeered throughout, and several on-stage accidents occurred. Furthermore, many of the audience were supporters of one of Rossini's rivals, the veteran Giovanni Paisiello, who played on mob mentality to provoke the rest of the audience to dislike the opera. Paisiello had already composed The Barber of Seville and took Rossini's new version to be an affront to his version. In particular, Paisiello's admirers were displeased with the latter inasmuch as they "were used in the way of buffo music to the style in which the pathetic often mingles with and sometimes effaces the comic". The second performance, however, was successful. The original French play, Le Barbier de Séville, had a similar story: poorly received at first, only to become a favorite within a week.

The opera was first performed in England on 10 March 1818 at the King's Theatre in London in Italian, soon followed on 13 October at the Covent Garden Theatre by an English version translated by John Fawcett and Daniel Terry. It was first performed in America on 3 May 1819 in English (probably the Covent Garden version) at the Park Theatre in New York. It was given in French at the Théâtre d'Orléans in New Orleans on 4 March 1823, and became the first opera ever to be performed in Italian in New York, when Manuel Garcia (who played Almaviva) and his Italian troupe opened their first season there with Il barbiere on 29 November 1825 at the Park Theatre. The cast of eight had three other members of his family, including the 17-year-old Maria-Felicia, later known as Maria Malibran.

The role of Rosina was originally written for a contralto. According to music critic Richard Osborne, writing in The New Grove Dictionary of Opera, "it is important to record the degree to which singers have sometimes distorted Rossini's intentions. The most serious distortion has been the upward transposition of the role of Rosina, turning her from a lustrous alto into a pert soprano." However, it has also been noted that Rossini, who frequently altered his music for specific singers, wrote a new aria for the second act for Joséphine Fodor-Mainvielle, a soprano who had sung Rosina in the 1818 London premiere, and sang the new aria c. 1820 at the Théâtre-Italien in Paris, where it was published. According to Alberto Zedda, the author of the first critical edition of the opera, 'the transposition of the part of Rosina from contralto to soprano entails the need to transfer to a lower voice the role of the seconda donna, Berta, written by Rossini for a soprano voice. A mezzo-soprano Berta will find the tessitura of her aria "Il vecchiotto cerca moglie" uncomfortable, and the climb to C_{6} required at the conclusion of the grand concertato of the first-act finale rather difficult to achieve'.

The singing lesson in act 2 has often been turned into "a show-stopping cabaret". Adelina Patti was known to include Luigi Arditi's "Il bacio", the Bolero from Verdi's I vespri siciliani, the Shadow Song from Meyerbeer's Dinorah, and Henry Bishop's "Home! Sweet Home!". Nellie Melba followed suit, accompanying herself on the piano in the final song. Pauline Viardot began the practice of inserting Alexander Alyabyev's "Nightingale". In a recording of a La Scala performance in 1956, Maria Callas sang a shortened version of "Contro un cor", transposed up a tone, in E.

Once, after Patti had sung a particularly florid rendition of the opera's legitimate aria, "Una voce poco fa", Rossini is reported to have asked her: "Very nice, my dear, and who wrote the piece you have just performed?"

"Cessa di più resistere," Count Almaviva's bravura aria at the end of act 2, was omitted from most performances starting shortly after the opera's premiere and is missing from many older "complete" recordings. (The 1959 Metropolitan Opera set is an exception, though Cesare Valletti, who sang the aria for the studio recording, never did so when he performed the role live at the Met.) More recently it has tended to be included more often than not, and audiences and home listeners have grown to expect it.

The piece is a staple of the operatic repertoire Because of a scarcity of true contraltos, the role of Rosina has most frequently been sung by a coloratura mezzo-soprano (with or without pitch alterations, depending on the singer), and has in the past, and occasionally in more recent times, been sung by coloratura sopranos such as Marcella Sembrich, Maria Callas, Roberta Peters, Gianna D'Angelo, Victoria de los Ángeles, Beverly Sills, Lily Pons, Diana Damrau, Edita Gruberová, Kathleen Battle and Luciana Serra. Famous recent mezzo-soprano Rosinas include Marilyn Horne, Teresa Berganza, Frederica von Stade, Lucia Valentini Terrani, Susanne Marsee, Cecilia Bartoli, Joyce DiDonato, Jennifer Larmore, Elīna Garanča, Isabel Leonard, Vesselina Kasarova and Aigul Akhmetshina. Famous contralto Rosinas include Ewa Podleś, who made her stage debut in that role.

== Roles ==
Roles, voice types, premiere cast
Role	Voice type	Premiere cast, 20 February 1816 Conductor: Gioachino Rossini
Count Almaviva	tenor	Manuel Garcia
Bartolo, doctor of medicine, Rosina's guardian	bass	Bartolomeo Botticelli
Rosina, rich pupil in Bartolo's house	contralto	Geltrude Righetti-Giorgi
Figaro, barber	baritone	Luigi Zamboni
Basilio, Rosina's music teacher	bass	Zenobio Vitarelli
Berta, old governess in Bartolo's house	soprano	Elisabetta Loyselet
Fiorello, Almaviva's servant	bass	Paolo Biagelli
Ambrogio, Bartolo's servant	bass	
Police Sergeant ("Officer")	bass	
A notary	silent	
Chorus: Officers, soldiers, street-musicians

== Plot ==
Place: Seville, Spain
Time: 17th century

=== Act 1 ===
The square in front of Bartolo's house

In a public square outside Bartolo's house a band of musicians and a poor student named Lindoro are serenading, to no avail, the window of Rosina ("Ecco, ridente in cielo"; "There, laughing in the sky"). Lindoro, who is really the young Count Almaviva in disguise, hopes to make the beautiful Rosina love him for himself – not his money. Almaviva pays off the musicians who then depart, leaving him to brood alone. Rosina is the young ward of the grumpy, elderly Bartolo and she is allowed very little freedom because Bartolo plans to marry her once she is of age and thus appropriate her considerable dowry.

Figaro approaches singing (Aria: "Largo al factotum della città"; "Make way for the factotum of the city"). Since Figaro used to be a servant of the Count, the Count asks him for assistance in helping him meet Rosina, offering him money should he be successful in arranging this (duet: "All'idea di quel metallo"; "At the idea of that metal"). Figaro advises the Count to disguise himself as a drunken soldier, ordered to be billeted with Bartolo, so as to gain entrance to the house. For this suggestion, Figaro is richly rewarded.

"Una voce poco fa"
Aurelia Dobrovolskaya (lyric coloratura soprano), 1914

A room in Bartolo's house with four doors

The scene begins with Rosina's cavatina, "Una voce poco fa" ("A voice a little while ago").

"La calunnia è un venticello"
Feodor Chaliapin

Knowing the Count only as Lindoro, Rosina writes to him because she is interested in getting to know him better. As she is leaving the room, Bartolo enters with the music teacher Basilio. Bartolo is suspicious of the Count, and Basilio advises that he be put out of the way by creating false rumours about him ("La calunnia è un venticello" – "Calumny is a little breeze").

When the two have gone, Rosina and Figaro enter. Figaro asks Rosina to write a few encouraging words to Lindoro, which she has actually already written. (Duet: "Dunque io son...tu non m'inganni?"; "Then I'm the one...you're not fooling me?"). Although surprised by Bartolo, Rosina manages to fool him, but he remains suspicious. (Aria: "A un dottor della mia sorte"; "To a doctor of my class").

Count Almaviva, disguised as a soldier and pretending to be drunk, enters the house and demands to be quartered there. In fear of the drunken man, Berta the housekeeper rushes to Bartolo for protection. Bartolo tells the "soldier" that he (Bartolo) has an official exemption which excuses him from the requirement to quarter soldiers in his home. Almaviva pretends to be too drunk and belligerent to understand, and dares Bartolo to brawl. While Bartolo searches his cluttered desk for the official document which would prove his exemption, Almaviva whispers to Rosina that he is Lindoro in disguise, and passes a love-letter to her. Bartolo suspiciously demands to know what is in the piece of paper in Rosina's hands, but she fools him by handing over her laundry list. Bartolo and the Count argue loudly. Basilio enters; then Figaro, who warns that the noise of the argument is rousing the whole neighborhood. Finally, the noise attracts the attention of the Officer of the Watch and his troops, who crowd into the room. Bartolo demands that the Officer arrest the "drunken soldier". The Officer starts to do so, but Almaviva quietly reveals his true identity to the Officer, and he (the Officer) backs off. Bartolo and Basilio are astonished and mystified; Figaro laughs quietly at them. (Finale: "Fredda ed immobile, come una statua"; "Cold and still, just like a statue"). The confusion intensifies and causes everyone to suffer headaches and auditory hallucinations ("Mi par d'esser con la testa in un'orrida fucina; dell'incudini sonore l'importuno strepitar"; "My head seems to be in a fiery forge: the sound of the anvils deafens the ear").

=== Act 2 ===
A room in Bartolo's house with a piano

Count Almaviva again appears at the doctor's house, this time disguised as Don Alonso, a priest and singing tutor who is substituting for the supposedly ailing Basilio. To gain Bartolo's trust, Don Alonso tells him he has intercepted a note from Lindoro to Rosina, and says that Lindoro is a servant of Count Almaviva who has dishonorable intentions towards Rosina. While Almaviva pretends to give Rosina her singing lesson ("Contro un cor"; "Against a heart"), Figaro arrives to shave Bartolo. Not wanting to leave Rosina alone with the singing teacher, Bartolo insists Figaro shave him right there in the music room. Basilio suddenly appears for his scheduled music lesson, but he is bribed by a full purse from Almaviva and persuaded to leave again, with much discussion of how ill he looks. (Quintet: "Don Basilio! – Cosa veggo!"; "Don Basilio! – What do I see?"). Bartolo overhears the lovers conspiring, and angrily drives everybody away. Berta vents about the crazy household ("Il vecchiotto cerca moglie"; "The little old man is looking for a wife").

A room in Bartolo's house with a grille looking out onto the square.

Bartolo orders Basilio to have the notary ready to marry him to Rosina that evening. Basilio leaves and Rosina arrives. Bartolo shows Rosina the letter she wrote to "Lindoro" and persuades her that this is proof that Lindoro is merely a flunky of Almaviva and is toying with her at Almaviva's behest. Rosina believes the story and agrees to marry Bartolo.

During an instrumental interlude, the music creates a thunder storm to indicate the passage of time. Almaviva and Figaro climb up a ladder to the balcony and enter Rosina's room through a window. Rosina accuses Almaviva, whom she believes to be Lindoro, of betraying her. Almaviva reveals his identity and the two reconcile. While Almaviva and Rosina are enraptured by one another, Figaro keeps urging them to leave. Two people are heard approaching the front door. They are Basilio and the notary. The Count, Rosina, and Figaro attempt to leave by way of the ladder, but discover it has been removed. Using bribes and threats, Almaviva coerces the notary into marrying him to Rosina, with Basilio and Figaro as the legally required witnesses. Bartolo barges in, accompanied by the Officer and the men of the watch, but too late; the marriage is already complete. The befuddled Bartolo is pacified by being allowed to retain Rosina's dowry. The opera concludes with an anthem to love ("Amor e fede eterna, si vegga in noi regnar!"; "May love and faith eternally be seen to reign in us").
