= Samuele (Mayr) =

Samuele is an 1821 Italian-language oratorio by Simon Mayr to a libretto by Bartolomeo Merelli. It was performed on 2 June 1821 in Bergamo's Congregazione della Carità by pupils of the Lezioni caritatevoli to welcome the arrival of the new bishop Pietro Mola.

== Recordings ==
- Samuele Franz Hauk 2CDs Naxos
