= Vincenzo Monti =

Italian poet and playwright

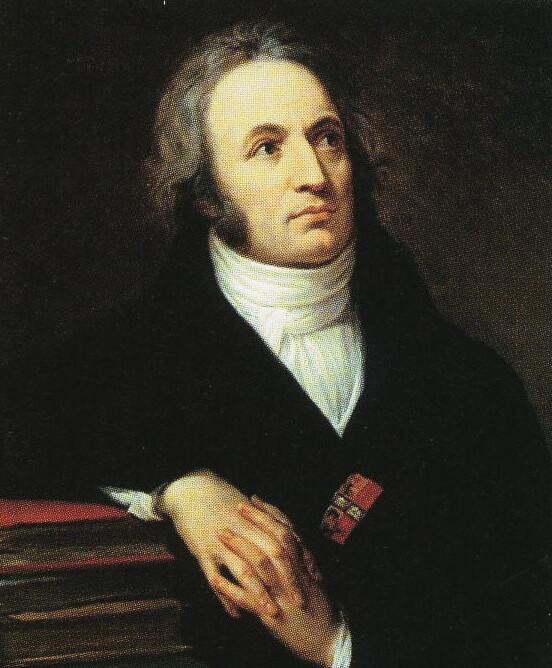
- Andrea Appiani, Portrait of Vincenzo Monti, 1809, Milan, Pinacoteca di Brera
- Born: 19 February 1754; Alfonsine, Papal States
- Died: 13 October 1828 (aged 74); Milan, Kingdom of Lombardy–Venetia
- Resting place: Ferrara Charterhouse
- Occupations: Poet, writer, literary critic
- Spouse: Teresa Pichler (m. 1791)
- Writing career
- Pen name: Autonide Saturnino
- Language: Italian
- Period: 1776–1828
- Genres: Lyrical poetry, epic poetry, literary critic
- Movement: Neoclassicism

Vincenzo Monti (19 February 1754 – 13 October 1828) was an Italian poet, playwright, translator, and scholar, the greatest interpreter of Italian Neoclassicism in all of its various phases. His verse translation of the Iliad is considered one of the greatest of them all, with its iconic opening ("Cantami, o Diva, del Pelide Achille l'ira funesta", lib. I, verses 1–2) becoming an extremely recognizable phrase among Italians (for example, being the text shown when opening a font file in Microsoft Windows).

== Biography ==
Monti was born in Alfonsine, Province of Ravenna, Emilia-Romagna, the son of Fedele and Domenica Maria Mazzari, landowners. He was educated at the seminar in Faenza and at the University of Ferrara, where he studied medicine and jurisprudence.

Monti derived from his classical education a taste for the elegance of Virgil and of the Arcadian poet Carlo Innocenzo Frugoni. In 1775, he was admitted to membership in the Academy of Arcadians, for which he took the pastoral name 'Autonide Saturnino'. In the following year, he composed the Visione d'Ezechiello ("Ezekiel's vision"), a Dantesque Vision, in terza rima, written under the influence of Alfonso Varano, which he dedicated to Cardinal Scipione Borghese, the Papal Legate in Ferrara. The Cardinal was struck by Monti's promise as a poet and invited him to Rome, where he settled in 1778.

In Rome, where he lived for some twenty years, until 1797, Monti composed odes and a variety of lengthier works. He served as secretary to Duke Luigi Braschi Onesti, enjoyed favour at the court of the enlightened and judicious Pope Pius VI, the uncle of his patron, and soon gained a leading position in Roman literary circles.

Soon after his arrival in Rome, two remarkable archaeological finds, the busts of Pericles and of Aspasia, unearthed at Tivoli and Civitavecchia respectively, provided the theme of La Prosopopea di Pericle (1779), Monti's first Roman ode. This was followed by La bellezza dell'universo (1781) and the Ode al signor di Montgolfier (1784). In the former, which is in terza rima, the beauties of Nature from the time of the Creation are depicted, in a sequence of magnificent images; the latter was written to mark the first ascent of the brothers Charles and Robert Montgolfier in their hydrogen balloon, which took off in the Tuileries on 1 December 1783. The Ode al signor di Montgolfier is typically 'Montian' in its spirit of eulogy and in its exaltation of scientific enterprise within the context of Greek myth.

The Ode al signor di Montgolfier, which was composed in the form of a canzonetta with lines of seven syllables arranged in four-line stanzas, was recited in Arcadia in 1784, the year of its composition. In the same year, Monti began one of his most distinguished poems, La Feroniade, a mythological composition of Virgilian inspiration in which he extolled the plans of Pius VI for the drainage and reclamation of the Pontine Marshes. The poem is in three cantos in versi sciolti. But although Monti worked on it occasionally throughout his life, it was left incomplete at the time of his death.

An unhappy love-affair at this time provided inspiration for Al Principe Don Sigismondo Chigi and Pensieri d'amore (1783) – the latter, with its perhaps too faithful rendering of passages from Goethe's Werther, being unique among all his poetry for its emotional content.

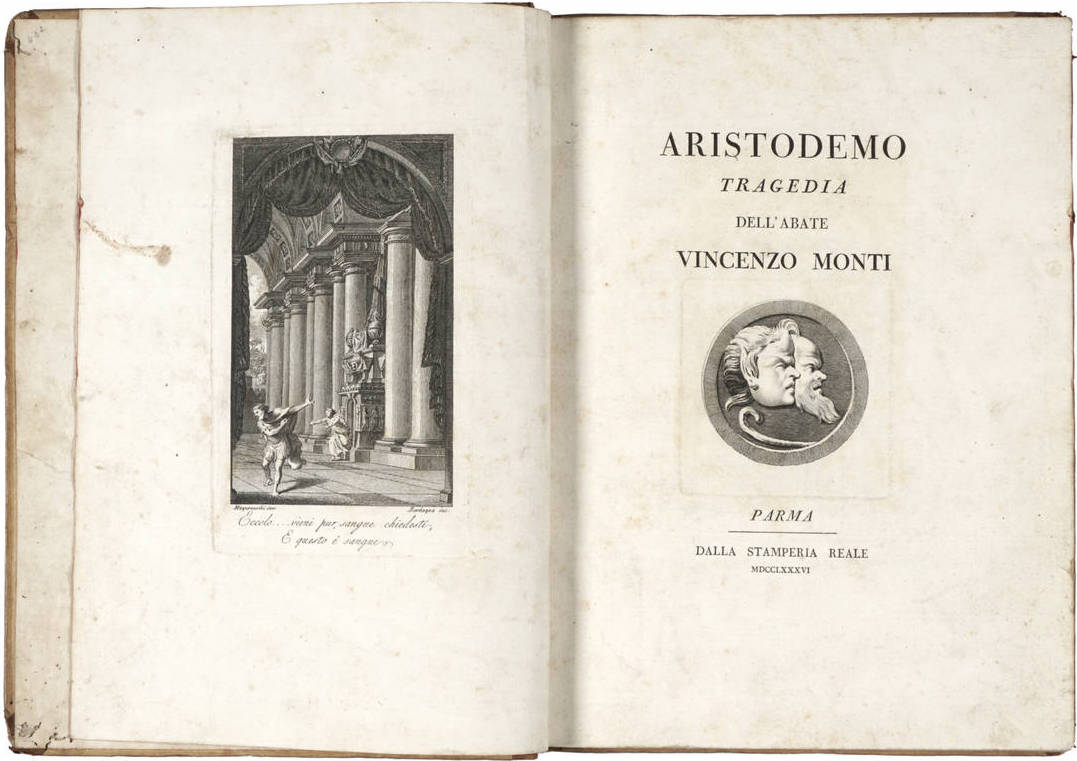
Frontispiece and title page of Vincenzo Monti's Aristodemo (Parma, 1786)

In 1785, Monti published his tragedy Aristodemo, which was received with great favour. Encouraged by this success, Monti undertook a new tragedy in the Alfieri manner, this time with a subject drawn from fifteenth-century Italian history, Galeotto Manfredi. In 1791, he married the actress Teresa Pichler who bore him a daughter, Costanza, and a son, Francesco (the latter died at only two years old). Through her, the singer Fanny Eckerlin is his niece.

In the aftermath of the French Revolution, Monti's verses became more political. At first, he was a militant classicist and counter-revolutionary; but he later became an advocate of Romantic attitudes and an enthusiastic supporter of Napoleon. In 1793, he published the Bassvilliana, (1793; tr. A. Lodge, The Death of Bassville, 1845), the most important anti-revolutionary poem that had yet appeared in Italy. The subject of the Bassvilliana, four cantos in terza rima, was provided by a political assassination: on 13 January 1793 Nicolas Jean Hugou de Basseville, who had been sent to Naples as secretary to the French Legation to sustain the Republican cause, was stabbed to death by a mob stirred up against him by the reactionaries. At this time, Monti deplored the excesses of the Revolution and the violence of the Jacobins, and in the poem, he turned the interest away from the protagonist to the unfortunate Louis XVI, who is presented as an innocent victim of the Revolutionaries. The Bassvilliana was a great success and passed through eighteen editions in six months.

In 1797 Monti left Rome and, after visiting Bologna and Venice, finally settled in Milan, forsaking his former opposition to the French Revolution (expressed in the Bassvilliana) and becoming a supporter of the newborn Cisalpine Republic. From 1797 until 1799 was secretary of foreign affairs of the Cisalpine Republic, then secretary of the Directoire.

In 1799, he was forced to leave the city when the French were defeated, but it took him only two years to come back, following the Battle of Marengo (1800). While in Paris, Monti devoted more and more of his time to translations from French and Latin, which today are considered to be his best works: he published La Pucelle d'Orleans by Voltaire, soon to be followed by the Satire by Persius and the Iliade (Iliad) by Homer.

When the French returned to Italy, Monti also returned, this time as the official Poet Laureate of the new Kingdom of Italy. Soon after his return, Monti published his tragedy of Caio Gracco, La Mascheroniana, a poem on the death of his friend Lorenzo Mascheroni, and his beautiful and popular hymn Per la liberazione d'Italia. In 1802, Monti was appointed to the chair of eloquence and poetry in the University of Pavia and on the coronation of Napoleon, in 1805, was appointed "Historiographer of the Italic Reign". He filled this office rather as a court poet than a historian, and lavished a profusion of eulogistic verses on the emperor and his family. He was made a knight of the Legion of Honour and of the Iron Crown, and was chosen a member of the Institute of the Kingdom of Italy.

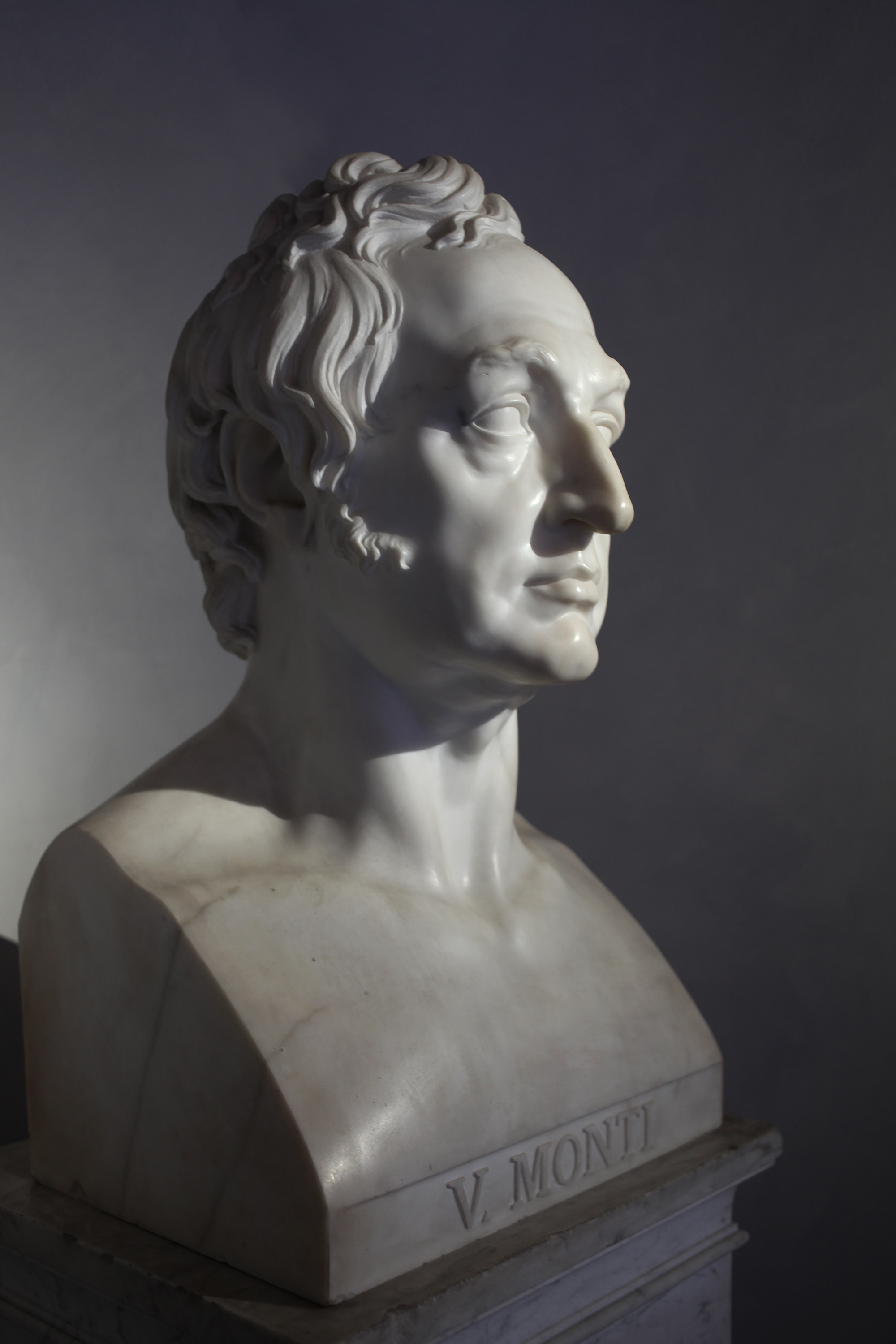
Abbondio Sangiorgio, Busto di Vincenzo Monti (1833) di trequarti

In these years Monti wrote Il beneficio (1805), celebrating the coronation of the emperor, Il bardo della selva nera (1806) - a classical-Romantic pastiche influenced especially by Ossian and the bardic verse of Thomas Gray La spada di Federigo (1806), and various other works, in a variety of forms, in which Napoleon was either directly or indirectly honoured. His translation of the Iliad in versi sciolti, which appeared in 1810, is often regarded as the most beautiful of the Italian versions of this much-translated work and Monti's poetic masterpiece.

After the fall of Napoleon in 1815, Monti tried to win back the Austrian regime with his last poems Il mistico omaggio and Il ritorno di Astrea before committing to the development of Italian linguistics during his last years. His later years were embittered by ill-health and by financial worries. He adopted a conservative standpoint and in his last poem, the Sermone sulla mitologia (1825), he roundly condemned Romantic aesthetics and defended the rights of the new literature to use mythological material, as he himself was doing in Le nozze di Cadmo e d'Ermione (1825).

Monti's poetry is notable for its rational polish and its formal elegance. A staunch classicist, he defended the value of the imaginative and evocative use of mythology (cf. La Musogonia, 1793-7), as opposed to the emotional emphasis of the Romantics (cf. the polemical Sermone sulla mitologia, 1825).

== Criticism ==
Many authors have given different opinions about the poet's value. Two factors are generally agreed upon, but they are given different weight, yielding a more or less favourable judgement: the lack of ideals and authenticity, and the superior technical skills.

In the fast-changing political scenario of his time, Monti appears not to live up to his ideals: he is blamed from the political point of view for being first an opposer to the French Revolution, then an open supporter of Napoleon, then eventually a supporter of the Austrian Empire. Furthermore, he is accused of expressing insincere feelings in his works and of only caring about the formal aspects of his productions.

In a time of strong political ideals such as the "Risorgimento" and strong interior passions such as Romanticism, famous representatives of Italian literature such as Ugo Foscolo and Giacomo Leopardi pointed to these as unforgivable flaws, whereas in their opinion a poet should never give up his beliefs in exchange for practical advantages, and should prefer a worthy content over a much refined literary technique.

== Works ==
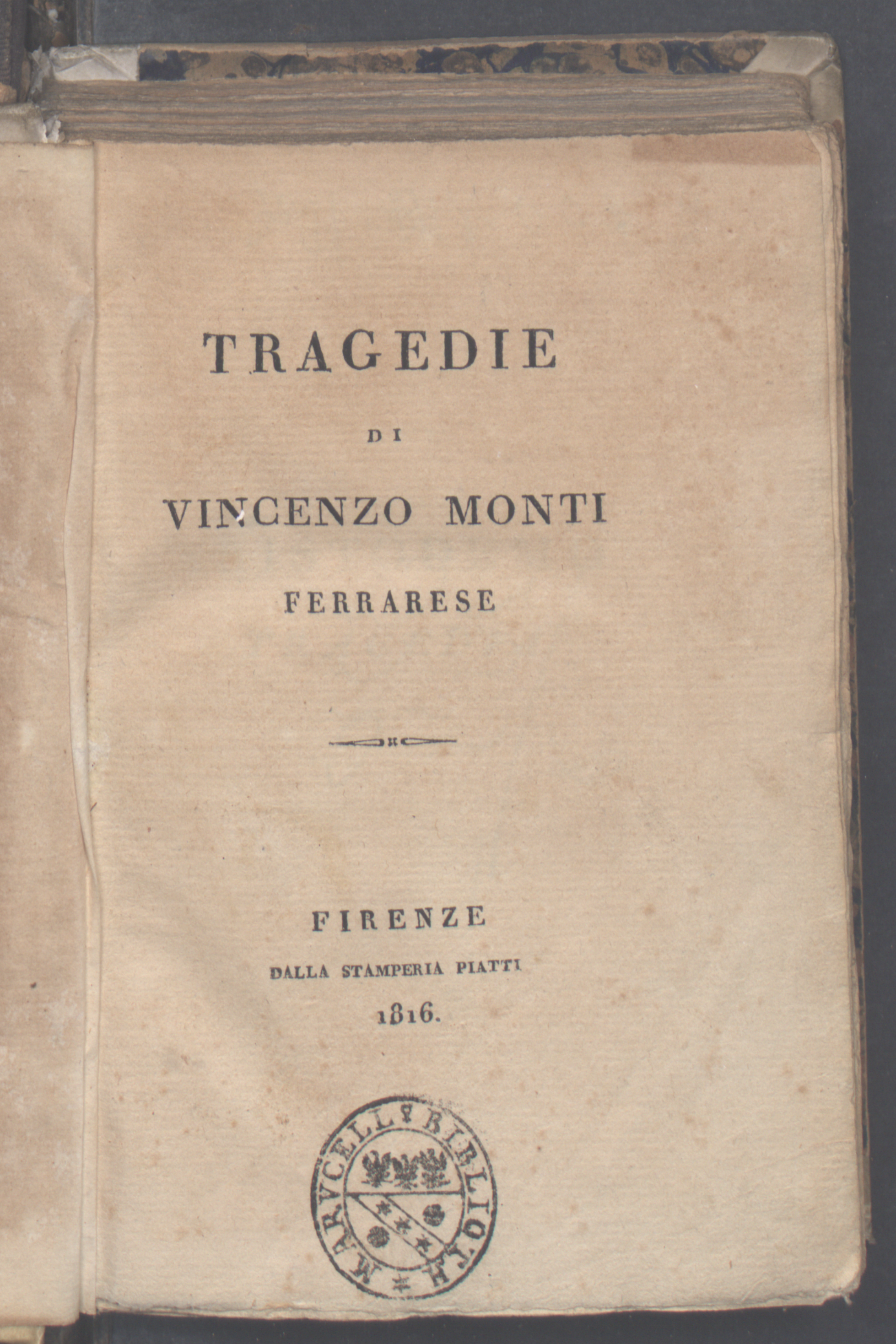
Tragedie, 1816

- 1776 – "La visione di Ezechiello"
- 1779 – "Prosopopea di Pericle" (ode) and "Saggio di poesie"
- 1781 – "La bellezza dell'universo" (short poem)
- 1782 – "Sciolti a Sigismondo Chigi" and "Pensieri d'amore"
- 1783 – "Versi"
- 1784 – "Al signor di Montgolfier" (ode)
- 1787 – "Aristodemo" (tragedy)
- 1788 – "Galeotto Manfredi"
- 1793 – "Bassvilliana"/"In morte di Ugo di Bassville" (left unfinished)
- 1797 – "La Musogonia" and "Prometeo"
- 1800 – "Poesie", "Dopo la battaglia di Marengo", and translation of Voltaire's "La Pucelle d'Orléans" -> "La pulcella d'Orleans"
- 1802 – "Mascheroniana"/"In morte di Lorenzo Mascheroni" (poem) and "Caio Gracco" (tragedy)
- 1803 – translation: "Satire" (Persius)
- 1805 – "Alla maestà di Napoleone"
- 1806 – "Il bardo della Selva Nera", translated into French by Jacques-Marie Deschamps (le Barde de la Forêt-Noire, 1807)
- 1810 – translation: "Iliade" (Homer)
- 1815 – "Il mistico omaggio"
- 1816 – "Il ritorno di Astrea"
- 1825 – "Sulla mitologia"
- 1817–1826 – "Proposta di alcune correzioni ed aggiunte al Vocabolario della Crusca"

== Sources ==
- Van Horne, John (1957). "The "Epistolario" of Vincenzo Monti as a Mirror of the Times". Italica. 34 (2): 222–227. doi:10.2307/477667.
- Bustico, Guido (1924). Bibliografia di Vincenzo Monti. Florence: Leo S. Olschki.
- Angelini, Cesare (1960). Carriera poetica di Vincenzo Monti. Milan: Fabbri.
- Mineo, Nicolò (1992). Vincenzo Monti. La ricerca del sublime e il tempo della rivoluzione. Pisa: Giardini.
- Romano, Angelo (2001). Vincenzo Monti a Roma. Rome: Vecchiarelli. ISBN 88-8247-076-8.
- Spaggiari, William (2004). "Monti e Pio VI: storia del Pellegrino apostolico". In G. Barbarisi (ed.). Vincenzo Monti fra Roma e Milano [Atti del Convegno di studi, Alfonsine, 27 marzo 1999]. Cesena: Il Ponte Vecchio. pp. 41–70.
- Phelan, Joseph (2011). "Poetic Apostasy: Southey's "A Vision of Judgement" and Vincenzo Monti's "In Morte di Ugo Bass-Ville"". The Wordsworth Circle. 42 (1): 47–51. JSTOR 24044003.
- Izzi, Giuseppe (2012). "MONTI, Vincenzo". Dizionario Biografico degli Italiani (in Italian). Vol. 76: Montauti–Morlaiter. Rome: Institute of the Italian Encyclopaedia. ISBN 978-88-12-00032-6.
