= Adelina Catalani =

19th-century Franco-Italian opera singer

Adelina, sometimes Adelaide or Adele, Catalani (fl. 1818–1832) was a Franco-Italian soprano. She is remembered today largely for the circumstances surrounding her performance of the lead soprano role in Gaetano Donizetti's first staged opera, Enrico di Borgogna, in 1818.

Catalani was known variously as la cognate della famosa and la Catalani juniore to distinguish her from the far better-known Angelica Catalani, of whom she has been described as a sister-in-law in various sources. François-Joseph Fétis claimed that she was French originally, and gave her birthplace as Toulouse. He goes on to state that she had a pretty voice which she developed without difficulty before being married and taken in hand by Catalani's brother, with whom she moved to Italy. At the time of her engagement to sing Enrico di Borgogna, she was known only as a singer of accademie, or chamber music recitals; consequently, her performance in Donizetti's opera was to be her stage debut. The composer was pleased with her voice, describing it in a letter to his teacher Giovanni Simone Mayr as a "gran bella voce", a "fine, large voice", and indicating that he planned to rewrite her part to better suit her sound.

Enrico di Borgogna was premiered on November 14, 1818, at the Teatro San Luca in Venice; in the event, the entire opera was not performed. Catalani fainted from stage fright at the end of the first act, and as a result some of her music in the second act had to be omitted; furthermore her place in the finale of the opera was taken by another singer. Catalani's indisposition was noted by the critic of the Nuovo Osservatore Veneziano, who spoke of the way the work was "maltreated" by its cast but gave favorable considerations to Donizetti's talent. In the event, the soprano recovered sufficiently to essay the complete opera on December 15 and 16.

Catalani had a secondary career performing in many theaters; she is known to have sung in Odessa as a member of Luigi Buonavoglia's company, and appeared in Saint Petersburg as well. In 1828 she made her debut at the Théâtre Italien as Isabella in Gioacchino Rossini's L'italiana in Algeri, a performance which met with less-than-favorable reception. Fétis, in his review of the evening, suggests that she appeared stricken with stage fright, and says that she sang with "timidity"; he calls audience reaction to her performance cold and indifferent, and describes the evening as the worst he had ever spent at that theater. Her performance of Amenaide in Rossini's Tancredi in the same house the following year was better-received. 1831 found Catalani singing in Naples. She is listed on the roster of La Scala as late as 1832 – she sang the role of Elena in the premiere of Elena e Malvina by Francesco Schira on November 17 – but disappears from the record thereafter.
