= Henry Charles Lahee =

Henry Charles Lahee (July 2, 1856, in London–1953) was a writer on music. He wrote several comprehensive biographical reference works on musicians.

From 1891 to 1899, he served as secretary of the New England Conservatory of Music.

== Education ==
Lahee studied at St Michael's College, Tenbury and Nautical Training College in Greenhithe.

== Publications ==
- Lahee, Henry Charles (1912). The grand opera singers of to-day. L.C. Page and Company. p. 366.
- Lahee, Henry Charles (1899). Famous violinists of to-day and yesterday. Boston: L.C. Page.
- Lahee, Henry Charles (1898). Famous singers of to-day and yesterday. L.C. Page.
- Lahee, Henry Charles (1922). Annals of Music in America. Boston: Marshall Jones.
