= Bartolomeo Merelli =

Italian impresario and librettist

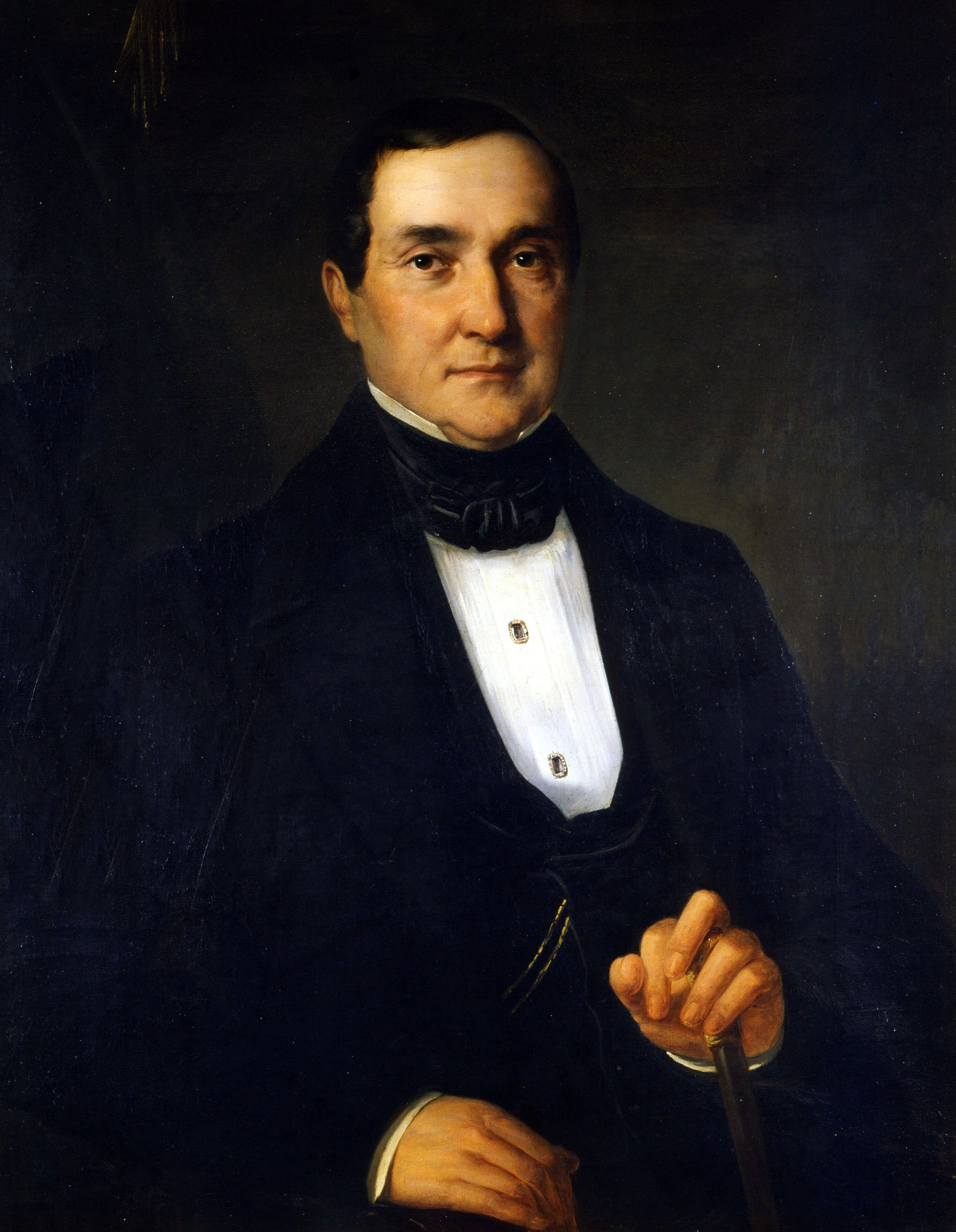
- Impresario; Bartolomeo Merelli
- Born: May 19, 1794; Bergamo
- Died: April 10, 1879 (aged 84)
- Occupations: Impresario and librettist
- Writing career
- Genre: Opera
- Notable work: Enrico di Borgogna

Bartolomeo Merelli (19 May 1794 – 10 April 1879) was an Italian impresario and librettist, best known as the manager of the La Scala Milan opera house between 1829 and 1850, and for his support for the young Giuseppe Verdi.

== Early life and theatrical agency ==
Merelli was born in Bergamo and studied composition there with Simon Mayr. (Gaetano Donizetti was in the same class as Merelli.) He moved to Milan around 1812 and worked there as a theatrical agent, at the same time writing a number of librettos for Mayr, Donizetti, Nicola Vaccai and other composers. He set up his own agency in 1826 and managed seasons in Varese, Como and Cremona between 1830 and 1835, and was joint lessee (with Carlo Balochino) of the Theater am Kärntnertor in Vienna from 1836 to 1848.

== La Scala ==
From 1829 to 1850, Merelli managed La Scala, initially in partnership with others, who included Domenico Barbaia, and then by himself from 1835. During this period, he was responsible in 1831 for the staging of Vincenzo Bellini's Norma and later for a number of works by Donizetti (e.g. Ugo, conte di Parigi, Lucrezia Borgia, Maria Stuarda and Gemma di Vergy) as well as Saverio Mercadante's Il giuramento and Il bravo.

Despite Donizetti's friendship with Merelli, the composer frequently complained about the impresario's bad judgement. He was particularly incensed when he discovered in early September 1839 that Merelli, without consulting him, was mounting a production of Gianni di Parigi which, though composed between 1828 and 1832, had never appeared on stage. Donizetti sent off a strongly-worded protest on 6 September, but it was too late and the opera premiered without any input from the composer four days later. Later, Donizetti turned against Merelli after unsatisfactory productions of his operas at the Kärntnertor Theatre.

Meanwhile, in spring 1839, Merelli had summoned Giuseppe Verdi, who was having trouble staging his first opera, Oberto, and, after saying that he had heard favourable reports about the music (from Giuseppina Strepponi and Giorgio Ronconi), he offered to stage it in the following season on very generous terms. Verdi accepted with alacrity, the opera was a minor success, and Giovanni Ricordi bought the publishing rights for the score. Merelli himself even had a hand in it, advising Verdi to compose a scena and quartet for Act 2, scene 2.

Merelli now proposed to Verdi a contract for three new operas, and Verdi accepted it. The first, Un giorno di regno, was "an unqualified disaster", but the second, Nabucco, originally offered by Merelli to Otto Nicolai, was a triumph, as was I Lombardi in 1843. Giovanna d'Arco (1845) was the last of Verdi's operas to be mounted by Merelli, but, although it was a success, there were problems during rehearsals with inadequate scenery and costumes and an orchestra that was too small. The press was lukewarm, and Merelli was negotiating with Ricordi about the sale of the full score behind Verdi's back. The composer swore that he would never again speak to Merelli or his staff, nor would he ever set foot again on the stage of la Scala.

== Later life ==
When the 1848 revolution broke out, Merelli was suspected of spying for Radetsky, and he spent some time in Vienna after leaving La Scala. In 1861 he returned to Milan and again took charge of the opera house, but in 1863, after losing much of his money, he retired to the Bergamo area. Despite his generosity, his sharp artistic and financial practices led many people to distrust him. He died in Milan. His son, Eugenio (1825–1882) organised tours to European cities such as Edinburgh, Venice, Vienna, Paris, Moscow (according to Tchaikovsky's articles from the early 1870s) and probably St Petersburg.

== Libretti by Merelli ==
Year	Title	Composer	Genre
1816	L'idolo Birmanno	Paolo Brambilla	
1818	Lanassa (with Gaetano Rossi)	Simon Mayr	melodramma eroico
1818	Alfredo il grande	Simon Mayr	melodramma serio
1818	Enrico di Borgogna	Gaetano Donizetti	opera semiseria
1818	Una follia	Gaetano Donizetti	farsa
1818	Il lupo d'Ostenda	Nicola Vaccai	opera semiseria
1820-21	Le nozze in villa	Gaetano Donizetti	opera buffa
1821	Samuele	Simon Mayr	oratorio
1822	Zoraida di Granata	Gaetano Donizetti	opera seria
1824	Pietro il grande, ossia Un geloso alla tortura	Nicola Vaccai	opera buffa
1824	La pastorella feudataria	Nicola Vaccai	opera semiseria
1826	Il precipizio, ossia Le fucine di Norvegia	Nicola Vaccai	melodramma semiseria
1829	Don Desiderio ovvero Il disperato per ecceso di buon cuore	Francesco Morlacchi	opera buffa
1851	Emma, ossia Il protettore invisible	Julius Benoni (1832–62?)	
