= Golden Stage Cross =

Lithuanian award

The Golden Stage Cross (Lithuanian: Auksinis scenos kryžius, ASK) is the annual highest award for theatre in Lithuania. It is awarded on the World Theatre Day (March 27) usually for theatrical works performed during the previous year, but also as a lifetime achievement award.

Initially the theatre award was established in 1992. During 1995-2002 it consisted of a statuette of St. Christopher and known as the "Kristoforas" award. Since 2002 it was supplemented by a small cash prize. The Golden Stage Cross was established by the Decree of the Ministry of Culture of Lithuania on November 13, 2008. The award includes a commemorative pendant, the "Golden Stage Cross" and a monetary award in the amount of 55 "basic social benefits" (2,530 EUR in 2022). At most 17 awards are to be issued annually. It was preceded by several other Lithuanian theatre awards.

Since the establishment the award produced several controversies related to its criteria.
