= Geltrude Righetti =

Italian opera singer

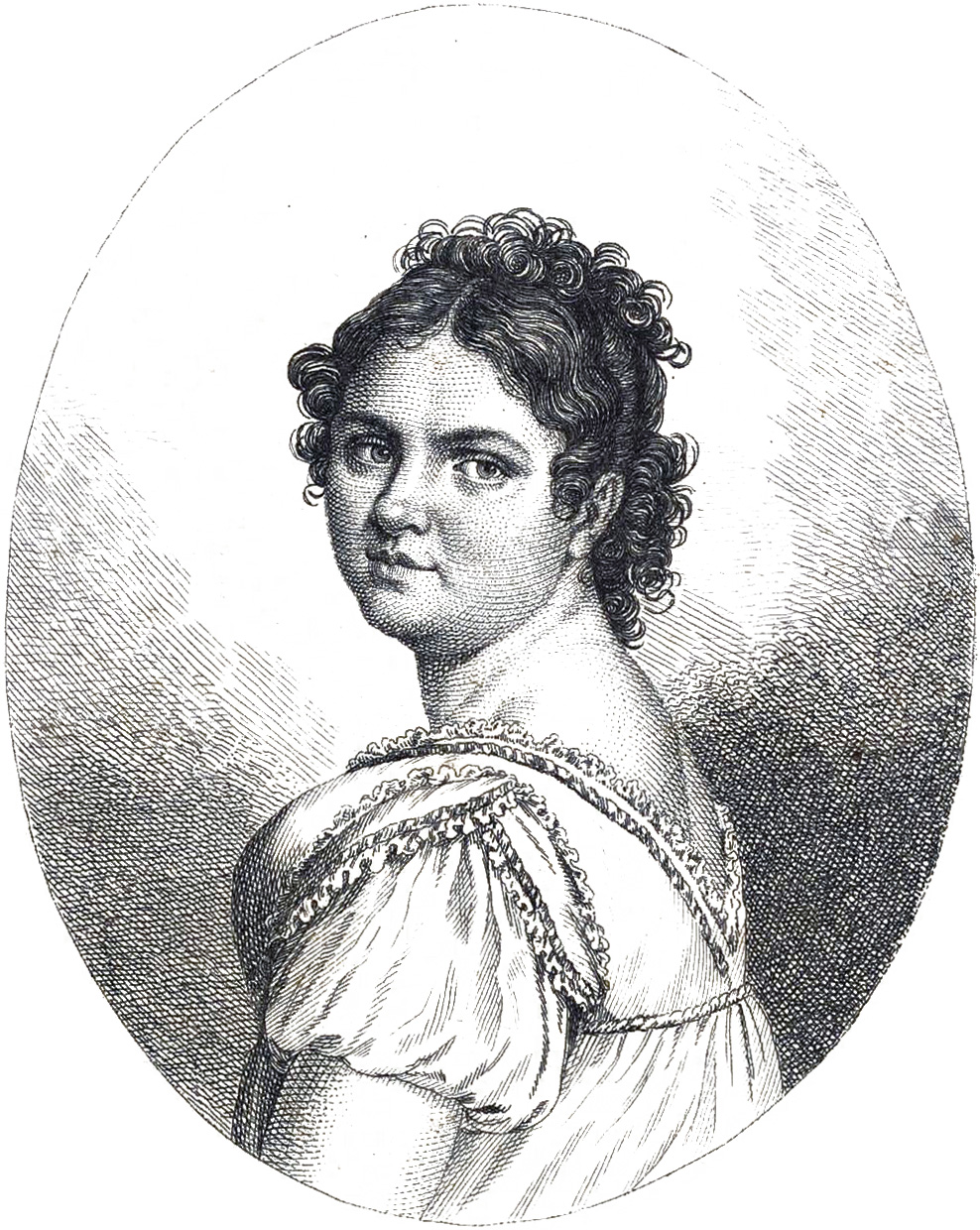
Geltrude Righetti

Geltrude Righetti (26 December 1789 – 24 April 1862) was an Italian contralto closely associated with the operas of Gioachino Rossini. (Her name is also sometimes given as Giorgi-Righetti or Righetti-Giorgi, Giorgi being the name of her husband.)

== Life and career ==
Born in Bologna, she also studied and made her debut there in 1814. The following year, she created the important role of Rosina in The Barber of Seville, and in 1817, she was the first heroine of La Cenerentola, both in Rome. Her career was short, and she retired from the stage in 1822. She died in Bologna in 1862.

== Response to Stendhal ==
In 1823, in response to an article by Stendhal, she wrote her memoir entitled Cenni di una donna già cantante sopra il Maestro Rossini..., which includes an account of the première of The Barber of Seville.

== Sources ==
- Cagli, Bruno (1992), 'Righetti, Geltrude' in The New Grove Dictionary of Opera, ed. Stanley Sadie (London) ISBN 0-333-73432-7. Also at Oxford Music Online (subscription required).
- Righetti-Giorgi, Geltrude (1823). Cenni di una donna già cantante [Gertrude (sic) Righetti-Giorgi] sopra il maestro Rossini in risposta a ciò che ne scrisse nella state dell'anno 1822 il giornalista inglese in Parigi, etc. Bologna. OCLC 503729958. [A reply to an article entitled "Rossini," signed Alceste, i.e. M.H. Beyle [Stendhal], in The Paris monthly review of British and continental literature, vol. 1 (BnF Catalogue général : Notice de périodique)].
- Warrack, John and West, Ewan (1992), The Oxford Dictionary of Opera, 782 pages, ISBN 0-19-869164-5.
