= Teatro Goldoni (Venice) =

Opera house in Venice, Italy

Coordinates: 45°26′11″N 12°20′7″E

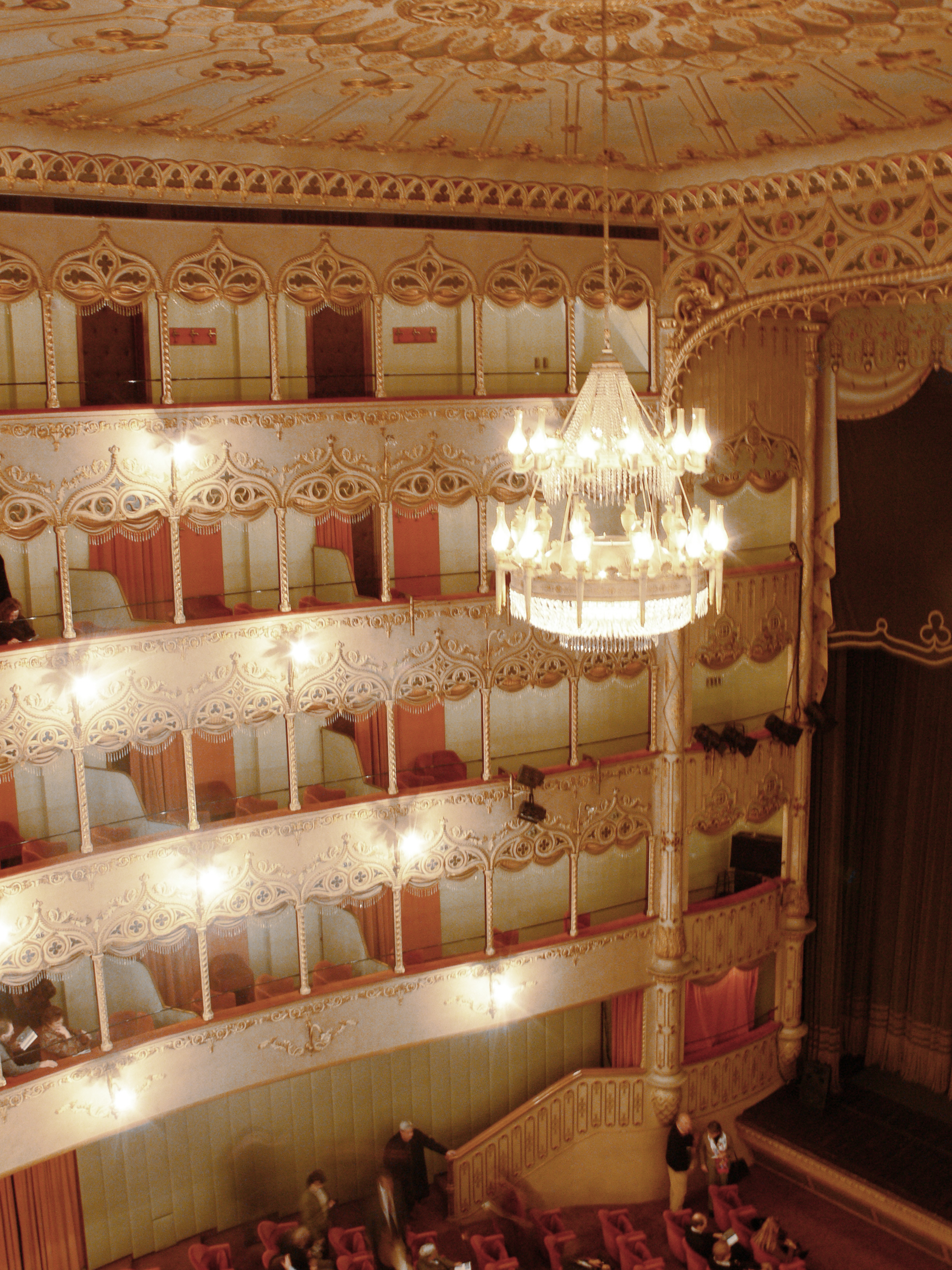
Interior of the Teatro Vendramin, now Teatro Goldoni; the present building dates from the 1720s.

Teatro Goldoni, formerly Teatro San Luca and Teatro Vendramin di San Salvatore, is one of the opera houses and theatres of Venice which today is the home of the Teatro Stabile del Veneto. The theatre building is located near the Rialto Bridge in the historic center of Venice.

== History ==
All the main Venetian theatres were owned by important patrician families; combining business with pleasure in the Italian city with the most crowded and competitive theatrical culture. When most opera in Europe was still being put on by courts, "economic prospects and a desire for exhibitionistic display", as well a decline in their traditional overseas trading, attracted the best Venetian families to invest in the theatre during the 17th century. Europe's first dedicated public and commercial opera house was the Teatro Tron from 1637.

The Grimani, with whom the Vendramin often inter-married, were dominant, owning what is now called the Teatro Malibran, then called the Teatro San Giovanni Grisostomo, as well as the Teatro San Benedetto and other houses. The Veniers owned La Fenice, still the main opera house.

=== Teatro San Luca ===
The Vendramin owned the important Teatro di San Luca or Teatro Vendramin or Teatro San Salvatore, founded in 1622 in the San Salvatore, or in Venetian dialect San Salvador district, later renamed the Teatro Apollo, and since 1875 called the Teatro Goldoni, which still thrives as the city's main theatre for plays, now in a building of the 1720s. The Teatro San Luca was rebuilt in the 1720s and renamed the Teatro Apollo. This building survives today. In the age of Carlo Goldoni, the greatest Venetian dramatist, only the San Luca and the Malibran still put on spoken drama, and his desertion of the Grimani for the Vendramins at San Luca in 1752 was a major event in the theatrical history of the period, ushering in perhaps his finest period, in which as well as his comedies, he played a significant role in the development of the opera buffa. The Vendramins, who had considerable direct involvement in the management of the theatre, had a sometimes uneasy relationship with him, arguing over money and the style of his plays, until he left for Paris in 1761, as a result of a dispute with his rival, Carlo Gozzi. However the Vendramin did not take their involvement as far as Vincenzo Grimani, who was a cardinal and opera librettist.

The theatre had many changes and renovations due to fire or structural failures. Among them the most important was by architect and set designer Giuseppe Borsato in 1818, and the redecoration of the rooms by Francesco Bagnara, then art director at La Fenice in 1833. In 1826 the theatre had been the first in Italy to install gas lighting. It is a traditional 18th Century Italian theater, with an auditorium in four tiers of boxes and galleries, with a total capacity of 800 seats. The stage is 12 metres (39 feet) wide and 11 metres (36 feet) deep with an iron lattice.

=== Teatro Goldoni ===
In 1875 during the celebrations of the birth of the playwright the theatre was renamed the Teatro Goldoni at the instigation of Angelo Moro Lin] with the backing Regina De Marchi widow of the Vendramin family.

=== Teatro Stabile del Veneto "Carlo Goldoni" ===
The theatre remained in the hands of the descendants of the Vendramin until 1957. The archives of the Teatro Vendramin', now held in the museum that was Goldoni's house, are increasingly being used by historians. The theatre was closed after the Second World War because it was unsafe, and dispossessed in 1957. After a lengthy restoration and renovation to improve capacity and services it reopened in 1979. The first performance was La Locandiera by Goldoni.

The theatre is home to a prose season organized by the Teatro Stabile del Veneto "Carlo Goldoni", as well as children's theater, opera, concerts, ballets and other events.

== See also ==
- Music of Venice
