= Béatrice Uria-Monzon =

French mezzo-soprano (1963–2025)

- Born: 28 December 1963; Agen, Lot-et-Garonne, France
- Died: 19 July 2025 (aged 61); Saint-Hilaire-de-Lusignan, Lot-et-Garonne, France
- Occupation: Operatic mezzo-soprano
- Years active: 1987–2022
- Children: 1
- Awards: Légion d'honneur; Ordre national du Mérite; Ordre des Arts et des Lettres
- Website: www.beatrice-uriamonzon.com

Béatrice Uria-Monzon (28 December 1963 – 19 July 2025) was a French mezzo-soprano. Her signature role was Bizet's Carmen, performed first in 1993 at the Opéra Bastille and then at leading opera houses especially in France, but also at the Teatro Colón in Buenos Aires, the Metropolitan Opera in New York City and La Scala in Milan. She focused on French repertoire, including Charlotte in Massenet's Werther and other of the composer's heroines, and Béatrice in Béatrice et Bénédict and Marguerite in la Damnation de Faust, both by Berlioz. She also portrayed characters from the Italian repertoire, such as Eboli in Verdi's Don Carlos and Santuzza in Mascagni's Cavalleria rusticana, later also including soprano roles such as Puccini's Tosca. She appeared in world premieres including Luca Francesconi's Trompe-la-mort in Paris in 2017.

== Life and career ==
=== Early life and education ===
Uria-Monzon was born in Agen near Bordeaux on 28 December 1963, the daughter of the Spanish painter Antonio Uria Monzón and his French wife, Anne-Marie Diar. She grew up with five siblings. As a teenager, she listened to Supertramp and Cat Stevens, played classical guitar and sang with a bossa nova group. She attended the secondary school Joseph Chaumié and the Bernard Palissy d'Agen High School. She went for a second baccalauréat at the St Jean de Lectoure high school in Gers where she was introduced to singing in the choir led by Roland Fornerod. He was an opera lover, and it became her passion.

Uria-Monzon studied art history at the University of Bordeaux and voice at the Conservatoire de Bordeaux with Monique de Pondeau and at the Centre national d'insertion professionnelle des artistes lyriques of Marseille with Pali Marinov for two years. She studied further at the École d'art lyrique of the Paris Opera, where she already appeared on stage in 1987 as Feodor in Mussorgsky's Boris Godunov.

=== Career ===
She performed in concert in 1988 and made her official stage debut as Chérubino in Mozart's Le nozze di Figaro at the Opéra national de Lorraine in 1989. She earned recognition when she appeared as Smeraldine in Prokofiev's The Love for Three Oranges at both the Opéra National de Lyon and the Aix-en-Provence Festival. Her first lead roles were in 1990 the title role of Mignon by Ambroise Thomas at Avignon Opera and Charlotte in Massenet's Werther at the Rouen Opera. She appeared in 1991 as Béatrice in Béatrice et Bénédict by Berlioz at the Théâtre du Capitole in Toulouse, in 1992 as the Second Lady in Mozart's Die Zauberflöte at the Grand Théâtre de Bordeaux and as Marguerite in la Damnation de Faust by Berlioz at both the Opéra Royal de Wallonie and the Bregenzer Festspiele.

Uria-Monzon became known for her numerous performances of the title role of Bizet's Carmen, portraying her first at the Opéra Bastille in 1993, directed by José Luis Gómez. He was impressed by her approach to the role that she described as "very sober, even hieratic" physically, "and as nuanced as possible musically". Fighting clichés, she gave the character tragic destiny. She analysed: "La Habanera makes no sense if you sing it in a sexy way, on the contrary, it finds its full power when approached from a meditative and more dreamy angle." She repeated the role in Paris in 1997, 1998, 1999 and 2002. She played Carmen several times in the 1990s: in 1994 at the Grand Théâtre de Bordeaux and the Teatro Colón in Buenos Aires; in 1995 at the Opéra Royal de Wallonie, the Antibes Festival, the Arena di Verona and the Opéra de Saint-Étienne; in 1996 at the Teatro Massimo in Palermo and the Teatro Regio in Turin; in 1997 in Toulouse; and in 1998 at the Chorégies d'Orange, She made her debut at the Metropolitan Opera in New York City again as Carmen. Anthony Tommasini wrote for the New York Times, that her voice was dusky and rich, "quite sizable when she unleashes a climactic high note", but weak in the low range. He described her performance as a "steamy interpretation", noting that she "has what it takes to be an exceptional Carmen". She portrayed Carmen at the Vienna State Opera in 1998 alongside José Cura and in 2000 alongside Sergej Larin, in 2000 also at the Houston Opera, and in 2001/02 at the Bavarian State Opera in Munich.

After a 2012 DVD recording of Carmen, with Roberto Alagna as José, directed by Calixto Bieito and conducted by Marc Piollet, a reviewer from Opera Forum noted:

She exudes class. Deeply human and natural, she conveys a sense of distinguished boredom whenever one of her lovers no longer pleases her; the close-ups serve her particularly well, capturing her every expression, and all without a hint of vulgarity; we are a long way from the usual hussies... She is completely immersed in the staging and shows that, after playing this role in so many different productions for over twenty years, she remains one of the best Carmens, even if her first aria is always a little difficult to get going.

Uria-Monzon performed as Eboli in Don Carlos in 1998 at the Theatre de Wallonie, in 2001 as Giulietta in Offenbach's Les contes d'Hoffmann and the title role of Massenet's Hérodiade. In 2007 she appeared as Venus in Wagner's Tannhäuser, at the Bastille Opera, with Stephen Gould in the title role and conducted by Seiji Ozawa. She portrayed Santuzza in Mascagni's Cavalleria rusticana in Orange in 2009, alongside Alagna as Turiddu and conducted by Georges Prêtre. In 2012, she appeared as Puccini's Tosca at the Avignon Opera, entering soprano repertoire. She repeated the role at La Scala in Milan in 2015, alongside Fabio Sartori as Cavaradossi and Željko Lučić as Scarpia, directed by Luc Bondy and conducted by Carlo Rizzi. In Paris, she took part in the world premiere there of Luca Francesconi's Trompe-la-mort in April 2017, conducted by Susanna Mälkki, in the role of Comtesse de Sérizy. In 2018 she performed the role of Lady Macbeth in Verdi's Macbeth in Toulouse, conducted by Daniel Oren, and first performed the title role of Cilea's Adriana Lecouvreur. In 2020, she appeared as Queen Marguerite in Boesman's Yvonne, princesse de Bourgogne in Paris and as Elena in Boito's Mefistofele in Toulouse. Her last performance at the Paris Opéra was as Dona Honoria, Dona Isabelle and La Religieuse in Marc-André Dalbavie's Soulier de satin in 2021. She appeared as Eurydice in the world premiere of Zad Moultaka's Hémon at the Opéra national du Rhin in Strasbourg in March 2021. She portrayed the title role of Ponchielli's La Gioconda for the opening performance of the 2021/22 season in Toulouse. A reviewer described her interpretation as emotional and tragic, "with dark tones full of character in her powerful mezzo". She appeared there in 2022 as the Foreign Princess in Dvořák's Rusalka, conducted by Frank Beermann.

She appeared especially in French roles, including Massenet's Chimene in Le Cid, Dulcinée in Don Quichotte, Anita in La Navarraise and Cléopâtre, both Cassandre and Didon in Les Troyens by Berlioz, Mère Marie in Poulenc's Dialogues of the Carmelites and Dalila in Samson and Delilah by Saint-Saëns. In the Italian repertoire, she also performed Léonor in Donizetti's La Favorite and Amnéris in Verdi's Aida. She also appeared as Ghita in Zemlinsky's Der Zwerg and as Judith in Bartók's Bluebeard's Castle, in Hungarian.

In recitals, she sang especially mélodies by Berlioz, Henri Duparc, Gabriel Fauré and Maurice Ravel. In 2021, she released a recital CD named Assoluta of Italian soprano arias by Bellini, Cilea, Giordano, Mascagni, Ponchielli, Puccini, and Verdi. For this, she was accompanied by the orchestra of the Teatro Lirico Giuseppe Verdi conducted by Fabrizio Maria Carminati. A reviewer noted, regarding the first aria, Vissi d'arte from Tosca, that she connected closely with the character, with "her dark, smoky tone and her rapid slide up to her highest notes".

=== Personal life ===
Uria-Monzon was married; the couple had a daughter. She was patron of a child protection association, La Mouette, and supported artistic projects in her home region. Uria-Monzon, who had been ill for some time, died from cancer, at her home in Saint-Hilaire-de-Lusignan, Lot-et-Garonne, France, on 19 July 2025, aged 61.

== Awards ==
- 2006: Chevalier Ordre national du Mérite
- 2009: Chevalier of te Légion d'honneur
- 2018: Officer of the Ordre national du Mérite; 2006 : chevalière
- 2021: Commander of the Ordre des Arts et des Lettres
- (31349) Uria-Monzon, an asteroid, was named after her.

== Discography ==
Complete operas

- Bizet, Carmen (Carmen), Orchestre national Bordeaux-Aquitaine, cond. Alain Lombard, Naïve OCLC 840087461
- Berlioz, La Damnation de Faust, Israel Philharmonic Orchestra, Transylvania State Philharmonic Choir, Gary Bertini, Hellicon
- Massenet: Werther (Charlotte), Orchestre national de Lille, cond. Jean-Claude Casadesus, Naxos Records OCLC 811331677
- Prokofiev: The Love for Three Oranges (Sméraldine), orchestre du Opéra de Lyon, cond. Kent Nagano, Virgin ClassicsArthaus OCLC 315079364
- Lalo: Fiesque (Julie), Opéra Orchestre national Montpellier, cond. Alain Altinoglu, Deutsche Grammophon

Other vocal works

- Berlioz: Cantates, La Mort de Cléopâtre, Orchestre national de Lille, cond. Casadesus, Naxos OCLC 58530826
- Franck: Rédemption (Archangel), Lambert Wilson (narrator), Orfeón Donostiarra, Orchestre national du Capitole de Toulouse, cond. Michel Plasson, Musical Heritage Society
- Ravel: Cantates pour le prix de Rome, Alcyone, orchestre du Théâtre du Capitole, cond. Michel Plasson, EMI OCLC 1117222656
- Assoluta, Italian soprano arias, Orchestra of Teatro Lirico Giuseppe Verdi, cond. Fabrizio Maria Carminati, Aparte, 2021 OCLC 1262662899

== Videography ==
- Bizet: Carmen (Carmen), orchestra of the Liceu, cond. Marc Piollet, C Major OCLC 762763098
- Offenbach: The Tales of Hoffmann (Giulietta), Orchestre de l'Opéra national de Paris, cond. Jesus Lopez-Cobos, TDK OCLC 314613580
- Prokofiev: The Love for Three Oranges (Fata Morgana), Orchestre de l'Opéra national de Paris, cond. Sylvain Cambreling, TDK OCLC 184898340
- Thomas, Hamlet (Gertrude), orchestre of the Liceu, cond. Bertrand de Billy, EMI OCLC 56992293
- Wagner: Tannhäuser (Venus), with Peter Seiffert (Tannhäuser) and Petra-Maria Schnitzer (Elisabeth), orchestra of the Liceu, cond. Sebastian Weigle, C Major (DVD and Blu-ray). OCLC 871419738
