= Rita (opera) =

Opera by Gaetano Donizetti

- Opéra comique by Gaetano Donizetti
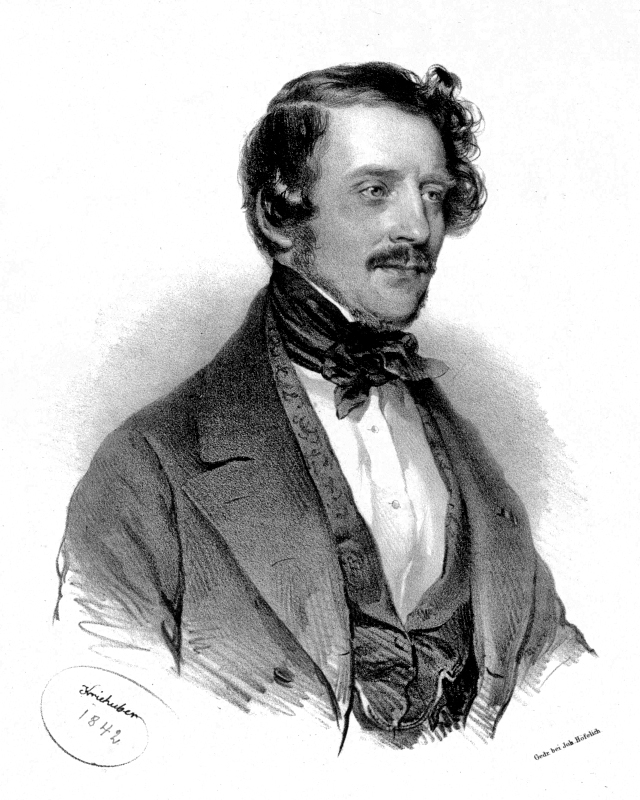
- Donizetti, in an 1842 portrait by Joseph Kriehuber
- Native title: Deux Hommes et une femme
- Librettist: Gustave Vaëz
- Language: French
- Premiere: 7 May 1860; Opéra-Comique, Paris

Deux Hommes et une femme (Two Men and a Woman), also known as Rita, is an opéra comique in one act, composed by Gaetano Donizetti to a French libretto by Gustave Vaëz. The opera, a domestic comedy consisting of eight musical numbers connected by spoken dialogue, was completed in 1841. Never performed in Donizetti's lifetime, it premiered posthumously at the Opéra-Comique in Paris on 7 May 1860.

== Composition history ==
In 1841, while Donizetti was in Paris waiting for the libretto to be completed for a commission by La Scala, he had a chance encounter with Gustave Vaëz, who had co-written the libretti for two of his earlier operas, Lucie de Lammermoor (the French version of Lucia di Lammermoor) and La favorite. He asked Vaëz if he could provide a libretto for a short opera to keep him busy while waiting for the La Scala project to advance. Vaëz quickly created Deux hommes et une femme (Two Men and a Woman), a comic piece in one act consisting of eight musical numbers connected by spoken dialogue. According to Vaëz, Donizetti completed the score in eight days. However, the Opéra-Comique rejected it and Donizetti then had the libretto translated into Italian for an intended performance at the Teatro del Fondo in Naples. Following the death of the Teatro del Fondo's impresario, Domenico Barbaja, the Naples performance fell through. The score, still unperformed, was found in Donizetti's effects when he died in 1848.

== Performance history ==
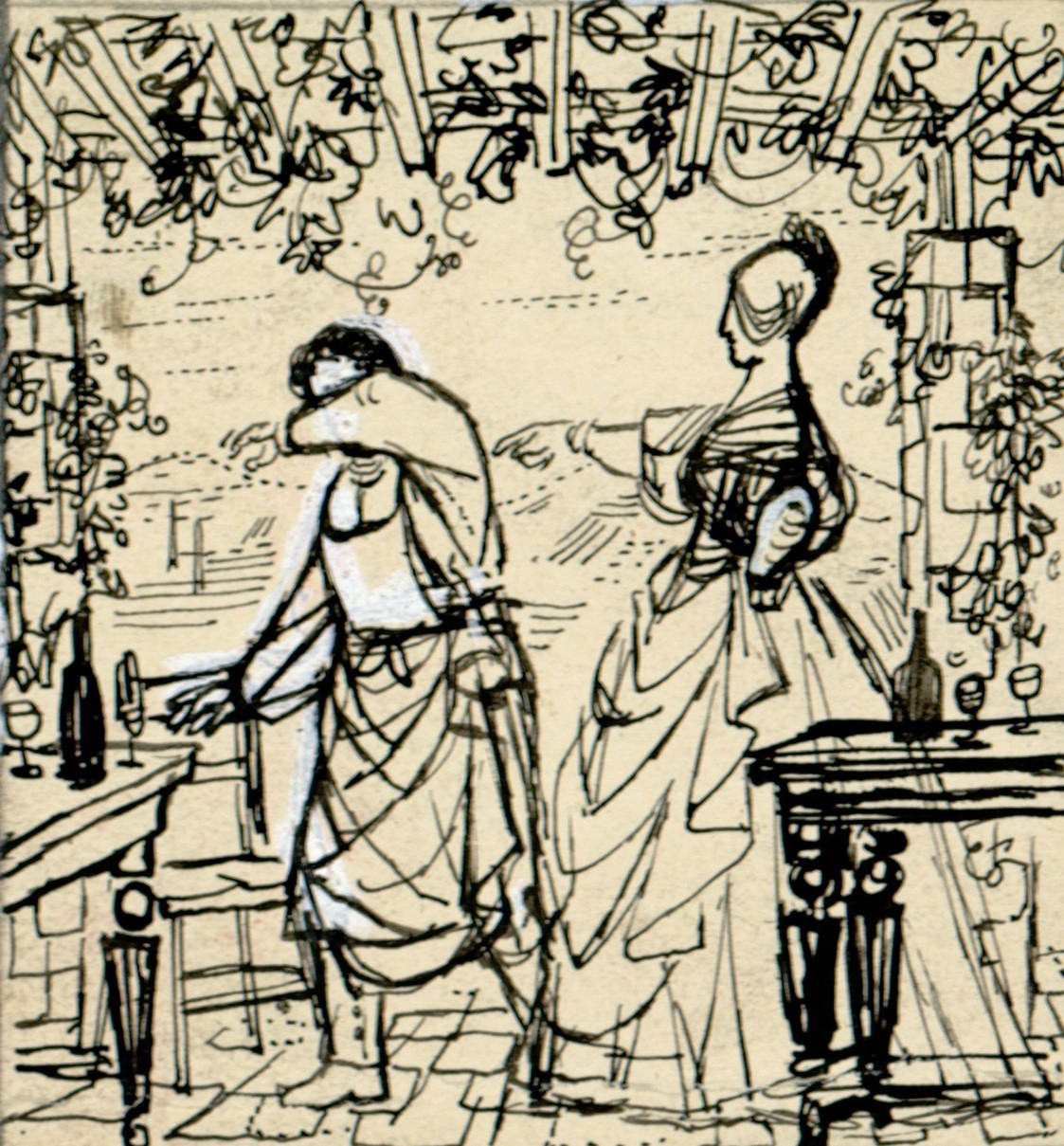
Disegno per copertina di libretto, drawing for Rita (undated).

On 7 May 1860, twelve years after the composer's death, the opera premiered at the Opéra-Comique with the title Rita, ou Le mari battu (Rita, or The Beaten Husband).

Although not a great success at the time and only sporadically performed in the 100 years following its premiere, it was revived and warmly received first in Rome in 1955 and then at the Piccola Scala in Milan in 1965. In the ensuing 50 years Rita (both in the original French and its Italian translation) has become one of Donizetti's most frequently performed operas.

In 2008 Casa Ricordi published a new critical edition of the score, which restored the original spoken French dialogue and removed the changes which had been made to the work for its posthumous premiere and in subsequent revivals. The original French version was reconstructed by the Italian musicologists, Paolo A. Rossini and Francesco Bellotto, from a recently discovered manuscript libretto with autograph annotations by Donizetti.

The opera was presented in concert form by the New Century Chamber Orchestra and San Francisco Opera's Adler Fellows between 12 and 16 February 2014 in four Bay Area locations. The Berliner Operngruppe presented the opera's French-language version semi-staged at the Konzerthaus Berlin on 1 September 2021, with music director Felix Krieger conducting and Elbenita Kajtazi, Alasdair Kent and Pablo Ruiz singing the principal roles.

In March 2014 Opera Rara released Rita in the original French. Conducted by Artistic Director Sir Mark Elder, this was the first studio recording of the newly restored critical edition of the score. It features Katarina Karnéus as Rita, Barry Banks as Pepé and Christopher Maltman as Gasparo.

== Roles ==
Role	Voice type	Premiere Cast, 7 May 1860 (Conductor: - )
Rita, landlady of the tavern	soprano	Constance-Caroline Faure-Lefèbvre
Beppe, her husband	tenor	Victor Warot
Gaspar, her former husband	baritone	Barielle
Bortolo, a servant	spoken role	Jean-Baptiste Faure

== Synopsis ==
Time: 18th century
Place: "The action takes place at an inn on the road from Genoa to Turin."

At an inn belonging to Rita, the tyrannical and abusive wife of the timid Peppe, the couple finds that their lives are thrown into turmoil with the unexpected arrival of Gaspar, Rita's first husband, whom all believed to have drowned. In reality, Gaspar had run away to Canada. Believing that Rita has died in a fire, Gaspar has returned to obtain her death certificate so that he can remarry. When the two meet, Gaspar tries to run away. Peppe, however, sees this as an opportunity to free himself from Rita's slaps because Gaspar is her legitimate husband. The two men agree to a game such that whoever wins has to remain with Rita. Both try to lose, but ultimately the winner is Gaspar. Yet Rita, who had suffered frequently from the hand of Gaspar, refuses to return to be his wife. Gaspar, pretending he has lost the hand, induces Peppe to declare his love for Rita and his firm intention to remain as her husband. The crafty Gaspar, having achieved his purpose, takes his leave from the reconciled couple.

== Recordings ==
Year	Cast (Rita, Peppe, Gaspar)	Conductor, Opera House and Orchestra	Label
1991	Adelina Scarabelli, Pietro Ballo, Alessandro Corbelli	Federico Amendola; Orchestra da Camera Siciliana	Audio CD: Nuova Era; Cat: 7045
2001	Teresa di Bari, Walter Omaggio, Paolo Bordogna	Carlo Palleschi; Orchestra della Fondazione I.C.O. «Tito Schipa» di Lecce	Audio CD: Kicco Classic; Cat: KC 079
2014	Katarina Karnéus, Barry Banks, Christopher Maltman	Sir Mark Elder; The Hallé	Audio CD: Opera Rara; Cat: ORC50
