= Stiffelio =

Opera by Giuseppe Verdi

- Opera by Giuseppe Verdi
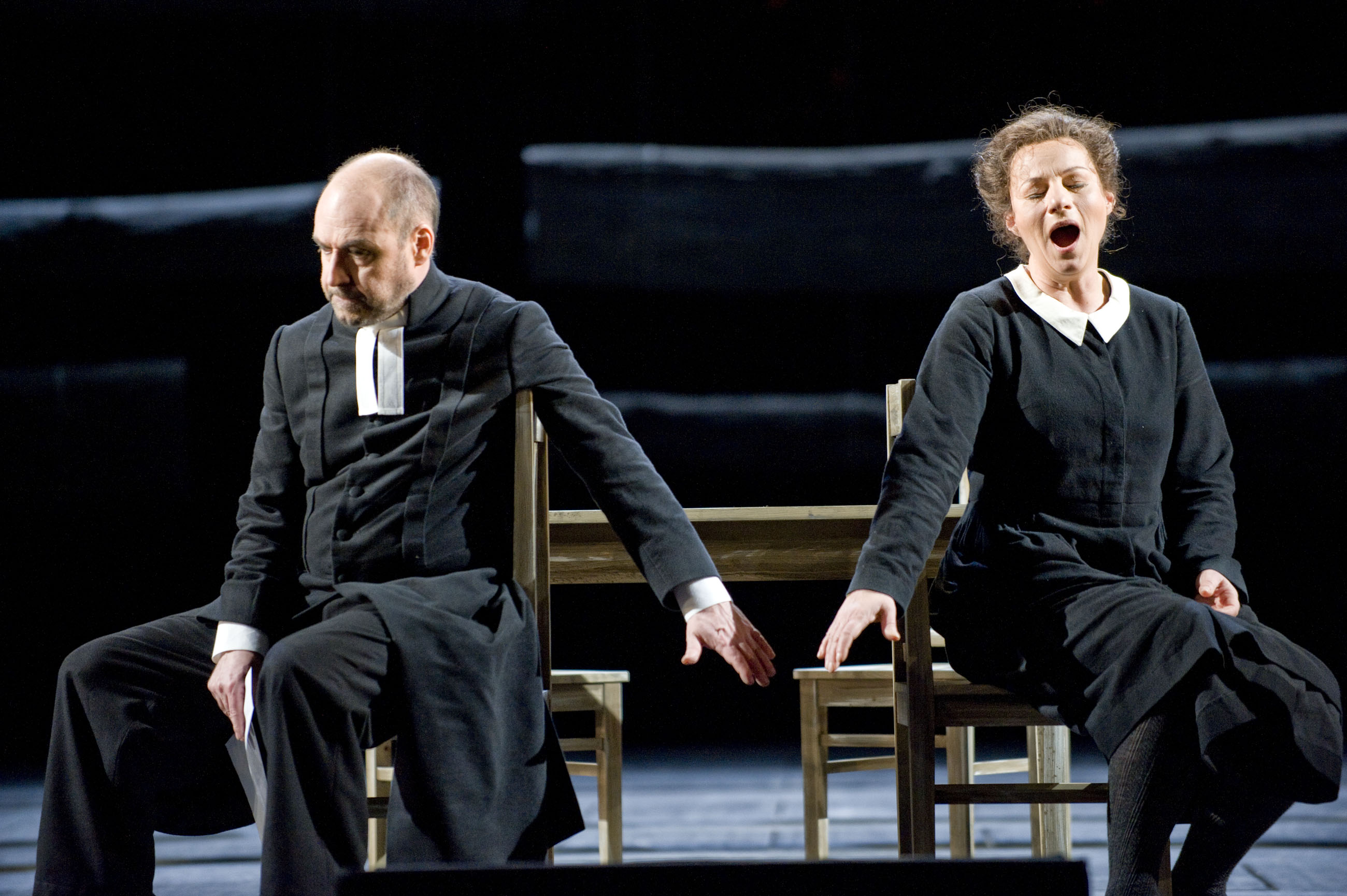
- Lars Cleveman as Stiffelio and Lena Nordin as Lina, Royal Swedish Opera 2011
- Librettist: Francesco Maria Piave
- Language: Italian
- Based on: Le pasteur, ou L'évangile et le foyer by Émile Souvestre and Eugène Bourgeois
- Premiere: 16 November 1850; Teatro Grande, Trieste

Stiffelio is an opera in three acts by Giuseppe Verdi, from an Italian libretto by Francesco Maria Piave. The origin of this was the novel Le pasteur d’hommes, by Émile Souvestre, which was published in 1838. This was adapted into the French play Le pasteur, ou L'évangile et le foyer by Souvestre together with Eugène Bourgeois. (Its premiere was on 10 February 1849 at the Théâtre de la Porte Saint-Martin in Paris.) That play was in turn translated into Italian by Gaetano Vestri as Stifellius; this formed the basis of Piave's libretto.

Verdi's experience in Naples for Luisa Miller had not been a good one and he returned home to Busseto to consider the subject for his next opera. The idea for Stiffelio came from his librettist and, entering into a contract with his publisher, Ricordi, he agreed to proceed, leaving the decision as to the location of the premiere to Ricordi. This became the Teatro Grande (now the Teatro Comunale Giuseppe Verdi) in Trieste and, in spite of difficulties with the censors which resulted in cuts and changes, the opera – Verdi's 16th – was first performed on 16 November 1850.

== Composition history ==
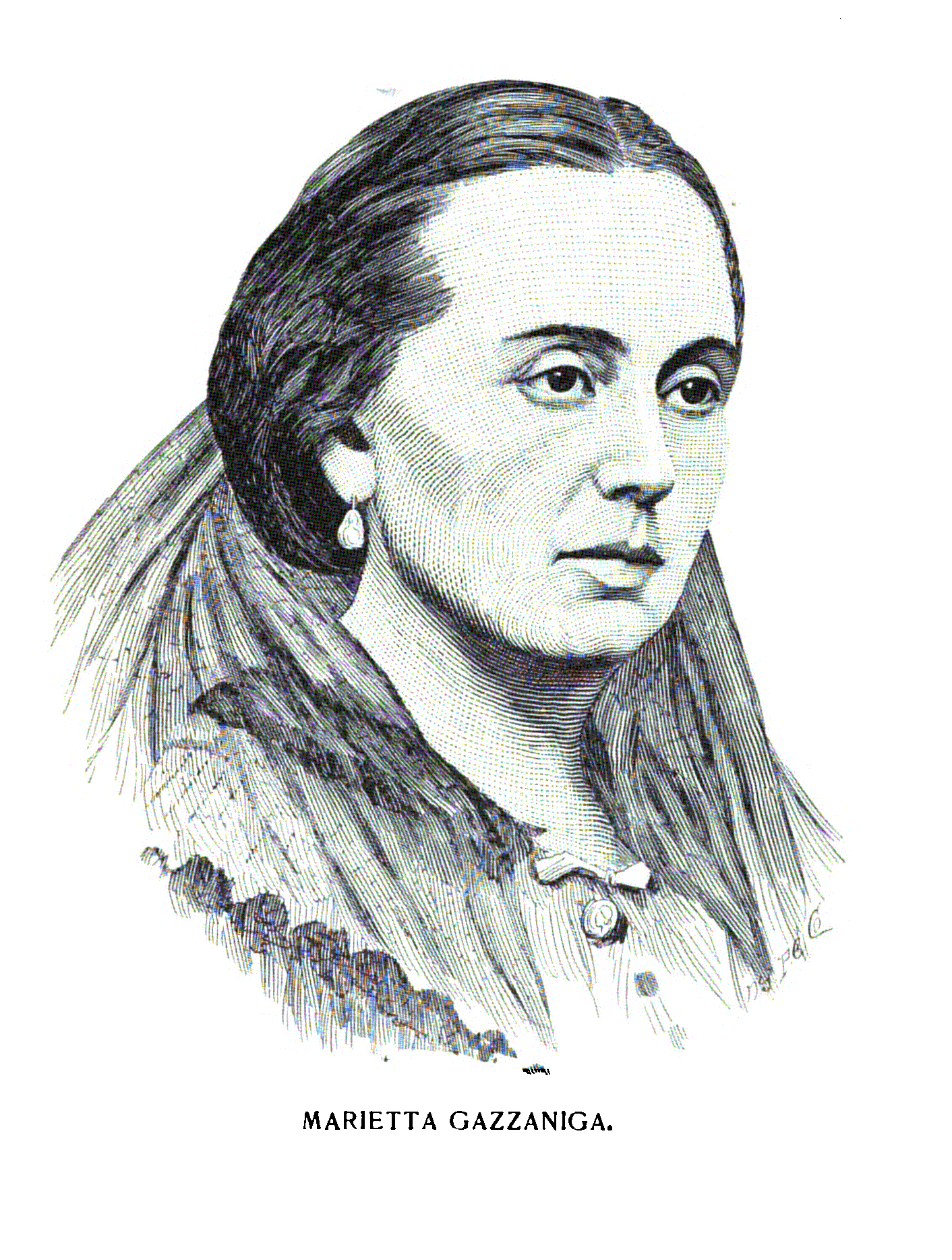
Soprano Marietta Gazzaniga sang Lina

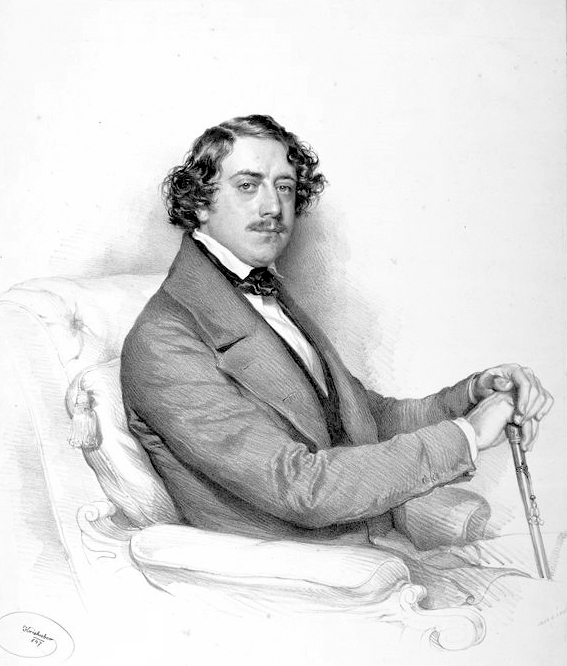
Baritone Filippo Colini sang Stankar

Before Luisa Miller was staged in Naples, Verdi had offered the San Carlo company another work for 1850, with the new opera to be based on Victor Hugo's Le roi s'amuse from a libretto to be written by Salvadore Cammarano. But his experience with Luisa was such that he decided not to pursue this, and approached his publisher, Giulio Ricordi, with the proposal that he should work with the librettist on the possibility of an opera, Re Lear, which would be based on Shakespeare's King Lear and which had long been on Verdi's mind. However, by June 1850 it became clear that the subject was beyond Cammarano's ability to fashion into a libretto, and so it was abandoned. However, the commitment to Ricordi remained.

Verdi had returned to Busseto with many ideas in mind, among them a new opera for Venice, which included a request for a draft scenario from Piave based on Victor Hugo's Le roi s'amuse. plus several others of interest to him. However, it was the librettist who came back with the suggestion of Stifellius, and between March and May 1850 discussions with Piave proceeded until a sketch of Stiffelio was received. Verdi responded enthusiastically, proclaiming it "good and exciting" and asking: "Is this Stiffelio a historical person? In all the history I've read, I don't remember coming across the name." At the same time, it appears that Verdi continued to be fascinated by Le Roi s'amuse, a play which Budden notes as having been banned at its first performance: "it was, politically speaking, dynamite" but he adds that the Venetian censors had allowed Ernani.

Reactions to the choice of subject and how it worked as a libretto and opera have been fairly uniform. Musicologist Roger Parker in Grove describes it as:

A bold choice, a far cry from the melodramatic plots of Byron and Hugo: modern, 'realistic', subjects were unusual in Italian opera, and the religious subject matter seemed bound to cause problems with the censor. [...] The tendency of its most powerful moments to avoid or radically manipulate traditional structures has been much praised.

Budden basically agrees, stating that "[Verdi] was tired of stock subjects; he wanted something with genuinely human, as distinct from melodramatic, interest. [....] Stiffelio had the attraction of being a problem play with a core of moral sensibility; the same attraction, in fact, that led Verdi to La traviata a little later."

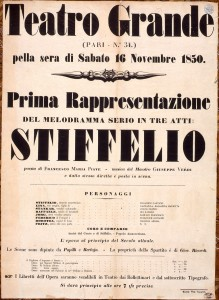
Original poster for Stiffelio, 1850

As Stiffelio moved towards completion, Ricordi decided that it should be performed in Trieste. As the premiere approached, both librettist and composer were called before the president of the theatre commission on 13 November, given that the organization had received demands for changes from the censor, which included a threat to block the production entirely if these were not met. The original story line of Stiffelio, involving as it does a Protestant minister of the church with an adulterous wife, and a final church scene in which he forgives her with words quoted from the New Testament, was impossible to present on the stage, and this created these censorship demands for various reasons: "In Italy and Austrian Trieste ... a married priest was a contradiction in terms. Therefore there was no question of a church in the final scene...."

The changes which were demanded included Stiffelio being referred to not as a minister, but as a "sectarian". Furthermore, in act 3, Lina would not be allowed to beg for confession, plus as Budden notes, "the last scene was reduced to the most pointless banality" whereby Stiffelio is only permitted to preach in general terms. Both men were reluctantly forced to agree to accept the changes.

== Performance history ==
=== The different versions ===
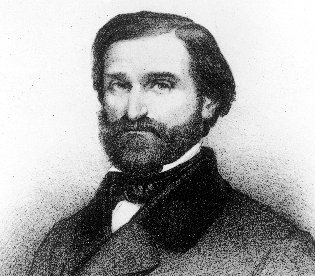
Verdi around 1850

In the introduction to the critical edition prepared in 2003 by Kathleen Hansell, she states quite clearly that "The performance history of Stiffelio as Verdi envisioned it literally began only in 1993."

She might have added "21 October 1993", since this was the occasion when the Metropolitan Opera presented the work based on the discoveries which had been found in the composer's autograph manuscript by musicologist Philip Gossett the previous year and which were eventually included in the critical edition prepared by her for the University of Chicago in 2003.

In setting the context of the re-creation of the opera, Hansell states:

This opera, composed in tandem with Rigoletto and sharing many of its forward-looking characteristics, suffered even more than Rigoletto from the censors' strictures. The story of [the opera...] shocked conservative post-Revolutionary Italian religious and political powers. From its very premiere at Trieste in November 1850, its text was diluted to appease the authorities, making a mockery of the action and thus of Verdi's carefully calibrated music. The libretto was rewritten for subsequent revivals, and even some of Verdi's music was dropped.

Hansell's statement establishes what happened to Verdi's opera in the years between the 1850 premiere and October 1993. To begin with, a revised version of the opera, entitled Guglielmo Wellingrode (with the hero a German minister of state), was presented in 1851, without either Verdi or his librettist Piave being responsible for it. In fact, when asked by impresario Alessandro Linari in 1852 to create a more suitable ending, Verdi was furious and refused. In addition, it is known that some productions were given in the Iberian peninsula in the 1850s and 1860s.

=== Verdi withdraws Stiffelio in 1856; the autograph disappears ===
As early as 1851, it became clear to Verdi that given the existing censorship throughout Italy, there was no point in Ricordi, his publisher and owner of the rights to the opera, trying to obtain venues for performances before the composer and librettist together had any opportunity to revise and restructure it more acceptably. However, in her research for the critical edition, Hansell notes that in 1856 Verdi angrily withdrew his opera from circulation, reusing parts of the score for his reworked 1857 version, the libretto also prepared by Piave: it was renamed as Aroldo and set in 13th century Anglo-Saxon England and Scotland. It contains a totally new fourth act.

Throughout the rest of the 19th century and for most of the 20th, the Stiffelio autograph was generally presumed to be lost.

=== 20th century performances before October 1993 ===
Hansell is clear on several points regarding any performances between 1856 and October 1993:

All previous modern editions, including the score prepared by Edward Downes and first performed in January 1993 by The Royal Opera company at Covent Garden, were based largely or entirely on secondary sources, such as the early printed vocal score and defective 19th-century manuscript copies of the full score. For the Covent Garden performances, with José Carreras as Stiffelio, Philip Gossett made preliminary corrections of the vocal parts only, based on the newly recovered autograph materials.

Although vocal scores were known, the discovery of a copyist's score at the Naples Conservatory in the 1960s led to a successful revival at the Teatro Regio in Parma in 1968.

A new performing edition, prepared for Bärenreiter from microfilm of the Naples copyist's score, was obtained in order to restore the composer's intentions as far as possible. This was the basis of performances at Naples and Cologne, but it cut material (especially from the act 1 overture and choruses) and it added in sections from Aroldo, which were not in the original score. This became the source of the UK premiere in an English language production given by University College Opera (then the Music Society) in London in 1973. Given that even the original premiere of the work was in a version partly cut by the censors, this production was probably one of the first ever close-to-authentic performances of the work.

The American stage premiere was given by Vincent La Selva and the New York Grand Opera on 4 June 1976 at the Brooklyn Academy of Music with Richard Taylor as Stiffelio and Norma French as Lina. The opera was also given by Sarah Caldwell and the Opera Company of Boston on 17 February 1978.

=== The Stiffelio autograph found; The Met presents the "new" Stiffelio; the critical edition prepared ===
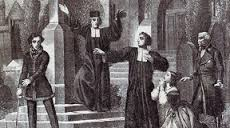
Scene from act 2 of Stiffelio: the confrontation with Raffaele.

In his book, Divas and Scholars, Philip Gossett, the General Editor of the critical editions of the Verdi operas published by the University of Chicago, tells the story of how "to [his] immense joy" the original Verdi materials came to be seen by him in February 1992 when the Carrara Verdi family allowed access to the autograph and to copies of about 60 pages of supplementary sketches. Some aspects of the original Verdi edition were able to be shared with Edward Downes for his 1993 staging in London, but these included only the vocal elements and none of the orchestral fabric, for which Downes' edition relied entirely on a 19th-century copy.

The first complete performance of the new score was given on 21 October 1993 at the Metropolitan Opera house in New York. The production was repeated 16 more times between October 1993 and 1998, at which time a DVD with Plácido Domingo in the title role was released.

In 1985–1986 the Teatro La Fenice in Venice mounted back-to-back productions of Aroldo and Stiffelio (the latter in a version similar to that described above) in conjunction with an international scholarly conference which was held in that city in December 1985.

The 1993 Met production was revived in 2010 with José Cura in the title role and conducted by Domingo. The new critical edition has also been performed at La Scala and in Los Angeles.

The Sarasota Opera presented Stiffelio in 2005 as part of its "Verdi Cycle" of all of the composer's operas. The opera was given in a concert version in London by the Chelsea Opera Group on 8 June 2014 with the role of Lina being sung by Nelly Miricioiu. The Berlin premiere of Stiffelio was conducted by Felix Krieger with Berliner Operngruppe on February 1, 2017, at Konzerthaus Berlin. New productions of the opera were presented by Frankfurt Opera and La Fenice, Venice in 2016, by Teatro Regio di Parma in 2017, at Palacio de Bellas Artes in 2018, and at the Opéra national du Rhin in 2021.

== Roles ==
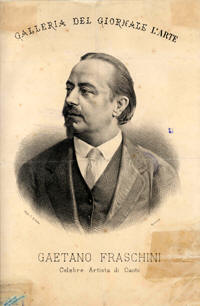
Gaetano Fraschini, the first Stiffelio

Role	Voice type	Premiere Cast, 16 November 1850 (Conductor: -)
Stiffelio, a Protestant minister	tenor	Gaetano Fraschini
Lina, his wife	soprano	Marietta Gazzaniga
Count Stankar, her father, an elderly retired military officer	baritone	Filippo Colini
Raffaele di Leuthold, a friend of the family, supposedly a count, Lina's lover	tenor	Raineri Dei
Jorg, an elderly minister, Stiffelio's spiritual mentor	bass	Francesco Reduzzi
Dorotea, Lina's cousin	mezzo-soprano	Viezzoli De Silvestrini
Federico di Frengel, Lina's cousin	tenor	Giovanni Petrovich

== Synopsis ==
Place: Count Stankar's castle and surrounding environs on the banks of the River Salzach, outside of Salzburg, Austria
Time: first half of the 19th century

=== Act 1 ===
Scene 1: A hall in Count Stankar's castle

Stiffelio, a Protestant minister, is expected to return from a mission. His wife Lina, her father Stankar, the elderly minister Jorg, and Lina's cousins Dorotea and Federico are waiting for him. In addition, there is Raffaele who, unknown to all, is Lina's lover. Stiffelio arrives and recounts a strange story told by Walter the castle boatman (Di qua varcando): eight days earlier, Walter witnessed a man escape from the room of an unidentified woman in the castle by jumping out the window into the river. In his flight, the man dropped a packet of identifying papers, which the boatman recovered and has now given to Stiffelio. Refusing to learn by opening the packet who was involved, he throws the letters into the fire, much to the relief of Lina and Raffaele, the two parties of the incident (Colla cenere disperso). Secretly, Raffaele communicates to Lina that he will leave instructions as where they may next meet in a note placed inside a locked copy of Klopstock's Messiah in the library.

After Stiffelio has been greeted by the local congregation, he and Lina are left alone (Non ha per me un accento – "She has no word for me, not a glance"). He tells her of the sin he has witnessed (Vidi dovunque gemere – "Everywhere I saw virtue groaning and oppressed"), in particular denouncing married women who are unfaithful to their husbands. However, he tells Lina that she reminds him that marital fidelity still exists. Lina, unnerved, asks Stiffelio if he would forgive her if she were unfaithful; Stiffelio says he would not because "forgiveness is easy for an unwounded heart, but hidden within the soul is a treasure which no one can break without being punished". He then notices that her wedding ring, a gift from his deceased mother, is not on her finger. Angrily, he demands to know why (Ah v'appare in fronte scritto – "Ah, clearly written on your brow is the shame that wages war in your heart"), but Stankar arrives to escort him to the celebrations being arranged by his friends. Alone, Lina, filled with remorse, prays to God for forgiveness (A te ascenda, O Dio clemente – "Let my sighs and tears ascend to thee, O merciful God").

Deciding to confess everything to Stiffelio, Lina begins to write to him, but her father enters and grabs the letter, which he reads aloud. Stankar rebukes her (Dite che il fallo a tergere – "Tell him that your heart lacks the strength to wash away your sins") and tells her that if Stiffelio were to discover the truth, then the ensuing despair would kill him. He pressures her to remain silent in order to cover up what she has done and thus preserve appearances and family honor (Ed io pure in faccia agli uomini – "So before the face of mankind I must stifle my anger"). Eventually, Stankar tells her to put on a brave face and hide her grief (Or meco venite – "Come now with me; tears are of no consequence"). Lina reluctantly agrees to remain silent on the matter and the two leave together.

Now Raffaele enters to place the note in the volume of Klopstock's Messiah, as he previously told Lina he was going to. Jorg, hidden, observes this just as Federico arrives to take the volume away, leading him to assume that Raffaele and Federico are collaborating to smuggle letters to an unknown third party.

Scene 2: The banquet hall of Stankar's castle.

A party has been organized to welcome Stiffelio back as the congregants praise him for the love he spreads among the people. Stiffelio enters with Jorg, who tells him he saw a gentleman hiding a note in a locked book. Stiffelio asks who hid the note and Jorg mistakenly points to Federico, who has the copy of Messiah and is now talking to Lina. Stiffelio is lost in thought. Dorotea and Federico ask him what he will preach about in church that evening. He declares that he will preach about Judas and all vile betrayers, seducers who ruin homes for example. He takes the locked book from Federico. Dorotea blurts out that Lina has the key and Stiffelio orders his wife to unlock it. When she refuses, he breaks open the clasp himself and sees the letter. Before he can read it, however, Stankar grabs it and tears it up. Stiffelio is furious with Stankar; Lina begs Stiffelio to strike her but leave her father alone. Stankar tells Raffaele to meet him in the cemetery, while Raffaele pretends indifference. The others wonder what demon invaded Stiffelio's heart to rob them of their serenity.

=== Act 2 ===
A cemetery near the castle

Francesco Maria Piave, librettist of the opera

Lina wanders into the cemetery. She comes across her mother's grave and in desperation once again prays for forgiveness (Ah dagli scanni eterei – "Ah, from among the ethereal thrones, where, blessed, you take your seat"), but Raffaele, having followed her, arrives. She demands that he return her wedding ring and her letters, which he had taken, and then immediately asks him to leave forever (Perder dunque voi volete – "Then you wish to destroy this unhappy, betrayed wretch"). However, Raffaele refuses to leave (Io resto – "I stay").

Stankar arrives, demands that his daughter leave, and challenges Raffaele to a duel. Raffaele initially refuses to fight, but ends up accepting the challenge after Stankar threatens to tell everyone that Raffaele is actually a bastard child, not a Count as he claims. Stiffelio arrives and rebukes them for fighting in a cemetery. There is an attempt at conciliation whereby the minister takes Raffaele's hand with the intention to also take Stankar's and have them shake hands. However, Stankar reveals that Stiffelio has touched the hand of the man who betrayed him! Not quite understanding at first, Stiffelio demands that the mystery be solved. As Lina returns asking her husband to forgive her, Stiffelio begins to comprehend the situation (Ah, no! È impossibile! – "No! It cannot be!").

Enraged and devastated, Stiffelio challenges Raffaele to a duel, but Raffaele refuses. Stiffelio as such decides to simply kill him instead, but as he is about to strike Raffaele, Jorg arrives to summon Stiffelio to the church. Inside the church, the congregation sings a hymn asking for forgiveness, which torments Stiffelio. Filled with conflicting emotions, Stiffelio drops his sword and asks God to inspire his speech to his parishioners, but almost immediately thereafter declares that he can never forgive his wife and curses her. Jorg reminds him that Christ forgave all humanity from the cross; Stiffelio, overwhelmed, faints.

=== Act 3 ===
Scene 1: A room in Count Stankar's castle, the next morning

Alone, Stankar reads a letter he has intercepted, in which Raffaele tells Lina that he is fleeing the area and asks her to follow him. He is in despair over his daughter's behavior (Lina pensai che un angelo in te mi desse il cielo – "Lina, I thought that in you heaven gave me an angel"). For a moment, he resolves to kill himself and begins to write a letter to Stiffelio. But Jorg enters to give him the news that he has tracked down Raffaele, who will be returning to the castle. Stankar rejoices (O gioia inesprimibile, che questo core inondi! – "Oh, the inexpressible joy that floods this heart of mine!"), as he sees revenge being within reach. He leaves.

Stiffelio confronts Raffaele and asks him what he would do if Lina were free, offering him a choice between "a guilty freedom" and "the future of the woman you have ruined". Raffaele does not respond, and the minister tells him to listen to his encounter with Lina from the other room.

Once Lina arrives, Stiffelio tells her that they must separate—he says he will leave and continue his ministry and suggests to Lina that she marry Raffaele in order to redeem her honor—and presents her with divorce papers (Opposto è il calle che in avvenire – "Opposite are the paths that our lives will follow in the future"). Lina, shocked, initially indignantly refuses ("I will die for your love"), but when Stiffelio accuses her of trying to emotionally manipulate him, she signs the papers in an attempt to prove her sincerity: as her husband, he could refuse to listen to her, but as a minister with nothing else between them, he cannot, and she wants nothing more than to have him hear the full truth. Thus appealing to Stiffelio more as a minister than as a husband, Lina confesses that she has always loved him and she still does. When Stiffelio asks her what happened with Raffaele, she tells him that Raffaele betrayed her. Stankar enters to announce that he has killed Raffaele. Jorg tries to convince Stiffelio to come to the church service (Ah sì, voliamo al tempio – "Ah, yes, let us flee to the church").

Scene 2: A church

The congregation gathers for services, singing the same hymn of forgiveness that they sang at the end of Act II. Meanwhile, Lina and Stankar pray for forgiveness for their respective sins of adultery and murder. Jorg tells Stiffelio, who is not convinced that he has the emotional fortitude or focus of mind to deliver a sermon after the events of the last 24 hours, to open the Bible to a random page and let God inspire him. Stiffelio mounts the pulpit and opens the Bible to the story of the adulterous woman (John 7:53–8:11). After reading the passage with which Jesus forgives the adulterous woman, Stiffelio in his turn forgives Lina ("Perdonata, perdonata, perdonata! Iddio lo pronunziò!"—"Forgiven, forgiven, forgiven! God has pronounced it!").

== Instrumentation ==
Stiffelio is scored for the following instruments:

- 1 flute (doubling on piccolo),
- 2 oboes (one doubling on English horn),
- 2 clarinets,
- 2 bassoons,
- 4 horns,
- 2 trumpets,
- 3 trombones,
- cimbasso,
- timpani,
- snare drum,
- bass drum,
- cymbals,
- organ,
- strings (violin I and II, viola, cello, double bass)

== Music ==
Reviews following the premiere were rather mixed, although Budden seems to suggest that there were more unfavorable ones than the reverse. However, one contemporary critic, writing in the Gazzetta Musicale states:

This is a work at once religious and philosophical, in which sweet and tender melodies follow one another in the most attractive manner, and which achieves...the most moving dramatic effects without having recourse to bands on the stage, choruses or superhuman demands on vocal cords or lungs.

When addressing the music of this opera, several writers refer to its unusual features and the ways by which it suggests directions in which the composer is moving and as seen in later operas. For example, when comparing both versions, Osborne states that act 1, scene 2 of Stiffelio "is almost Otello-like in its force and intensity, while Kimball states directly that "Verdi's music, in keeping with the dramatic theme, is as boldly unconventional as anything he had composed" and he continues, in referring to the Bible reading scene in the finale, that it:

marks the most radical break with the stylistic conventions of the day: its single lyrical phrase, the climactic 'Perdonata! Iddio lo pronunziò', stands out electricfyingly from an austere context of recitative intonation and quietly reiterated instrumental ostinati.

Osborne agrees when he describes the narrative and musical action moving in tandem in the last act:

Stiffelio preaches the gospel story of the woman taken in adultery, which he narrates in recitative. When he is suddenly moved to forgive Lina, his voice rises from the narrative chant to his top A on "Perdonata". The congregation echoes him, Lina ecstatically thanks God with her top C, and the curtain falls".

Gabriele Baldini's The Story of Giuseppe Verdi deals with Stiffelio and Aroldo together, so the former gets rather limited mention. But in regard to the music, he makes a point about how:

the act 1 soprano and baritone duet [O meco venite / "Come now with me; tears are of no consequence"] for example, contains the germ of several ideas which later expand the Rigoletto quartet. The dark instrumental introduction and broad, passionate arioso which opens act 2, finding the woman alone in an 'ancient cemetery', constitute a sort of dress rehearsal for the beginning of Un ballo in maschera's second act and the final scene of La forza del destino: it is no accident that, musically speaking, these are the best sections of both operas.

== Recordings ==
Year	Cast (Stiffelio, Lina, Stankar, Jorg)	Conductor, Opera House and Orchestra	Label
1968	Gastone Limarilli, Angeles Gulin, Walter Alberti, Beniamino Prior	Peter Maag, Teatro Regio di Parma orchestra and chorus	Audio CD: Melodram Milano; Cat: CDM 27033
1973	Mario del Monaco, Angeles Gulin, Giulio Fioravanti, Angelo Marchiandi	Oliviero di Fabritiis, ORF Teatro San Carlo Orchestra and Chorus	Audio CD: Opera d'Oro; ASIN : B002S4DN5K
1979	José Carreras, Sylvia Sass, Matteo Manuguerra, Wladimiro Ganzarolli	Lamberto Gardelli, ORF Symphony orchestra and chorus	Audio CD: Philips; Cat: 422 432-2
1993	José Carreras, Catherine Malfitano, Gregory Yurisich, Gwynne Howell	Edward Downes, Royal Opera House orchestra and chorus	DVD: Kultur; Cat: D1497
1993	Plácido Domingo, Sharon Sweet, Vladimir Chernov, Paul Plishka	James Levine, Metropolitan Opera orchestra and chorus	DVD: Deutsche Grammophon; Cat: 00440 073 4288
2001	Mario Malagnini, Dimitra Theodossiou, Marco Vratogna, Enzo Capuano	Nicola Luisotti, Orchestra and Chorus of Teatro Lirico Giuseppe Verdi, Trieste	Audio CD: Dynamic; Cat: CDS362
2012	Roberto Aronica, Yu Guanqun, Roberto Frontali, George Andguladze	Andrea Battistoni, Teatro Regio di Parma orchestra and chorus	DVD:C Major; Cat:723104
