= Borsi =

Borsi may refer to:

== People ==
- Maria Luigia Borsi, Italian opera singer
- Teresa De Giuli Borsi, born Maria Teresa Pippeo (1817–1877), Italian opera singer
- Veronica Borsi (1987), Italian hurdler

== Toponyms ==
- Borsh, a village in southern Albania
- Borsh Castle, a castle near the village Borsh, Albania
- Borsi, Greece, a village in the northern part of Elis, Greece
- Borsi, the Hungarian name for the village Borša, eastern Slovakia
- Borsi Colony, a quarter of the city of Durg, India
