= Oberto (opera) =

First opera of Giuseppe Verdi

Oberto Conte di San Bonifacio
- Opera by Giuseppe Verdi
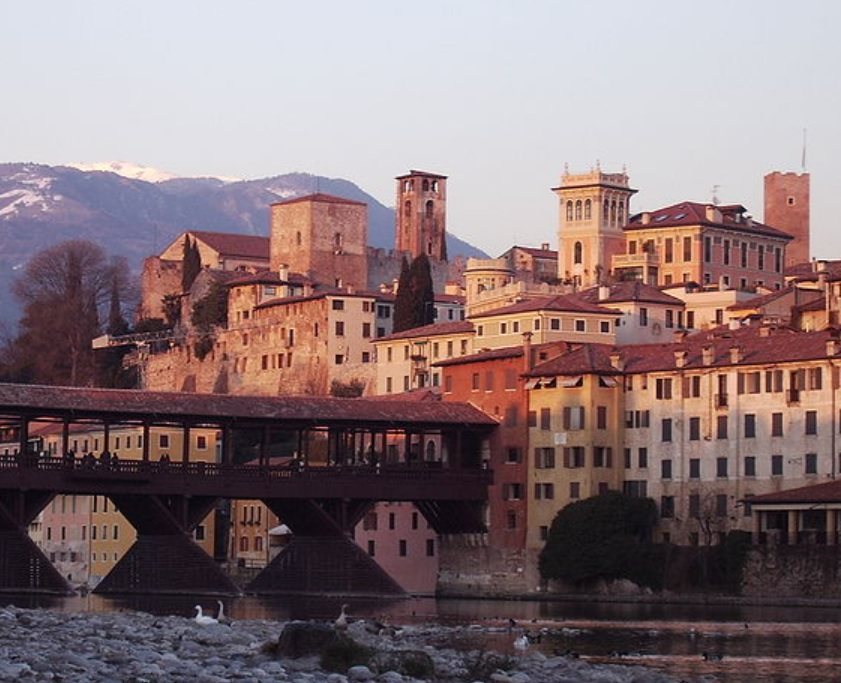
- The town and citadel of Bassano where the opera is set
- Librettist: Temistocle Solera
- Language: Italian
- Based on: libretto by Antonio Piazza
- Premiere: 17 November 1839; Teatro alla Scala, Milan

Oberto, Conte di San Bonifacio is an opera in two acts by Giuseppe Verdi to an Italian libretto by Temistocle Solera, based on an existing libretto by Antonio Piazza probably called Rocester.

It was Verdi's first opera, written over a period of four years, and was first performed at the Teatro alla Scala, Milan, on 17 November 1839. The La Scala production enjoyed "a fair success" and the theatre's impresario, Bartolomeo Merelli, commissioned two further operas from the young composer.

== Composition history ==
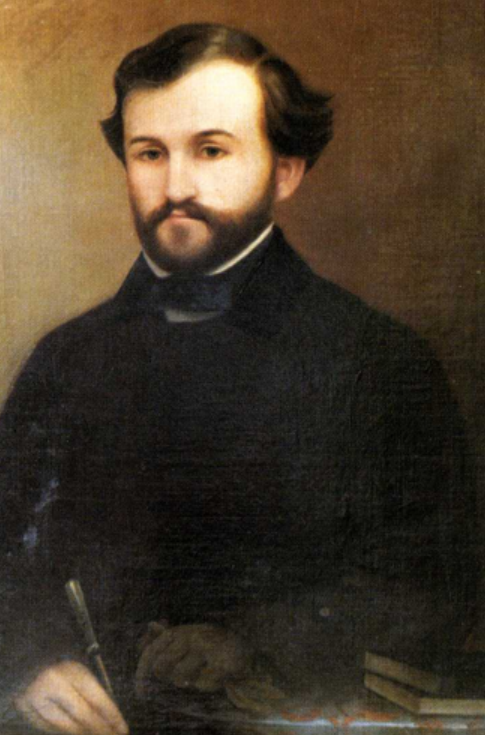
Portrait of Verdi, 1839–40 by Molentini

During his student days in Milan, Verdi began the process of making connections to the world of music in that city which were to stand him in good stead. These included an introduction by his teacher Lavigna to an amateur choral group, the Società Filarmonica, where he functioned as rehearsal director and continuo player for Haydn's The Creation in 1834, as well as conducting Rossini's La cenerentola himself the following year. 1836 saw his involvement in an April concert celebrating Emperor Ferdinand's birthday; for this he wrote a cantata in the Emperor's honour which received some praise.

But it was after his return to his hometown of Busseto in 1835 to become director of the music school with a three-year contract that Verdi took advantage of the connection he had made to the Filarmonica's director, Pietro Massini. In a series of letters from 1835 to 1837 he informed him about the progress towards writing his first opera using a libretto supplied by Massini which had been written by Antonio Piazza, a Milanese "journalist and man of letters". By then it had been given the title of Rocester and the young composer expressed hopes of a production in Parma.

However, Parma was not interested in new works and so approaches were made to Milan. Whether Rocester actually became the basis for Oberto when Verdi was able to return to Milan in February 1839 after fulfilling two and a half years of his contract in Busseto is subject to some disagreement amongst scholars. How much of Rochester remained visible in Oberto is discussed by Roger Parker, who does suggest that "in this shape-shifting tendency, the opera was, of course, very much of its time."

In his recollections in 1881 (quoted in Budden) following his return to Milan from Busseto in 1838, Verdi describes how he was invited to meet the La Scala impresario, Bartolomeo Merelli, who had heard a conversation about the music of the opera between soprano Giuseppina Strepponi and Giorgio Ronconi in which she praised it. Merelli then offered to put on Oberto during the 1839 season and, after its premiere, Oberto was given a respectable 13 additional performances.

== Performance history ==
=== 19th century ===
Bass Ignazio Marini was the first Oberto

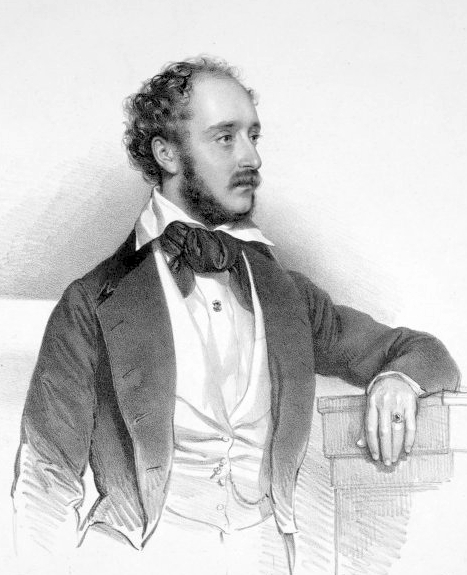
Lorenzo Salvi was the first Riccardo

As noted by Roger Parker, the opera, while having a somewhat limited success at La Scala, did receive revivals over the following three years, during which Verdi took the opportunity to compose new numbers or supply new or revised music to fit particular voices. It appeared in Turin and Milan in 1840, the latter in the autumn after the failure of Verdi's second opera, Un giorno di regno; again, it was seen in Naples and Genoa (both in 1841), and in Barcelona in 1842.

=== 20th century and beyond ===
The opera was staged in Parma on 6 September 1913, but it is only occasionally performed today. The British premiere did not take place until 8 April 1965, and then only in a concert version at St Pancras Town Hall. It was not given a staged production until 17 February 1982 at the Bloomsbury Theatre in London. Its American premiere did not take place until 18 February 1978 at the Amato Theatre in New York City, although the San Diego Opera gave the US professional premiere in March 1985 with Ferruccio Furlanetto and Susanne Marsee in the major roles. It is also claimed that Vincent La Selva (of the New York Grand Opera) gave the first New York presentation of the opera as part of the company's comprehensive and chronological "Viva Verdi" series which began in 1994 and which launched performances of all Verdi's operas. Opera North presented the opera during their 1994–5 season with John Tomlinson both directing and performing the title-role. The Royal Opera House, Covent Garden, gave a concert performance in June 1997 with Denyce Graves as Cuniza.

Three opera companies, which plan to present all of Verdi's operas, have given this opera recently. Companies which intend to present all of the composer's works have included Oberto in their schedules in recent years. These are Sarasota Opera which staged it in 2001 as part of their "Verdi Cycle"; the ABAO in Bilbao, Spain, gave performances in January 2007, as part of their "Tutto Verdi" series; and the Teatro Regio di Parma gave it in October 2007 as part of their on-going "Festival Verdi". In 2010 the Berliner Operngruppe under Felix Krieger presented the work in a concert performance in Berlin.

In celebration of the Verdi bicentennial, it was staged by La Scala in April/May 2013.

== Roles ==
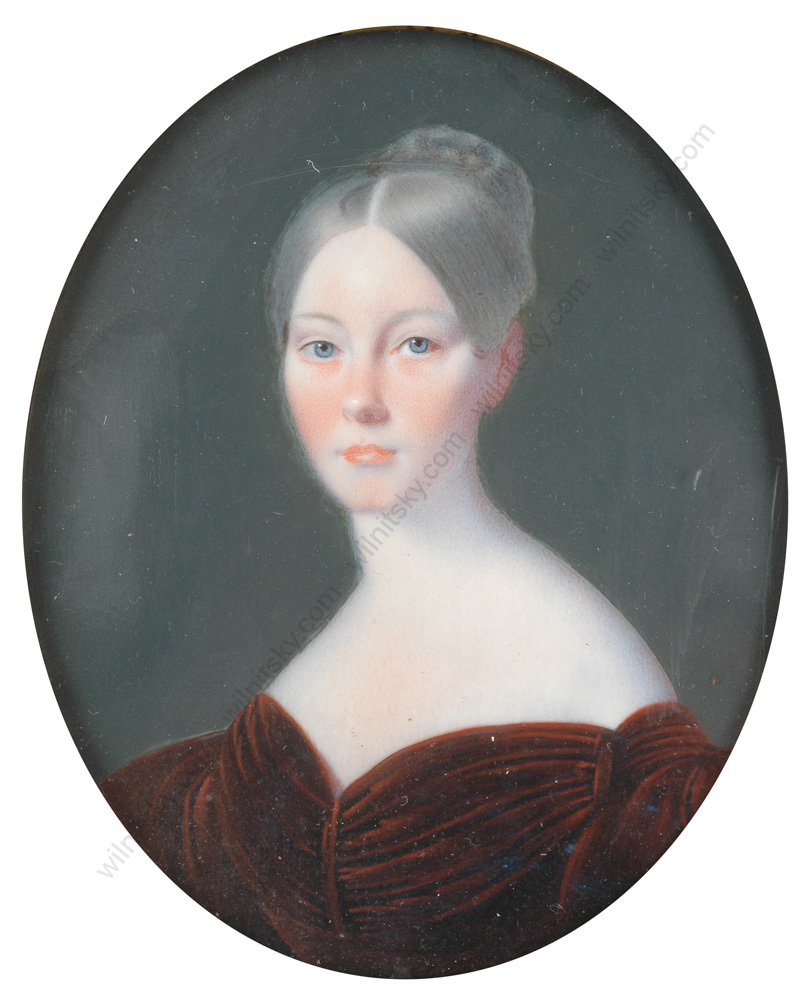
Mary Shaw Postans sang the first Cuniza

Role	Voice type	Premiere Cast, 17 November 1839 (Conductor: Eugenio Cavallini)
Oberto, Count of San Bonifacio	bass	Ignazio Marini
Leonora, his daughter	soprano	Antonietta Marini-Rainieri
Cuniza, sister of Ezzelino da Romano	mezzo-soprano	Mary Shaw
Imelda, Cuniza's confidant	mezzo-soprano	Marietta Sacchi
Riccardo, Count of Salinguerra	tenor	Lorenzo Salvi
Lords, ladies, vassals

== Synopsis ==
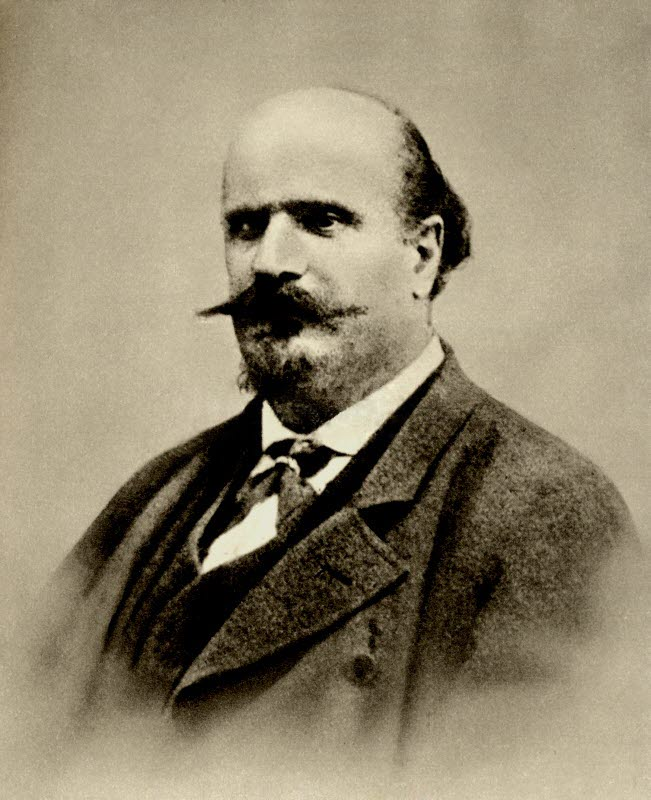
Temistocle Solera, the librettist of the opera

Time: 1228
Place: Northern Italy, Bassano, at Ezzelino da Romano's castle and nearby

Before the action takes place, a battle has been fought between Oberto, Count of San Boniface, and the Salinguerra, led by Ezzelino da Romano. Oberto has lost and has retreated to Mantua. Meanwhile, his daughter Leonora has been seduced and abandoned by Riccardo, Count of Salinguerra, and Riccardo is about to marry Cuniza, Ezzelino's sister. Leonora makes her way to Bassano on Riccardo's wedding day, intent on confronting him.

=== Act 1 ===
Scene 1: The countryside near Bassano

Riccardo is welcomed by a chorus as he is about to enter Ezzelino's palace. He sings of his joy at being close to Cuniza (Son fra voi! Già sorto è il giorno...Già parmi udire il fremito – "Here I am amongst you! The day hasted by my desire has now arrived"). They enter the castle. Leonora arrives swearing to avenge Riccardo's desertion and she sings of the love which she had and a hope of recovering those innocent days (Sotto il paterno tetto...Oh potessi nel mio core- "Beneath my father's roof an angel appeared to me"). She leaves to go towards the village. Her father, Oberto, arrives, pleased to be back in his home country but unsure of Leonora's whereabouts. When Leonora returns, each is aware of the other's presence and father and daughter are reunited. They express amazement at having found each other again. But Oberto's initial anger at Leonora's actions quickly turns to fatherly affection as the pair makes plans to disrupt the wedding.

Scene 2: A room in Ezzelino's palace

The chorus sings a welcome to the happy bride but, alone with Riccardo, Cuniza expresses some forebodings in spite of expressing her love for him. (Questa gioia che il petto m'inonda – "This joy that overwhelms my breast is mingled with a mysterious fear").

After the couple leaves, Leonora enters and is questioned by Imelda. Leonora tells her that her father, Oberto, is also in the palace and, when he enters, she tells Cuniza about her betrayal by Riccardo. Cuniza agrees to help them.

She then hides Oberto in a nearby room and invites Riccardo and his guests to join her. Upon entering, Cuniza reveals Leonora's presence and accuses her lover of infidelity. Riccardo's accusations against Leonora prompt her father to enter and challenge Riccardo to a duel.

=== Act 2 ===
Scene 1: The princess's private apartments

Cuniza and Imelda are alone and the servant announces that Riccardo wishes to speak to her mistress. Cuniza laments the love she had, but following her aria, Oh, chi torna l'ardente pensiero – "Oh, who can turn my fevered thoughts", she instructs Imelda to tell Riccardo that he should return to Leonora, concluding in Più che i vezzi e lo splendore – "More persuasive to my conscience" that she has made the right decision.

Scene 2: A remote place near the castle gardens

The courtiers gather and express their sympathy for Leonora's plight. As they leave, Oberto enters, waiting for his rival to appear. He proclaims that he will seek vengeance: (Aria: L'orror del tradimento – "The horror of his betrayal"). The courtiers return to tell him that Cuniza has interceded on his behalf and that he has nothing to fear from Riccardo, but Oberto's thoughts still focus on vengeance. Riccardo finally arrives and they begin to fight, but are soon stopped by Cuniza who arrives with Leonora. Cuniza insists that Riccardo admit his infidelity and agrees to marry Leonora. Still determined to fight his rival, Oberto extracts an agreement from Riccardo that they will soon meet in the woods. Oberto leaves the group to go into the woods; all leave. Offstage, the sound of a duel in progress can be heard and it is followed by Riccardo's arrival. He realizes that he has killed Oberto (Aria: Ciel che feci? – "Heavens, what have I done!") and he is filled with remorse. Then Imelda and Cuniza appear explaining that Leonora is prostrate over the dead body of her father. Soon a letter arrives from Riccardo explaining that he has gone into exile leaving everything he possesses to Leonora. In her grief, she announces that she will become a hermit.

== Critical reactions ==
Contemporary critical reactions to Verdi's first effort were mixed, as noted by scholar Francis Toye, writing in 1931, when he quoted two Milanese critics:

"The music of this opera," wrote the paper La Fama, "has much in common with the style of Bellini. There is an abundant, perhaps a too abundant wealth of melody. In some passages where the words demand energy and passion the vocal line is languid and monotonous." The paper then goes on to praise two arias and a quartet in the second act, a judgment shared by the periodical Figaro which, incidentally, advised the composer to make a further study of the classics. As a matter of fact, the quartet in question may be described as an afterthought, Merelli himself having suggested it when Verdi was making certain alterations in the opera to meet the requirements of the new cast.

Julian Budden comments on the performance reviews of the time, especially one which indicates that Verdi's music was not inspired by Donizetti, Bellini, Mercadante nor Rossini, and he states "in detail it owes a little to all of them. But what finally emerges is often subtly different, with a flavour of its own. Above all, it has that ultra-Verdian quality of gathering momentum as it proceeds."

== Music ==
Given the need at the time for composers to take into account singers' strengths and weaknesses, Verdi's writing for the four principals (rather than the more conventional three of that era) who became the cast for the premiere of Oberto well accommodated the limitations of Mary Shaw's voice and played to the strengths of Antonietta Rainieri-Marini's in the lower register. Ignazio Marini, the bass who sang the title role, was "a performer of impressive vocal and dramatic range, for whom Verdi would later write the title role of Attila, notes Parker. He continues by adding that "la Marini" was undoubtedly grateful to Verdi in that it was she who quite probably helped to secure most of the revivals of the opera during the following few years where she appeared as Leonora in four of the five of them.

Agreeing with Parker that the support given to "la Marini" helped with stagings of further performances from 1840 to 1843 (and, therefore, allowed the composer the opportunity to make additions and changes as these performances were played in different cities and with different singers).

For the 1840 revival after the failure of Un giorno di regno, the role of Cuniza was sung by Luigia Abbadia and it was for her that Verdi wrote an entrance aria in act 1 and a duet for Cuniza and Riccardo also in act 1, the latter described as being "full of that intensely condensed melodic expressiveness that will characterise the best of his early music. It is on quite a different level of invention from the rest of Oberto.

Toye notes that, in spite of its weaknesses, the opera:

still compels attention. For instance, the energy of the finale of the first act, at times surprisingly classical in feeling, is remarkable; and the same is true to an even greater extent of the quartet in the second act, certainly the best music in the opera and a fine piece of ensemble writing in which, towards the end, the curious will find an amusing reminiscence of Schubert['s] "Marche Militaire."

== Recordings ==
Year	Cast (Oberto, Leonora, Cuniza, Riccardo)	Conductor, Opera House and Orchestra	Label
1951	Giuseppe Modesti, Maria Vitale, Elena Nicolai, Gino Bonelli	Alfredo Simonetto, Orchestra and Chorus of RAI Torino	Audio CD: Gala
1977	Simon Estes, Viorica Cortez, Angeles Gulin, Umberto Grilli	Zoltan Pesko, Orchestra e Coro del Teatro Comunale di Bologna	Audio CD: Italia Fonicetra
1983	Rolando Panerai, Ghena Dimitrova, Ruža Pospiš-Baldani, Carlo Bergonzi	Lamberto Gardelli, Bavarian Radio Symphony Orchestra, Chorus of Bavarian Radio	Audio CD: Orfeo; Cat: C 105842
1997	Samuel Ramey, Maria Guleghina, Violeta Urmana, Stuart Neill	Sir Neville Marriner, Academy of St. Martin in the Fields; London Voices	Audio CD: Philips Classics; Cat: 454 472–2
2007	Ildar Abdrazakov, Evelyn Herlitzius, Marianne Cornetti, Carlo Ventre	Yves Abel, Orquestra Sinfonica del Principado de Asturias, Chorus of Opéra de Bilbao	DVD: Opus Arte; Cat: OA 0982 D
2007	Giovanni Battista Parodi, Francesca Sassu, Mariana Pentcheva, Fabio Sartori	Antonello Allemandi, Teatro Regio di Parma (Recording of a performance at the Teatro Regio, 2007)	DVD:C Major; Cat:720104
2012	Adrian Ganz, Franceska Lombardi, Manuela Custer, Norman Reinhardt	Michael Hofstetter, Theater Gießen	Audio CD: Oehms Classics Cat: OC959

== See also ==
The historical Cunizza da Romano, whose life was as at least as interesting as this fictionalised account.
