= Marietta Gazzaniga =

Italian opera singer (1824–1884)

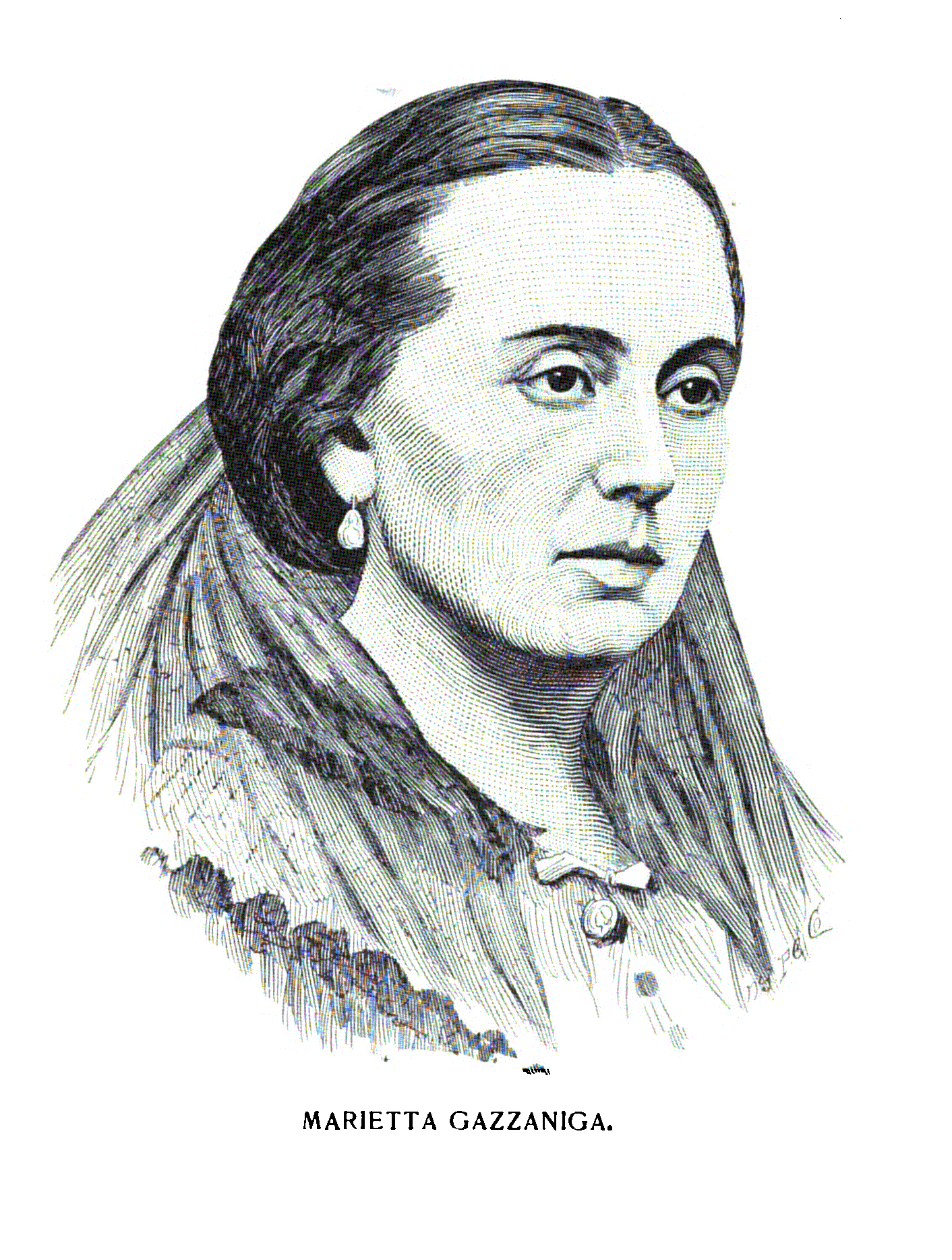
Marietta Gazzaniga

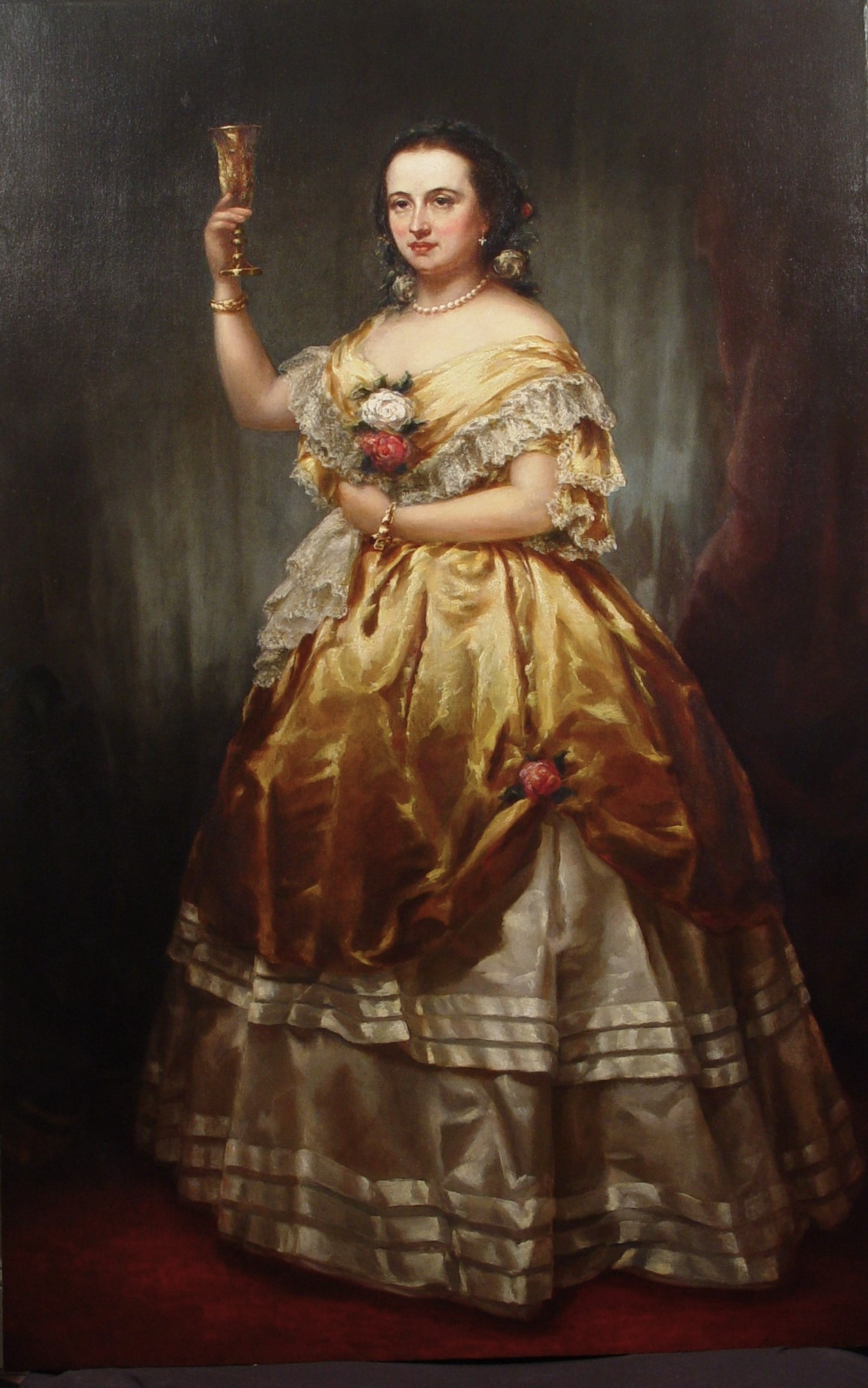
Marietta Gazzaniga as Violetta in La Traviata by Joseph Alexander Ames circa 1858. Donated to the Academy of Music in Philadelphia, PA by Mrs. Sarah Harrison in 1877.

Marietta Gazzaniga (1824 – 2 January 1884) was an Italian operatic lyric - dramatic soprano.

Gazzaniga was born in Voghera and studied singing with Alberto Mazzucato in Milan. Her debut season was in 1840 in Voghera where she sang Jane Seymour in Donizetti's Anna Bolena and Romeo in Bellini's I Capuleti e i Montecchi.

She sang the title role in the premiere of Verdi's Luisa Miller at the Teatro di San Carlo in Naples in 1849, and a year later she sang Lina in the premiere of Verdi's Stiffelio in Trieste. Starting in 1851 she began singing at La Scala. In 1852 she sang Gilda in Verdi's Rigoletto in Bergamo. The production was deemed a failure, with Gazzaniga's performance being blamed. At the time, Verdi, who was quite irritated, claimed that he had also disliked her performances in the premieres of Luisa Miller and Stiffelio. That same year she also performed in Bologna, singing the title role in Bellini's Norma and Paolina in Donizetti's Poliuto.

Later she went on tour to both North and Central America. On her first such tour, which began in 1857, her husband, Count Malaspina, died of smallpox on the boat to Havana. On February 25, 1857, Marietta performed in Philadelphia as Lenora in Il Trovatore, in the first operatic performance at the then new, Academy of Music. [3] On a subsequent tour to New York (1866–1867) a critic praised her voice as having "greater purity and less vehement forcing of tone". She continued touring each year in the Americas until 1870. Near the end of her career she sang mezzo-soprano roles. For example, she relinquished the role of Leonora in Verdi's Il trovatore and sang Azucena instead.

She died in Milan.
