= Filippo Colini =

Italian opera singer (1811–1863)

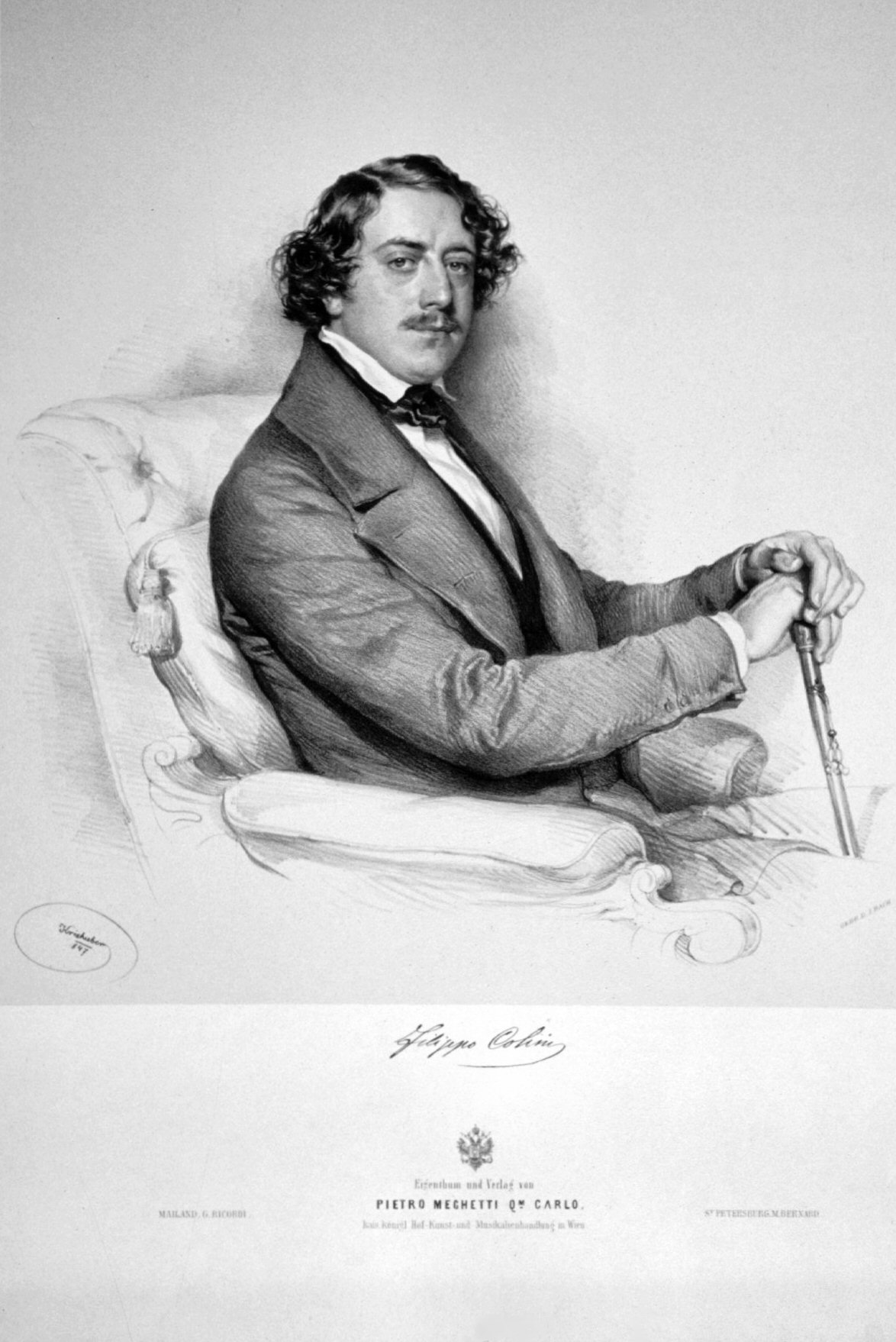
Filippo Colini Lithograph by Josef Kriehuber, 1847

Filippo Colini (21 October 1811 – June 1863) was an Italian operatic baritone. Debuted with the Accademia Filarmonica Romana in 1831. He is best known today for creating roles in the world premieres of several operas by Giuseppe Verdi, including Giacomo in Giovanna d'Arco (1845), Rolando in La battaglia di Legnano (1849), and Stankar in Stiffelio (1850).

Colini was born in Rome. Other roles that he originated during his career include Appio Claudio in Alessandro Nini's Virginia (1843), Luigi XIV in Fabio Campana's Luisa di Francia (1844), Severo in Gaetano Donizetti's Poliuto (1848), Prospero in Fromental Halévy's La tempesta (1850), and Inquaro in Eugenio Terziani's Alfredo (1852).
