= Sven Hansell =

American musicologist (1934–2014)

- Born: Sven Hostrup Hansell; 23 October 1934; New York City
- Died: 6 March 2014 (aged 79); Roseville, California
- Education: University of Pennsylvania (BA) University of Illinois (PhD)
- Occupation: Musicologist

Sven Hostrup Hansell (23 October 1934 – 6 March 2014) was an American musicologist and Professor Emeritus of Musicology at the University of Iowa. He was a specialist in the music and performance practices of the 17th and 18th centuries, as well as a harpsichordist and composer.

== Life and career ==
Hansell was born in New York City and grew up in Philadelphia. He received his bachelor's degree from the University of Pennsylvania in 1956 and a Master's Degree from Harvard University in 1958. He then studied composition with Nadia Boulanger in France as well as undertaking further studies at the University of Copenhagen, the Musikhochschule in Berlin, and Indiana University. He received his PhD from the University of Illinois in 1966 with a dissertation on the cantatas, motets, and antiphons of Johann Adolf Hasse.

Hansell taught music history and harpsichord at University of California, Davis before joining the faculty of the University of Iowa in 1973. He retired from the University of Iowa in 1999 as Professor Emeritus of Musicology. In the course of his career, he contributed over sixty articles to the New Grove Dictionary of Music and Musicians, including the article on Hasse.

At the time of his death Hansell was married to the German musicologist Marie-Agnes Dittrich. He was formerly married to the musicologist and organist Kathleen Kuzmick Hansell.
