= Marc Piollet =

French conductor (born 1962)

- Born: 1962 (age 62–63); Paris, France
- Education: Berlin University of the Arts
- Occupations: Conductor; Academic teacher
- Organizations: Staatstheater Kassel; Hessisches Staatstheater Wiesbaden; University of Music and Performing Arts Graz

Marc Piollet (born 1962) is a French conductor. After positions at the Staatstheater Kassel and Volksoper in Vienna, he was Generalmusikdirektor (GMD) at the Hessisches Staatstheater Wiesbaden from 2004 to 2012.

== Career ==
Born in Paris, Piollet studied at the Berlin University of the Arts, conducting with Hans-Martin Rabenstein and choral conducting with Christian Grube. He attended master classes with John Eliot Gardiner, Michael Gielen, Kurt Masur and Lothar Zagrosek.

After his studies he was employed as First Kapellmeister at the Philharmonic State Orchestra Halle and at the Staatstheater Kassel, where he was also deputy music director. Subsequently he received an engagement at the Vienna Volksoper from 2003 to 2005. From 2004, Piollet was Generalmusikdirektor at the Hessisches Staatstheater Wiesbaden, where he conducted Wagner's complete Der Ring des Nibelungen. He also conducted new productions of Mozart's Idomeneo and Don Giovanni, Weber's Der Freischütz, Rossini's Il barbiere di Siviglia, Verdi's Rigoletto, Simon Boccanegra, Don Carlos and Falstaff, Wagner's Lohengrin and Tristan und Isolde, and Puccini's La Bohème and Tosca. Piollet also conducted numerous symphony concerts with the Hessisches Staatsorchester.

Guest engagements led the conductor to the Hamburg State Opera, the Staatstheater Stuttgart, the Cologne Opera, the Deutsche Oper Berlin, the Vienna State Opera, and music stages of Paris, Tokyo, Copenhagen, Barcelona, among others. Piollet has conducted leading orchestras including the Munich Philharmonic, the Leipzig Gewandhaus Orchestra, the Bamberg Symphony Orchestra, the Munich Radio Orchestra, the Brandenburger Symphoniker and the Dresden Philharmonic.

Since October 2016 Piollet has been professor of orchestral conducting at the University of Music and Performing Arts Graz.

== Recordings ==
In 2001, Piollet conducted recordings of rarely played romantic symphonies with the orchestra of the Staatstheater Kassel, Norbert Burgmüller's Symphony No. 1 in C minor and Hugo Staehle's Symphony No. 1 in C minor, for the label Sterling.

Piollet conducted a production of Bizet's Carmen at the Liceu in Barcelona in 2010, staged by Calixto Bieito, with Béatrice Uria-Monzon in the title role, which was recorded on DVD.
