= Berliner Operngruppe =

The Berliner Operngruppe is a German opera society with its own chorus and orchestra, based in Berlin, with the mission to revive rarely played Italian operas in Berlin. Since 2013 the semi-staged performances take place in Konzerthaus Berlin am Gendarmenmarkt.

Since 2010 the Berliner Operngruppe has performed Giuseppe Verdi's Oberto, Conte di San Bonifacio (2010), Gaetano Donizetti's Maria di Rohan (2011), Giuseppe Verdi's Attila (2012), Vincenzo Bellini's Beatrice di Tenda (2013), Giuseppe Verdi's I Masnadieri (2014), Gaetano Donizetti's Betly (2015), Giuseppe Verdi's Stiffelio (2017), Giuseppe Verdi's Giovanna d'Arco (2018), Giacomo Puccini's Edgar (2019) and Pietro Mascagni's Iris. The debut album of the Berliner Operngruppe, a live recording of Iris was released by Oehms Classics on 19 March 2021.

On 1 September 2021, they produced Donizetti's Deux hommes et une femme, also known as Rita, in the first performance in Germany of the new critical edition of the opera's French version.

Founder, artistic director and principal conductor is the German conductor Felix Krieger. The Berliner Operngruppe was awarded as "Ausgewählter Ort 2012" by the German National competition "365 Orte im Land der Ideen".
