= Eugène Bourgeois =

French dramatist and writer

- Born: 12 March 1818
- Died: 28 August 1847

Claude Eugène Hippolyte Bourgeois (French pronunciation: [klod øʒɛn ipɔlit buʁʒwa]; March 12, 1818 - August 28, 1847) was a French dramatist and writer.

Bourgeois was born in Morlaix. He is remembered today for collaborating with Émile Souvestre on the play Le Pasteur ou l'Évangile et le foyer, which was adapted by Francesco Maria Piave into the libretto for Giuseppe Verdi's Stiffelio. He collaborated with Souvestre on two other works as well, and also wrote a few works on his own. He died, aged 29, at Penzé-en-Taulé.
