= Kathleen Kuzmick Hansell =

American musicologist and organist

- Born: Kathleen Amy Kuzmick; 21 September 1941 (age 84); Bridgeport, Connecticut
- Education: Wellesley College (BA); University of Illinois (MM); University of California, Berkeley (PhD)
- Occupation: Musicologist
- Spouse: Sven Hansell

Kathleen Kuzmick Hansell, née Kuzmick, (born 21 September 1941) is an American musicologist and organist. Amongst her publications are pioneering research on the role of dance in 18th century opera and critical editions of opera scores by Mozart, Rossini, and Verdi.

== Life and career ==
Hansell was born in Bridgeport, Connecticut and studied as an undergraduate at Wellesley College, receiving her BA in 1963. She then studied at the University of Illinois where she received her master's degree in music in 1969 and at the University of California, Berkeley, where she received her PhD in 1980. Her doctoral dissertation was entitled Opera and ballet at the Regio Ducal Teatro of Milan, 1771–1776: a musical and social history. She worked as an organist and teacher in Illinois from 1967 and at Grinnell College in Iowa from 1976. From 1982 she was an archivist at the Swedish Music History Archive in Stockholm and in 1987 edited Volume 14 of the complete works of Swedish composer Franz Berwald for the Monumenta musicae Svecicae series. She later worked for many years as the acquiring editor for music at University of Chicago Press and was the managing editor of the publisher's Works of Giuseppe Verdi series.

Hansell was formerly married to the American musicologist Sven Hansell.

== Bibliography ==
Hansell's publications include the following:

=== Scores ===
- Wolfgang Amadeus Mozart: Lucio Silla, critical edition of the score (Kathleen Kuzmick Hansell, ed.). Internationale Stiftung Mozarteum/Bärenreiter, 1986
- Giuseppe Verdi: Stiffelio, critical edition of the score (Kathleen Kuzmick Hansell, ed.). University of Chicago Press, 2003
- Gioachino Rossini: Zelmira, critical edition of the score (Helen Greenwald and Kathleen Kuzmick Hansell, eds.). Fondazione Rossini/Ricordi 2005

=== Articles ===
- "Ballet in Stockholm during the later 18th century and its relationship to contemporary trends on the Continent" (1984). Svensk tidskrift för Musikforskning, Vol. 66.
- "Compositional Techniques in Verdi's Stiffelio: Reading the Autograph Sources" (1997) in Martin Chusid (ed.). Verdi's Middle Period: Source Studies, Analysis, and Performance Practice. University of Chicago Press
- "Ballet in Italy: The Background to Verdi" (2001) in Alison Latham and Roger Parker (eds.). Verdi in Performance. Oxford University Press
- "Theatrical Ballet and Italian Opera" (2002) in Lorenzo Bianconi and Giorgio Pestelli (eds.). Opera on Stage. University of Chicago Press
- "Eighteenth-Century Italian Theatrical Ballet" (2005) in Rebecca Harris-Warwick and Bruce Alan Brown (eds.). The Grotesque Dancer on the Eighteenth~Century Stage: Gennaro Magri and His World. University of Wisconsin Press.
