= La battaglia di Legnano =

Italian opera

- Opera by Giuseppe Verdi
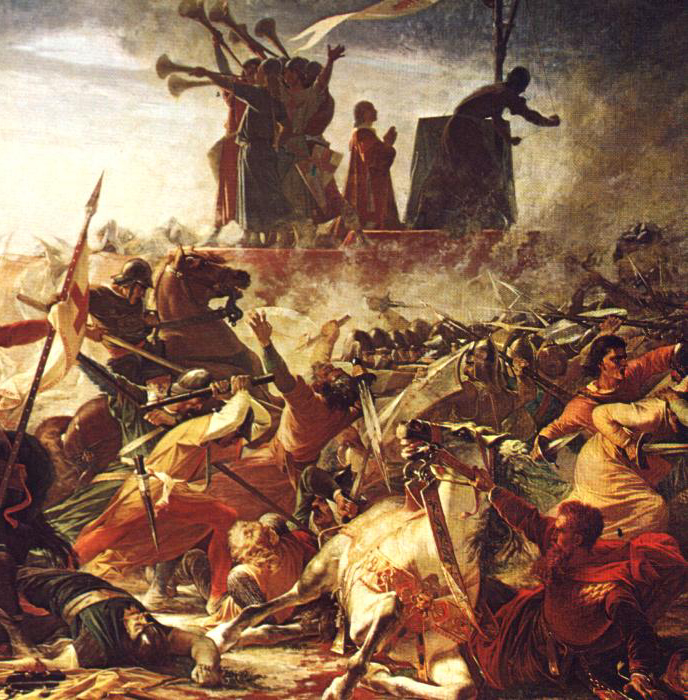
- Battaglia di Legnano (Battle of Legnano) (detail)
- Librettist: Salvadore Cammarano
- Language: Italian
- Based on: La Bataille de Toulouse (1828) by Joseph Méry
- Premiere: 27 January 1849; Teatro Argentina, Rome

La battaglia di Legnano (The Battle of Legnano) is an opera in four acts, with music by Giuseppe Verdi to an Italian-language libretto by Salvadore Cammarano. It was based on the play La Bataille de Toulouse by Joseph Méry, later the co-librettist of Don Carlos.

Written as a commission from the Teatro Argentina in the "beleaguered republic" of Rome while the composer was still living in Paris, he traveled to Rome in late 1848 to prepare the opera for its first performance, which was given on 27 January 1849. Musicologist Roger Parker describes the première as "a clamorous success, with the entire final act encored" and the audience wild with enthusiasm. He goes to add that act 4 was encored at every performance of the run. However, the opera failed in its 1850 production in Genoa.

In later years Battaglia was given under different settings and different titles until Italian unification allowed for the opera to be presented as originally written. Verdi considered revising it in the 1850s, but never did.

== Composition history ==
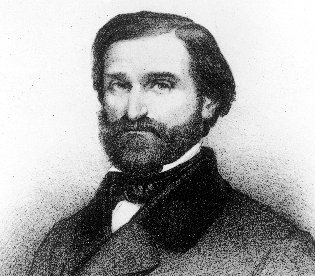
Verdi around 1850

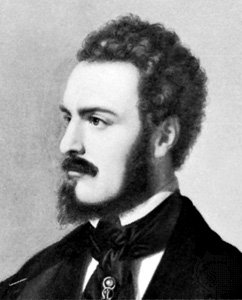
Poet Giuseppe Giusti, (detail) by Ferdinando Rondoni

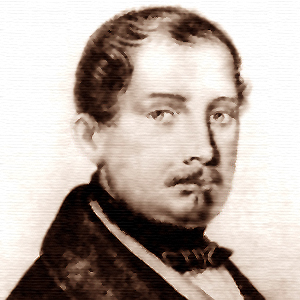
Librettist Salvadore Cammarano

Verdi's 14th opera was written while he was living in Paris in 1848 (though he quickly traveled to Milan after receiving news of the March "Cinque Giornate" – the five days of street fighting which drove the Austrians out of the city) and it seems to have been composed specifically as "an opera with a purpose" (as opera historian Charles Osborne describes it). Osborne continues: "while parts of Verdi's earlier operas had frequently been taken up by the fighters of the Risorgimento [...] this time the composer had given the movement its own opera".

While still writing I masnadieri and with his obligation to complete an opera for the publisher, Francesco Lucca, Verdi had been admonished by the poet Giuseppe Giusti for turning away from patriotic subjects when he composed Macbeth; the poet pleaded with him to "do what you can to nourish the [sorrow of the Italian people], to strengthen it, and direct it to its goal." Verdi replied encouragingly. With his other obligations out of the way, he was hesitant in committing to anything that was not a genuinely patriotic subject, but he despaired that librettists were incapable to providing them until Salvadore Cammarano (who supplied the libretto for the 1845 Alzira) came up with the idea of adapting Joseph Méry's 1828 play La Bataille de Toulouse, a well-known and well-liked play in Italy at that time. "A story like that should stir every man with an Italian soul in his breast" was how the librettist described it.

"Conceived in the springtime of Italian hopes" (as Budden describes the initial enthusiasm for the work), by the time Cammarano produced a final libretto it was early 1849 and it was also clear that the Austrians had not been permanently routed from Lombardy. The premiere was set for late January 1849, some last-minute adjustments were made, and Verdi traveled to Rome before the end of 1848. At this point in the rise of Italian nationalism, Rome under Pope Pius IX was in turmoil and the Pope was held prisoner (without his Swiss guards), but he managed to escape to the south, hoping to negotiate his return. Within days of Battaglia's totally sold-out premiere, Rome had become a republic, accelerated by the passions inflamed amongst its inhabitants by (amongst other things) the opera's final chorus of freedom: "Italia risorge vestita di Gloria, invitta e regina qual'era sarà" / "Italy rises again robed in glory!, Unconquered and a queen she shall be as once she was!".

== Performance history ==
19th century

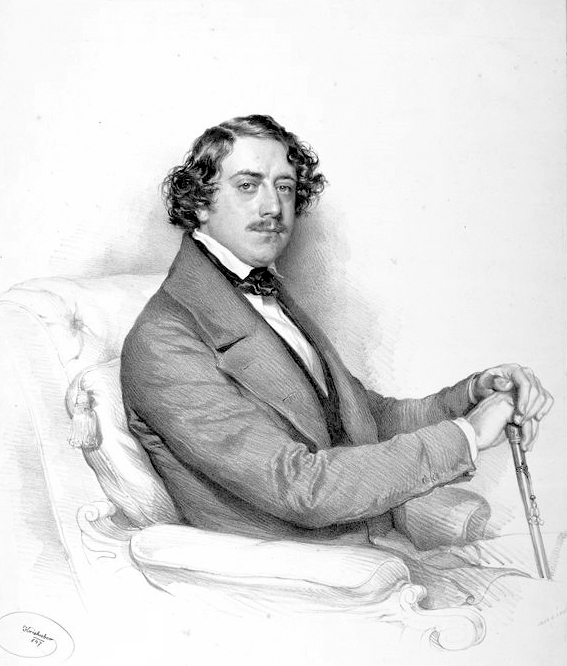
Baritone Filippo Colini, the first Rolando

Initial reactions at the premiere were ecstatic by all accounts (as noted above). Charles Osborne adds to some of the details of the premiere when he describes the house as "packed to the rafters" and continues by stating that "Verdi's music roused the entire house to a frenzy of enthusiasm" with cries of "Viva Verdi!" and "Viva Italia" coming from the audience when the words of the opening chorus – Viva Italia! Sacro un patto / Tutti stringe I figli suoi / "Long live Italy!. A sacred pact binds all her sons") – were heard.

But, as writer John Black notes in his study of Cammarano, "For all its appeal to the spirit of the times – or perhaps because of it, as conditions of order were re-established – it was not widely revived during the ten years that followed" the premiere since, after initial performances around Italy, the opera fell foul of the Austrian censors, as much as anything caused by what musicologist Roger Parker describes as "perhaps its too intense association with a particular historical period" or, as Budden puts it, [it had] "the taint of a pièce d'occasion somewhat to the composer's mortification."

"Even before the premiere, Ricordi was in touch with Cammarano about an alternative version, with the action removed to the Flemish- Spanish wars, under the title, L'assedio di Arlem [with] Federico Barbarossa...to be replaced by the Duke of Alba, etc." However, the librettist did not want to get involved and renounced his rights to the libretto 3 February 1849, but the opera was re-structured and revived in Milan 12 years later as L'assedio di Haarlem (based on the historic 1572 to 1575 Siege of Haarlem).

In Parma, after the Italian victories of 1859, it was re-titled La disfatta degli Austriaci (The defeat of the Austrians). It was presented in Genoa, Corfu, Turin, and Piacenza between 1850 and 1859 and revived in Milan and Naples in 1861.

In the 1880s it was re-styled in French as Pour la Patrie for a projected production at the Théâtre Château-d'Eau in Paris which did not happen. However, as Emanuele Muzio reports by letter to Verdi, this adaptation was later successfully performed in the French provinces.

20th century and beyond

In Italy, the opera was seen in 1959 in Florence and Venice to commemorate the centenary of the Second Italian War of Independence, and in Trieste in 1963 (on each occasion starring Leyla Gencer). La Scala has mounted the piece twice in the last century: once in 1916 and once in 1961. The 1961 cast was recorded and includes performances by Franco Corelli, Antonietta Stella, and Ettore Bastianini.

The Rome Opera presented Battaglia in December 1983, a performance of which was recorded. In the 1990s, it was staged in Piacenza in January 1999 with Lida sung by Fiorenza Cedolins. Additionally, it was presented in the Teatro Massimo Bellini in Catania in December 2001 under Nello Santi. A video recording was made of the production.

Battaglia was not performed in the United Kingdom until 31 October 1960 when it was given its UK première by the Welsh Opera Company in London at Sadler's Wells. The Royal Opera House company (during the period when the house was closed) gave a concert performance at the Royal Festival Hall in July 2000 with a cast which included Plácido Domingo (as Arrigo) and Anthony Michaels-Moore singing Rolando. Verónica Villarroel sang Lida.

It was only on 28 February 1976 that this opera was given its US premiere by the Amato Opera in New York City. Two concert performances have been presented by the Opera Orchestra of New York; the first was in January 1987 with Matteo Manuguerra, Aprile Millo and Jerome Hines while the second was given on 19 November 2001. The Pittsburgh Opera presented the work with June Anderson on 20 September 1985.

In Rome in 2011, as part of the 150th anniversary of Italian Unification, Battaglia was presented by the Rome Opera.

Companies which plan to present all of Verdi's operas include the ABAO in Bilbao which presented it in 2007, and it was given by Sarasota Opera as part of its "Verdi Cycle" in 2016. As the Verdi bicentennial year was approaching, it was staged by the Teatro Regio di Parma in October 2012 (as part of its "Festival Verdi" series) and was directed by David Alden. The Parma production was repeated in Trieste. Hamburg State Opera presented performances in October/November 2013 along with two other early Verdi operas, all directed by Alden.

== Roles ==
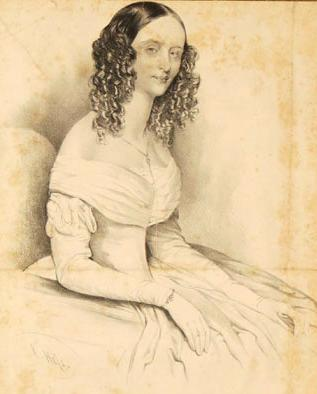
Soprano Teresa De Giuli Borsi (c. 1845), the first Lida

Role	Voice type	Première Cast, 27 January 1849 (Leader: Emilio Angelini, Verdi at the cembalo)
Federico Barbarossa, German emperor	bass	Pietro Sottovia
First Consul of Milan	bass	Alessandro Lanzoni
Second Consul of Milan	bass	Achille Testi
Mayor of Como	bass	Filippo Giannini
Rolando, Milanese leader	baritone	Filippo Colini
Lida, his wife	soprano	Teresa De Giuli Borsi
Arrigo, Veronese Warrior	tenor	Gaetano Fraschini
Marcovaldo, German prisoner	baritone	Lodovico Butia
Imelda, Lida's servant	mezzo-soprano	Vincenza Marchesi
Arrigo's squire	tenor	Mariano Conti
A herald	tenor	Gaetano Ferri
Knights of Death, Magistrates and leaders of Como, Milanese people and Senators, Warriors of Verona, Brescia, Novara, Piacenza and Milan, and the German Army

== Synopsis ==
Time: 1176
Place: Milan and Como

=== Act 1 – "He Lives!" ===
Scene 1: Milan, not far from the city walls

Outside the city walls, people have gathered in support of the Lombard League whose troops are about to go into battle against the occupying German Emperor Federico Barbarossa. Among them is Arrigo, a young soldier whom all had thought dead, but he has now re-joined the army and he recounts how his mother had nursed his wounds (La pia materna mano / "A mother's kindly hand") after he was left for dead. Having recovered and before leaving again, he wants to see Lida, his sweetheart. Rolando, Arrigo's friend and leader of the troops from Milan, arrives and he is amazed to see Arrigo alive. Joyously, he embraces his friend (Ah m'abbraccia d'esultanza / "Ah! Come to my arms..."). The gathered troops and the consuls of Milan all swear to defend the city against tyranny.

Scene 2: Beside the ramparts of the city

Rolando's wife Lida, who has lost her parents and brothers and who is downcast at the prospect of further war, also mourns the loss of her former love, Arrigo. She is unable to share in the general excitement of the upcoming battles. A German prisoner, Marcovaldo, who has been given some degree of freedom by Rolando, declares his love for Lida, but she is outraged and refuses him.

As Rolando returns home, bringing with him Arrigo, Lida is angry (A frenarti o cor nel petto / "My heart, no longer have I the power..."). When Arrigo arrives, he is clearly upset to see Lida married to his best friend. But with Rolando suddenly called away to the Senate by the news that Barbarossa's troops are on the move, Arrigo and Lida are left alone. She tries to explain that her father encouraged her to marry Rolando after all believed that Arrigo had been killed in battle. But Arrigo will not listen and does not believe her. He declares her a "faithless one", and hurries away, wishing only to die in the forthcoming battle.

=== Act 2 – "Barbarossa!" ===
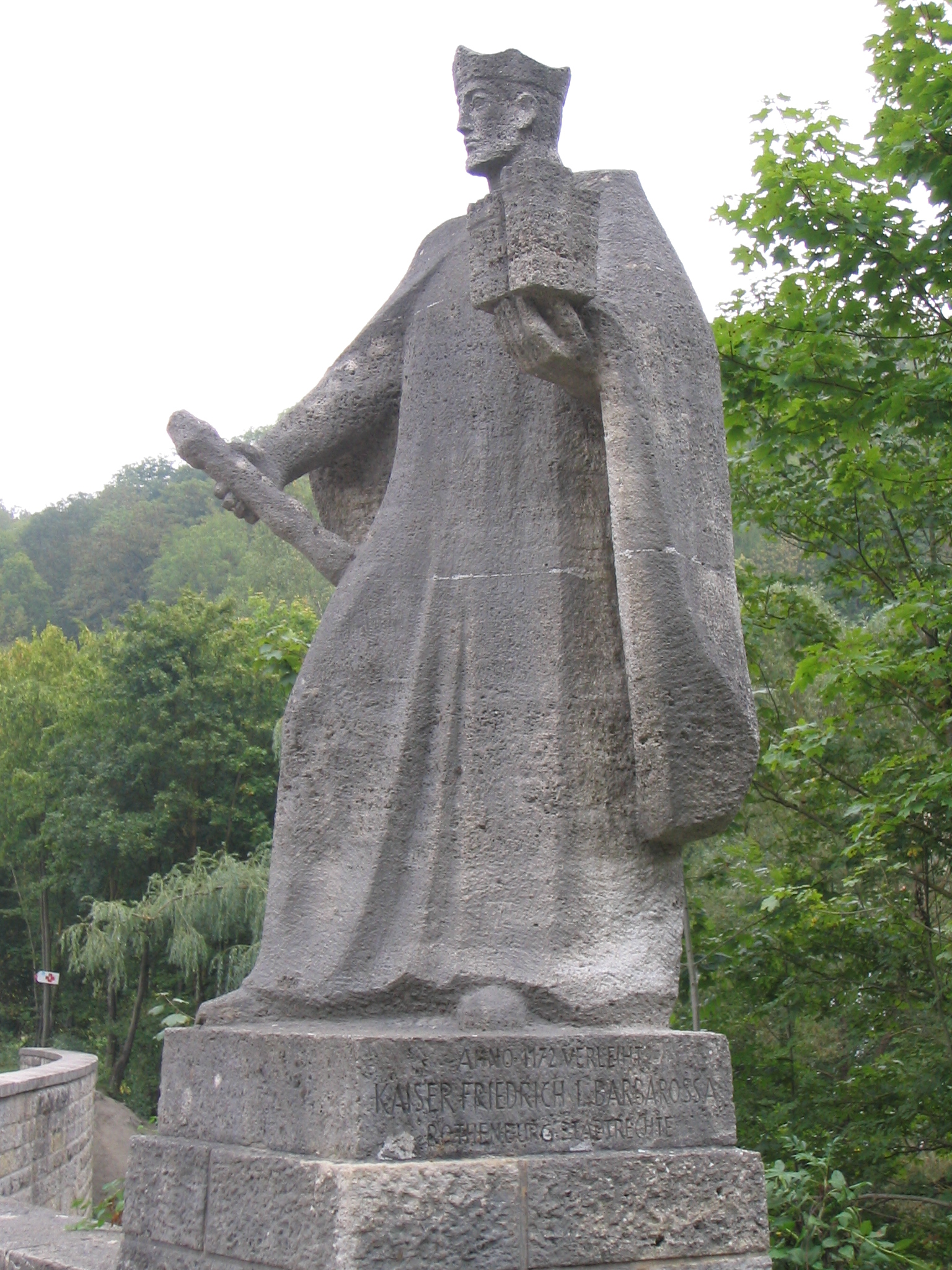
Statue of Barbarossa

The town hall of Como

The city fathers of Como have gathered to await the arrival of Rolando and Arrigo as ambassadors of the League from Milan. Como has been forced to come to terms with the invaders, and when the two men arrive, they announce that a new army has invaded from the north, that Barbarossa is having problems in Padua, and they seek Como's help, pointing out that the city lies between Milan and the invaders. They hope that Como will intervene to help the Italian cause. Suddenly, Barbarossa himself appears, proclaiming that "I am Italy's great destiny". His troops have surrounded Como and now further threaten Milan. He demands that Arrigo and Rolando return to Milan and seek its submission.

=== Act 3 – "Infamy!" ===
Scene 1: The Basilica of Sant' Ambrogio

In the subterranean vaults of the Basilica, Arrigo is inducted into the Knights of Death, warriors who have pledged to fight to the death rather than suffer defeat or imprisonment. All unite to swear an oath to support the cause of Italy (Giuriam d'Italia por fine ai danni / "We swear to put an end to Italy's wrongs") and to drive the foreign forces back across the Alps.

Scene 2: Rolando's castle

Lida has heard that Arrigo has joined the Knights of Death, and desperately tries to contact him via a note to be conveyed by her maid, Imelda. As Imelda is about to leave, Rolando suddenly enters to say farewell to Lida and to their son, whom he has brought to him. Imelda hides the note, then quickly leaves. Rolando tells Lida to convey his love of country to their son, and to bring the boy up to love the fatherland (Digli ch'è sangue italico / "Tell him he is of Italian blood").

Arrigo enters, summoned by Rolando, who does not know that his friend has joined the Knights of Death. Thinking that Arrigo has been ordered to remain to guard Milan, Rolando begs him to take care of his wife and son in the event of his death (Se al nuovo dì pugnando /"If when we fight on the morrow"). The two men part company, Rolando moved by grief, Arrigo with embarrassment. Just as Rolando is about to leave, Marcovaldo delays him, telling him that his honour has been betrayed and presents him with Lida's note to Arrigo, which he has intercepted. Rolando is enraged and proclaims that he will obtain double vengeance on his wife and his friend (Mi scoppa il cor / "My heart is bursting").

Scene 3: A room in the tower

Having received no response to her note, Lida goes to see Arrigo in his room in the tower, where he is writing a farewell letter to his mother. Although they declare their love for each other, he tells her that he has not received any note. Lida tries to persuade him to abandon his suicidal quest while he distraughtly recounts his dismay at finding her married. Finally, Lida says that they must separate for the sake of her husband and child. Then Rolando is heard at the door and, before he enters, Lida hides on the balcony.

Rolando confronts Arrigo, telling him that he now knows about his vow to the Knights of Death and encourages him to depart. Then he opens the balcony door and discovers Lida. Rolando is in a rage while Arrigo confesses his love for Lida but asks for death. Lida then declares that she is the guilty one. Still raging, Rolando storms out to lead the Milanese troops into battle, but as he leaves, he locks the tower door on Arrigo and Lida, declaring that Arrigo will suffer a fate worse than death: the infamy of being absent from the battle in which he had promised to fight, and so will lose his honour. As trumpets signal the beginning of the battle, Arrigo, in desperation, leaps from the tower into the moat, shouting "Long Live Italy!". Lida remains in anguish.

=== Act 4 – "To Die For the Fatherland!" ===
A square in Milan

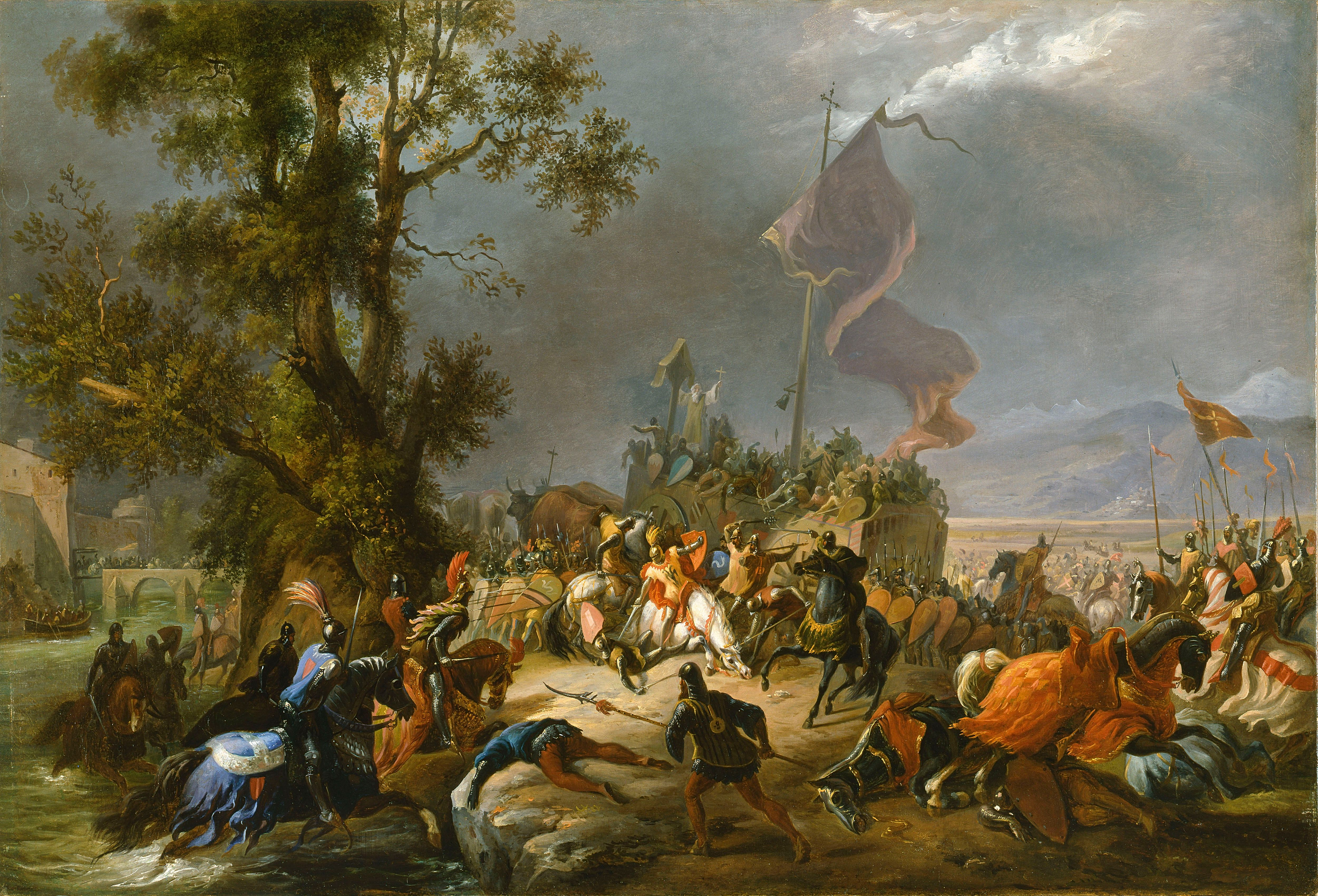
The Battle of Legnano by Massimo d'Azeglio, 1831

The assembled people sing a prayer for victory. Imelda assures Lida that Arrigo survived his leap from the tower and Lida prays for the safety of both Arrigo and her husband (Ah se di Arrigo e Rolando / "Ah! If I recommend to Thy care the lives of Arrigo and Rolando".) As the people begin a hymn of victory, city officials enter the church to confirm the defeat of Barbarossa's troops by the Lombard League, declaring that Barbarossa was wounded by Arrigo. But, in the middle of the victory celebrations, a group of Knights of Death enter bearing the mortally wounded Arrigo. Rolando receives Arrigo's assurance that Lida is innocent and that she had always acted honourably. Reconciling with Lida, he forgives Arrigo, who with his last breath, proclaims that "Italy is saved!"

== Music ==
Overall, Julian Budden sees this opera in musical terms as "the most consistently accomplished that Verdi ha[d] yet written" and adds that several musical elements exist here "as being designed and scored with an attention to detail for which one looks in vain in Attila or I masnadieri". A writer then working in England, Budden finds that the opera had "better press" in that country than in Italy and he quotes from supporting statements by Verdi biographers Toye (p. 290, 1931) and Osborne (p. 198, 1969). Roger Parker is impressed by the opera's "inner working and its sheer scale [which] far outstrip any of Verdi's previous efforts", largely agreeing with Budden in this account.

Since Baldini notes that Italian critics and writers were far less enthusiastic about this opera than the English ones (and maybe because he is Italian), he notes that there are only three of the "young Verdi's best-constructed, most thoughtful pages, but these saving graces are infrequent": he then names these as the overture, the Chorus of the Knights of Death [act 3], and the whole of act 4." But he does mention one other important thing which has come up in the earlier operas as well, especially I due Foscari, the difference between the "public" and the "private" aspects of the opera.

== Recordings ==
Year	Cast (Lida; Arrigo; Rolando; Federico)	Conductor, Opera House and Orchestra	Label
1951	Caterina Mancini, Amedeo Berdini, Rolando Panerai, Albino Gaggi	Fernando Previtali, Orchestra Sinfonica e Coro della Rai di Roma	Audio CD: Warner Fonit
1961	Antonietta Stella, Franco Corelli, Ettore Bastianini, Marco Stefanoni	Gianandrea Gavazzeni, Orchestra e Coro del Teatro alla Scala, Milano	
1963	Leyla Gencer, João Gibin, Ugo Savarese,	Francesco Molinari-Pradelli , Coro e Orchestra del Teatro Giuseppe Verdi di Trieste	Audio CD: Gala 2001 Remastered
1977	Katia Ricciarelli, José Carreras, Matteo Manuguerra, Nicola Ghiuselev	Lamberto Gardelli, ORF Symphony Orchestra and Chorus, Vienna	Audio CD: Philips; Cat: 422-435-2
2001	Elisabete Matos, Cesar Hernandez, Giorgio Cebrian, Manrico Signorini	Nello Santi, Teatro Massimo Bellini Orchestra and Chorus (Video recording of a performance in the Teatro Massimo Bellini di Catania, December)	DVD: Bongiovanni; Cat: AB20001
2012	Dimitra Theodossiou, Andrew Richards, Leonardo López Linares, Enrico Giuseppe Iori	Boris Brott, Teatro Lirico Giuseppe Verdi di Trieste	DVD:C Major; Cat:722704
