= Teresa De Giuli Borsi =

Italian opera singer (1817–1877)

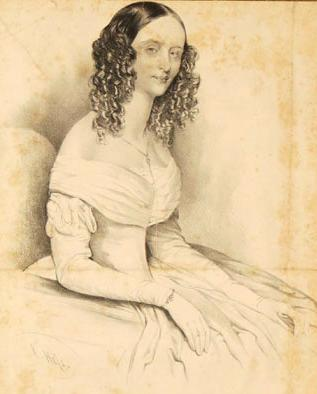
Teresa De Giuli Borsi c. 1845

Teresa De Giuli Borsi, born Maria Teresa Pippeo, (26 October 1817 – 18 November 1877) was an Italian opera singer who excelled in the dramatic soprano repertoire of the mid-19th century. She was considered a particularly distinguished interpreter of Verdian heroines and created the role of Lida in La battaglia di Legnano, which Verdi wrote expressly for her.
