= Fabio Sartori =

Italian opera singer

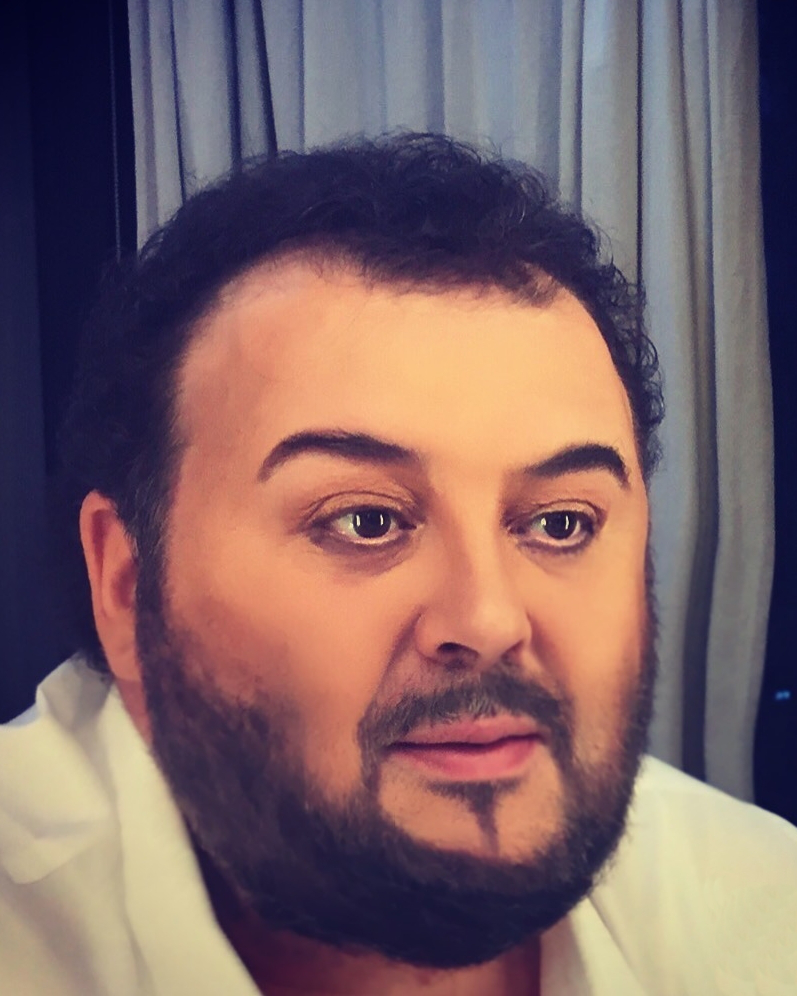
Fabio Sartori in 2017

Fabio Sartori (born 1970) is an Italian operatic tenor. He is particularly known for his interpretations of Italian roles by Giuseppe Verdi, Giacomo Puccini and of the Verismo.

== Early life and education ==
Sartori was born in Treviso, in the Veneto region of Italy, and first worked as a welder. He began to study singing with Renato Bardi Barbon and subsequently obtained a diploma in voice at the Conservatorio di Musica Benedetto Marcello di Venezia, where his teacher was Leone Magiera.

== Early career ==
Fabio Sartori was first a member of the choir of the Teatro La Fenice in Venice, where he made his professional operatic debut as a soloist as Rodolfo in La bohème in 1996. Already one year later he made his debut at the Teatro alla Scala in the season inauguration premiere of Giuseppe Verdi's Macbeth conducted by Riccardo Muti. In the same 1997/98 season he was the tenor soloist of Giuseppe Verdi's Messa da Requiem, also conducted by Muti with La Scala and Barbara Frittoli, Luciana d'Intino and Roberto Scandiuzzi. In 1998, he debuted in two important Verdi roles: Gabriele Adorno in Simon Boccanegra at the Teatro Comunale of Bologna and the title role of Don Carlo, again in Bologna and at Teatro Regio of Parma. He debuted in Berlin in 1999 in Simon Boccanegra conducted by Claudio Abbado. In the same year he debuted at the Vienna State Opera in Linda di Chamounix, and at the Chicago Lyric Opera in I Capuleti e i Montecchi. This was the beginning of an international career that led him to all of the most important opera houses and festivals.

== Collaboration with the Teatro alla Scala ==
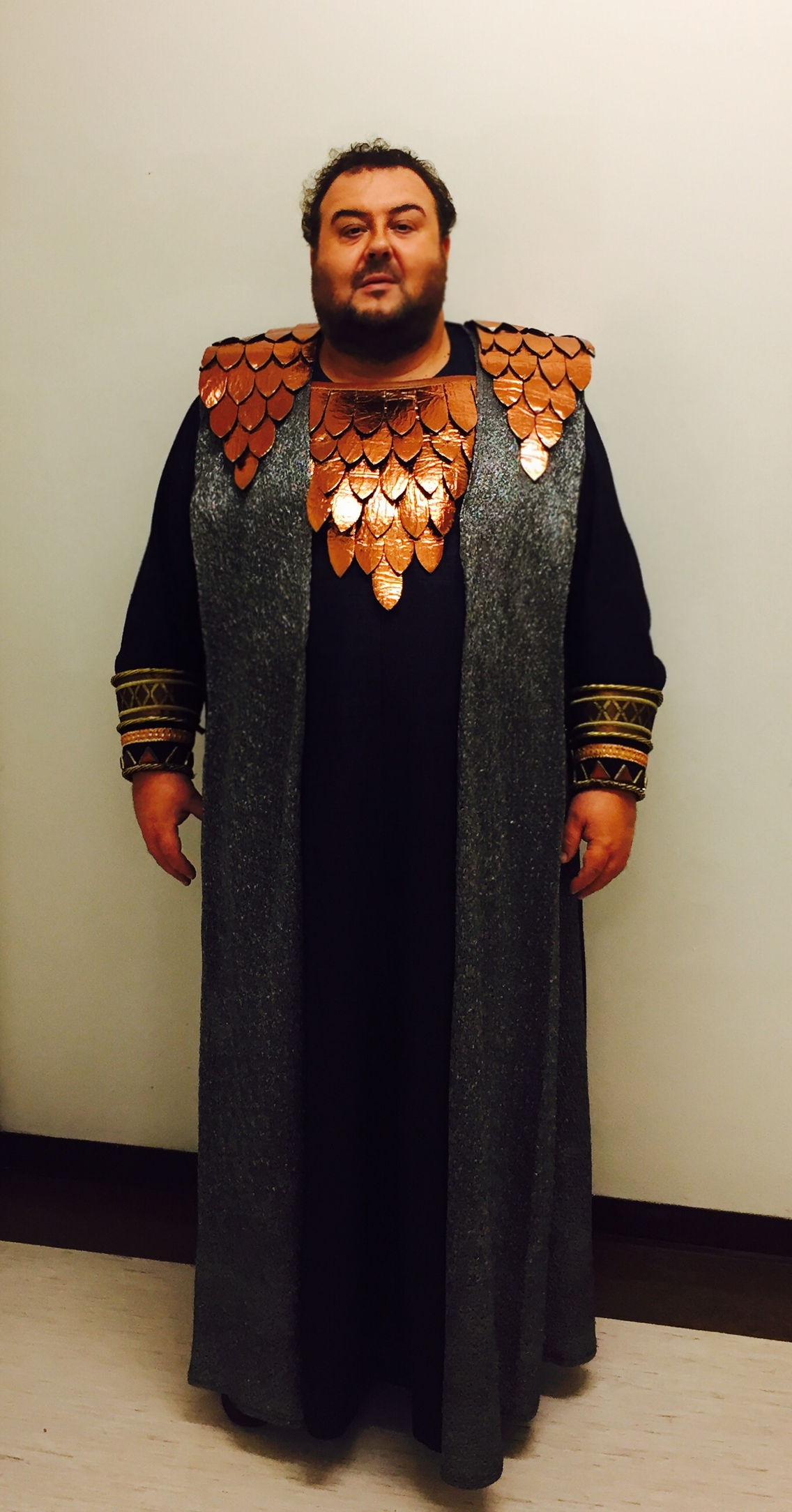
Fabio Sartori as Radamès in Aida

His many performances at the prestigious Teatro alla Scala include his house debut in the season inauguration premiere of Macbeth in 1997, Rodolfo in La bohème in the 2007/2008 season, Iacopo Foscari in I due Foscari (2008/09), Gabriele Adorno in Simon Boccanegra (2009/10), Foresto in Attila (2010/11), the tenor soloist in Messa da Requiem, Riccardo in Oberto Conte di San Bonifacio, Radames in Aida, the title role in Don Carlo (2012/13), again Gabriele Adorno (2013/14), Radames (2014/15), Rodolfo in La bohème (2016/17), Gabriele Adorno and Radames (2017/18). At his 2013 performances in Oberto Conte di San Bonifacio, he was lauded by The New York Times for his "big voice". On December 7, 2018 he inaugurated the 2018/2019 season as Foresto in Attila under the baton of Riccardo Chailly ("The powerhouse Fabio Sartori unearthed hidden nuance in the tenor role of Foresto.", Financial Times ) and in June/July 2019 he performed Carlo in I masnadieri to great critical acclaim ("The Herculean Fabio Sartori packed a mighty vocal punch, fitting for this all-guns-blazing production... ." Financial Times).

== Important recent performances ==
Important recent performances in roles by Giuseppe Verdi have included: Gabriele Adorno in Simon Boccanegra in Zurich, Berlin, Vienna, Barcelona, Madrid, on tour with La Scala in Taipei, Seoul and Moscow, Foresto in Attila in concert with Zubin Mehta and the Orchestra of Maggio Musicale Fiorentino in Mombay, Carlo in I masnadieri at the Zurich Opernhaus, at the Teatro alla Scala and in Savonlinna, Radames in a new staging of Aida at the Arena of Verona, at the Teatro Real in Madrid, Don Carlo in Zurich, Riccardo in Un ballo in maschera at the Gran Teatre del Liceu, Cavaradossi in a new staging of Tosca at the Staatsoper Unter den Linden in Berlin conducted by Daniel Barenboim, Verdi's Messa da Requiem conducted by Gianandrea Noseda in a Tournee with Teatro Regio of Turin at the Mariinsky Theatre in St. Petersburg, and his debut in the title role of Il trovatore in Liège in 2018. About his 2018 performances as Macduff in a new production of Macbeth at the Staatsoper Unter den Linden with Anna Netrebko as Lady Macbeth and Placido Domingo in the title role conducted by Daniel Barenboim, the German newspaper Die Zeit wrote that Sartori sang with "captivating glaze" . Other noteworthy performances include Pollione in Vincenzo Bellini's Norma at the Deutsche Oper Berlin and in Rome, Maurizio in Francesco Cilea's Adriana Lecouvreur in Florence, and his debut at the Royal Opera House Covent Garden with Canio in Ruggero Leoncavallo's Pagliacci.

== Current engagements ==
In 2020 he is scheduled to sing Pinkerton in Madama Butterfly at the Vienna State Opera, Cavaradossi in Tosca and Pollione in Norma at the Teatro San Carlo in Naples, Rodolfo in La bohème in Turin and Riccardo in Un ballo in maschera at the Teatro alla Scala. He is also scheduled to make his role debuts as Otello (Verdi) at the Maggio Musicale of Florence and as Arrigo in I vespri siciliani at the Salzburg Festival.

== Discography ==
=== DVDs ===
- 2007: Nabucco from the Arena di Verona, Decca Classics (Catalogue No: 0743245)
- 2012: Oberto from the Teatro Regio Parma, CMajor Entertainment (Catalogue No: 720008)
- 2012: Simon Boccanegra from Teatro alla Scala, Arthaus Musik 2012 (EAN: 0807280159592)
- 2014: Aida from Arena di Verona, BelAir Classiques 2014 (Catalogue No: 3760115301047)
- 2014: Aida from Teatro alla Scala, CMajor Entertainment 2015 (Catalogue No: 732304)
- 2019: Attila from Teatro Comunale Bologna, CMajor Entertainment (Catalogue No: 748708)

=== CD ===
- 2009: La Rondine from the Puccini Festival Torre del Lago, Naxos (cat.no. 8.660253-54)
