= Saint-Hilaire-de-Lusignan =

Saint-Hilaire-de-Lusignan Sent Alari de Lusinhan (Occitan)
- Commune
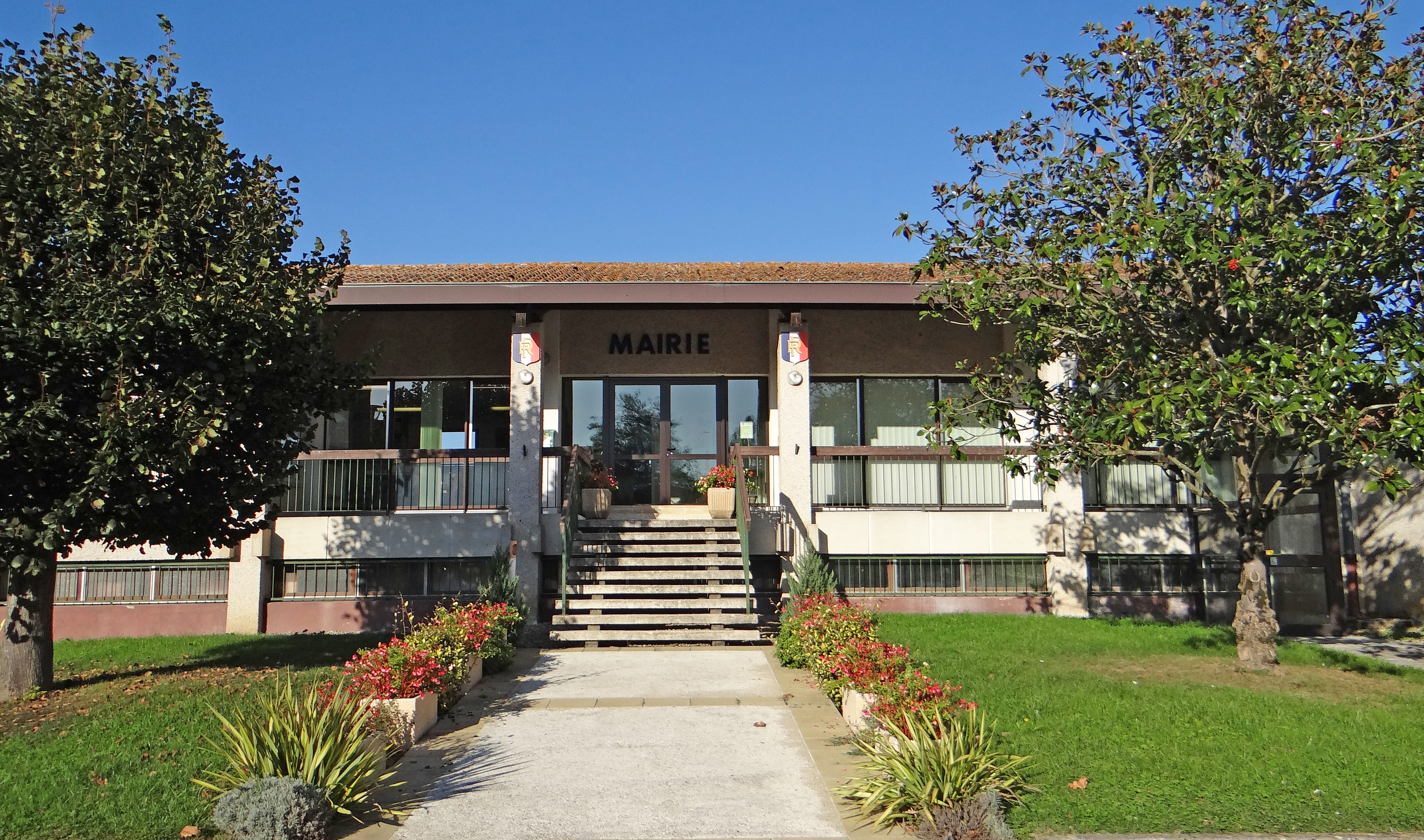
- The town hall in Saint-Hilaire-de-Lusignan

- Coat of arms
- Location of Saint-Hilaire-de-Lusignan
- Location within France Location within Nouvelle-Aquitaine
- Coordinates: 44°13′38″N 0°30′48″E
- Country: France
- Region: Nouvelle-Aquitaine
- Department: Lot-et-Garonne
- Arrondissement: Agen
- Canton: L'Ouest agenais
- Intercommunality: Agglomération d'Agen

Government
  - Mayor (2024–2026): Philippe Maurin
- Area^{1}: 16.77 km^{2} (6.47 sq mi)
- Elevation: 45 m (148 ft)
- Highest elevation: 196 m (643 ft)
- Lowest elevation: 32 m (105 ft)
- Population (2023): 1,501
  - Density: 89.51/km^{2} (231.8/sq mi)
- Time zone: UTC+01:00 (CET)
  - Summer (DST): UTC+02:00 (CEST)
- INSEE/Postal code: 47246 /47450
- ^{1} French Land Register data, which excludes lakes, ponds, glaciers > 1 km^{2} (0.386 sq mi or 247 acres) and river estuaries.

Saint-Hilaire-de-Lusignan (French pronunciation: [sɛ̃.t‿ilɛʁ də lyziɲɑ̃], literally Saint-Hilaire of Lusignan; Occitan: Sent Alari de Lusinhan) is a commune in the Lot-et-Garonne department in south-western France.

== See also ==
- Communes of the Lot-et-Garonne department
