= Felix Krieger =

German musician and conductor

Felix Krieger (born 1975 in Freiburg im Breisgau) is a German conductor.

== Biography ==
Krieger began to study piano at age 6, and viola at age 11. At 15 he entered the Musikhochschule of his hometown to study piano, harpsichord and music theory. He studied conducting with Klauspeter Seibel at Hochschule für Musik und Theater Hamburg and was a masterstudent of Carlo Maria Giulini at Scuola di Musica di Fiesole. At the same time he worked as an assistant conductor to Claudio Abbado at the Berlin Philharmonic. In Bayreuth he was assistant conductor to Daniele Gatti and Philippe Jordan for Stefan Herheim's production of Parsifal.

Since 2010 Felix Krieger is artistic director and principal conductor of the Berliner Operngruppe.

Following early engagements in the opera houses of Kassel and Theater Bielefeld (1st koord. Kapellmeister), in which he acquired a diverse operatic repertoire, Krieger conducted a successful debut ballet performance in 2003 of Schumann's second symphony at the Staatsoper Berlin. Since then he led the Staatskapelle Berlin in several occasions.

Krieger conducted many internationally renowned orchestras, including the BBC Scottish Symphony Orchestra, Deutsches Symphonie-Orchester Berlin, Staatskapelle Berlin, Staatskapelle Dresden, The London Sinfonietta, Münchner Rundfunkorchester, Orchestre de l’Opéra National de Paris, Stuttgarter Kammerorchester, Bach Collegium Stuttgart / Gächinger Kantorei and SWR Sinfonieorchester Baden-Baden und Freiburg.

On the Shanghai Spring Music Festival in 2002 he conducted leading musicians of the Chicago Symphony Orchestra on their first-ever trip to China in cooperation with the Shanghai Symphony Orchestra.

He is a regular guest conductor at major operahouses such as Staatsoper Berlin, Semperoper Dresden, Paris Opera or Teatro Comunale di Bologna.

In 2018 his album "The Art of Ensemble" with works of the Spanish Catalan composer Benet Casablancas and The London Sinfonietta was released by Sony Classical Records.

In March 2020, he released Mascagni's opera Iris with the Berliner Operngruppe for Oehms Classics

He is the nephew of musicologist Christoph Wolff.
