= Frank Hird =

Frank Hird OBE
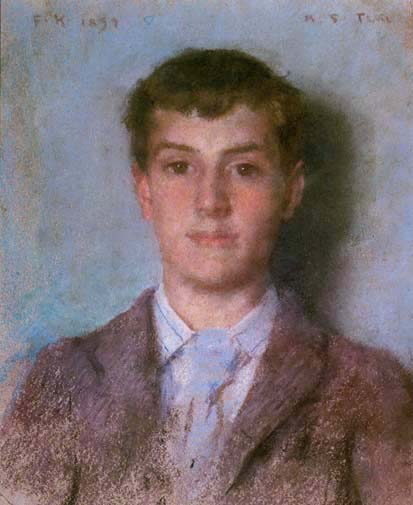
- Portrait of Hird, by Henry Scott Tuke
- Born: Robert Francis Hird; 1873; Hull, England
- Died: 2 November 1937; Westminster, London
- Occupation(s): Writer, journalist
- Spouse: Gladys Sinclair (m. 1921–1937)
- Partner: Lord Ronald Gower

Robert Francis Hird OBE (1873 – 2 November 1937) was a journalist, author and lover of politician, sculptor and writer Lord Ronald Gower (1845–1916).

== Early life ==
Robert Francis Hird was born in 1873 in Hull, England, the son of James Hird.

At first he was the secretary of Henry Thring, 1st Baron Thring, but he later became a journalist and author.

== Relationship with Lord Ronald Gower ==
Frank Hird met Lord Ronald Gower in June 1893. In April 1895, they were together in Venice visiting with Horatio Brown. In February 1898, Hird was the Rome correspondent for the Morning Post, a position he had obtained through Gower's friend, Dunn, editor of the journal. He was known by the Anglo-Americans in Rome as "the post-boy", due to his young age. Hird was engaged to a woman, but he accepted Gower's offer to live with him and broke the engagement.

About them, Oscar Wilde remarked, on one occasion, "Frank may be seen, but not Hird." The nickname of Hird was "The Bébé" (he also signed his letters like this). They lived together and to regularize their relationship, Gower took the unusual step of legally adopting Hird.

Later in life Gower bought Hammerfield, a large Victorian house at Penshurst, Kent. After being financially ruined by Francis Shackleton—Gower lost £40,000 (£4,971,604 in 2023 Sterling) and Hird £6,000 (£745,741 in 2023 Sterling)— they moved to the smaller Mayo House on Mount Ephraim, Rusthall, Kent. Hird accused Shackleton's brother, explorer Ernest Shackleton, of involvement in the fraud. Ernest Shackleton sued him, and Hird promised to Sir Arthur Vicars, who was investigating the theft of the Irish Crown Jewels, "revelations... unless E.S. funks an exposure". But in the end Hird recanted his words.

On 15 November 1914, Hird organized a concert at the Pump Room on The Pantiles, in Tunbridge Wells, for the Belgian Colony who lived there. Nearly 600 people, mostly Belgians, attended and the Kent & Sussex Courier described it as "a gathering unique in the history of the town". The entire programme was in French, and one of the attendees told Hird that it was "just like being at home".

In November 1914, Hird volunteered at West Hall VAD Hospital, and in October 1915, he was appointed Secretary to the newly opened Kingswood Park VAD Hospital. From 1917-1918, during World War I, Hird was a Church Army Commissioner. He was an Officer of the Order of the British Empire (O.B.E.).

=== Later life ===
Gower died in 1916 and in 1920, Hird proposed to Delia Whitaker, one of Gower's friends, but she rejected him. By 1921, Hird was engaged to "a nice young lady, suitable in every way and with money", Gladys Sinclair. Or so he thought. She was actually 42, 6 years younger than Hird at the time, and not so wealthy. The marriage, which took place on 5 July 1921, was suggested by her uncle, Colonel Hugh Sinclair. Gladys Sinclair (d. 6 May 1943) was the daughter of Walter Sinclair and Kathleen Dickinson.

Hird died on 2 November 1937 in Westminster, London, and was buried with Gower at St Paul's Church, Rusthall, Kent, as Hird had asked. Later, Gladys Sinclair's ashes were buried with them.

== Works ==
- Fries Good Angel, a one-act comedy, by Frank Hird and Cecil Crofton, produced by Percy Alarshall at the Theatre Royal, Newcastle, on 23 May 1894
- The Revenge of Elspeth Donnacombe, short story, 4 May 1895
- A Day of Solitude Royal, short story, 19 October 1895
- Venetian Beads, published in The Girl's Own Paper, 1 February 1896
- The Saunterers, short story, 11 April 1896
- The Binding of a Book (1897)
- A Feminine Impulse, short story, 17 July 1897
- The Cry of the Children: An Exposure of Certain British Industries in Which Children are Iniquitously Employed (1898)
- Rosa Bonheur (1904)
- Mrs Ashley's Opinion (1904), a costume play
- Victoria the Woman (1908)
- The Deeper Stain (1909)
- The Romance of a Great Singer – A Memoir of Mario, with Mrs Godfrey Pearse (1910)
- Lancashire Stories: Containing All That Appeals To The Heart And The Imagination In The Lancashire Of To-Day And Of Many Yesterdays (c.1912)
- The Bannantyne Sapphires (1928)
- The fourth road (1934)
- H. M. Stanley. The authorized life, the biography of Henry Morton Stanley, (1935)
