= Lord Ronald Gower =

British politician (1845–1916)

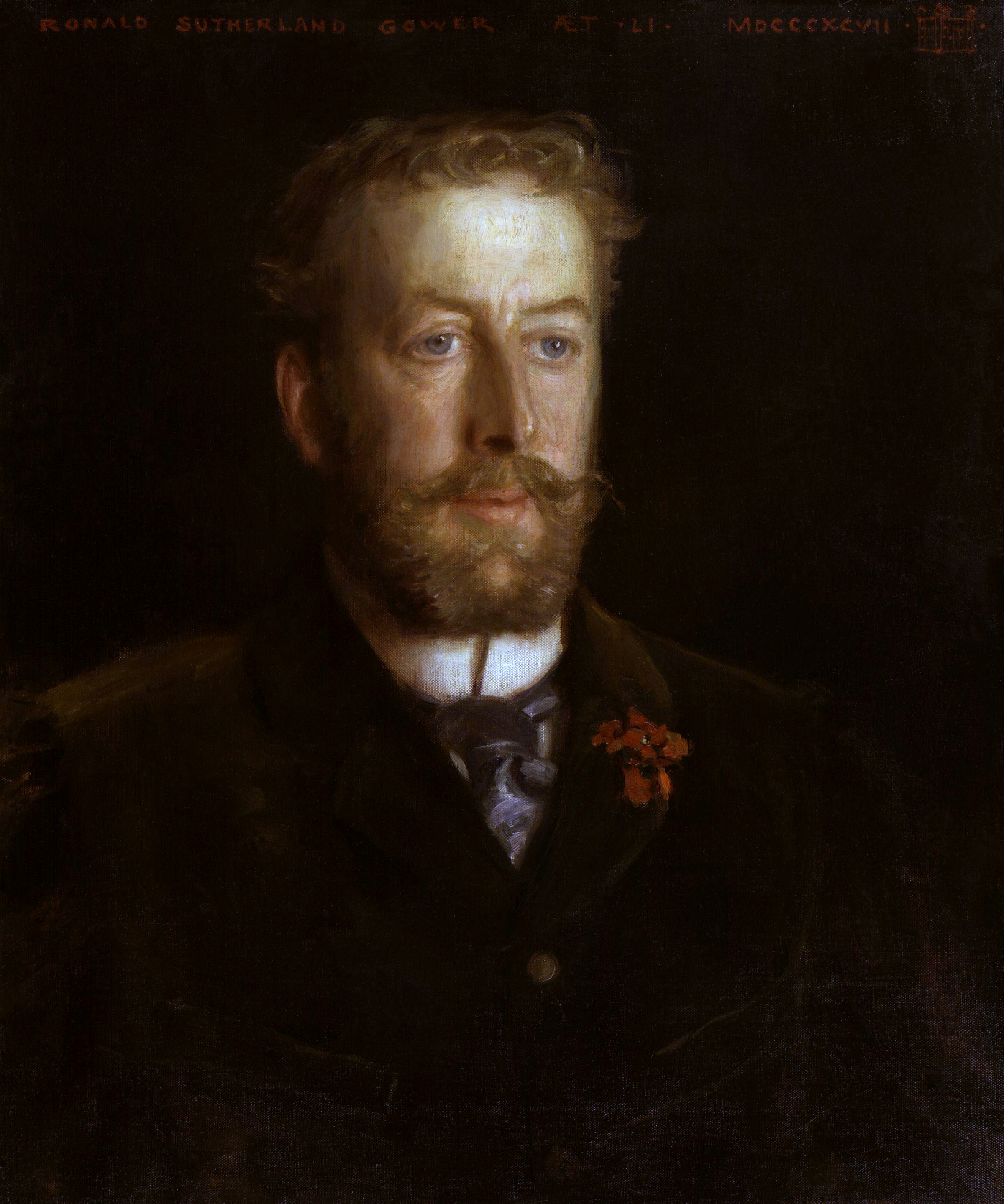
- Portrait of Lord Ronald Gower by Henry Scott Tuke, 1897

Member of Parliament for Sutherland
- In office 1867–1874
- Preceded by: David Dundas
- Succeeded by: Marquess of Stafford

Personal details
- Born: Ronald Charles Sutherland-Leveson-Gower; 2 August 1845
- Died: 9 March 1916 (aged 70) Tunbridge Wells, Kent, UK
- Party: Liberal
- Relations: See Leveson-Gower family
- Parent(s): George, 2nd Duke of Sutherland; Lady Harriet Howard
- Education: Eton College
- Alma mater: Trinity College, Cambridge

Lord Ronald Charles Sutherland-Leveson-Gower (2 August 1845 – 9 March 1916), was a Scottish sculptor, best known for his statue of Shakespeare in Stratford-upon-Avon. He also wrote biographies of Marie Antoinette and Joan of Arc, as well as serving as Liberal Member of Parliament for Sutherland. He was accused by the Prince of Wales of "unnatural practices" and was one of several society figures implicated in the Cleveland Street Scandal, where a male brothel was raided by police.

== Early life ==
Born on 2 August 1845, he was the youngest son of eleven children, seven daughters and four sons, born to George, 2nd Duke of Sutherland (and 20th Earl) by his wife Lady Harriet Howard. His surviving siblings included Lady Elizabeth Georgiana (1824–1878), who married the 8th Duke of Argyll; Lady Evelyn Gower (1825–1869), who married the 12th Lord Blantyre; Lady Caroline Gower (1827–1887), who married the 4th Duke of Leinster; George Gower (1828–1892), who became the 3rd Duke of Sutherland; Lady Constance Gower (1834–1880), who married the 1st Duke of Westminster; and Lord Albert Gower (1843–1874), who married Grace Abdy.

His paternal grandparents were George Leveson-Gower, 1st Duke of Sutherland and his wife Elizabeth Gordon, suo jure Countess of Sutherland. His maternal grandparents were George Howard, 6th Earl of Carlisle and Lady Georgiana Cavendish (1783–1858), herself the daughter of William Cavendish, 5th Duke of Devonshire, and Lady Georgiana Spencer.

He was educated at Eton and at Trinity College, Cambridge.

== Career ==
From 1867 to 1874, Gower served as a Liberal Member of Parliament for Sutherland. He made only one speech in the House during those seven years. Reportedly, "it was with some relief that, with the resignation of Gladstone's government at the beginning of 1874, he relinquished" his seat. He was succeeded as MP by his nephew Cromartie, Marquess of Stafford (the elder surviving son of his eldest brother the 3rd Duke of Sutherland).

He was a Trustee of the National Portrait Gallery and of the Birthplace and Shakespeare Memorial Building at Stratford-on-Avon.

In 1889, he travelled to America and donated several of his works to prominent American museums.

=== Creative work ===
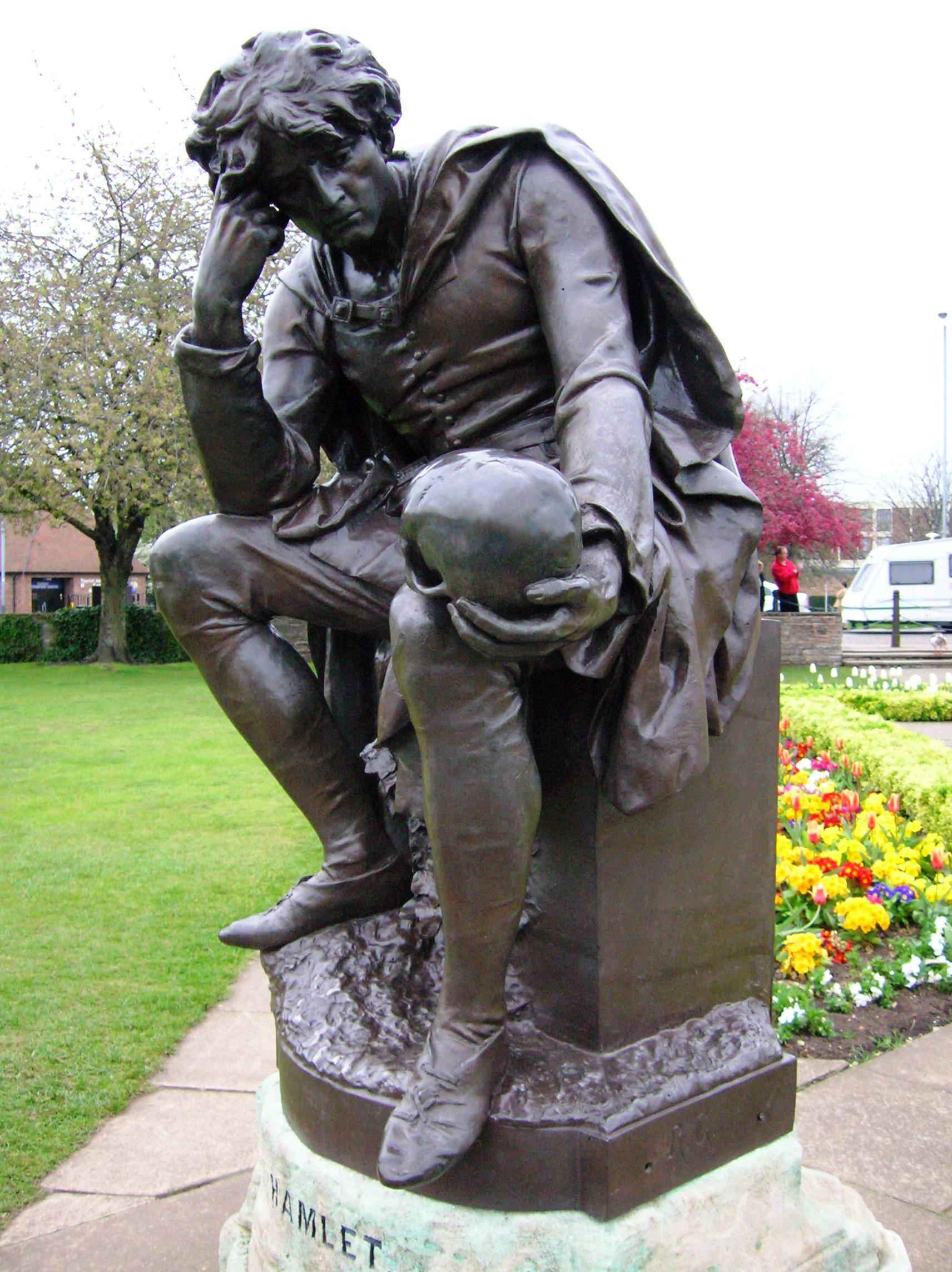
Gower's statue of Hamlet in Stratford-upon-Avon

A sculptor, he also published a number of works on the fine arts. Lord Ronald shared a studio in Sir Joshua Reynolds's old home in Leicester Square with John O'Connor, an Irish landscape painter and theatrical designer. In 1875, he travelled to Paris to begin sculpting in the studio of Albert-Ernest Carrier-Belleuse, one of the founding members of the Société Nationale des Beaux-Arts.

Gower's most important sculpture was the statue of Shakespeare and four of his principal characters, erected in Stratford-upon-Avon. He also created a sculpture depicting Marie Antoinette on her way to the scaffold and another of a member of the Old Guard at Waterloo.

He also wrote biographies of Marie Antoinette and Joan of Arc and a history of the Tower of London. He furthermore published My Reminiscences (pub. 1883), which was a memoir of his upbringing and life, as well as Old Diaries 1881–1901 (pub. 1902).

== Personal life ==
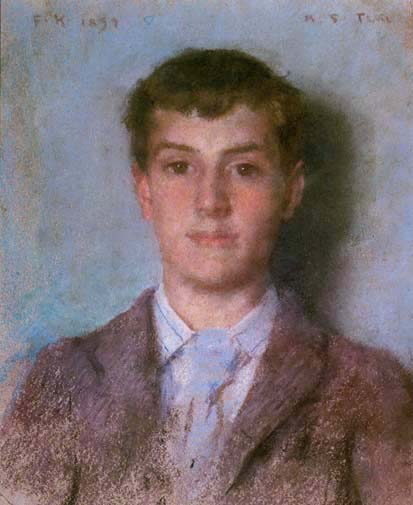
Gower's lover Frank Hird in 1894, chalk drawing by Henry Scott Tuke.

Gower, who never married, was well known in the homosexual community of the time. Oscar Wilde's story The Portrait of Mr. W. H. has been interpreted as a comment on Gower's social circle; Gower is generally identified as the model for Lord Henry Wotton in The Picture of Dorian Gray. In 1879, hints of his homosexual liaisons published in the journal Man of the World led Gower to sue the paper, but later in the year the Prince of Wales sent him a letter accusing him of being "a member of an association for unnatural practices", to which Gower wrote an angry reply.

John Addington Symonds, who stayed with him once, stated that Gower "saturates one's spirit in Urningthum [homosexuality] of the rankest most diabolical kind". His most lasting relationship was with the journalist and author Frank Hird (1873–1937), whom he adopted in 1898. It led Oscar Wilde to remark on one occasion: "Frank may be seen, but not Hird." Gower died on 9 March 1916 at his home in Tunbridge Wells, Kent. He is buried, together with Hird, and Hird's wife (whom he married after Gower's death) at St Paul's Church, Rusthall, Kent.

=== 1889–90 scandal ===
Gower was one of several prominent figures implicated in the Cleveland Street Scandal, involving a homosexual brothel at that London address. However, the allegation may have been solely due to his associations: at the time of the scandal, he was living on the Continent.

=== 1913 scandal ===
In 1913, Francis 'Frank' Shackleton (brother of the famed Antarctic explorer Sir Ernest Shackleton) was charged with defrauding Gower of his fortune. In 1910, Gower had entrusted Shackleton with his investments. On his behalf, Shackleton sold his existing portfolio and purchased essentially worthless shares that benefited only himself. The amount stolen was more than £60,000. Shackleton was eventually prosecuted and imprisoned but only for defrauding a spinster friend of Gower even though it was for a far smaller sum. It has been surmised the legal oddity was due to the British government's desire not to provoke Shackleton, a key suspect in the theft of the Irish Crown Jewels in 1907 who might have caused him to publicly voice details of his prominent associations. Due to the loss of his fortune, Gower was forced to sell his country house, Hammerfield at Penshurst in Kent, to Arnold Hills.

== Bibliography ==
- Gower, Lord Ronald Sutherland. My Reminiscences, in 2 vols. (1883)
- Gower, Lord Ronald Sutherland. Old Diaries, 1881-1901 (1902)
- Jordaan, Peter (2023). A Secret Between Gentlemen: Suspects, Strays and Guests. Sydney: Alchemie Books. ISBN 9780645852745.

Parliament of the United Kingdom
Preceded by David Dundas	Member of Parliament for Sutherland; 1867–1874	Succeeded by Marquess of Stafford
