= Cecilia Maria de Candia =

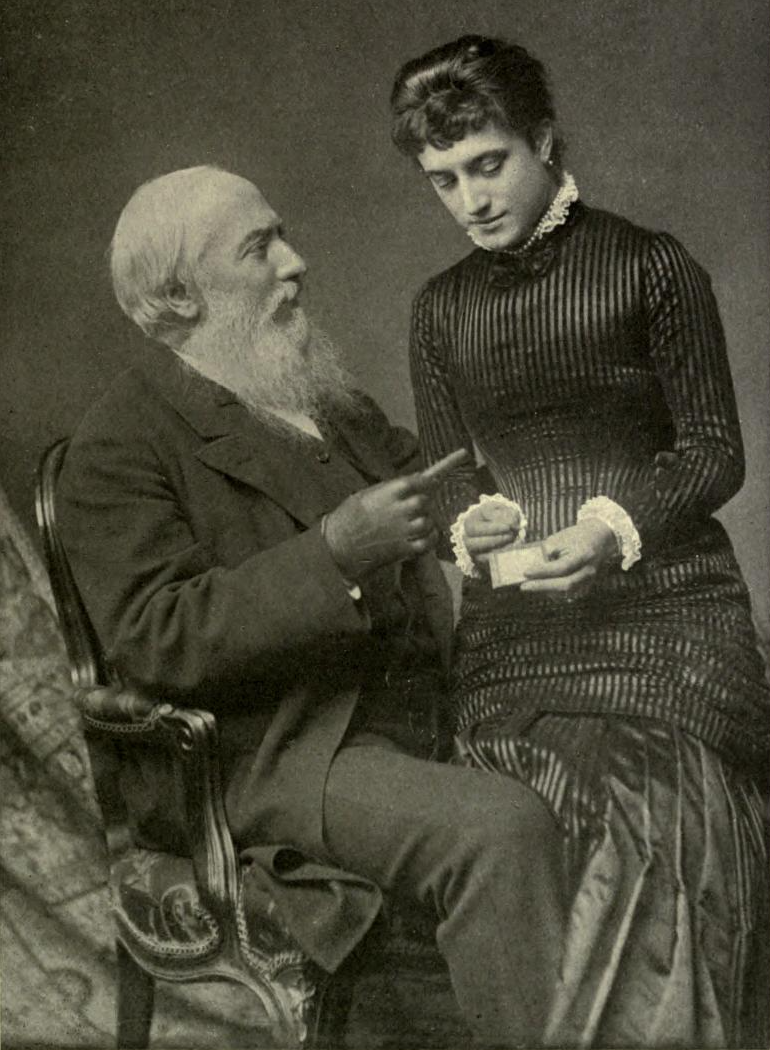
Mario and his daughter, Mrs Godfrey Pearse

Cecilia Maria de Candia (24 December 1853, Brighton, England – 26 May 1926, Bordighera, Italy), later Mrs Godfrey Pearse, was an Italian-British writer, amateur singer and society hostess. She was the daughter of two famous opera singers, Giulia Grisi and the Cavaliere don Giovanni Matteo de Candia, who sang under the popular name of Mario the tenor, the youngest son of Stefano de Candia, Royal Governor General of Nice, Marquis of Candia and Aide-de-Camp to the King of Sardinia, Carlo Felice di Savoia.

== Early life and family ==
In her childhood, she traveled extensively with her parents, who moved their main home from Florence to Paris, and after moving seasonally to the UK they eventually settled in London in 1869. Cecilia Maria grew up surrounded by the artistic elite of Europe, her parents' friends, and colleagues: opera singers, musicians, designers, art lovers, royalty, and the social elite of the time. The de Candia family was part of the Italian nobility, and at birth, Cecilia Maria was registered as Cecilia Maria de Candia, Noble Lady (Italian: Nobile Donna) of the United Kingdom of Italy.

== Marriage ==
The marriage of Cecilia Maria de Candia and Godfrey Pearse, a "fencing champion", took place on 29 February 1872, at St Pauls, Wilton Grove in the City of London. The marriage, civil union, and registry took place at St George's Hanover Square in January 1872. They lived first in London, and some seasons in Brighton; eventually, the new couple started to spend time in Paris, at Cecilia's sisters' homes, and also in Italy at the de Candia residences. They were good friends and correspondents of the American painter James McNeill Whistler.

After constant issues of her husband's infidelity with young men, Cecilia Maria requested a separation. The couple finally divorced in 1889. They successfully continued a business relationship, related to editorial projects and the launching of books.

== Works ==
Her main attraction to writing was developed during her early years of adolescence, she was a passionate and romantic young lady, always in love with the music and lyrics of the day. She took her passion as an inspiration to write along her trips across Europe. Some of her earliest works were kept by her tutors. She also wrote poems that were converted into paintings by some famous artists of the day, the most prolific writing period was creating journalist society content while working with her good friend and colleague the British writer and journalist Frank Hird.

After her marriage to Mr Pearse, she started to dedicate her time to gardening and eventually created some interesting texts relating Victorian Herbalistic Science transferring knowledge to cooking; other times she dedicated her writings to the "fantasy world of nature"; and finally explored the biographical and historical field of writing, composing some powerful books. Among them, the following ones were saved.

Most of her work was signed Maria Cecilia, or M.C. and only her published work was signed as Mrs Godfrey Pearse. She published three books:

- The Romance of a Great Singer: A Memoir of Mario (1910) (with Frank Hird);
- The Kitchen Garden and the Cook: An Alphabetical Guide to the Cultivation of Vegetables (1913);
- The Enchanted Past (1926), published by Chapman & Hall.

== Later life ==
After sharing homes in London and seasonal time in a Mediterranean residence in the Ligurian region, bordering Monaco and Piemonte, she decided to conduct research work for her next book at her father's home—the Villa Salviati in Tuscany collecting old letters and pictures; a short time afterward she contracted an illness and died at her Mediterranean cottage in Bordighera, Italy.

== Sources ==
- Brief biography from University of Glasgow's Whistler collection
- Mario and Grisi: A Biography, written by Elizabeth Forbes was published in London in 1985 by Victor Gollancz Ltd.
- De Candia Pearse family records at St. George's Hanover Square, Marriage Records of Jan-Mar 1872, City of London UK
- Baptism certificate of Don Giovanni Matteo De Candia, October 18, 1810, in Archbishop's Archives Cagliari, testifying that his father's nobility title was "Cavaliere", and his mother "Donna"(Nobil donna) Caterina Grixoni, from the Sardinian village Ozieri.
- Francesco Floris and Sergio Serra: "Storia della nobiltà in Sardegna", Ed. della Torre, Cagliari 1986.
