= Giulia Grisi =

Italian opera singer (1811–1869)

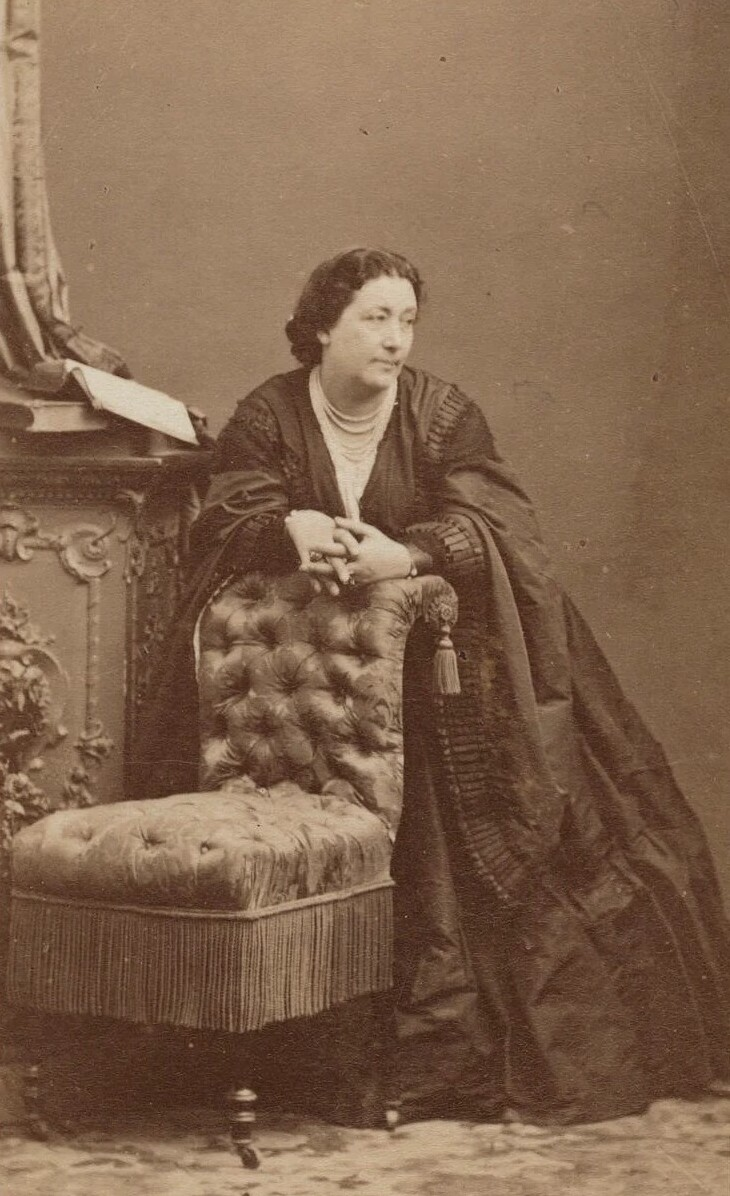
- Grisi c. late 1850s – c. early 1860s
- Born: 22 May 1811; Milan, Kingdom of Italy
- Died: 29 November 1869 (aged 58); Berlin, Kingdom of Prussia
- Resting place: Père Lachaise Cemetery, Paris
- Occupation: Operatic soprano
- Spouses: Gérard de Melcy (m. 1836; div. 1844) Giovanni Matteo de Candia (m. 1844)
- Partner: Frederick Stewart (1830s)
- Children: 7, including Cecilia Maria de Candia
- Relatives: Giuseppina Grassini (aunt); Giuditta Grisi (sister); Carlotta Grisi (cousin)

Giulia Grisi (22 May 1811 – 29 November 1869) was an Italian opera singer. She performed widely in Europe, the United States and South America and was among the leading sopranos of the 19th century.

Her second husband was Giovanni Matteo de Candia (also known as "Mario the Tenor"), scion of a noble family of the Kingdom of Sardinia. She is buried at Père Lachaise Cemetery in Paris. Her grave is marked "Juliette de Candia", styled in her married last name; usually better known by the courtesy title the Marquesse of Candia.

== Early life ==
Born in Milan, Giulia Grisi was the daughter of Giovanna (née Grassini) and Gaetano Grisi, one of Napoleon's Italian officers. She came from a musically gifted family, her maternal aunt Giuseppina Grassini (1773–1850) being a favourite opera singer both on the continent and in London. Her older sister, Giuditta and her cousin Carlotta were both performing artists, the former as a singer and the latter as a ballet dancer. Giuditta was the creator of the breeches role of Romeo in Bellini's I Capuleti e i Montecchi. She was also the cousin of singer Ernesta Grisi.

Grisi was trained for a musical career, making her stage debut as Emma in Rossini's Zelmira in Bologna in 1828.

== Operatic career ==
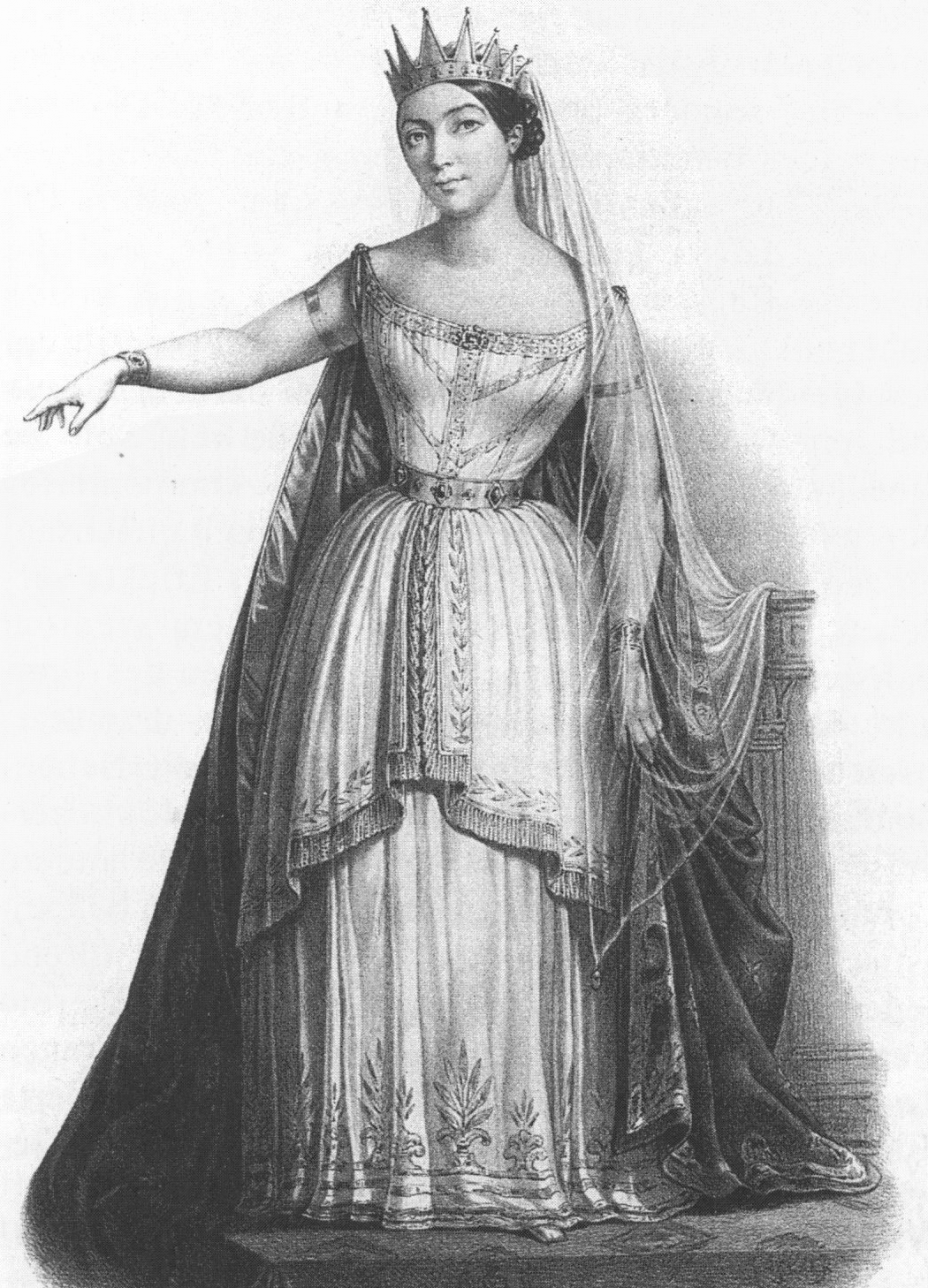
Grisi as Semiramide

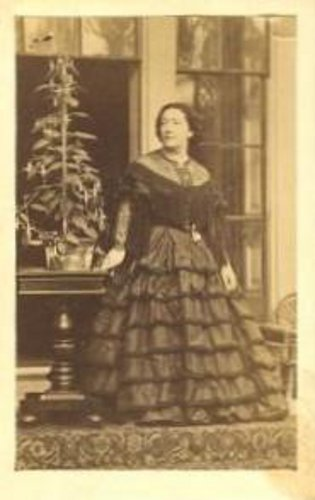
Giulia Grisi, photographed circa 1860

Rossini and Bellini both took an interest in her, she was the first to play the part of Adalgisa in Bellini's Norma in Milan, in which the dramatic soprano Giuditta Pasta took the title role. Grisi appeared in Paris in 1832 in the title role of Semiramide in Rossini's opera and was a great success; in 1834 she made her debut in London as Ninetta in La gazza ladra; and, again in Paris, in 1835 she created the role of Elvira in the premiere of Bellini's final opera, I puritani at the Théâtre-Italien. In 1842, Donizetti wrote the parts of Norina and Ernesto in Don Pasquale for Grisi and Giovanni Matteo de Candia, usually known by his stage-name of Mario, who was to become the love of her life.

Her voice was described as a dramatic soprano which, during her prime, was praised by music critics for its exceptional beauty, evenness and smoothness. Her career spanned 30 years in total. She was a noted actress, appearing regularly in London with such eminent singers as Luigi Lablache, Giovanni Battista Rubini and Antonio Tamburini, not to mention her husband Mario. Indeed, the prickly press commentator Henry Chorley praised both her and Mario for their success in establishing Italian opera as an important component of the London music scene.

In 1854, after they were married, Giulia and Mario undertook a lucrative tour of the United States of America, where they were treated as major international celebrities.

== Personal life ==
=== First marriage ===
In 1836 Grisi married the French nobleman Count Gérard de Melcy. The marriage was unhappy, but he refused her a divorce. In 1838, her husband discovered a letter written to her by Frederick Stewart, 4th Marquess of Londonderry (then Lord Castlereagh), and the two men fought a duel on 16 June of that year. Lord Castlereagh was wounded in the wrist; the count was uninjured. After the duel, Grisi left her husband and began an affair with Lord Castlereagh, with whom she had a son, George Frederick Ormsby, born in November 1839, in London. Lord Castlereagh had no legitimate children by his wife, so George Frederick was first brought up by his natural father as a guardian or godfather while Grisi continued her singing career. George Frederick was never legally recognized as a Stewart, but his father was able to bestow upon him the Welsh surname Ormsby (meaning "by the willow-tree"). After Grisi and Lord Castlereagh's relationship ended, he continued to support his son by paying for his education at an English boarding school and accompanying him as his uncle to see Grisi whenever she was in London.

=== Second marriage ===
While living with "Mario" Giovanni de Candia before their marriage, Giulia and Mario kept homes in Paris and London. After a tumultuous legal battle, Grisi obtained her divorce, and in 1844 at Hannover Square in London UK, Grisi married "Mario the tenor" (Giovanni Matteo de Candia). From this marriage, the couple adopted her previous son under the styled name Fredo de Candia for nobiliary inheritance purpose for the legal adoption of George-Frederick de Candia Ormsby at the Royal Sardinian Consulate in London, he lived sharing homes between the de Candia's and the Stewart's his natural father. Once married, the couple settled in Fulham, London Borough, and from this union they had a family of six daughters:

  - Giulia de Candia, born in June 1842, died on January 22, 1844, Paris, France.
  - Rita de Candia, born on March 11, 1849, Ashburnham House, Chelsea, London, UK, died in Berlin, Germany, after 1886; she was promised in marriage to the nephew of Sir John Aird Bart.
  - Maria Angelina de Candia, born in Chelsea, London, UK, December 1850, died 24 December 1853, Paris, France.
  - Cecilia Maria de Candia, born December 24, 1853, Brighton, UK, died May 26, 1926, Bordighera, Italy; she married Godfrey Pearse, on 29 February 1872 at St.Pauls, Wilton Grove, London.
  - Clelia de Candia, born in 1855, Fulham, London, UK, death date unknown; she was married to Arthur Powys-Vaughan, in May 1875 at St. George's Hanover Square, London. They issued daughter Ivy Clelia G de Candia Powys-Vaughan (1876-1951), and son "Gwyn" Sir Gwynneth de Candia Powys-Vaughan (ca. 1879 - )
  - Bella Maria de Candia, born 25 December 1857, Fulham, London, UK, died in December 1861 in Brighton.

They frequently returned to Italy, living seasonally at the Villa Salviati in Florence, a property Mario had purchased in 1849. Grisi wrote in her diary of the exciting times spent there with distinguished guests drawn from the world of opera and the aristocracy. But she rather preferred their private family vacations at their cottage in Bordighera, the place where she felt at home.

== Death ==
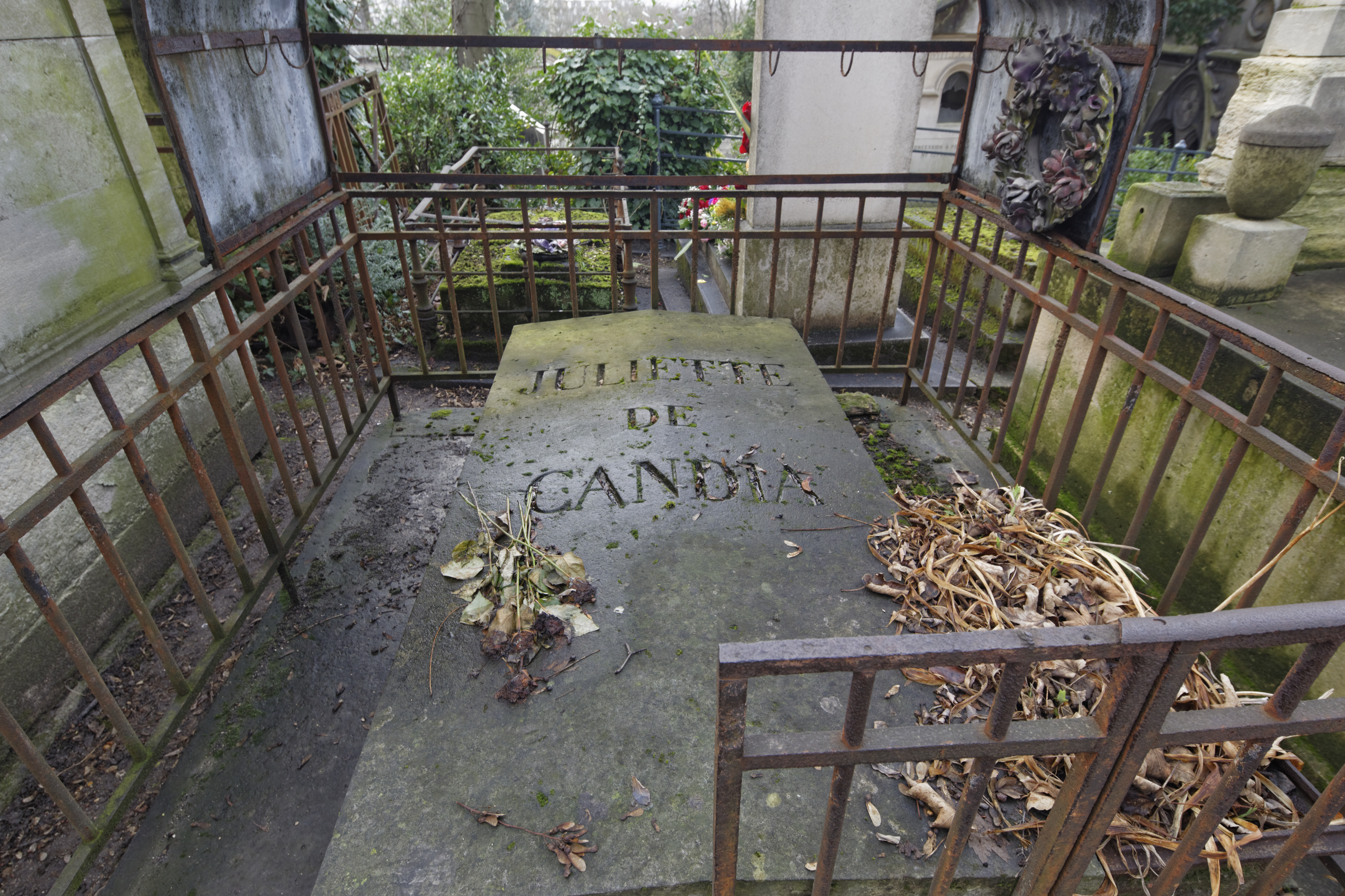
Grave of Giulia Grisi, in Paris, at Père Lachaise Cemetery, France.

During a trip to Saint Petersburg, Russia, while traveling by train with her family, Grisi was involved in an accident after having crossed the border into Germany. She was taken to a hotel in Berlin, where she spent her last days under the care of a Dr. Isabell. She died there on 29 November 1869, aged 58. Her husband took her body to Paris, where she was buried at Père Lachaise Cemetery. Her tomb is marked with a plain white stone with the inscription "Juliette de Candia".

== Legacy ==
Her rich operatic career was documented in contemporary musical records, pictures, and paintings. Upon her death, her husband donated a substantial sum for the creation of sopranos scholarships at the Paris Opera, the theater that first gave fame to Giuglia's voice.
One of her daughters with Mario, Cecilia Maria de Candia, became a recognized writer and married an English gentleman, Godfrey Pearse; her book The Romance of a Great Singer – A Memoir of Mario, which included a great deal about her mother as well, was published in London in 1910.

Grisi was referred to favorably in Gustave Flaubert's Madame Bovary, alongside other notable singers of the time.
