= Listed buildings in Rusthall =

Civil Parish in Kent, England

Rusthall is a village and civil parish in the Borough of Tunbridge Wells of Kent, England. It contains six grade II listed buildings that are recorded in the National Heritage List for England.

This list is based on the information retrieved online from Historic England.

== Key ==
Grade	Criteria
I	Buildings that are of exceptional interest
II*	Particularly important buildings of more than special interest
II	Buildings that are of special interest

== Listing ==
Name	Grade	Location	Type	Completed (Note: The date given is the date used by Historic England as significant for the initial building or that of an important part in the structure's description.)	Date designated	Grid ref. (Note: The grid reference is based on the British national grid reference system, sometimes known as OSGB36, used by the Ordnance Survey.) Geo-coordinates	Notes	Entry number (Note: The "List Entry Number" is a unique number assigned to each listed building and scheduled monument by Historic England.)	Image	Wikidata
1, 3 and 5, 7, Lower Green Road	II	1, 3 and 5, 7, Lower Green Road, Royal Tunbridge Wells			20 May 1952	TQ5624039689; 51°08′07″N 0°13′54″E		1338835	Upload Photo	Q26623126
55-63, Lower Green Road	II	55-63, Lower Green Road, Royal Tunbridge Wells	building		7 June 1974	TQ5621940111; 51°08′20″N 0°13′54″E		1338836	55-63, Lower Green Road More images	Q26623127
Home Farm	II	92, Lower Green Road, Royal Tunbridge Wells			7 June 1974	TQ5626340205; 51°08′23″N 0°13′56″E		1338837	Upload Photo	Q26623128
Rusthall Cottage	II	19, Lower Green Road, Royal Tunbridge Wells			7 June 1974	TQ5626639821; 51°08′11″N 0°13′56″E		1084447	Upload Photo	Q26368125
The Red Lion Public House	II	Lower Green Road, Royal Tunbridge Wells	pub		7 June 1974	TQ5622140139; 51°08′21″N 0°13′54″E		1084448	The Red Lion Public House More images	Q26368127
Drinking Fountain	II	Rusthall Common, Royal Tunbridge Wells	drinking fountain		7 June 1974	TQ5628739604; 51°08′04″N 0°13′57″E		1338858	Drinking Fountain More images	Q26623147

== See also ==
- Grade I listed buildings in Kent
- Grade II* listed buildings in Kent

== Sources ==
- Newman, John (2012) [1969], Kent: West and the Weald, The Buildings of England, New Haven and London: Yale University Press, ISBN 978-0-300-18509-6
