= Mario (tenor) =

Italian opera singer (1810–1883)

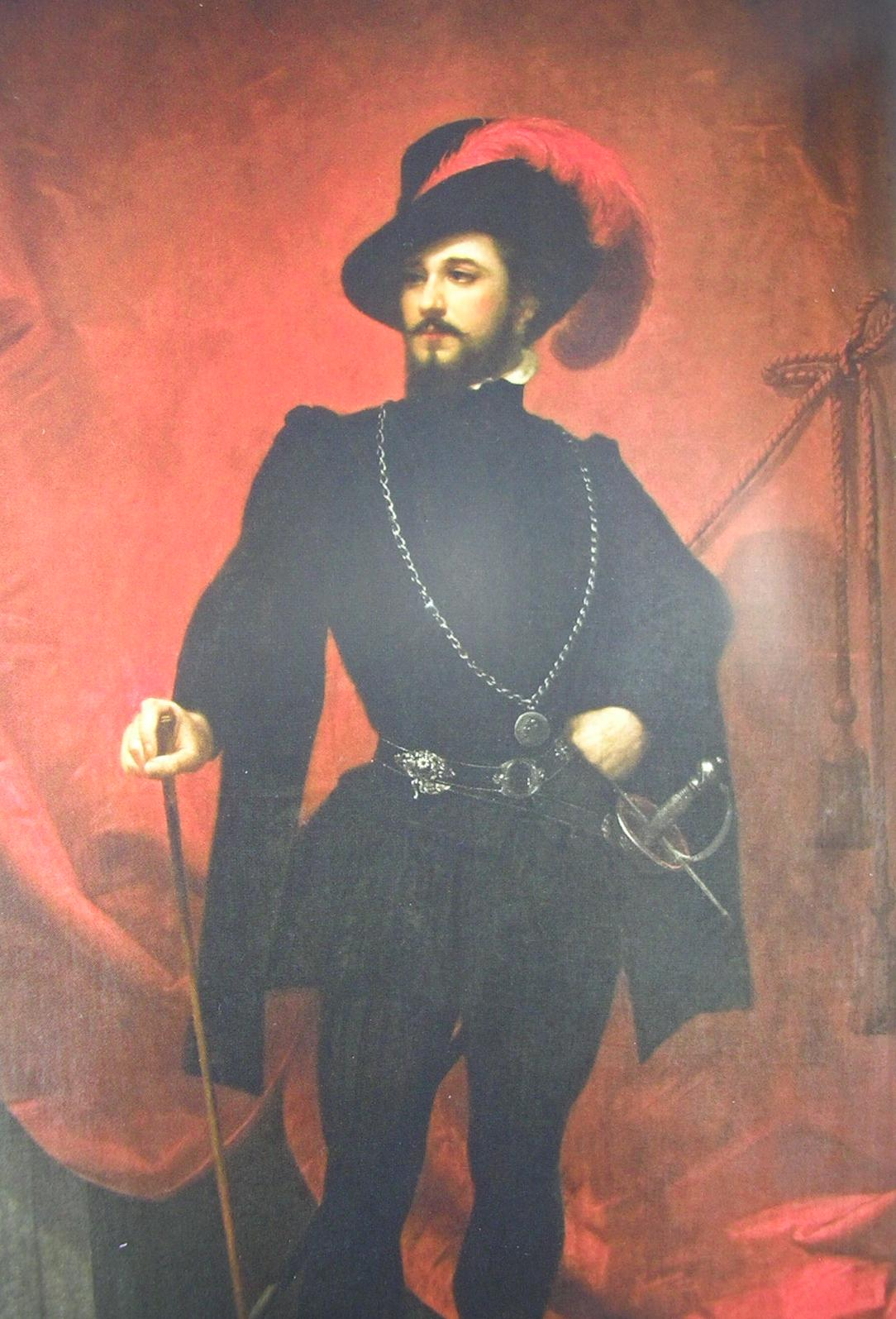
Portrait of Mario as Don Giovanni in the 1850s at the Italian Opera House of the Mariinsky Theatre

Giovanni Matteo de Candia (17 October 1810 – 11 December 1883), known by the pseudonymous mononym Mario, was an Italian opera singer. The most celebrated tenor of his era, he was lionized by audiences in Paris and London. He was the partner and husband of fellow opera singer Giulia Grisi.

== Early life ==
Giovanni Matteo de Candia was born in Cagliari, Sardinia, on 17 October 1810; his inherited titles were Cavaliere (Knight), Nobile (Nobleman) and Don (Sir) in the Kingdom of Sardinia and subsequently the Kingdom of Italy. His family belonged to the Savoyard–Sardinian nobility and aristocracy, within the Kingdom of Sardinia ruled by the House of Savoy. His relatives and parents were members of the Royal Court of Turin, while his father don Stefano, Marquess de Candia, held the ranks of military general, and Royal Governor General of Nice under the Kingdom of Sardinia, and was aide-de-camp to King Charles Felix of Sardinia of the House of Savoy.

In order to free himself from the burdensome ancestral traditions which he had inherited, and to mitigate his father's opposition to a member of the high-born De Candia family pursuing a 'lowly' musical career, the budding singer adopted the mononym Mario as his stage name when he made his debut on 30 November 1838. Sometimes, however, he is referred to in print by the fuller appellation of "Giovanni Mario", and he is also called "Mario de Candia".

Mario's decision to become a professional singer arose accidentally. He was 12 years old when he moved from Cagliari to Turin, where he studied at the Royal Military Academy. Among his fellow students at the academy was the future Prime Minister of Italy, Camillo Cavour. While serving as a second-lieutenant in the King of Sardinia's Royal Guards in Turin, he became interested in politics and held meetings to debate the unification of the Italian Peninsula. He spent his own money to support this unpopular political movement, and he found himself in financial trouble. His father, who opposed his youngest son's political view, refused to support or help Mario. On 24 November 1836, Mario was expelled from the army and escaped by sea with his comrades to the French coast.

== Exiled in Paris ==
After fleeing Piedmont, he landed with his comrades at a fishermen's town on the French coast near Nice. There he stayed for a few weeks at the cottage of an English fisherman named Captain Davis, a friend of Lord Byron's. Then, disguised as a French fisherman, he travelled to San Lorenzo al Mare to meet one of his brothers-in-law, Lieutenant Roych. Roych had arranged for Mario to have a secret meeting with his mother, the Marchioness of Candia. The marchioness provided Mario with gold coins and clothing sufficient for him to escape to the French capital. He intended to return to Turin after a few months to resume his studies at the military academy as his father expected.

Soon after this, the young nobleman travelled as a fugitive disguised as a comedian. In Paris he was hosted at "l'hôtel particulier" of the Prince and Princess of Belgiojoso. Being also Italians in exile, they showed Count Giovanni M. de Candia kindness and hospitality and were instrumental in the launching his singing career. At the princess's parties, Giovanni Mario began to entertain with his singing while meeting many celebrities of the time, among them Lady Blessington, Franz Liszt, Frédéric Chopin, Hector Berlioz, George Sand, Alfred de Musset, Honoré de Balzac, Alessandro Manzoni and Heinrich Heine.

Soon Mario was made welcome in Parisian salons and in the city's radical milieu. He was especially welcomed at the salon events of Princess Cristina Belgiojoso, where he was appreciated as an amateur tenor. For a time he earned his living by giving fencing and horseriding lessons. The Marquess of Brême (who was from a noble Piedmontese family and one of his father's old friends) became one of Mario's most helpful financial supporters. The marquess also served as mentor to Mario while he was making the transition to a musical career.

== Operatic career and liaison with Grisi ==
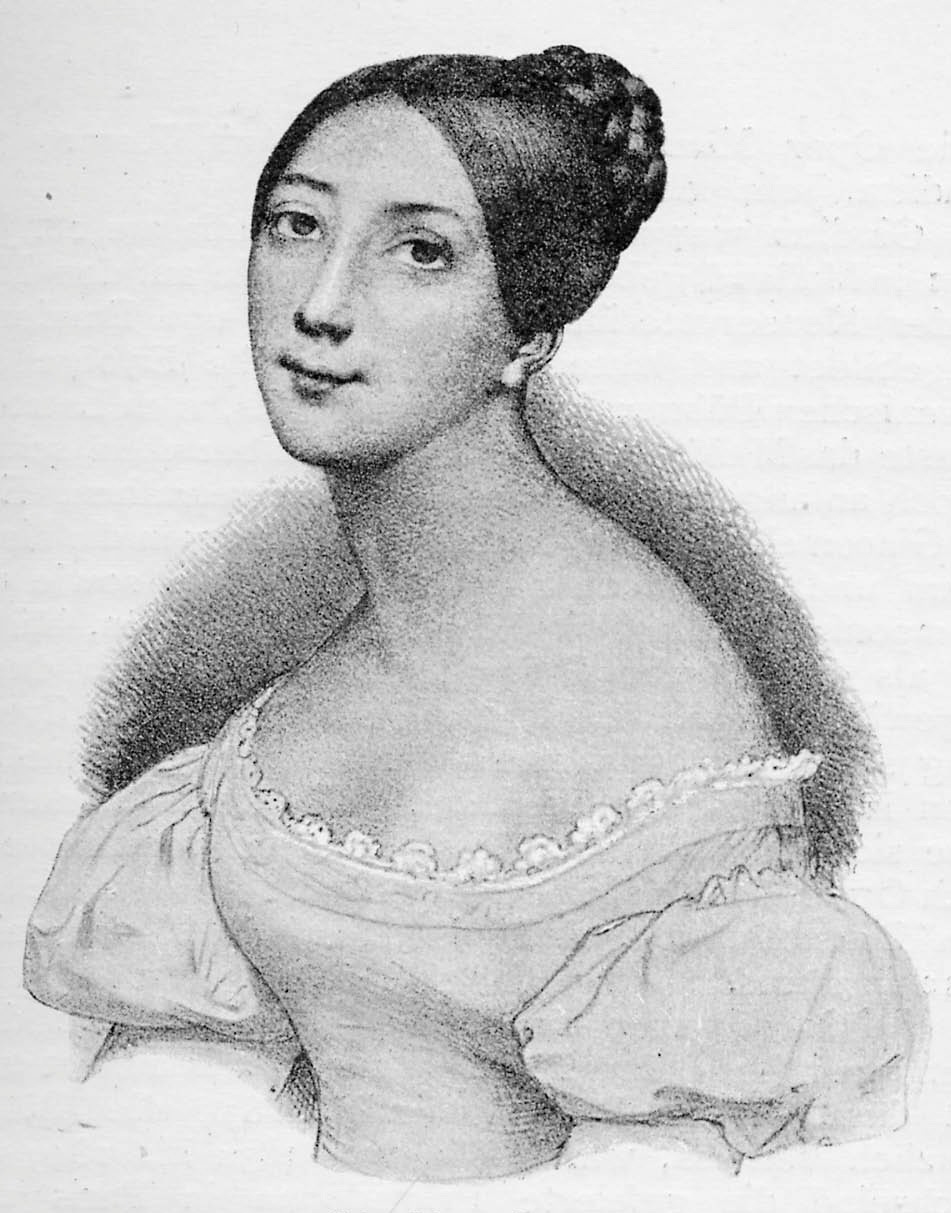
Giulia Grisi

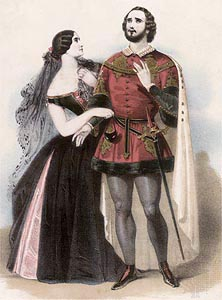
Grisi and Mario in Lucrezia Borgia

While exiled in Paris, Mario became widely known for his exceptionally fine natural voice. The composer Giacomo Meyerbeer encouraged him to become a singer. He took singing lessons from two former tenors, now teachers, Frenchman Antoine Ponchard and Italian Marco Bordogni. Mario proved so gifted that he was swiftly offered an engagement with the Opéra.

At the same time he travelled to London by invitation of the Duke of Wellington, an acquaintance and frequent visitor at Mario's family home in Nice. During that trip, he sang in fashionable quartets at Bridgewater House with the British gentleman B. Mitford, father of Barty Mitford, Lord Redesdale. The young tenor made his opera debut there on 30 November 1838 as the hero of Meyerbeer's Robert le diable. Meyerbeer provided a new recitative and aria for him in the second act (the "Mario-Aria"). Mario's performance generated great excitement, and "a new star was born".

Despite achieving immediate success, he chose not to stay long at the Paris Opéra. With the splendid quality of his singing and his dashing stage presence, he hoped to perform in other places. In 1839 he first sang in London, achieving instant success in Donizetti's Lucrezia Borgia. There he met the famous Italian soprano Giulia Grisi. He then joined the Théâtre Italien, where Grisi and other illustrious singers including Maria Malibran, Henriette Sontag, Fanny Tacchinardi Persiani, Giovanni Battista Rubini, Antonio Tamburini, and Luigi Lablache regularly performed. His first appearance there was as Nemorino in Donizetti's L'elisir d'amore.

From 1841 Mario and Grisi lived together. The acclaim which Mario received in Italian opera surpassed the renown he had won in French opera, and he soon acquired a Europe-wide reputation for the beauty of his singing and the elegance of his bearing. He possessed a handsome face and a lithe figure; he liked to show off his legs in tights. His lyrical voice, though less dazzling than that of the older virtuoso tenor Giovanni Battista Rubini and not as powerful as that of his younger rival Enrico Tamberlik, was described, in its early days, by Théophile Gautier as "fresh, pure, velvety, [and] with an admirable and youthful timbre". The music critic and playwright George Bernard Shaw, who was born in 1856 and therefore could not have heard Mario in his prime, remarked that Mario's singing featured a marked vibrato.

Mario created few operatic parts, the most notable being that of Ernesto in Donizetti's Don Pasquale (1843). However, he sang in the première of Rossini's Stabat Mater, and Verdi wrote a new cabaletta for him to sing in the main tenor aria in I due Foscari for a production in Paris. In established roles, Mario's greatest performances were as the title character in Rossini's Otello, Gennaro in Lucrezia Borgia, Almaviva in Il Barbiere di Siviglia, Fernando in La favorite, the Duke in Rigoletto, Alfredo in La traviata, Manrico in Il trovatore, Lionel in Martha and many others. The Royal Opera House, Covent Garden in London and the Théâtre Italien in Paris were the scenes of most of his stage triumphs. He sang in London from 1847 until 1867, and again during 1871.

Mario also made occasional appearances elsewhere in England in oratorio, for example at the Birmingham Festival of 1849 and at the Hereford Festival of 1855. He also undertook a string of concert tours around the United Kingdom. In about the year 1849, he acquired the "Villa Salviati" in Florence. At his salon, he received many distinguished cultural figures and members of the European nobility.

In 1854, he toured America with Giulia Grisi, earning both money and adulation during their trans-Atlantic jaunt. Mario could not marry Grisi because she was already married to Gérard de Melcy. Although Grisi and de Melcy were separated, divorce was not permitted by the Catholic Church in Italy nor in France. Eventually she married Mario in London, England. Before meeting Mario, Grisi had had a son by Lord Frederick Stewart, a nephew of the famous Robert Stewart, Viscount Castlereagh. The child was acknowledged by Castlereagh with the name Frederick Ormsby. He was later recognized as an adoptive son through his mother's marriage to Mario; he was known as Frederick Ormsby de Candia, socially styled as Fredo de Candia.

Mario and Grisi had six daughters (three died as children):

- Rita de Candia, the eldest surviving daughter, never married and became a reporter;
- Cecilia Maria de Candia, married Godfrey Pearse, an Englishman, and became a writer, recounting her parents' careers in one of her books, The Romance of a Great Singer;
- Clelia de Candia, married Arthur Powys-Vaughan, a Welshman, and became a watercolour artist.

In 1869, Mario and Grisi were traveling from Paris to Saint Petersburg, for Mario to perform at the Italian Opera House at the Mariinsky Theater. Grisi died during their mid-trip stop in Berlin, but Mario went on to sing for the Tsar at the St. Petersburg theatre. Following their mother's death, his daughters were put under the care of tutors appointed by their godmother, the Grand Duchess Maria of Russia and president of the Imperial Academy of Arts in St. Petersburg.

Mario bade farewell to the stage at Covent Garden in 1871, but his last performances were concerts in a US tour with Carlotta Patti in 1872–73.

== Retirement, death and legacy ==
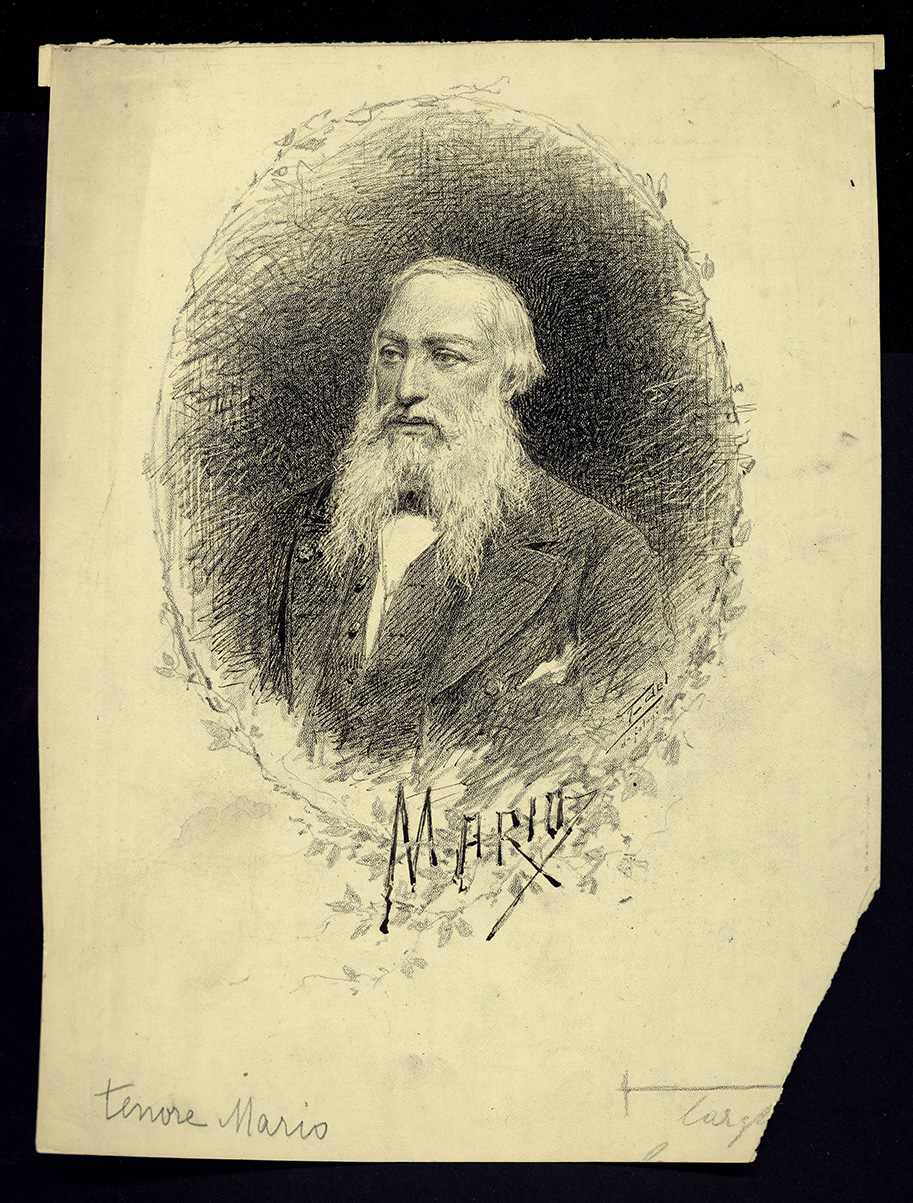
A late portrait of Mario de Candia

He spent his last years in Rome, where he was a friend of Prince Odescalchi. Financial difficulties beset him at times, due to his habitual extravagance. It is said that he used to smoke cigars habitually, even when taking a bath. He continued to entertain the rich and famous at social gatherings. He was a frequent guest at the Quirinal Palace where he could be found casually singing with Queen Margherita of Italy, herself an artist and a great lover of music. After Mario's death, his legacy was kept alive by a fund for opera singing education in his honor and name.

A benefit concert was staged for Mario in London in 1878, and collections reached £4,000, which provided a pension for the singer. He died in Rome in 1883 and was buried in his home town, Cagliari, in 1884.

== His fortune and the De Candia ancestral seat ==
During his singing career, Mario and Grisi both accumulated a significant fortune, particularly at their assignments at the Mariinsky Theatre where the Tsar used to pay them in gold coins. During their extensive tours in France and England they were paid handsomely in the currency of the time. They had also accumulated a great deal of jewelry—diamonds and other precious stones—as gifts from admiring kings and queens of Europe. Their joint fortune was estimated to be over 600 gold-bars, equivalent to 12 million US dollars in today's currency. They owned a home near L'Opéra in Paris, a mansion in Fulham, London, and the Villa Salviatino near Florence, as well as a cottage for Mario's mother in Cagliari. Mario's finances were entrusted to the Rothschild & Cie Banque in Paris, France, and eventually transferred to N M Rothschild & Sons in London, England.

Unfortunately, by the end of his life, he had spent most of the funds in his daughters' dowries, and he had used the remaining funds to partially self-finance his last tour of the Americas. Nevertheless, he maintained a large art collection that he had accumulated together with Grisi. He put these works up in an estate sale in London before he relocated to Italy. Most of his art collection and the other contents of the estate sale were acquired by the British family of the fiancé of his daughter Rita following her death. Most of the paintings he acquired with Grisi remain in the private collection of Sir John Aird, Bart.

In 1847 Mario bought a house in Sardinia, where his mother lived with his brother Carlo until he got married. The property is situated in Cagliari Old Town (Castello), in Contrada S. Caterina 1 (now via Canelles). After his death, the house passed down to his daughters. This house is now a part of a nuns' convent.

The main family house, called Palazzo de Candia, is nearby. It had been owned by his father don Stephano, Marquis of Candia. According to the rules of Sardinian nobility, the highest rank (nobiliary title) and main residence pass to the oldest male in line; thus, the Palazzo de Candia passed on to Mario's older brother. Eventually, that property became the home of his brother Carlo and family.

It is located at the bottom of Via dei Genovesi, where until the 16th century the Pisan town walls stood, between the Elephant and the Lion Towers. The façade was designed in the neoclassical style, possibly by the architect Gaetano Cima, or possibly by Mario's brother Carlo himself. Carlo had studied architecture in Turin together with Cima. On the first floor, there are halls with some frescoes and a terrace with scenic views of the gulf of Cagliari.
