= Arthur Powys-Vaughan =

English soldier and Inspector of Factories

Arthur Powys-Vaughan (1 November 1847 – February 1916) was an English soldier and Inspector of Factories.

== Early life ==
He was born in Brighton, Sussex on 1 November 1847. He was the eldest son of the Rev. James Vaughan (c. 1806–c. 1889) and Emily (née Powys) Vaughan, who married in 1843. His maternal grandparents were Penelope (née Hatsell) Powys (a daughter of James Hatsell, Esq. of Morden Park, Surrey, and niece of John Hatsell, Clerk of the House of Commons) and the Hon. Rev. Littleton Powys (the second surviving son of Thomas Powys, 1st Baron Lilford and younger brother to Thomas Powys, 2nd Baron Lilford).

Powys-Vaughan was educated at Balliol College, Oxford where he matriculated in 1866.

== Career ==
Powys-Vaughan was a lieutenant in the King's Royal Rifle Corps by The Duke of Cambridge, and in 1880 he was appointed to be one of H.M. Inspector of Factories, in the Home Office, by Sir William Harcourt, the Home Secretary.

== Personal life ==
On 25 May 1875, Powys-Vaughan was married to countess Clelia Maria Corinna de Candia (b. 1855) at St Peter's Church, Eaton Square. She was the second daughter of the famous count Mario the Tenor and Giulia Grisi. Together, they were the parents of:

- Ivy Clelia de Candia Powys-Vaughan (1876–1951), who married Bernard Edward Halsey Bircham, the private solicitor to George V from 1922 to 1936.
- Gwynneth "Gwyn" de Candia Powys-Vaughan (1879–1922), after travelling the world with his cousin the botanist David Thomas Gwynne-Vaughan, he returned to England and became a Royal Officer.

Powys-Vaughan died in February 1916 in the Marylebone district, Middlesex.
