= Bernard Halsey-Bircham =

English lawyer

Sir Bernard Edward Halsey-Bircham, GCVO, JP (born Halsey; 1869–1945) was an English lawyer and the private solicitor to King George V from 1922 to 1936.

== Early life ==
Born on 1 January 1869, he was the younger son of Edward Joseph Halsey, of Henley Park in Surrey, and his wife Katharine, daughter of F. T. Bircham, of Burhill. He attended Eton College and was admitted a solicitor in 1891. In 1895, he changed his surname to Halsey-Bircham.

== Career and later life ==
Eventually, Halsey-Bircham became senior partner in the law firm of Bircham and Co., which practised in parliamentary and commercial law. During the First World War, he was a legal adviser to the Ministry of Food. In 1922, he was appointed private solicitor to King George V. He was appointed a Knight Commander of the Royal Victorian Order (KCVO) in the 1925 Birthday Honours, and promoted to Knight Grand Cross after the King's death, in the 1936 Birthday Honours.

Halsey-Bircham had also been involved in local affairs. He was a magistrate in Surrey and chaired the county council. He died on 11 July 1945; by his wife Ivy Clelia, née Vaughan (a daughter of Arthur Powys-Vaughan), he left a son. Two photographic portraits of Halsey-Bircham are housed in the National Portrait Gallery, London.
