= Ugo Ojetti =

Italian journalist, commentator and writer

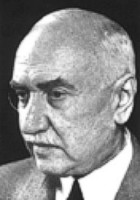
- Born: 15 June 1871; Rome, Italy
- Died: 1 January 1946 (aged 74); Fiesole, Tuscany, Italy
- Education: Rome
- Occupations: Journalist-Commentator; Author; Magazine founder / editor
- Spouse: Fernanda Gobba
- Children: Paola Ojetti (1908–1978)
- Parents: Raffaello Ojetti (1845–1924) (father); Veronica Carosi (mother)

Ugo Ojetti (15 July 1871 – 1 January 1946) was an Italian journalist-commentator and author. He wrote prolifically on a wide range of topics. His output also includes short stories and at least seven novels. Nevertheless, during his later decades he increasingly focused on arts criticism, and it is as an art critic that he is most frequently identified in the more generalist sources. Widely admired for his mastery of language, and especially of Italian, he is also commended by admirers as an exceptionally effective aphorist.

Some of Ojetti’s output was published pseudonymously. His most frequently employed pseudonym, notably during the first decade of the twentieth century, was “Conte Ottavio” ("Count Octavian").

== Biography ==
=== Provenance and early years ===
Ugo Ojetti was born in Rome. Raffaello Ojetti (1845–1924), his father, was an architect and in political terms a man of liberal instincts, with an exceptionally broad cultural hinterland. Raffaello Ojetti also contributed commentaries and criticism on architecture and other arts based topics. Ugo Ojetti's mother, born Veronica Carosi, came originally from Spoleto, and probably died while he was still a teenager. He attended the venerable "Collegio Sant'Ignazio" in Rome and then moved on to the city’s "Sapienza University" from where, in 1892, he emerged with a degree in Jurisprudence. In addition to his Italian language skills, he had by this time mastered English and French, intending initially to become a diplomat. He already faced competing career options, however, and instead launched himself as a political journalist-commentator. In 1894 he linked up with "La Tribuna", a daily newspaper based in Rome, and generally seen as a publication reflecting traditionalist liberalism of the centre-left. It was for "La Tribuna" that Ojetti provided his first regular journalistic contributions, notably from Egypt where he undertook a lengthy reporting assignment to the Luxor excavations. Another newspaper for which he wrote during this early part of his career was the "Nuova Rassegna".

=== The first book ===
Ojetti's first book was published in 1895 and reprinted in 1898. It brought his written work to the attention of a wider readership. “Alla scoperta dei letterati ...” (Note: “Alla scoperta dei letterati: Colloquii con Carducci, Panzacchi, Fogazzaro, Lioy, Verga, Praga, De Roberto, Cantù, Butti, De Amicis, Pascoli, Marradi, Antona-Traversi, Martini, Capuana, Pascarella, Bonghi, Graf, Scarfoglio, Serao, Colautti, Bracco, Gallina, Giacosa, Oliva, D’Annunzio” / “Discovering the literati: Conversations with ….”) consists of a series of biographical essays set out as though they were interviews. The approach was not one with which readers, at that time, would have been particularly familiar. The style sits somewhere between well considered literary criticism and reportage. The volume confronts later generations with an opportunity to analyse in some depth the rapidly evolving literary trends of its time. In 1896 Ojetti progressed matters by organising a conference at Venice under the arresting title, “L'avvenire della letteratura in Italia” ("The Future of Literature in Italy"). He himself took the opportunity to present a youthfully idealistic vision of an internationalist literary spirit, unencumbered by the cultural patriotism of Mazzini or Garibaldi and the Risorgimento which, nearly half a century after unification, still provided a rich context for much contemporary thought and writing in Italy at the end of the nineteenth century. The conference, and Ojetti’s ideas presented at it, triggered much comment and not a little discussion among the intellectual classes in Italy.

=== Journalist-commentator ===
During the final five years of the nineteenth century Ojetti’s articles became widely available and widely read. Between 1896 and 1899 he was writing for Il Marzocco, a new weekly magazine produced in Italy’s former capital, Florence and covering literature and the arts, but also developments in sociology and politics. His contributions were also appearing in “Il Giornale di Roma”, the literary-political Sunday paper “Fanfulla della Domenica” and La Stampa, a daily newspaper produced in Turin, another of the country’s former capitals. Almost certainly his most important newspaper collaboration, which began in 1898, was that with the Milan based Corriere della Sera, a nationally distributed daily newspaper for which Ojetti would continue to write for the rest of his life, serving for 20 months as managing director of the influential publication during 1926/27.

During the early years of the twentieth century Ojetti was based abroad for much of the time. In 1901 and again in 1902 he reported from Paris for the pioneering Rome-based "Giornale d'Italia" (daily newspaper). Between 1900 and 1905 he was based for approximately six months in every twelve in Paris or London. Between 1904 and 1909 he worked with the weekly illustrated news magazine L'Illustrazione Italiana, taking on a regular column identified by the title “Accanto alla vita” (‘’loosely, “Alongside life”’’). The columns were attributed to an ill-disguised fictional contributor called the “Conte Ottavio”, and Ojetti was able to raise the profile of the column with readers, eventually changing its name to “I capricci del conte Ottavio” ("The Caprices of Count Ottavio"). He also wrote a couple of stage plays, but these failed to resonate with theatre audiences.

=== Family and Florence ===
On 25 October 1905 Ugo Ojetti became engaged to Fernanda Gobba. Fernanda was a niece to the wealthy Umbrian “self-made” industrialist-politician Ferdinando Cesaroni. They married shortly afterwards and moved to Florence. Fernanda came originally from Piedmont, but the couple would, for the rest of their lives, live in or close to Florence. Ojetti would go on to describe himself as Roman by birth and by cultural inheritance, but Florentine by choice. A prominent figure in the city, Ojetti quickly became part of the Florentine intellectual elite, which for reasons of history and habit, was in some ways more internationalist and liberal in outlook than equivalent social networks in Rome or Milan. The decision to move away from Rome, and to not move to the northern media capital of Milan, was an astute one which, helped by his ever more restricted professional focus on the arts, a dimension of human existence in which Mussolini had vanishingly little interest, permitted Ojetti to live out the later decades of his professional life with an element of intellectual and social freedom which would never have been available surrounded by the political hot-house that was Rome. A few years following their marriage (though sources differ significantly as to precisely when) the couple’s only recorded child, Paola Ojetti was born. She would later follow her father into journalism and other literary pursuits. It is not entirely clear whether it was in 1911 or 1914 Ojetti felt able to settle in a more permanent residence, setting up home at the Villa Salviatino, one of the finest country villas in the area, positioned on a hillside directly to the south of Fiesole and enjoying a fine view across over Florence. (Note: Today the former Ojetti family home has been repurposed as a “boutique hotel” by a subsequent owner.)

=== War ===
North of the Alps war broke out at the end of July 1914 and less than a year later the government in Rome was persuaded that Italy should join in. The country fought alongside France and England, which meant defiance of treaty obligation dating back to 1882. Nevertheless, for many of those impatient for Italy to win its share of the glory there was much to be celebrated in finding Italians fighting once more against the old northern enemy, Austria, which still featured prominently in popular consciousness as the former colonial power. Ojetti had used the columns of Corriere della Sera during 1914 to campaign for Italian military intervention in a column headed “Esami di coscienza” (loosely, “Examining one’s conscience”). He had denounced German bombing of Reims and indeed teamed up with Gabriele D'Annunzio during the early months of 1915 to visit Reims and inspect the situation by the battlefields for himself. A powerful anti-German speech that he delivered in Florence on 29 November 1914 was published shortly afterwards as a booklet. As soon as Italy became militarily engaged he enlisted for military service, appointed a second lieutenant-engineer in May 1915. Other journalists who enlisted in the Italian army undertook parallel careers as war correspondents, sending reports to the newspapers in the major cities, but Ojetti was destined for a more unusual wartime career, and his journalistic contributions between 1915 and 1918 are restricted to a few stridently forgettable patriotic pieces which became more numerous after his transfer to propaganda work in March 1918. His first assignment following enlistment in 1915 involved providing protection for the many art works and monuments in the city of Venice from Austrian bombing. The Austrians had an air base along the coast at Pula from which 42 air raids reached central Venice during the course of the war. Although the extent of the damage was minor by the standards of later wars, Venice was not unscathed by the bombing. Major art works were evacuated to locations in the surrounding flatlands which were considered less perilous (and less readily identifiable from the air) than Venice itself. Although the extent of the exercise and of Ojetti’s responsibility over it is not entirely clear, it does appear that annihilation of Venice’s rich artistic heritage by Austrian air raids was avoided. Another unusual commission came in March 1918, when Ojetti was appointed “Royal Commissioner for Propaganda over the enemy”. His best remembered task in this role was to compose a short bilingual manifesto addressed to the citizens of Vienna. 350,000 copies were printed on a colourful two sided sheet against a tricolour backdrop of the Italian flag, and they were “distributed”, in the space of five minutes during the morning of 9 August 1918 from the skies over Vienna, by a squadron of nine planes commanded from his own cockpit by Gabriele D'Annunzio. Commentators differed then and subsequently as to the military relevance of the exercise, but it clearly pointed the way ahead in pioneering a new device whereby wars might be conducted using the latest technology during the century ahead.

=== “Dedalo” and other arts magazines ===
After the fighting on the Austrian front ended in November 1918 there remained work to be done in respect of artworks to be returned to Venice once it was deemed safe for this to be done. In the event, the proximity of Austrian armies was greatly reduced by frontier changes both to the north and to the east, but the frontier changes involved were not incorporated into an internationally agreed (some would have said imposed) treaty till September 1919. Nevertheless, by 1920 Ojetti was able to focus again in his work as a commentator-journalist concentrating primarily on the arts. In addition to continuing with his work for Corriere della Sera he now also founded his own publication, “Dedalo”, an ambitiously conceived monthly magazine of arts reviews and criticism published by the wealthy artist-publisher Emilio Bestetti who entrusted editorial management and day-to-day directorial responsibilities for the journal to Ojetti. The magazine was produced till 1931 at Bestetti’s specialist publishing house in Milan and then transferred to Rome. “Dedalo” was launched in June 1920: publication ceased in 1933. It quickly gained a following through Ojetti’s determination to appeal to the widest possible readership by insisting on concise readable prose and focusing on the widest possible panorama of subjects in respect of Italian arts criticism rather than excessive preoccupation with specialist sub-topics. He was able to follow through on his ambitions for the magazine, not leastly, because he wrote much of it himself. “Dedalo”, found a ready supply of enthusiastic contributors from among Italy’s leading young artists and intellectuals of the time: these included commentators like Matteo Marangoni from Florence, the Senese Bianchi Bandinelli and Piero Jahier, along with art historian-scholars such as Bernard Berenson and Pietro Toesca. Others among the better known contributors were Antonio Maraini, Lionello Venturi and Roberto Longhi. The number and diversity of the distinguished contributors reflected Ojetti’s underlying conviction that the value of art is enhanced by the way in which it offers visible testimony to history and of civilization more effectively than any other body of sources. In 1921 Ojetti also launched his regular “Tantalo" column in Corriere della Sera which echoed many of the characteristics and priorities of “Dedalo”. In 1933 he retired from many of his journalistic commitments, but he would continue to contribute the ”Tantalo” column till 1939. Sketches, impressions and portraits from “Tantalo” were later gathered together and published in seven volumes by Treves.

In 1929 Ojetti launched another review magazine, this time produced closer to home, in Florence. “Pègaso” tended, from the outset, to concentrate on modern and contemporary literature, though there was a consistent rejection of the experimental and avant-garde, which appears to have reflected Ojetti’s own preferences, though it was also conveniently closely aligned to what could already be gleaned of the literary instincts of Italy’s rulers. Publication ended in 1933, though the title would be revived in the 1970s.

In 1933 he launched ”Pan”, a new literary review magazine which in many respects replaced Pègaso. “Pan” was produced in Milan, however, and featured a far wider remit. It covered not just literature, but also arts and music, along with an increased attention to history and the figurative arts. Most importantly, during a decade in which government was becoming increasingly hands-on in respect of the media, it followed fascist precepts in ways which, for later post-fascist commentators, risk being interpreted as parody. The aspiration to national greatness and a new order were to the fore, along with backing for myths illustrating the superiority of Latin-Mediterranean civilisations and the intrinsic universality of fascism. Much of the editorial management and writing was entrusted to Giuseppe De Robertis from the south and Guido Piovene from the north. Ojetti was formally in charge, but he was less central to editorial governance of ”Pan” than he had been at “Pègaso”. His contributions nevertheless appeared prominently in it. His rejection of the idealistic liberalism characteristic of nineteenth century risorgimento and his endorsement of the fascist vision of “Humanitas” were, for instance, on full display in a feature he contributed to the January 1934 edition under the heading “Avvertenza al lettore” (‘’”Warning to the reader”’’). After two years ”Pan” ceased publication in December 1935.

=== Ojetti and fascism ===
Several commentators have suggested that there remains a gap in the market for a more detailed study of the relationship between Ugo Ojetti and fascism. After July 1943 a new literary class emerged comprising returned exiles from fascism and including, among its younger members, former partisan fighters against the Mussolini government and the German armies in Italy. In the immediate aftermath of the Mussolini years and the unpopular concurrent war with which they had come to be identified, Ojetti was representative of a period from which newly mainstream intellectuals were keen to move on. In 1925 Ojetti was one of those who added his signature to Giovanni Gentile’s so-called Manifesto of the Fascist Intellectuals, indicating a wish to remain a member of Italy’s literary establishment under the new regime. Nomination in 1930 to the recently created Royal Academy indicated full acceptance by the post-1922 ruling establishment.

Between 1925 and 1933 Ojetti served as a member of the Executive Board for the newly inaugurated Enciclopedia Italiana, of which the initial tranche of volumes was published progressively between 1929 and 1936, taking a vital role till 1929 as coordinator of the compendium’s arts section. Through this period he was, in addition, organising numerous art exhibitions as well as injecting his own magic into various publishing initiatives such as, notably, the series “Le più belle pagine degli scrittori italiani scelte da scrittori viventi” (‘’loosely, “The finest pages from Italian writers, selected by living writers”’’), published by Treves, and the Classici Rizzoli series of “Italian classics”.

=== Cinema ===
Towards the end of his career Ojetti, who celebrated his seventieth birthday in 1941, became peripherally involved in the world of cinema. In 1939 he signed off on the adapted script for the first sound film version of the 1827 Manzoni historical novel The Betrothed, directed by Mario Camerini. His first draft was nevertheless reworked, because it was deemed “too literary” by the film director.

=== Repubblica di Salò ===
After the fall of fascism in Italy in 1943, and the creation of the Nazis' puppet state known in English language sources as the Italian Social Republic (Repubblica di Salò) was proclaimed, Ojetti was one of a number of establishment intellectuals to back the Social Republic. His reputation was much damaged by this. For younger admirers drawn to his writing, Ojetti’s adherence to the derided Repubblica di Salò, was barely fathomable. Someone who tried to explain was the respected journalist-historian Indro Montanelli:

“He was an academician, but he would have been that under any government of whatever character that had chosen to set up a Royal Academy. He was accused of having joined the ‘Repubblica di Salò’, but those accusers forget – or choose to forget – that in 1943 Ojetti was a poor old man afflicted by Alzheimer’s, trapped in his wheel chair, and completely under the control of an overbearing and very fascist wife who [according to subsequent disclosures from researchers and family members] had subsequently gone through Ojetti’s personal notebooks and carefully purged everything that amounted to even the slightest hint of criticism in respect of the Mussolini régime”.

After the liberation of Rome in June 1944 Ojetti was excluded from the “Ordine dei giornalisti”, though it appears that by this time he had not been able to work as a journalist, even for the Corriere della Sera, for at least a year. During his final couple of years, Ojetti withdrew to his home on the edge of Fiesole: it was here that at the start of 1946 he died.
