= Rusthall =

Coordinates: 51.1333°N 0.2354°E

Rusthall and Denny Bottom
- Location within Kent
- Population: 10,460 (2016)
- OS grid reference: TQ565395
- District: Tunbridge Wells
- Shire county: Kent
- Region: South East
- Country: England
- Sovereign state: United Kingdom
- Post town: Tunbridge Wells
- Postcode district: TN4
- Dialling code: 01892
- Police: Kent
- Fire: Kent
- Ambulance: South East Coast
- UK Parliament: Tunbridge Wells

Rusthall is a village located approximately 2 miles to the west of the spa town of Tunbridge Wells in Kent. The village grew up around a large property called "Rusthall" located on Rusthall Common.

Rusthall is a modern village, the majority built after the trains arrived in Royal Tunbridge Wells during the mid-1800s. It was created as a tourist spot, with visitors coming up from the station in charabancs to see the 'Toad Rock', a natural rock formation which looks like a sitting toad, resting on an outcrop of sandstone. Other outcrops can be seen throughout Rusthall Common.

Rusthall F.C.is the local football club in the southern county's East league premier Division as of the 2026/2027 season. After losing to Punjab United in the playoff finals

== History ==
The first known mention of Rusthall and Speldhurst is in a grant of lands by Ecgberht II, an Anglo-Saxon or Jutish king of Kent, to Diora, Bishop of Rochester in the 8th century.

During the 17th century, lodging houses appeared in Rusthall to accommodate visitors to the newly discovered chalybeate spring at The Pantiles, Tunbridge Wells. During the reign of King Charles I, Rusthall tended to attract visitors from the Puritan faction, whilst the Cavalier faction tended to stay at nearby Southborough.

The name "Rusthall" is from the Anglo-Saxon Ruste uuelle, meaning the well contains a high level of natural iron like the chalybeate springs in Tunbridge Wells.

Following the end of the English Civil War, a time during which the Puritans took a hostile attitude to most forms of amusement, the waters at Tunbridge Wells became popular once more, and further accommodation houses were provided in Rusthall.

The village also gained an assembly room and bowling green, to provide amusement for visitors, making it a more popular destination than Southborough, which could only offer a bowling green and coffee house.

During the 18th century, Rusthall fell out of favour, following the emergence of Tunbridge Wells town, which could now offer ample accommodation closer to the waters. Following this shift in popularity, some Rusthall houses, which had been built on moveable sledges, were wheeled to be relocated to the more fashionable Mount Sion area of Tunbridge Wells.

Jeremy Menuhin, son of Yehudi Menuhin, was the previous Lord of the manor of Rusthall. In early 2008 this title, along with the common land and the Pantiles in Tunbridge Wells was purchased by TargetFollow, a property development company based in Norwich.

=== Cold water baths ===
Rusthall, which derived its name from the rusty nature of the local water, also had its own wells known locally for their curative powers. A cold water bath house used to be situated on the south side of Rusthall Common, in the grounds of what is now the Beacon Hotel.

The bath waters were known for their coldness and the clearness of the water which were observed to be "as excellent as any in the kingdom".

The baths were designed as a place of entertainment, the grounds being embellished with fountains and ornaments. Despite these attractions, the baths waned in popularity by the end of the 18th century and fell into a state of decay. The foundations of the cold bath house are still present today.

== Government ==
Rusthall originally formed part of Speldhurst civil parish (together with Ashurst, Groombridge, Langton and Speldhurst) when it was formed in 1894.

Four years later, Tunbridge Wells Borough Council took control over Rusthall, apparently against the parish council's wishes, and the village formed part of the unparished Tunbridge Wells urban area between 1898 and 2011.

On 23 February 2011, Tunbridge Wells Borough Council agreed that Rusthall should become a civil parish and have its own parish council. The first Rusthall Parish Council election took place on 5 May 2011.

Having chaired the Rusthall Village Association for a number of years, Cllr. Jenny Blackburn was elected as chair of Rusthall Parish Council on 18 May 2011.

The three current Tunbridge Wells Borough Councillors representing Rusthall ward are Councillor Jayne Sharratt (Lab), Borough Councillor Alex Britcher-Allan (Lab) and Borough Councillor Matthew Sankey (TW Alliance).

The local Member of Parliament for the Tunbridge Wells constituency is Mike Martin MP (Lib Dem).

=== Demographics ===
At the 2011 UK census, the Rusthall electoral ward had a population of 4,976 in 2,076 households.

== Geography ==
Rusthall is located just under 2 miles (3.2 km) west of Tunbridge Wells town centre, and is separated from the built-up area of Tunbridge Wells by Rusthall Common and the Tunbridge Wells Golf Club.

The village is around 30 miles (48 km) south-east of London.

=== Toad Rock ===
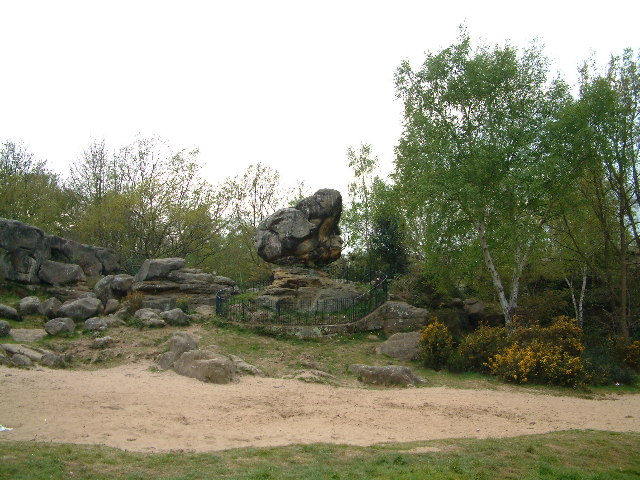
Toad Rock, Rusthall

Rusthall and the surrounding area features several sandstone outcrops.

One of these formations, located in the Denny Bottom area, close to Rusthall Common, is known as Toad Rock because it resembles a sitting toad.

The first known record of the rock's name is in an 1823 guide by J. Clifford, although the rock itself was first popularised in a local guide published in 1810. The fencing around the rock's base was first installed in 1881–2 and has since been renovated in 1993–94.

The rock formation is not man-made, as was at first suspected, but was eroded into its current shape by wind action during the Ice Age. The area has been designated as a Site of Special Scientific Interest.

Rusthall Common forms an element in the 'green link' under the Tunbridge Wells Borough Council Green Infrastructure Plan, 2011 that provides a wildlife corridor linking the park to the Common, Great Culverden Park and other local wildlife sites.

== Culture and community ==
=== Culture ===
The village fete returned in 2010, for the first time since 1977. It is held on the playing fields at Southwood Road and features a variety of stalls and events.

Every October, the village hosts a torchlit procession, bonfire and fireworks night. The bonfire is built up throughout the day by villagers.

=== High Street, restaurants and pubs ===
Rusthall has a thriving High Street featuring an unusually wide variety of services for a village of its size.

These include two convenience stores, post office, butcher, baker, hardware shop, dry cleaner, therapy clinic/health food shop, hair salon, launderette, pharmacy, beauty salon, barber, audio-visual shop, charity shop, bookmaker and, last but by no means least, estate agent.

Restaurant and take-away options include Chinese, fish and chips, bistro style cafés and pizza, as well as a traditional "greasy spoon" café.

Pubs in the village include the historic Red Lion (first licensed in 1415), The Oak, Toad Rock Retreat and The Beacon, renowned for its captivating views of the High Weald. There is also The Rusthall Social Club.

=== School, healthcare and churches ===
Rusthall St Paul's CE Primary School is located on the High Street.

Rusthall Medical Centre is nearby, on Nellington Road.

Rusthall Dental Practice is on Meadow Road.

St. Paul's Church, built in 1849, is on Rusthall Road, just off the Tunbridge Wells-Langton Green road (A264).

Rusthall United Reformed Church is on Manor Road, off the High Street.

The former Rusthall Evangelical Church is on Westwood Road. The building was opened in 1913.

=== Sport and recreation ===
Rusthall Football Club, founded in 1899, plays in the Southern Counties East Football League (Step 5 of the FA Non-League Pyramid/Level 9). The club was granted senior status in April 2012.

Rusthall Cricket Club has been playing cricket on Rusthall Common since the mid-19th century. The club runs a Saturday side playing friendlies.

Rusthall Common separates the village from the main built up area of neighbouring Tunbridge Wells and is characterised by sandstone outcrops, with names such as Toad Rock, the Elephant, the Lion, Loaf Rock and The Parson's Nose.

Southwood Road Recreation Ground features an adventure playground, a BMX track, mini-skate park, two full-sized football pitches and one mini football pitch. Southwood Road allotments are located next to the recreation ground.

A smaller playground, Mary Caley Recreation Ground, can be found on Ashley Gardens road.

Rusthall Amateur Boxing Club. A small hut next to the Rusthall library is home to Rusthall & Tunbridge Wells ABC

== Transport ==
Rusthall is connected to Tunbridge Wells and High Brooms by the frequent 281 bus service operated by Arriva Southern Counties. There is no railway line serving Rusthall, although the 281 bus service links the village to Tunbridge Wells main-line station for direct services to London, Tonbridge and Hastings.

== See also ==
- Listed buildings in Rusthall
