= Villa Salviatino, Maiano =

Building in Fiesole, Italy

Coordinates: 43°47′25.15″N 11°17′56.20″E

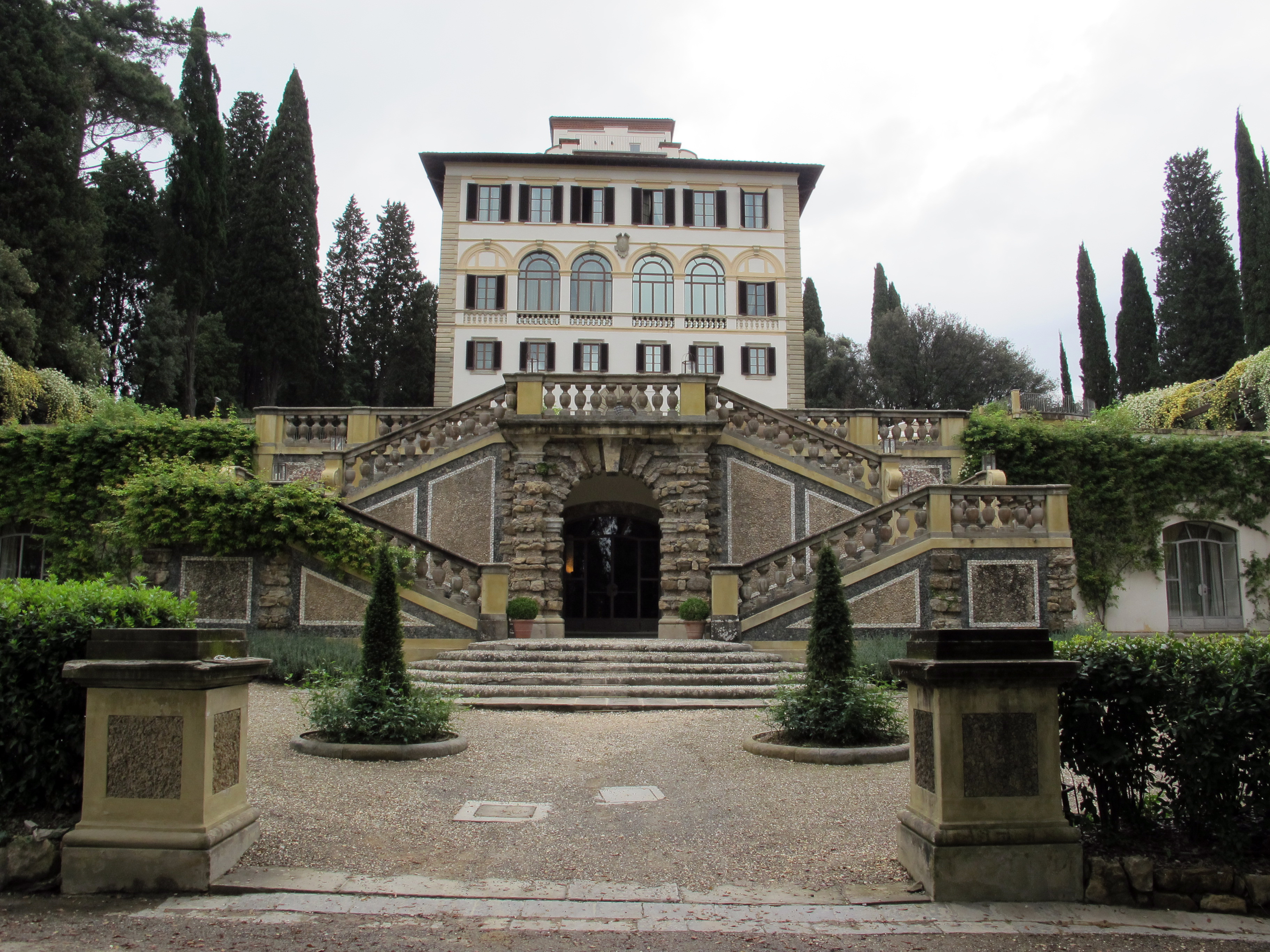
Villa Salviatino

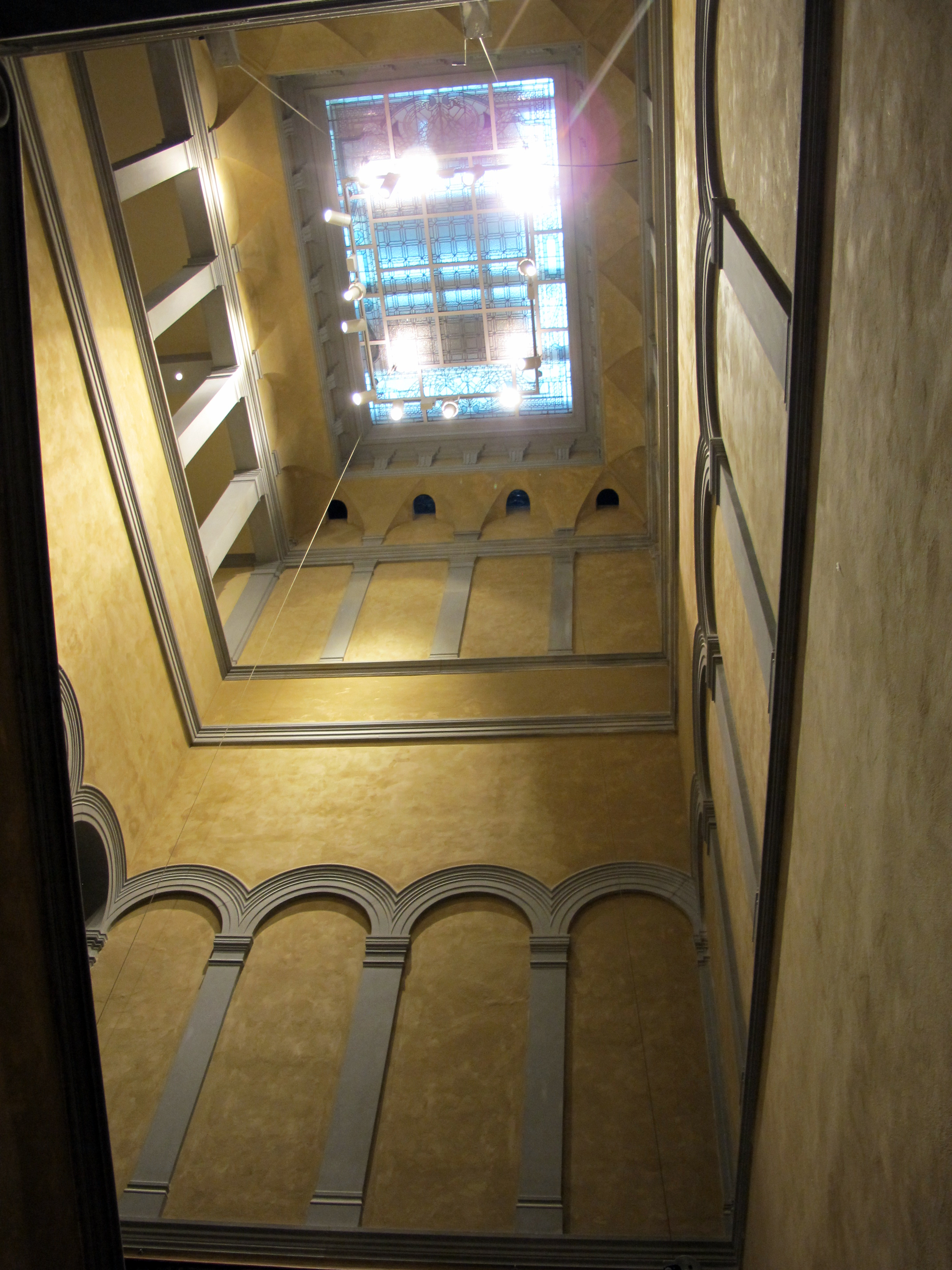
Villa Salviatino

The Villa Salviatino, Maiano, in the frazione of Maiano on the steep slope south of Fiesole, is a Tuscan villa overlooking Florence.

A modest farmhouse in the 14th century, set among informally terraced slopes planted with vines and olives, the house in its vigna was purchased in 1427 by the Bardi family, bankers of Florence, who rebuilt it in such palatial fashion that when it was subsequently sold to Nicola Tegliacci in 1447, the new owner named it Palagio (palazzo) dei Tegliacci. In the 16th century it passed to Alamanno Salviati, who had it sumptuously frescoed and furnished; thus it gained its name as the Villa Il Salviatino, to distinguish it from the grander Villa Salviati "le Selve", near Lastra, to the west. The villa was celebrated by Francesco Redi, in his Bacco in Toscana (1685): "viva il nome Del buon Salviati, ed il suo bel Maiano".

For a short period it was owned by the Italian tenor Giovanni Matteo Mario and his wife Giulia Grisi, the transaction was completed by financier N M Rothschild of London, then in 1871 the villa was purchased by Pietro Pagliano, who added a medievalizing crenellated tower, but a new, more sympathetic owner, the American Phelps Thomas, took ownership in 1882 and began a programme of free restoration and aggrandisement, to designs of the antiquarian architect Corinto Corinti (1843–1930). A large central staircase was added and grand cinquecento portals. He reduced the tower, designed a new vaulted porte-cochere for carriages, overhung by a garden, which still exist, and remodelled the park by adding an Italian terraced garden and conservatories, with a pergola that Penelope Hobhouse found to resemble the wooden frames shown in woodcuts for Francesco Colonna's Hypnerotomachia Poliphili. Augusto Bruschi was entrusted with decorative painting, covering walls with medieval and neo-cinquecento patterns. After a sale of its contents in 1891 the villa passed into the hands of the Carrega di Lucedio family and then, in 1911, to the art critic, journalist and founder of the art magazine Il Dedalo, Ugo Ojetti and his wife Fernanda, who undertook further structural remodeling, removing many of the 19th century accretions, and installing an extensive library and many paintings and sculptures. From 1973 to 1987 the Villa Il Salviatino housed Stanford University's overseas program Stanford in Italy with classrooms, offices, library, dining facilities, and students' rooms.

In the summer, including 1980, University of Michigan and Sara Lawrence College held their summer school program there.

In the first decade of the 21st century the villa was restored and refurbished as a boutique hotel.
