= St Paul's Church, Rusthall =

St Paul's Church
- Church of St Paul
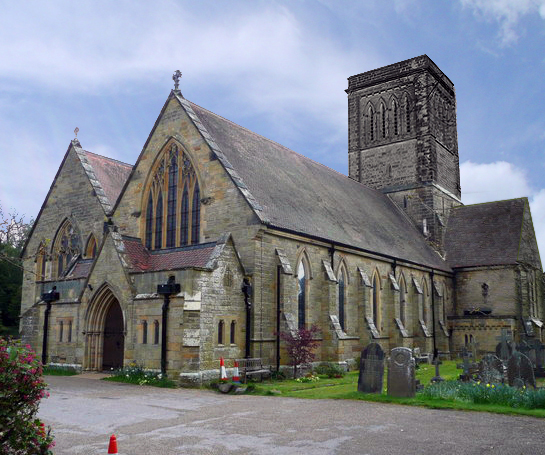
- St Paul's Church
- St Paul's Church
- 51.1308°N 0.2376°E
- OS grid reference: TQ5666439217
- Location: Rusthall
- Country: England
- Denomination: Anglican
- Website: St. Paul's Church

History
- Status: parish church
- Founder: Earl of Abergavenny
- Dedication: St Paul
- Consecrated: 1849

Architecture
- Functional status: Active
- Heritage designation: Grade II
- Designated: 7 June 1974
- Architect: Henry Isaac Stevens
- Architectural type: Gothic Revival
- Groundbreaking: 1849

Specifications
- Materials: Sandstone

Administration
- Province: Canterbury
- Diocese: Rochester
- Deanery: Tunbridge Wells
- Parish: Rusthall

St Paul's Church is a Church of England parish church in Rusthall, Kent, England. It is a Grade II listed building.

== History ==
St Paul's Church was built in 1849 on the edge of Rusthall Common by William Nevill, 4th Earl of Abergavenny as part of his Nevill Park Estate. The church was designed by Henry Isaac Stevens as he was working on another church in nearby Fordcombe. The building was financed by Henry Hardinge, 1st Viscount Hardinge because he was aware of Stevens' work in his native Derbyshire and wished to support him. Another architect, a local man named N. E. Stevens (no relation), was also involved in the design.

The church was built in a 13th-century (Early English Gothic) style as part of the Gothic revival movement. It was built out of local sandstone in a cruciform layout with a flat-roofed tower and belfry. It was then expanded in 1865 with an extra aisle and pews added and connected to the nave with a pointed arcade. In 1913 it was expanded again with a narthex porch added on the west side of the church. In 1922, Rusthall's war memorial was constructed outside St Paul's to commemorate soldiers from Rusthall who died in the First World War.

The church retained a number of its original fixtures including its original font, and as such in 1974 it was granted Grade II listed status. The war memorial and the churchyard wall on which it stands were also listed at Grade II at the same time. The church was seen as a symbol of the wealth of the borough of Tunbridge Wells as it was described by John Newton that: "the churchyard is chockablock with expensive tombstones and memorials".

== Additional buildings ==
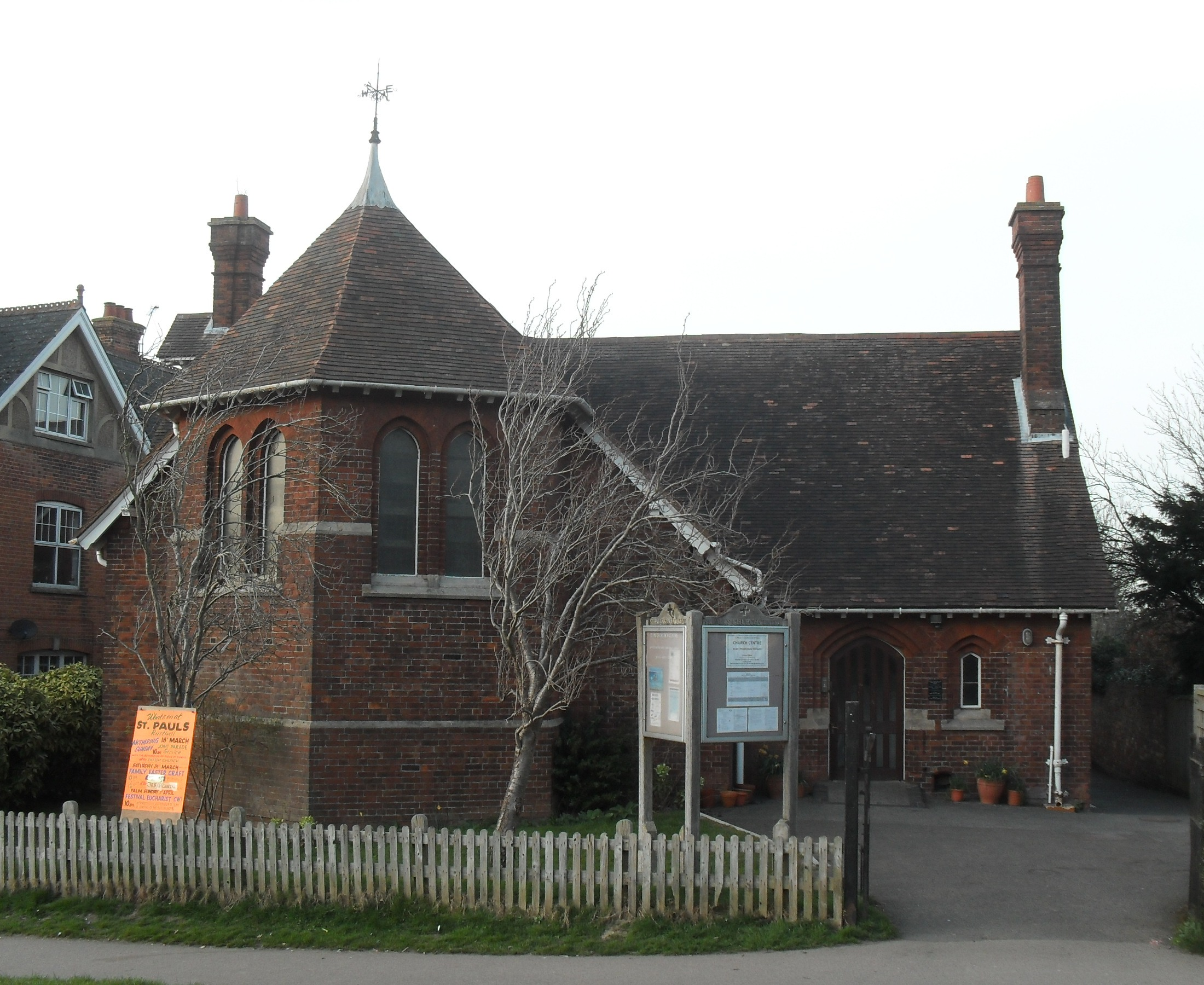
St Paul's Church Centre

As well as St Paul's Church being built, two school buildings were constructed on the site at the same time, although these were later converted into houses. In 1887, to accommodate the village expanding, a chapel of ease affiliated to St Paul's Church was built in the middle of Rusthall. This Mission church later became known as St Paul's Church Centre and is used as the parish hall of St Paul's Church as well as for hosting services, which up until the 1970s were conducted by a lay reader. It cost £1,000, paid for by Mr J. Stone-Wigg, and was designed by Henry Taylor. The simple brick and tile building has lancet windows and a bell-cot on the roof, and was extended in 1908.

== See also ==
- List of places of worship in Tunbridge Wells (borough)
- Media related to St Paul's Church, Rusthall at Wikimedia Commons
