= Rusthall Common =

Protected area in Kent, England

Coordinates: 51.133°N 0.240°E

- Site of Special Scientific Interest
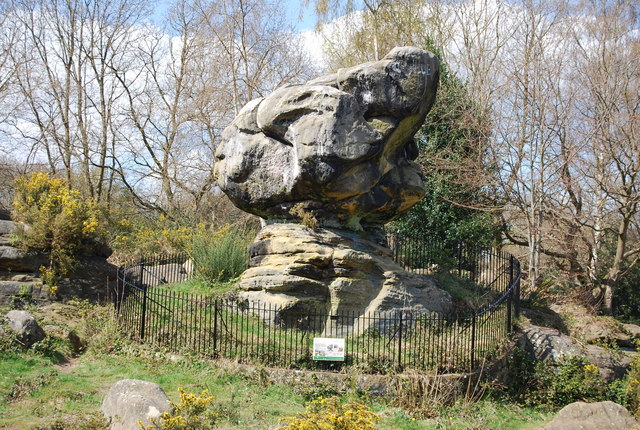
- Toad Rock
- Location of Rusthall Common.
- Area of search: Kent
- Grid reference: TQ 568 395
- Interest: Geological
- Area: 2.7 hectares (6.7 acres)
- Notification date: 1992
- Location map: Magic Map

Rusthall Common is a 2.7-hectare (6.7-acre) geological Site of Special Scientific Interest in Rusthall, a suburb of Tunbridge Wells in Kent. It is a Geological Conservation Review site. It is owned by the Manor of Rusthall and managed by Tunbridge Wells Commons Conservators.

This Quaternary site is important for its examples of sandstone weathering, especially Toad Rock, which stands on a narrow base moulded by periglacial wind erosion.

There is access to the site from Rusthall Road.
