= Antonino Fogliani =

Italian conductor (1976–2026)

- Fogliani in 2005
- Born: Antonino Pierpaolo Fogliani; 29 June 1976; Messina, Italy
- Died: 29 August 2026 (aged 50); Zurich, Switzerland
- Education: Bologna Conservatory; Milan Conservatory; Accademia Musicale Chigiana
- Occupations: Conductor; Festival director; Academic teacher
- Years active: 2001–2026
- Organizations: Rossini Opera Festival; Rossini in Wildbad; Deutsche Oper am Rhein; Palermo Conservatory
- Website: www.antoninofogliani.com

Antonino Pierpaolo Fogliani (29 June 1976 – 29 August 2026) was an Italian conductor, who led performances of Italian opera internationally. He was known as an expert in the bel canto operas of Rossini, Donizetti and of earlier Italian opera composers; he conducted at the Rossini Opera Festival in Pesaro from 2001 and at the Rossini in Wildbad festival in Germany from 2004, becoming its music director in 2011. They produced there many performances and recordings of less known works.

Fogliani conducted a broad repertoire internationally, including at La Scala in Milan and the Houston Grand Opera, and made many recordings. He was principal guest conductor of the Deutsche Oper am Rhein from 2017, where he led Italian works including several by Verdi and Puccini, and also Mozart operas and Poulenc's Dialogues des Carmélites. Fogliani taught orchestral conducting at the Palermo Conservatory from 2021.

== Life and career ==
Fogliani was born in Messina on 29 June 1976. He studied composition at the Conservatorio "G. B. Martini" in Bologna with Francesco Carluccio and graduated there as a pianist. He graduated with honours in orchestral conducting at the Milan Conservatory, under Vittorio Parisi. He graduated in music at the University of Bologna and furthered his musical training at the Accademia Musicale Chigiana in Siena, in conducting with Gianluigi Gelmetti and in composition with Franco Donatoni and Ennio Morricone. He became Gelmetti's assistant for both opera productions and concerts.

=== Italy ===
Fogliani made his professional debut at the Rossini Opera Festival in Pesaro in 2001 with Il viaggio a Reims It was the beginning of an international career with a focus on Rossini and his contemporaries. He went on to conduct productions such as at La Scala in Milan Donizetti's Ugo conte di Parigi in 2003. and Maria Stuarda, Mascagni's Amica and Rossini's Mosè in Egitto at the Rome Opera, Donizetti's Lucia di Lammermoor in St. Gallen, Verdi's Oberto conte di San Bonifacio in the Teatro Filarmonico in Verona, Rossini's Il barbiere di Siviglia at La Fenice in Venice in 2008, and Bellini's La sonnambula at the Teatro Calderón in Valladolid in 2009. In 2005, at the Teatro San Carlo in Naples, he conducted Paisiello's Il Socrate immaginario in the new version by Roberto De Simone; the work was reprised in the 2006/07 season at La Scala.

=== Rossini in Wildbad ===
Fogliani in 2011

Fogliani conducted at the Rossini in Wildbad festival first in 2004, where he led some first performances in modern times of Mercadante's Don Chisciotte alle nozze di Gamaccio and I briganti and Vaccaj's La sposa di Messina. For the 2011 festival, he orchestrated the seven numbers composed by Giovanni Tadolini in 1833 for Rossini's Stabat Mater (the orchestral version of which was lost) and conducted them in their first performance at Rossini in Wildbad. He became the festival's music director in 2011. In collaboration with Naxos, they produced performances and recordings of several less known bel canto works, including Rossini's L'inganno felice, L'occasione fa il ladro, Semiramide and Elisabetta, regina d'Inghilterra, Ermione and Francesco Morlacchi's Tebaldo e Isolina A reviewer noted that the conductor "delivers intimate masterclasses in bel canto conducting, with subtly nuanced colours". On 2 August 2026, he conducted L’occasione fa il ladro.

=== Deutsche Oper am Rhein ===
Fogliani was principal guest conductor of the Deutsche Oper am Rhein from 2017. He conducted there Bellini's I puritani and La sonnambula, Donizetti's Don Pasquale, Maria Stuarda, Lucia di Lammermoor, L'elisir d'amore, La Fille du régiment and Prima la mamma!, Mozart's Don Giovanni and Die Zauberflöte, Rossini's La Cenerentola, Il barbiere di Siviglia and L'Italiana in Algeri, Verdi's La traviata, Don Carlo, Macbeth and Otello, Puccini's Madama Butterfly, Tosca, La bohème and Turandot, Cilea's Adriana Lecouvreur, and Poulenc's Dialogues des Carmélites. His last performance was Il trovatore on 19 July, shortly after the premiere of the production.

=== International appearances ===
Fogliani made his American debut in 2011 conducting Lucia di Lammermoor at the Houston Grand Opera. In 2012, he debuted Aida at the Teatro Regio in Parma, adding to the Verdi repertoire which he had previously conducted including La battaglia di Legnano, and I Lombardi alla prima crociata. At the Bavarian State Opera, he conducted Rossini's Il barbiere di Siviglia and La Cenerentola, Donizetti's Lucia di Lammermoor, Lucrezia Borgia and La Fille du régiment, Verdi's Macbeth and Il trovatore, both as part of its opera festival, Otello, Falstaff and I masnadieri, Madama Butterfly and Turandot, Mascagni's Cavalleria rusticana and Leoncavallo's Pagliacci. He led performances of Verdi's Giovanna d'Arco at the Opéra de Rennes , of Le comte Ory at the Opéra-Comique in Paris, Mozart's Così fan tutte, Lucia di Lammermoor and Verdi's Rigoletto at the Opéra Royal de Wallonie in Liège, and Donizetti's Maria di Rohan at the Wexford Festival Opera.

In the 2009/10 season, he conducted L'elisir d'amore at the Teatro Lirico di Cagliari, L'Italiana in Algeri at the Opera de Mahón in Menorca, La bohème at both the Teatro Petruzzelli in Bari and the Opéra de Monte-Carlo, and Donizetti's Il diluvio universale in St. Gallen. He conducted Aida for the opening of the 2011/12 season at the Teatro Regio in Parma.

Fogliani conducted Rossini's La donna del lago in concert performances at the Opernhaus Zürich in April 2021. Offenbach's Les contes d'Hoffmann was played at the house for an audience in 2025, after it had been prepared for April 2021, when COVID-19 restrictions permitted only a live-streamed performance. Saimir Pirgu portrayed the title role. A reviewer described the conductor as "passionate" and "stylistically astute", and noted his "finely calibrated changes in tempo – urgent, highly dynamic passages alternated with moments of calm, always structurally well thought-out and convincingly shaped".

In September 2021 Fogliani conducted the concert for the reopening of the Teatro Coccia in Novara after the COVID-19 pandemic, and in January 2022 he conducted the Italian Philharmonic Orchestra at the house in La Cenerentola to open the next season.

=== Concerts ===
In the symphonic repertoire, Fogliani performed with many orchestras including the Orchestra dell'Accademia Nazionale di Santa Cecilia and of the Teatro dell'Opera di Roma, the orchestra of the Teatro Comunale di Bologna, the orchestra of the Teatro Massimo Bellini in Catania, Orchestra i Pomeriggi Musicali in Milan, the Orchestra of the Municipal Theatre of Santiago, the Sydney Symphony Orchestra, the Ensemble Orchestral de Paris, Orchestre National de Bretagne and the Württembergische Philharmonie Reutlingen, the Gürzenich Orchestra Cologne and the Monte Carlo Philharmonic Orchestra. He gave a concert at the Tchaikovsky Hall of the Russian Institute of Theatre Arts in Moscow. He also collaborated with the Düsseldorf Symphony Orchestra and the Neue Philharmonie Westfalen.

=== Teaching ===
From 2021, Fogliani taught orchestral conducting at the Conservatory A. Scarlatti in Palermo. He was appointed an Officer of the Order of Merit of the Italian Republic by President Sergio Mattarella in 2018.

=== Personal life ===
Fogliani lived with his wife, Angelica, and their son Lorenzo in Cadempino, Switzerland.

Fogliani died in Zurich on 29 August 2026, aged 50, after a long illness. A memorial service was held on 1 September 2026 at the Lugano Cathedral.

== Recordings ==
Fogliani recorded for Naxos, Dynamic, Arthaus Musik, and Bongiovanni.

- Donizetti, Ugo conte di Parigi, CD Dynamic (2004)
- Rossini, Ciro in Babilonia, CD Naxos (2005)
- Cimarosa, Il marito disperato, CD Bongiovanni (2006)
- Rossini, Mosè in Egitto, CD Naxos (2007)
- Rossini,Otello, CD Naxos (2010)
- Donizetti, Lucia di Lammermoor, CD Naxos (2011)
- Vaccaj, La sposa di Messina, CD Naxos (2012)
- Mercadante, Don Chisciotte alle nozze di Gamaccio, CD Naxos (2012)
- Rossini, L'occasione fa il ladro, CD Naxos (2012)
- Rossini, Semiramide, CD Naxos (2012)
- Bel canto bully – The musical legacy of the legendary opera impresario Domenico Barbaja, CD Naxos (2013)
- Mercadante, I Briganti, CD Naxos (2014)
- Rossini, L'inganno felice, CD Naxos (2015)
- Rossini, Guillaume Tell, CD Naxos (2015)
- Rossini, Il viaggio a Reims, CD Naxos (2016)
- Rossini, Stabat Mater, CD Naxos (2016)
- Rossini, Sigismondo, CD Naxos (2017)
- Bellini, Bianca e Gernando, CD Naxos (2017)
- Rossini, Bianca e Falliero, CD Naxos (2017)
- Rossini, Maometto II, CD Naxos (2018)
- Rossini, Il barbiere di Siviglia, CD Dynamic (2020)
- Morlacchi, Tebaldo e Isolina, CD Naxos (2020)
- Taralli, Cantus Bononiæ Missa Sancti Petronii, CD Tactus (2022)
- Rossini, Elisabetta regina d'Inghilterra, CD Naxos (2024)
- Rossini, Ermione, CD Naxos (2024)
- Saimir – Opera arias sung by Saimir Pirgu, Orquestra de la Comunitat Valenciana, OPUS ARTE (2024)

== Filmography ==
- Verdi, Aida, DVD/Blu-ray UNITEL (2012)
- Rossini, L'inganno felice, DVD Dynamic (2016)

== Sources ==
- Marcarini, Mario, and Navoni, Massimo, eds. (2009). Gaetano Donizetti, Maria Stuarda, Antonio Fogliani, Teratro Alla Scala. Mondadori Electa. ISBN 88-37-06515-9.
