= Rossini in Wildbad =

Bel canto opera festival

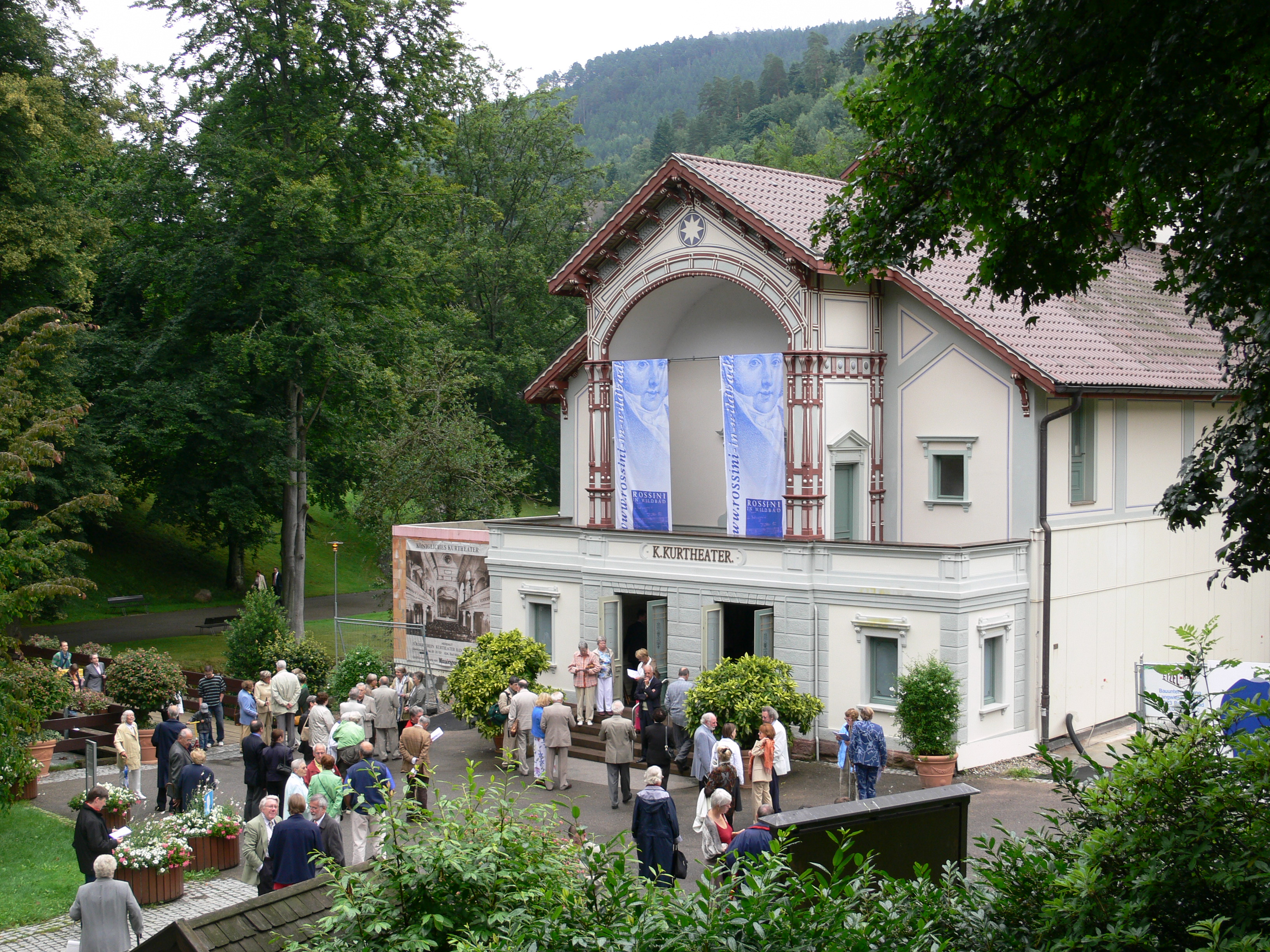
- The Königliches Kurtheater during the festival, 2008
- Genre: Bel canto opera
- Begins: June
- Ends: July
- Frequency: annual
- Locations: Bad Wildbad, Baden-Württemberg, Germany
- Inaugurated: 1989; 37 years ago
- Website: rossini-in-wildbad.de

Rossini in Wildbad is an annual bel canto opera festival in Bad Wildbad, Baden-Württemberg, Germany, specialising in the lesser-known operas of Gioachino Rossini and his contemporaries. The festival, which commemorates Rossini's stay at the spa town in 1856, was founded in 1989 by a group of people interested in restoring and reviving the spa facilities, especially the theatre. Usually held in June and July, it also features compositions of other composers from the bel canto period. Performances are held at various historic spa facilities including the Königliches Kurtheater and the König-Karls-Bad, in or near the spa park. Many productions have been recorded.

== History ==
Rossini at the Spa, sculpture by Karl-Henning Seemann, Kurpark Bad Wildbad

Gioachino Rossini, a prolific composer of Italian opera, stayed at Wildbad and used its spa for several weeks in 1856, which apparently invigorated him enough to start composing again. His wife Olympe Pélissier is said to have recommended the place because its water was very mild. Early in his career, until age 37, he had composed operas, many masterpieces that remained in the repertoire, but also operas that were neglected. After a hiatus of decades, he began to compose again after the spa visit, on German paper. He would later call his late compositions his "sins of old age" (Péchés de vieillesse).

The Rossini in Wildbad festival was founded in 1989 on an initiative of Margarete Bott. She and others wanted to see the Königliches Kurtheater (Royal spa theatre) restored and used again. She collaborated with the conductor Wilhelm Keitel as artistic director and the cultural manager Rüdiger Krüger responsible for organisation and management.

Jochen Schönleber became artistic director in 1992 and has been Intendant since 2000. Antonino Fogliani, an Italian conductor focused on Rossini, first worked at the festival in 2004 and was appointed music director in 2011.

- 1989–1992: Wilhelm Keitel, Rüdiger Krüger
- from 1992: Jochen Schönleber (artistic director, from 2000 Intendant)
- 2011–2026: Antonino Fogliani (music director)

=== Theme ===
The festival is focused on the complete operas by Rossini, both his well-known operas and the neglected repertoire. It also features compositions of other composers from the bel canto period, as well as different settings of librettos that Rossini used. Many festival productions have been broadcast and recorded on CD or DVD, in collaboration with labels Naxos and Bongiovanni. The festival works with young singers and has a regular orchestra, Virtuosi Brunensis, from Brno.

=== Venues ===
Neue Trinkhalle

The first opera performances were held at the Kurhaus, while the theatre was restored. From 2010 the main venue for opera performances and recordings was the Neue Trinkhalle, the hall where spa guests used to drink the mineral water. It seats 500 people. The Kurhaus venue was then used for rehearsals and concerts; the last scenic production at the Kurhaus was La gazza ladra in 2009.

The Königliches Kurtheater, reopened in 2014, seats 250. Another venue, Forum König-Karls-Bad, is in the König-Karls-Bad, formerly a bathing house called Haus des Gastes, now a conference centre. The festival also uses several open air locations for events. In 2026, the Kurhaus again became a festival venue.

All venues are in or near the Kurpark. It is connected to Pforzheim, the closest city, via the Enz Valley Railway which is part of the Stadtbahn Karlsruhe net. The starting times of performances are planned with respect to the tram's timetable.

=== Academy ===
An academy was founded in 2004, named Akademie BelCanto, in order to train young singers in the art of bel canto. Schönleber has been its director, and instructors have included Alberto Zedda and Kurt Widmer as well as Joyce DiDonato when she made a recording of La Cenerentola with the SWR Rundfunkorchester Kaiserslautern. Singers who were students of the academy include Michael Spyres, Olga Peretyatko, Diana Haller and Marina Viotti.

== List of operas performed ==
Year	Composer	Work	Venue, notes	Conductor
2026	Weckerlin	Le mariage en poste	Königliches Kurtheater, salon opera with piano, first revival	
2026	Arrieta	Marina	Kurhaus, zarzuela	José Miguel Pérez-Sierra
2026	Rossini / Carafa	Sémiramis	Kurhaus, in French, revival of the Paris version of 1860 including ballet music, concert performance	Andriy Yurkevych
2026	Rossini	L'occasione fa il ladro	Königliches Kurtheater	Antonio Fogliani / Jacopo Brusa
2026	Rossini	La gazza ladra	Kurhaus, merge of versions from Naples 1819 and 1820	Pérez-Sierra
2025	Rossini	La Cenerentola	Königliches Kurtheater	Pérez-Sierra
2025	Rossini	L'inganno felice	Königliches Kurtheater	Fogliani
2025	García	Un avvertimento ai gelosi	Königliches Kurtheater, production by opera studio of Teatro Carlo Felice in Genova	with piano
2025	Poniatowski	Pierre de Médicis	Trinkhalle, concert performance, by Passionart and Filharmonia K. Szymanowskiego Krakowie	Pérez-Sierra
2025	Rossini	Otello	Trinkhalle, revival of 1820 version from Rome, with lieto fine	Nicola Pascoli
2024	Carafa	Masaniello	Trinkhalle, concert performance, recording	Pascoli
2024	Rossini	Le comte Ory	Trinkhalle, Rossini's first French opera	Fogliani
2024	Rossini	L'italiana in Algeri	Königliches Kurtheater, production of the academy	Pérez-Sierra
2023	Rossini	Il signor Bruschino	Königliches Kurtheater	Pérez-Sierra
2023	Rossini	Il barbiere di Siviglia	Trinkhalle	Fogliani
2023	Pacini	Gli arabi nelle Gallie ossia Il trionfo della fede	Trinkhalle, concert performance	Marco Alibrando
2023	Rossini	Il vero omaggio	tower of the Baumwipfelpfad	Fogliani
2022	Rossini	Adina ossia Il califfo di Bagdad	Königliches Kurtheater	Luciano Acocella
2022	Rossini	Ermione	Trinkhalle	Fogliani
2022	Rossini	Armida	Trinkhalle	Pérez-Sierra
2021	Rossini	Elisabetta, regina d'Inghilterra	open hall, with Passionart	Fogliani
2021	Rossini	La scala di seta	pool, open air	Pérez-Sierra
2021	Auber	Le philtre	open hall, first revival	Acocella
2021	García	I tre Gobbi	pool, open air	Paolo Raffo
2020	García	L'isola disabitata	open air, with piano	Andrés Jesús Gallucci
2019	Meyerbeer	Romilda e Costanza	first revival	Acocella
2019	Rossini	Matilde di Shabran	Trinkhalle	Pérez-Sierra
2019	Rossini	Tancredi	Königliches Kurtheater, with Passionart, Krakov	Fogliani
2019	García	I tre Gobbi	Königliches Kurtheater, first revival	Gallucci
2019	Mayr	L'accademia di musica	Königliches Kurtheater	
2018	Rossini	Petite messe solennelle / Giovanna d'Arco	Forum König-Karls-Bad	
2018	Rossini	L'equivoco stravagante	Königliches Kurtheater, production from the Bulgarian National Opera	
2018	Rossini	La cambiale di matrimonio	Königliches Kurtheater, Rossini's first farsa	
2018	Rossini	Moïse	Trinkhalle	
2018	Rossini	Zelmira	Trinkhalle, concert performance, German premiere	
2018	Rossini	Le nozze di Teti e di Peleo	Trinkhalle, staged wedding cantata	
2017	Garcia	Le cinesi		
2017	Rossini	L'occasione fa il ladro	recording	Fogliani
2017	Rossini	Maometto secondo		Fogliani
2017	Rossini	Aureliano in Palmira	concert version	
2017	Rossini	Eduardo e Cristina	concert version	Gianluigi Gelmetti
2016	Balducci	Il conte di Marsico	Königliches Kurtheater, guest performance by Teatro Sarrià, Barcelona	
2016	Bellini	Bianca e Gernando	concert version	
2016	Rossini	Sigismondo		
2016	Rossini	Demetrio e Polibio		
2015	Rossini	L'inganno felice		
2015	García	Le cinesi	guest performance by Teatro Sarrià, Barcelona	
2015	Rossini	Bianca e Falliero		
2015	Rossini	L'italiana in Algeri	concert version	
2015	Lindpaintner	Il vespro siciliano	concert version	
2014	Rossini	Il viaggio a Reims	concert version	
2014	Rossini	Il viaggio a Reims		Fogliani
2014	Rossini	Adelaide di Borgogna	third scenic production, broadcast by Deutschlandfunk	Alcocella
2014	Morlacchi	Tebaldo ed Isolina	concert version	
2013	Rossini	Guillaume Tell		Fogliani
2013	Adam	Le Chalet		
2013	Rossini	Ricciardo e Zoraide		
2012	Mercadante	I briganti	first revival	Fogliani
2012	Rossini	Adina		
2012	Rossini	Semiramide	concert version	
2011	Balducci	Il noce di Benevento		
2011	Pavesi	Ser Marcantonio		
2011	Rossini / Tadolini	Stabat Mater	Version from 1833, orchestrated by Antonino Fogliani	
2011	Rossini	Giovanna d'Arco	orchestrated by Marco Taralli	
2011	Rossini	Il turco in Italia		
2010	Generali	Adelina		
2010	Rossini	La cenerentola		
2010	Rossini	Le siège de Corinthe	concert version	
2009	Rossini	Il signor Bruschino		
2009	Rossini	La gazza ladra	Kurhaus	
2009	Vaccai	La sposa di Messina	concert version	
2008	Pacini	Il convitato di pietra		
2008	Rihm	Kolonos	World premiere, in double bill with Edipo a Colono	
2008	Rossini	Edipo a Colono	concert version	
2008	Rossini	L'italiana in Algeri	concert version	
2008	Rossini	Otello ossia Il moro di Venezia		Fogliani
2007	Balducci	Boabdil, re di Granata		
2007	Rossini	La gazzetta		
2007	Rossini	La scala di seta		
2007	Mercadante	Don Chisciotte alle nozze di Gamaccio	concert version	
2006	Rossini	I due Figaro (Carafa)		
2006	Balducci	I gelosi		
2006	Rossini	La cambiale di matrimonio	Kurhaus, Rossini's first farsa	
2006	Rossini	La donna del lago		
2006	Rossini	Mosè in Egitto		
2005	Meyerbeer	Semiramide riconosciuta	semi-staged	
2005	Rossini	L'inganno felice		
2005	Rossini	L'occasione fa il ladro		
2004	Mayr	L'amor coniugale		
2004	Rossini	La cenerentola	concert version	
2004	Rossini	Ciro in Babilonia		
2004	Rossini	Il barbiere di Siviglia	concert version	
2003	Rossini	Torvaldo e Dorliska		
2003	Mayr	L'accademia di musica		
2003	Mosca	L'italiana in Algeri		
2002	Winter	Maometto		
2002	Rossini	Maometto secondo		
2002	Rossini	Le comte Ory		
2001	Rossini	La pietra del paragone		
2001	Pucitta	Verter	sometimes attributed to Simon Mayr	
2000	Rossini	L'equivoco stravagante		
1999	Rossini	Elisabetta, regina d'Inghilterra		
1998	Rossini	Matilde di Shabran		
1997	Rossini	Eduardo e Cristina		
1996	Rossini	Aureliano in Palmira		
1995	Rossini	Sigismondo		
1994	Rossini	Le nozze di Teti e di Peleo	staged cantata	
1993	Rossini	L'equivoco stravagante	Rossini's first opera, in the first own production	
1992	Rossini	Edipo a Colono		
1991	Rossini	Semiramide		
1990	Rossini	L'occasione fa il ladro		
1989	Rossini	La scala di seta		
