= Vieni fra queste braccia =

Vieni fra queste braccia may refer to:

- "Vieni fra queste braccia", a duet from the opera I puritani
- "Vieni fra queste braccia", a cabaletta from the opera La gazza ladra
