= La pietra del paragone =

Opera by Gioachino Rossini

- Melodramma by Gioachino Rossini
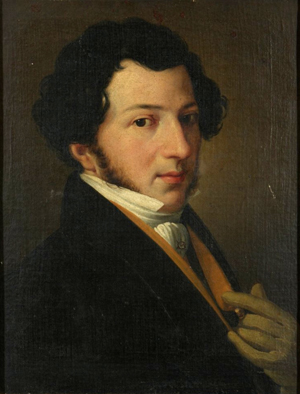
- Rossini ca. 1815
- Librettist: Luigi Romanelli
- Language: Italian
- Premiere: 26 September 1812; La Scala, Milan

La pietra del paragone (The Touchstone) is an opera, or melodramma giocoso, in two acts by Gioachino Rossini, to an original Italian libretto by Luigi Romanelli.

== Performance history ==
La pietra del paragone was first performed at La Scala, Milan, on 26 September 1812. It was Rossini's first commission from La Scala, and its initial run of 53 performances was considered a major success for the young composer.It was the composer's first commission from a major opera house and was an instant success, being performed 53 times during its first season.

Napoleon's Viceroy in Milan, Eugène de Beauharnais, was so impressed by the opera that he wrote to the Minister of the Interior, "You will kindly arrange for Maestro Joachin Rossini to be exempted from military service. I cannot take it upon myself to expose to the enemy's fire such a precious existence; my contemporaries would never forgive me. We are perhaps losing a mediocre soldier, but we are surely saving a man of genius for the nation."

The first performance of the opera in Rio de Janeiro was in 1826. Despite its early success in Europe the work did not receive its North American premiere until 1955 and the British professional premiere was at the St Pancras Town Hall in 1963. In more recent times, Eduardo De Filippo and Paolo Tomaselli directed a production for the Piccola Scala in 1982, which later toured to the Edinburgh International Festival and the Teatro Donizetti in Bergamo. At various times, the cast included Margherita Guglielmi, Julia Hamari, Alessandro Corbelli, Claudio Desderi and Justino Díaz, conductor Roberto Abbado.

== Roles ==
Role	Voice type	Premiere cast, 26 September 1812 (Conductor: Alessandro Rolla)
Count Asdrubale	bass	Filippo Galli
Clarice	contralto	Marietta Marcolini
Giocondo	tenor	Claudio Bonoldi
Pacuvio, a poet	baritone	Pietro Vasoli
Donna Fulvia	mezzo-soprano	Orsola Fei
Macrobio, a journalist	baritone	Antonio Parlamagni
Baroness Aspasia	soprano	Carolina Zerbini
Fabrizio	bass	Paolo Rossignoli
Gardeners, guests, soldiers, hunters

== Synopsis ==
The ‘’Touchstone’’ of the title is a plan devised by Count Asdrubale to test the sincerity of Donna Fulvia, Baroness Aspasia and Marchioness Clarice, each of whom claims to love the wealthy nobleman.

Place: Count Asdrubale's villa in the country.

Time: The early 19th century.

=== Act 1 ===
Pacuvio is attempting to interest the other house guests in his tedious poetic verses, but everyone has other preoccupations and his endeavours are largely ignored. Asdrubale himself is deeply attracted to Clarice, but being pursued by three women at the same time, he is uncertain that he can trust any one of them. Furthermore Clarice is hotly pursued by the Count's friend Giocondo and which of the two men she prefers is far from clear.

Asdrubale enlists the help of his majordomo Fabrizio to test the genuineness of the ladies' emotions. When most of the guests happen to be together with the Count, Fabrizio produces an urgent letter which has apparently just arrived. On opening it Asdrubale reacts with a convincing show of horror and despair at its contents before hurrying away to his private rooms.

News rapidly spreads amongst the guests that the Count has been ruined. Fulvia and Aspasia cannot wait to leave, feeling that they have had a lucky escape. However, the arrival of an exotic oriental potentate is announced. He is Asdrubale's creditor, and in consequence now the owner of all of his property and possessions. Immediately most of the house guests transfer their attentions and flattery to the new arrival, failing to recognize that it is Asdrubale in heavy disguise and using a ridiculous fake accent.

Only Giocondo and Clarice demonstrate any concern for the Count. When he is finally persuaded to leave his private rooms (the "wealthy oriental creditor" having departed) they promise their continued loyalty and financial support. The other guests decline to offer any tangible help. At that moment Fabrizio bursts in and announces that Asdrubale's debts have miraculously been cleared and that he is once again a wealthy man. The general rejoicing contrasts with the consternation amongst those guests who realize that they have been tricked into revealing their falseness and base motives to the Count.

=== Act 2 ===
Recriminations amongst the guests are rife. Fulvia and Aspasia urge Pacuvio and Macrobio to exact revenge on the Count and Giocondo by challenging them to a duel. Inherent cowardice prevails and by bluster and outright lying on the part of Pacuvio, confrontation is avoided.

Asdrubale invites his guests to go hunting and Pacuvio further demonstrates his cowardly nature by panicking when a storm blows up and losing his gun and other possessions in a headlong dash back to the villa. Meanwhile Giocondo is continuing his amorous pursuit of Clarice, who is flattered by the young man's attentions and, although she loves the Count, offers no objections to Giocondo continuing his flirtatious advances. This last part of the conversation is overheard by Macrobio, who takes great delight in repeating it to the Count. Naturally, Asdrubale's jealousy flares up, much to Clarice's annoyance.

Clarice decides that, as her love has been tested by the Count, she will test him in return. She informs him that her twin brother has just returned from military service and is coming to the villa to find her.

Word of the fictional duel in which they had both apparently been humiliated has now reached the Count and Giocondo, and they are determined on revenge. They corner Macrobio and force him to admit that he is a pathetic, ignorant coward. Having achieved this groveling surrender, all is forgiven and forgotten.

Clarice enters disguised as her twin, complete with a retinue of soldiers. "He" announces that he has had "his sister" taken away and the Count will never see her again. Asdrubale is distraught and once again locks himself in his private rooms, threatening suicide. As a final act he asks Fabrizio to deliver a note to the young officer for Clarice, regretting his ridiculous jealousy. Clarice realizes that she has achieved her victory and sends the note back with her signature on it. The Count recognizes the signature and comes rushing from his rooms.

To general amazement Clarice throws off her disguise and the lovers are finally reconciled. The Count orders a celebration feast and all the guests head off to toast the happy couple and enjoy the promised banquet.

== Recordings ==
Year	Cast: Asdrubale, Clarice, Giocondo, Pacuvio	Conductor, opera house and orchestra	Label
1971	John Reardon, Beverly Wolff, José Carreras, Justino Díaz	Newell Jenkins, New York Clarion Concerts Orchestra and Chorus	CD: Vanguard Classics; Cat: 08-9031-73
2002	Marco Vinco, Carmen Oprisanu, Raúl Giménez, Bruno De Simone	Carlo Rizzi, Orchestra of Teatro Comunale di Bologna and Prague Chamber Chorus (Recording of a performance at the Rossini Opera Festival, Pesaro, August 2002)	CD: Rossini Opera Festival; Cat: ROF 11053
2004	Raffaele Costantini, Agata Bienkowska, Alessandro Codeluppi, Gioacchino Zarrelli	Alessandro de Marchi, Czech Chamber Soloists and Chorus (Recording of performances made at the Rossini in Wildbad Festival, July 2001)	CD: Naxos; Cat: 8.660093-95
2007	François Lis, Sonia Prina, José Manuel Zapata, Christian Senn	Jean-Christophe Spinosi, Ensemble Matheus and the Chorus of Teatro Regio di Parma (Video recording made at performances in the Théâtre du Châtelet, Paris, January 2007)	DVD: Naïve Records; Cat: V 5089
