= Torvaldo e Dorliska =

Opera by Gioachino Rossini

- Opera semiseria by Gioachino Rossini
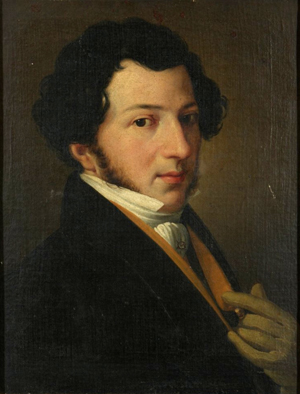
- Rossini c. 1815
- Librettist: Cesare Sterbini
- Language: Italian
- Based on: Les Amours du chevalier de Faublas by Jean-Baptiste Louvet de Couvray
- Premiere: 26 December 1815; Teatro Valle, Rome

Torvaldo e Dorliska is an opera semiseria in two acts by Gioachino Rossini to an Italian libretto by Cesare Sterbini, based on the novel/memoir Les Amours du chevalier de Faublas (1787–1790) by the revolutionary Jean-Baptiste Louvet de Couvray, whose work was the source of the Lodoïska libretto set by Luigi Cherubini (1791), and Lodoiska set by Stephen Storace (1794), and Simon Mayr (1796).

Torvaldo e Dorliska is a rescue opera with an eventual happy ending. The inclusion of buffo roles is the reason for its designation as a 'semiserio' work, similar to Rossini's La gazza ladra.

== Performance history ==
Torvaldo and Dorliska was first performed at the Teatro Valle, Rome, on 26 December 1815. It remained in the repertory and appeared in several Italian cities including Venice for the next twenty five years, though it was never a great critical success. While there were no productions staged in London nor New York, it was staged in ten European cities in the ten years after its Rome premiere.

The opera was presented in Vienna in 1987 and in Savona in 1989. It was given at the Rossini Opera Festival in Pesaro as part of the 2006 season and again in 2017.

== Roles ==
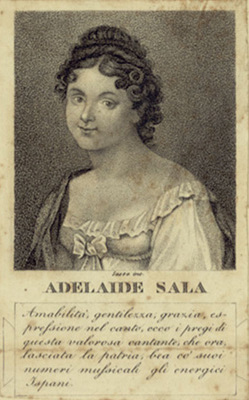
Adelaide Sala, who created the role of Dorliska, by Giovanni Sasso

Roles, voice types, premiere cast
| Role | Voice type | Premiere cast, 26 December 1815 Conductor: – |
|---|---|---|
| Torvaldo | tenor | Domenico Donzelli |
| Dorliska, wife of Torvaldo | soprano | Adelaide Sala |
| Duke of Ordow | bass | Filippo Galli |
| Giorgio, guardian of the castle | baritone | Raniero Remorini |
| Carlotta, his sister | mezzo-soprano | Agnese Loiselet |
| Ormondo | bass | Cristoforo Bastianelli |

== Synopsis ==
Time: The Middle Ages
Place: "In and around the Castle of the Duke of Ordow"

The opera tells the story of the love between the Knight Torvaldo and his wife Dorliska, which is opposed by the terrible and violent Duke of Ordow, who is in love with Dorliska. In order to take her for himself, the Duke tries to kill Torvaldo and, after their fight, leaves him for dead. Making her way to the Duke's castle but not knowing that it is his home, Dorliska is held prisoner, comforted only by Carlotta and her brother Giorgio, the keeper of the castle. After escaping an ambush, Torvaldo enters the castle in disguise, but his identity is inadvertently revealed by Dorliska. The Duke then sentences him to death. Carlotta, Giorgio, and their friends conspire against the Duke to free the couple. Carlotta manages to steal the keys to Torvaldo's prison cell, and Dorliska embraces him again. However, the couple is discovered by the Duke, but before he can kill them, he is interrupted by the crowd entering the castle. The rebellious people capture the Duke and he is led away to prison and to his death. Torvaldo and Dorliska are freed.

== Recordings ==
| Year | Cast: Dorliska, Torvaldo, Il Duca d'Ordow, Giorgio, Carlotta | Conductor, opera house and orchestra | Label |
|---|---|---|---|
| 1976 | Lella Cuberli, Pietro Bottazzo, Siegmund Nimsgern, Enzo Dara, Lucia Valentini-Terrani | Alberto Zedda, Orchestra and choir of Rai di Milano. | |
| 1992 | Fiorella Pediconi, Ernesto Palacio, Stefano Antonucci, Mauro Buda, Nicoletta Marani | Massimo de Bernart, Orchestra and Chorus of RadioTelevisione Svizzera Italiana and the Gruppo Vocale Cantemus | Audio CD: Arkadia, Cat: CDAK 123-2; Agorá, Cat: AG 073.2 |
| 2003 | Paola Cigna, Huw Rhys-Evans, Michele Bianchini, Mario Utzeri, Annarita Gemmabella | Alessandro De Marchi; Czech Chamber Soloists and the ARS Brunensis Chamber Choir | Audio CD: Naxos Records; Cat: 8.660189-90 |
| 2006 | Darina Takova, Francesco Meli, Michele Pertusi, Bruno Praticò, Jeannette Fischer | Víctor Pablo Pérez, Orchestra Haydn di Bolzano e Trento and the Prague Chamber Chorus (Audio recording made at performances at the Rossini Opera Festival, Pesaro) | Audio CD: Dynamic; Cat: CDS 528/1-2 |
