= L'occasione fa il ladro =

Opera by Gioachino Rossini

L’occasione fa il ladro
- Opera by Gioachino Rossini
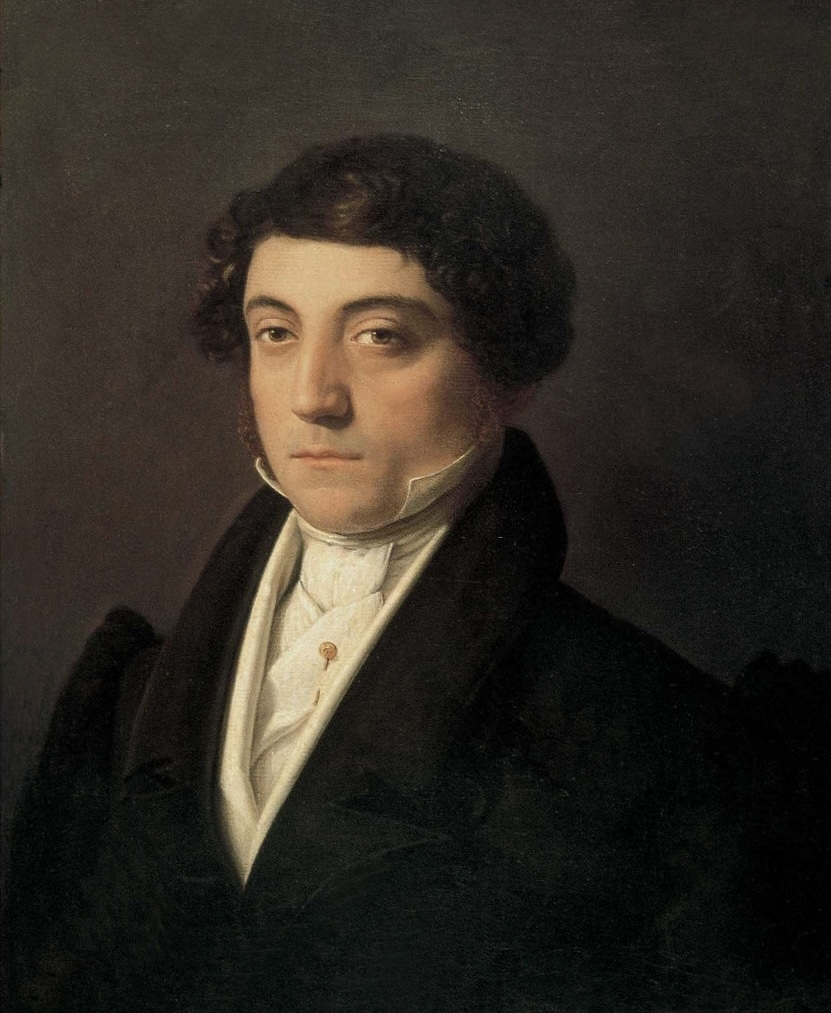
- Portrait of the composer
- Translation: Opportunity Makes a Thief
- Librettist: Luigi Prividali
- Language: Italian
- Based on: Eugène Scribe's Le prétendu par hasard, ou L’occasion fait le larron
- Premiere: 24 November 1812; Teatro San Moisè, Venice

L’occasione fa il ladro, ossia Il cambio della valigia (English: Opportunity Makes a Thief, or The Exchanged Suitcase) is an opera (burletta per musica or farsa) in one act by Gioachino Rossini to an Italian libretto by Luigi Prividali, based on Le prétendu par hasard, ou L’occasion fait le larron, an 1810 vaudeville by Eugène Scribe.

== Performance history ==
19th century

L’occasione fa il ladro was first performed at the Teatro San Moisè, Venice, on 24 November 1812. Of the five one-act operas that he wrote for the theatre, this was the one performed most often during the composer's lifetime but it was neglected after his death. There was, however, a revival at Pesaro in 1892 celebrating the hundredth anniversary of his birth there on 29 February 1792, with Alessandro Bonci.

20th century and beyond

The opera was given at the Théâtre Nouveau in Nice in 1983 and, in 1987, presented at the Rossini Opera Festival in Pesaro, directed by Jean-Pierre Ponnelle, where it was recorded. In the same year, it was given at the Buxton Festival. In addition it was "revived at the Macerata Opera (1992), in Paris, in Cologne and in the Schlosstheater Schwetzingen".

In April 1991 it was presented at the Politeama Garibaldi in Palermo, conducted by Antonello Allemandi with the orchestra and chorus of the Teatro Massimo. Rockwell Blake sang Count Alberto. A performance under Gianluigi Gelmetti with the Stuttgarter Rundfunkorchester was given in 1992, the cast including Susan Patterson and Alessandro Corbelli.

The Ponnelle production was revived during the 2013 season at the Rossini Opera Festival. One reviewer notes that the cast members were mostly native Italians.

In Britain, Opera North presented a number of English-language performances in 2004 as part of their Eight Little Greats season. The opera was entitled Love’s Luggage Lost, and the production was directed by Christopher Alden and conducted by David Parry.

The opera was presented in September 2017 at La Fenice, directed by Elisabetta Brusa, in collaboration with the Venetian Accademia di Belle Arti.

== Roles ==
Role	Voice type	Premiere Cast, 24 November 1812 (Conductor: - )
Don Parmenione	baritone	Luigi Pacini
Martino, his servant	bass	Filippo Spada
Count Alberto	tenor	Tommaso Berti
Don Eusebio	tenor	Gaetano Dal Monte
Berenice, his niece and ward	soprano	Giacinta Canonici
Ernestina, her friend	soprano	Carolina Nagher

== Synopsis ==
Time: 18th Century
Place: In and near Naples

During a storm, three travellers take refuge in an inn in the country. Alberto has been betrothed to a woman whom he has never met, and is on his way to meet her. Don Parmenione, accompanied by Martino, is trying to trace a friend's sister, who has disappeared. When the storm is over, Alberto leaves, accidentally taking Parmenione's luggage with him instead of his own. Martino opens Alberto's suitcase and discovers, among his papers, a portrait, presumably of the bride-to-be. Parmenione decides to masquerade as Alberto and claim the bride for himself.

At Don Eusebio's house, Ernestina, who has fallen on hard times, agrees to extend her stay and take on the role of Berenice's companion. Berenice, worried about marrying a man whom she has never met, asks Ernestina to pretend to be her. She herself will meanwhile play the role of a maid, so that she can observe Alberto and decide whether she is prepared to marry him. Parmenione, accompanied by Martino, now announces himself as Alberto and pays court to the disguised Ernestina, notwithstanding that she is not the lady in the portrait. The two are attracted to each other.

Alberto himself arrives, and meets the pretended maid, Berenice. A mutual attraction also springs up between these two, but Berenice is disconcerted to learn that Alberto has apparently already arrived and can prove who he is, whereas this man has no papers to identify him. The real Alberto and the imposter each try to convince Eusebio that they are who they say they are, and Berenice, who knows which one she would rather marry, subjects Parmenione to a severe cross-examination. He is eventually forced to admit his deception. Berenice can now marry Alberto and Parmenione can marry Ernestina – who turns out to be the woman he was trying to trace, the sister of his friend. And the portrait in Alberto's luggage? It was of his own sister, to be given to Berenice as a wedding-present.

== Recordings ==
Year	Cast: Berenice, Ernestina, Conte Alberto, Don Parmenione	Conductor, Opera House and Orchestra	Label
1953	Gianna Russo, Giuseppina Salvi, Flavio Sacchi, Nestore Catalani	Giuseppe Morelli, Chorus and Orchestra of Societa del Quartetto, Rome, Compagnia del Teatro dell' Opera Comica di Roma, Armida Senatra, Director	LP: Period Records; Cat: SPL-595
1987	Luciana Serra, Luciana D’Intino, Raúl Giménez, J Patrick Raftery	Salvatore Accardo, Orchestra Giovanile Italiana (Audio recording of a performance (or of performances) at the Rossini Opera Festival, Pesaro)	Audio CD: Ricordi Fonit Cetra; Cat: RFCD 2001
1992	María Bayo, Francesca Provvisionato, Iorio Zennaro, Natale de Carolis	Marcello Viotti, English Chamber Orchestra	Audio CD: Claves; Cat: 50-9208-9
2012	Elizaveta Martirosyan, Fanie Antonelou, Garðar Thór Cortes, Gianpiero Ruggieri	Antonino Fogliani, Württemberg Philharmonic Orchestra (Recording of performances at the Rossini in Wildbad Festival, 2005)	Audio CD: Naxos; Cat: 8.660314-15
