= L'inganno felice =

Opera by Gioachino Rossini

- Opera by Gioachino Rossini
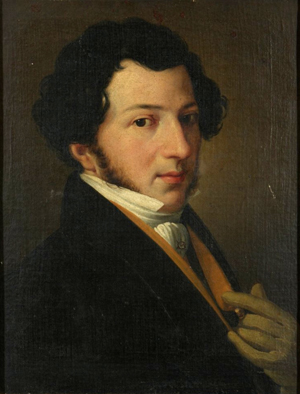
- Rossini c. 1815
- Librettist: Giuseppe Maria Foppa
- Language: Italian
- Premiere: 8 January 1812; Teatro San Moisè, Venice

L'inganno felice (The Fortunate Deception) is an opera in one act by Gioachino Rossini with a libretto by Giuseppe Maria Foppa.

Rossini called his opera a farsa, although as Richard Osborne explains: "Its designation as a farsa is misleading in the light of its semiseria status as a romantic melodrama with buffo elements." The work has much in common with French Revolutionary operas such as Cherubini's Les deux journées.

It was first performed at the Teatro San Moisè, Venice on 8 January 1812 and was an instant success.

== Performance history ==
By the end of the 1810s it had been heard in theatres throughout Italy as well as in Paris and London. Following this triumph, Rossini was commissioned to write three more operas by the manager of the Teatro San Moisè.

L'inganno felice was performed at La Fenice in Venice in September 2014.

== Roles ==
Role	Voice type	Premiere Cast, 8 January 1812 (Conductor: - )
Isabella	soprano	Teresa Belloc-Giorgi
Duca Bertrando	tenor	Raffaele Monelli
Batone	bass (or baritone)	Filippo Galli
Tarabotto	bass	Luigi Raffanelli
Ormondo	bass (or baritone)	Vincenzo Venturi

== Synopsis ==
Before the action begins, the villainous Ormondo was in love with Isabella, who was happily married to Duke Bertrando, but, when she rejected his advances, Ormondo spread vicious rumours about her reputation and bribed Batone into casting her adrift in a boat on the sea. However, she was rescued by a local miner, Tarabotto, who then disguised her as his niece, Nisa.

Time: The distant past
Place: A seaside mining village in Italy

The opera begins ten years after her rescue. Duke Bertrando is due to visit the mines. Isabella, who is still in love with her husband, finally reveals her true identity to Tarabotto who promises to help her. The duke arrives with Ormondo and Batone. The duke is still in love with his wife even though he believes the rumours that she had been unfaithful to him. Batone catches sight of "Nisa" and realises she is Isabella in disguise. He plots with Ormondo to abduct her that night, but Tarabotto overhears their plan. Before they can kidnap Isabella, the two villains are unmasked and "Nisa"'s true story is revealed when she shows everyone her duchess' clothes and a portrait of the duke she has kept with her. Bertrando and Isabella are reunited.

== Recordings ==
Year	Cast: Isabella, Bertrando, Batone, Tarabotto	Conductor, Opera House and Orchestra	Label
1992	Natale De Carolis, Amelia Felle, Iorio Zennaro, Fabio Previato, Danilo Serraiocco	Marcello Viotti, English Chamber Orchestra Phillip Morris Collection	Audio DC: CLAVES Cat: CD 50-9211
1996	Annick Massis, Raúl Giménez, Rodney Gilfry, Pietro Spagnoli	Mark Minkowski, Le Concert des Tuileries Orchestra (Recorded at performances in the Théâtre de Poissy, 12–17 June)	Audio CD: ERATO; Cat: 0630 17579-2
1999	Carmela Remigio, Luigi Petroni, Lorenzo Regazzo, Paolo Rumetz, Roberto Scaltriti	Giancarlo Andretta, Orchestra del Teatro La Fenice (Recorded Padova October 24, 1998)	Audio CD: Monda Musica; Cat: MFON 20142
2005	Corinna Mologni, Kenneth Tarver, Marco Vinco, Lorenzo Regazzo	Alberto Zedda, Brno Chamber Soloists (Recorded at concert performances in the Königliches Kurtheater, Rossini in Wildbad, July)	Audio CD: Naxos Records; Cat: 8.660233-34
