= König-Karls-Bad =

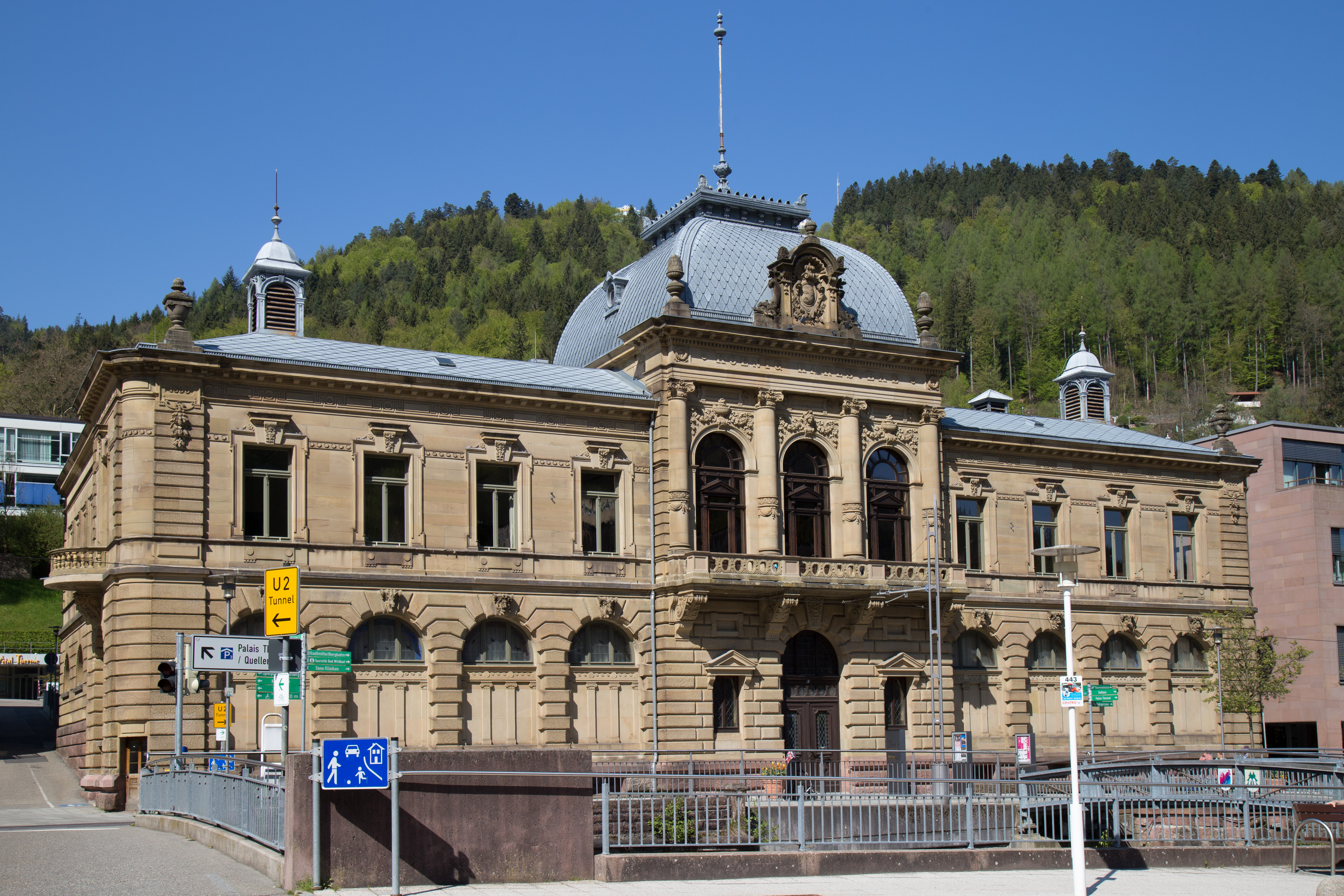
- Former names: Haus des Gastes

General information
- Type: Convention center
- Location: Bad Wildbad, Baden-Württemberg, Germany
- Coordinates: 48°44′58″N 8°32′59″E
- Construction started: 1880s
- Completed: 1889

The König-Karls-Bad is a spa building for bathing in Bad Wildbad in the Black Forest, Baden-Württemberg, Germany. Established in the 1880s, it was called Haus des Gastes (House of the guest) in 1977. It was rebuilt into a facility for conventions, called Forum König-Karls-Bad. It serves as a venue of the summer festival Rossini in Wildbad.

== History ==
The spa facilities of Bad Wildbad were used by growing numbers of visitors and became inadequate in the second half of the 19th century. The thermal baths were then the Graf-Eberhard-Bad, Kleines Bad and Katharinenstift, all using the hot springs to the right of the Enz.

In 1863, drillings on the left of the creek provided additional water, which was first stored in a reservoir over night and used during the day in the existing baths.

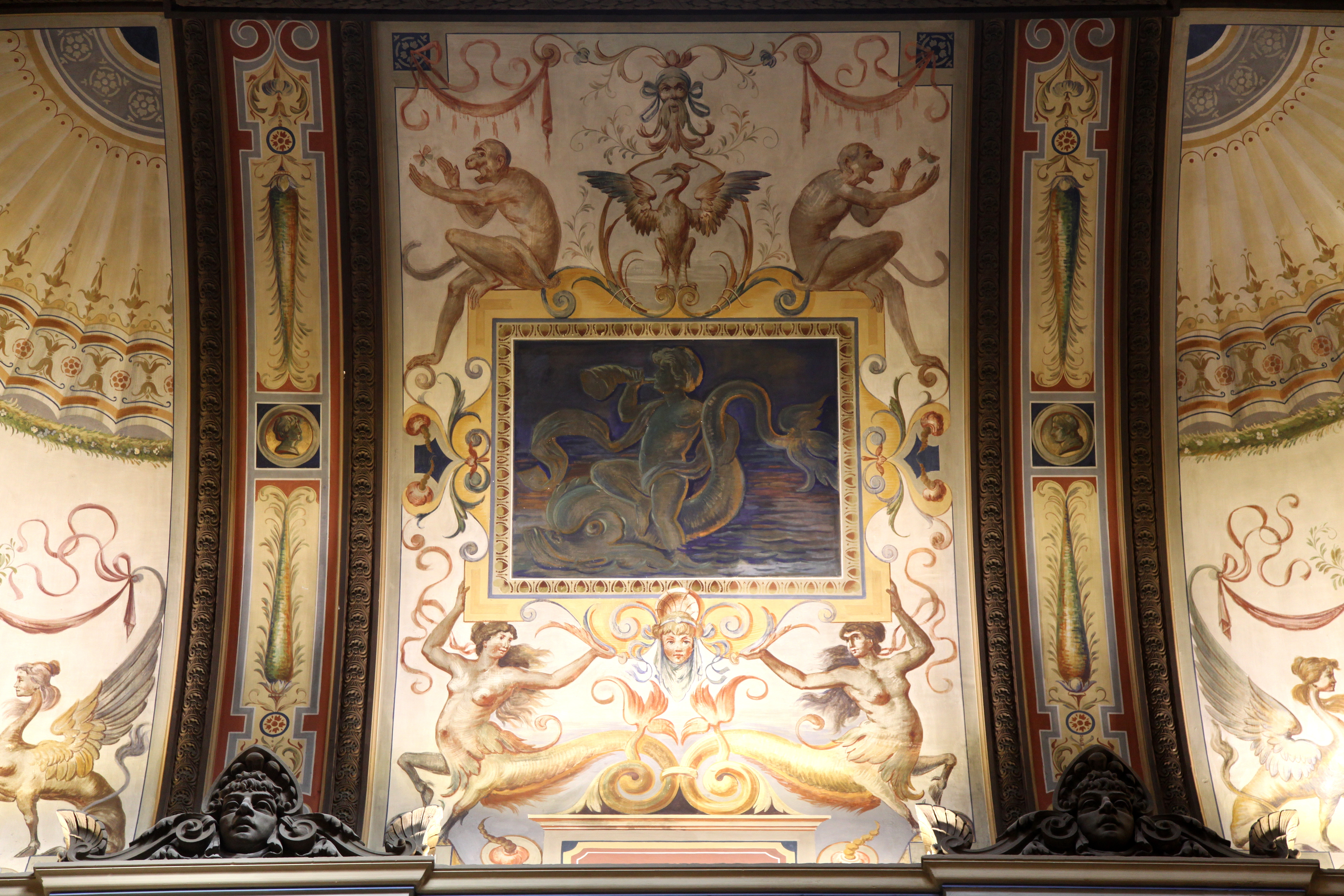
Ceiling above the drinking fountain

Wilhelm Theodor von Renz, a physician in the spa, was commissioned by Felix von Berner in 1876 to build a new bathing facility left of the Enz, on the grounds of a former garden. It was named after the ruling king, Karl of Württemberg.

=== First construction phase ===
From 1881, a system for the waterflow was interstalled between the pump station and the baths and the Alte Trinkhalle. During this time the König-Karl-Straße was developed along the Enz. The new bathing facility was a simple one-story with individual baths, a waiting hall and an open courtyard. A water tower was built on the hillside to supply the showers.

=== Second construction phase ===
From 1889, the building was expanded. The ground floor held communal baths, warm-air baths, hot-air baths, steam baths, and changing rooms. The upper floor offered a domed hall and function rooms.

Berner designed the building in Renaissance style with Baroque elements. The symmetrical facade to the street was styled as a centre risalit. The Coat of arms of Württemberg is present at the base of the cupola. The pedestal is clad in reddish sandstone and the rest of the facade in yellowish-grey sandstone.

The interiors were designed to be impressive. The vestibule features marble busts of the royal couple, Karl and Olga. The staircase and the domed hall are decorated by paintings by Hans von Kolb. The bathrooms were adorned with paintings and coloured stained-glass windows.

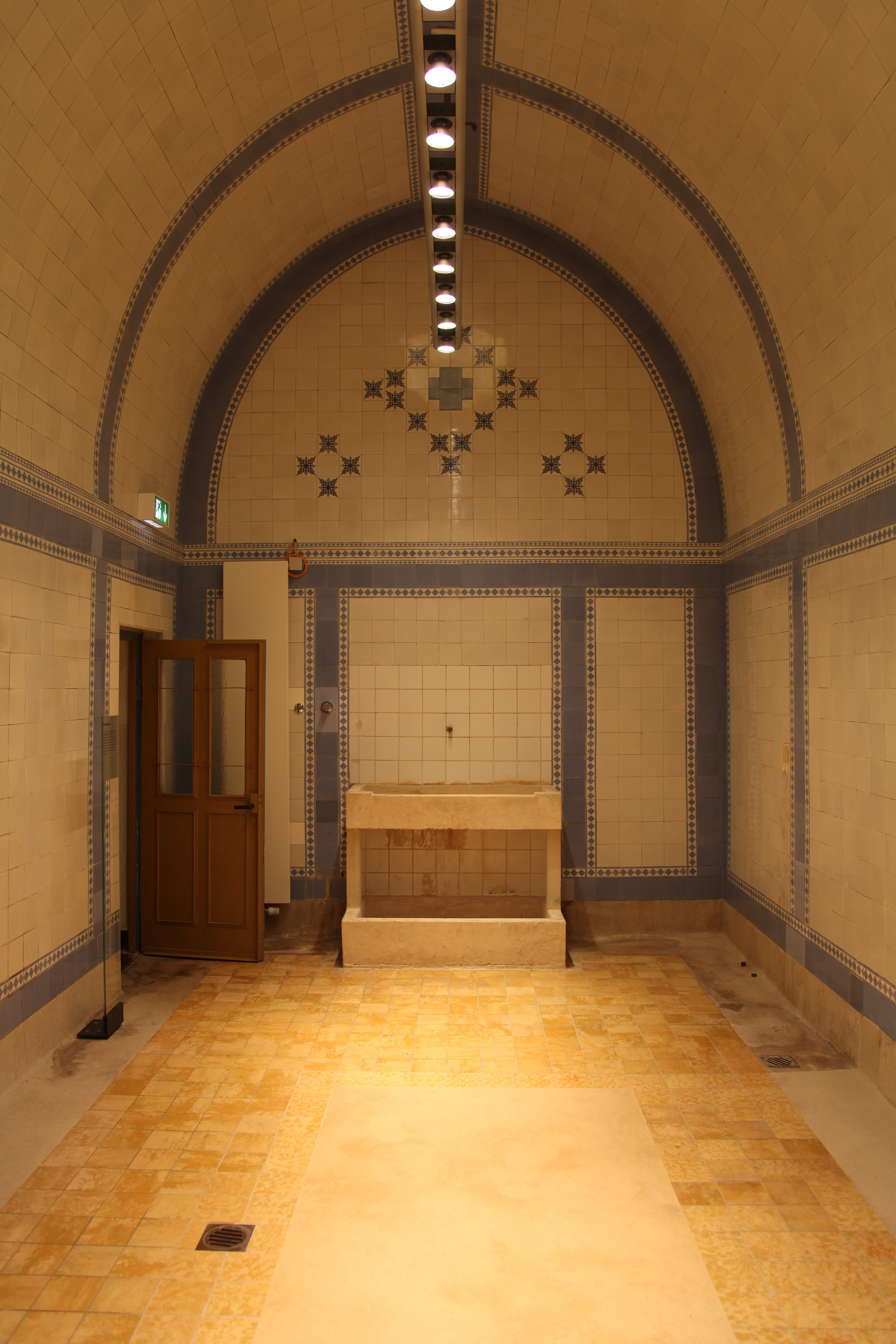
Steam bath

== Later use ==
The building became a listed monument in 1972. When the new Eberhardsbad was constructed in 1977, the bathing facilities of the König-Karls-Bad were no longer needed. It was transformed into the Haus des Gastes, with rooms for lectures, reading and events, and for a while with a cinema.

From 2010 bis 2012, the building was restored, including the interior decoration. Part of the historic bathrooms became a public museum. The great hall is used for Kurkonzert and some events of the Rossini in Wildbad festival. Improved fire safety and barrier-free access to both floors make the venue suitable for meetings and conferences.
