= Le cinesi (García) =

Opera by Manuel García

- Comic opera (chamber opera) by Manuel García
- Librettist: Metastasio
- Language: Italian
- Based on: Le cinesi by Pietro Metastasio

Le cinesi is a comic opera by Manuel García to a libretto by Metastasio originally set by Caldara in 1735, but best known in the setting by Gluck of 1754. The opera is one of five chamber operas which the singing teacher composed in 1830 and 1831 for his students, along with I tre gobbi, Il finto sordo, L'isola disabitala, and Un avvertimenlo ai gelosi. The chamber opera was revived for Rossini in Wildbad (2015), and again by the Fundación Juan March in Madrid (2017).

== Recording ==
- Le Cinesi Francesca Longari, Giada Frasconi, Ana Victoria Pitts, Patrick Kabongo Mubenga, Orchestra del Maggio Musicale Fiorentino, Michele d'Elia OF, DDD, 2016
