= Teresa Belloc-Giorgi =

Italian opera singer

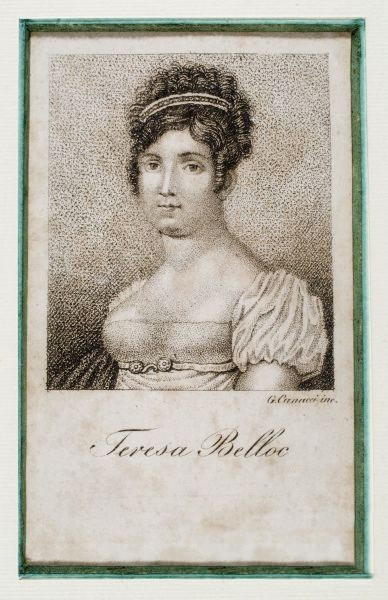
Teresa Belloc-Giorgi

Maria Teresa Belloc-Giorgi (Bellochi; Giorgi-Belloc; née Maria Teresa Ottavia Faustina Trombetta) (2 July 1784 – 13 May 1855) was an Italian contralto.

== Life and career ==
Maria Teresa Trombetta was born in San Benigno Canavese, and made her début in 1801 at Turin. She followed her debut with engagements in Parma and Trieste, and in 1803 appeared in Paris in the title roles of Giovanni Paisiello's Nina and Ferdinando Paer's Griselda.

In 1804, she first sang "Nina" at La Scala and continued to sing at the opera house for the next 20 years. She sang the title role in the revival of Simon Mayr's Medea in Corinto in 1823, and Isabella in the first performance of L'inganno felice in Venice in 1812. She favored Rossini roles and created Ninetta, a soprano part, in La gazza ladra at La Scala in 1817. However, the contralto roles of La Cenerentola, Tancredi, and Isabella in L'italiana in Algeri were her most successful roles.

In 1818, Belloc-Giorgi appeared in London under the name of Bellochi, but failed to find success and returned to Milan. She married a Frenchman and retired in 1828. She died in San Giorgio Canavese.
