= Giacomo Cordella =

Italian composer

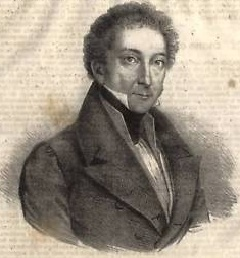
Giacomo Cordella

Giacomo Cordella (Naples, 25 July 1786 – Naples, 8 May 1847) was an Italian composer.

== Biography ==
Cordella studied in Naples with Fedele Fenaroli and Giovanni Paisiello. In 1804 he composed his first work, a cantata entitled La Vittoria dell'Arca contro Gerico. With the help of Paisiello in 1805 he had the possibility to produce in Venice his first opera, Il ciarlatano, which was appreciated for its comic verve and then performed in other cities in northern Italy, including Milan, Turin and Padua.

Cordella continued his activity mainly in Naples, where he was appreciated for his opere buffe, while his few opere serie met with failures. His greatest success was Una follia, first performed in 1813, an opera buffa featuring "a vivacious plot and a melody that flows agreeably". Cordella composed also sacred music.

== Works ==
=== Operas ===
Title	Genre	Subdivisions	Libretto	Première date	Theatre
Il ciarlatano, ossia I finti savoiardi	farsa giocosa	1 act	Luigi Buonavoglia	11 February 1805	Venice, Teatro San Moisè
L'albergatrice scaltra				27 June 1807	Naples, Teatro San Carlo
Annibale in Capua	dramma per musica	2 acts	Antonio Simeone Sografi (attribution uncertain)	21 October 1809	Naples, Teatro San Carlo
L'isola incantata	farsa	1 act		Summer 1809	Naples, Teatro Nuovo
Una follia	commedia per musica	2 acts	Andrea Leone Tottola	1813	Naples, Teatro dei Fiorentini
L'avaro	commedia per musica	2 acts	Giuseppe Palomba	Autumn 1814	Naples, Teatro dei Fiorentini
L'azzardo fortunato	commedia per musica	1 act	Andrea Leone Tottola	Carnival 1815	Naples, Teatro dei Fiorentini
La rappresaglia, ovvero Amore alla prova			Cesare Sterbini	26 December 1818	Rome, Teatro Valle
Il contraccambio	dramma giocoso	2 acts	Cesare Sterbini	Carnival 1819	Rome, Teatro Valle
Lo scaltro millantatore	commedia per musica	2 acts	Giuseppe Palomba	16 July 1819	Naples, Teatro Nuovo
Lo sposo di provincia	commedia per musica	2 acts	Giovanni Schmidt	29 September 1821	Rome, Teatro Argentina
Il castello degli invalidi	farsa	1 act		1823	Naples, Teatro Nuovo
Il frenetico per amore	melodramma	2 acts		Autumn 1824	Naples, Teatro Nuovo
Alcibiade	azione eroica	2 acts	Luigi Prividali	26 December 1824	Venice, Teatro La Fenice
Gli avventurieri	melodramma giocoso	2 acts	Felice Romani	6 September 1825	Milan, Teatro della Canobbiana
La bella prigioniera	opera buffa	2 acts		1826	Naples, Teatro del Fondo
Il marito disperato	commedia giocosa per musica	2 acts	Andrea Passaro, after a comedy with the same title by Giovanni Battista Lorenzi	Lent 1833	Naples, Teatro del Fondo
I due furbi	commedia per musica	2 acts	Giuseppe Palomba, revision by Andrea Passaro	16 July 1835	Naples, Teatro Nuovo
Matilde di Lanchefort	melodramma storico	2 acts	Andrea Passaro	Spring 1838	Naples, Teatro del Fondo
L'abitator delle rupi					
Le nozze campestri	dramma per musica	1 act	Giovanni Schmidt	30 May 1840	Naples, Teatro San Carlo

=== Other ===
- La vittoria dell'Arca contro Gerico, cantata, Naples, 1804
- Manfredi trovatore, cantata, Naples, Teatro San Carlo, 6 July 1836 (in collaboration with other composers)
- Il dono a Partenope, cantata, libretto by Giovanni Schmidt, Naples, Teatro San Carlo, 30 May 1840 (in collaboration with other composers)

Cordella composed many other works, including masses, motets and works for small ensembles.
