= Gianluigi Gelmetti =

Italian composer and conductor (1945–2021)

Gianluigi Gelmetti OMRI
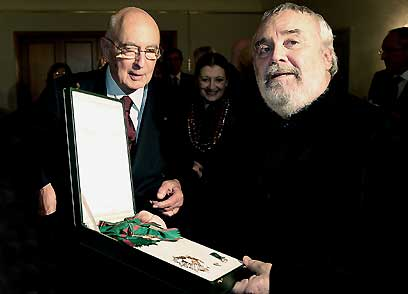
- Gelmetti, upon receiving the Order of Merit of the Italian Republic from President Giorgio Napolitano, 2008
- Born: 11 September 1945; Rome, Italy
- Died: 17 August 2021 (aged 75); Monaco
- Occupations: Conductor; Composer
- Organizations: Stuttgart Radio Symphony Orchestra; Teatro dell'Opera di Roma

Gianluigi Gelmetti (11 September 1945 – 11 August 2021) was an Italian-Monégasque conductor and composer.

== Early life ==
Gianluigi Gelmetti was born on 11 September 1945 in Rome. When 16 years old, Sergiu Celibidache let him conduct an orchestra, then took him as a pupil. He subsequently studied with Franco Ferrara and Hans Swarowsky. In 1967 he won the “Firenze” prize.

== Career ==
Following his debut with the Berlin Philharmonic Orchestra, Gelmetti regularly performed as a conductor at international opera houses, concert halls, and festivals. From 1989 to 1998 he was the Principal Conductor of the Stuttgart Radio Symphony Orchestra as well as the Schwetzingen Festival; and from 2000 to 2009, musical and artistic director of Teatro dell'Opera di Roma. From 2004 to 2008 he was the Principal Conductor and artistic director of the Sydney Symphony Orchestra. In 2012, he was appointed Principal Conductor of the Orchestre Philharmonique de Monte-Carlo, a post that he held until 2016. He was then named Chef Honoraire for life and was awarded the Monaco citizenship by H.S.H. Prince Albert II.

While at the Teatro dell'Opera di Roma he led some lesser-known or rediscovered lyric works; the world premiere of Lorenzo Ferrero's Marie Victoire (written in 1914 but never performed) and Marilyn (1980), RespighisLa fiamma (1933), Alfano's Sakùntala (1921); and Mascagnis's Iris (1898). He notably conducted Mozart’s Don Giovanni, Le nozze di Figaro (earning him the "Best Conductor of the Year" prize from Opernwelt), Così fan tutte and The Magic Flute. Among other works he conducted Francesca da Rimini, Wagner's Das Rheingold and Verdi's Falstaff in Monte-Carlo; Rossini's William Tell in Zürich, Monte-Carlo and Paris; Verdi's La forza del destino and Attila in Parma; Les vêpres siciliennes in Naples; Puccini's Turandot in Tokyo; Rossini's The Barber of Seville and I due Foscari in Toulouse; Verdi's Un ballo in maschera, La traviata in Trieste; La fanciulla del West and Puccini's Tosca in Liège; Rossini's Stabat Mater in Sarajevo. He led a video production of Rossini's La Cenerentola directed by Carlo Verdone for Rada Film and Verdi's Messa da Requiem in Rome.

In Pesaro, Italy, at the end of last century, Gelmetti conducted several productions at the Rossini Opera Festival: Tancredi, La gazza ladra, Otello, Maometto II, He was awarded the Rossini d’Oro for William Tell, a world premiere of the complete opera lasting over five hours.

Apart from opera, he regularly conducted symphonic concerts in Germany (Berlin, Bonn, Hamburg, Stuttgart, Munich, Cologne, Dresden, Leipzig); in France (Paris, Toulouse, Bordeaux, Lyon) in Spain (Madrid, Bilbao), in Italy; also the Czech Philharmonic, the Vienna Philharmonic, the London Symphony Orchestra in the UK, the St. Petersburg Philharmonic, the Qatar Philharmonic Orchestra, Sofia Philharmonic, in Copenhagen, in Oslo. He was also seen performing in China and Oman. He is very much appreciated in Japan, where he conducted the NHK Symphony Orchestra, the Yomiuri Nippon Symphony Orchestra and the Japan Philharmonic Orchestra. He was awarded the Tokyo critics’ prize “Best Performance of the Year” for Symphony No. 9 (Beethoven).

His discography, released on labels including EMI, Sony, RICORDI, FONIT, DECCA, TELDEC, NAXOS and AGORÀ, spans operas by Rossini, Puccini and Mozart; orchestral works by Ravel; symphonies by Mozart; and works by Stravinsky, Berg, Webern, Varèse and Nino Rota. Recent releases include two rarely performed Rossini operas and Anton Bruckner’s Symphony No. 6.

Gelmetti also composed music. He wrote "In Paradisum Deducant Te Angeli", which premiered in Rome and later performed in London, Munich, Frankfurt, Budapest, Sydney and Stuttgart; "Algos" for a large orchestra, premiered in 1997 by the Münchner Philharmoniker and "Prasanta Atma", commissioned in 1999 to celebrate Sergiu Celibidache. More recently, the Teatro Comunale di Bologna commissioned him the "Cantata della Vita" for choir, cello solo and orchestra.

He taught conducting at the Accademia Musicale Chigiana in Siena and at the Accademia Nazionale di Santa Cecilia in Rome.

== Personal life ==
Gelmetti was created a Knight of the Order of the Arts and the Letters of France, Commander of the Order of Cultural Merit of Monaco, and Knight of Grand-Cross of the Order of Merit of the Italian Republic of Italy.

He died in Monaco on 11 August 2021, at the age of 75.

== Partial discography ==
- Berg-Stravinsky-Ravel: Violin Concertos – Frank Peter Zimmermann Radio-Sinfonieorchester Stuttgart (EMI) (CD)
- Donizetti: Les martyrs Gencer/Bruson/Garaventa/Furlanetto Orch. Teatro La Fenice (CD)
- Mascagni: Iris Dessì/Cura/Servile/Ghiaurov Orchestra del Teatro dell'Opera di Roma (Ricordi) (CD)
- Mozart: Symphony No. 40 / Sinfonia Concertante – Frank Peter Zimmermann, Radio-Sinfonie-Orchester Stuttgart (EMI) (CD)
- Mozart: Die Entführung aus dem Serail Swenson/Blochwitz/Rydl Radio-Sinfonieorchester Stuttgart (EuroArts) (DVD)
- Piccinni: La Buona Figliola E.Ravaglia/Lucia Aliberti/Margherita Rinaldi/R.Baldisseri/Ugo Benelli Orchestra del Teatro dell'Opera di Roma (FONIT-Cetra)
- Puccini: La Bohème Dessì/Sabbatini/Scarabelli/Gavanelli/Colombara Orchestra del Teatro Comunale Bologna (EMI) (CD)
- Puccini: La Rondine Gasdia/Cupido/Cosotti/Scarabelli Orchestra RAI Milano (FONIT-Cetra) (CD)
- Rossini: Overtures Radio-Sinfonie-Orchester Stuttgart (EMI) (CD)
- Rossini: Il signor Bruschino Corbelli/Felle/Kuebler/Rinaldi Radio-Sinfonieorchester Stuttgart (EuroArts) (DVD)
- Rossini: L’occasione fa il ladro Patterson/Gambill/De Carolis/Bacelli Radio-Sinfonieorchester Stuttgart (EuroArts) (DVD)
- Rossini: La cambiale di matrimonio Del Carlo/Hall/Kuebler/Rinaldi Radio-Sinfonieorchester Stuttgart (EuroArts) (DVD)
- Rossini: La scala di seta Serra/Kuebler/Corbelli/Rinaldi Radio-Sinfonieorchester Stuttgart (EuroArts) (DVD)
- Rossini: Tancredi Manca di Nissa/Bayo/Giménez/D’Arcangelo Radio-Sinfonieorchester Stuttgart (Arthaus) (DVD)
- Rossini: Tancredi Barcellona/Takova/Filianoti/Polverelli Orchestra regionale della Toscana ORT (Ricordi) (CD)
- Rossini: La gazza ladra Ricciarelli/Matteuzzi/Ramey/Manca di Nissa RAI Orchestra (Sony) (CD)
- Rossini: Maometto II Gasdia/Pertusi/Scalchi/Vargas/Piccoli Radio-Sinfonieorchester Stuttgart (Ricordi) (CD)
- Rossini: Il barbiere di Siviglia Bayo/Flórez/Spagnoli/Praticò/Raimondi Orchestra of Teatro Real Madrid (DECCA) (DVD)
- Rossini: Il barbiere di Siviglia Hampson/Mentzer/Hadley/Praticò/Ramey Orchestra regionale della Toscana ORT (EMI) (CD)
- Rossini: Eduardo e Cristina Polverelli/Dalla Benetta/Tarver Virtuosi Brunensis (NAXOS) (CD)
- Rossini: Zelmira Dalla Benetta/Comparato/Stewart/Süngü/Dall’Amico Virtuosi Brunensis (NAXOS) (CD)
- Rossini: Stabat Mater Flórez/Barcellona/Remigio/D’Arcangelo Orchestra regionale della Toscana ORT (Agorà) (CD)
- Rota: Film music Orchestre Philharmonique de Monte-Carlo (EMI) (CD)
- Salieri: Les Danaïdes Marshall/Giménez/Kavrakos/Cossutta Radio-Sinfonie-Orchester Stuttgart (EMI) (CD)
- Verdi: Un ballo in maschera Meli/Stoyanov/Lewis Orchestra del Teatro Regio di Parma (CMajor) (DVD)
- Verdi: La forza del destino Theodossiou/Stoyanov/Pentcheva/Machado/Scandiuzzi Orchestra del Teatro Regio di Parma (CMajor) (DVD)
- Verdi: Messa di Requiem – Rossini: Stabat Mater – Scalchi/Mazzaria/Dessì/Merritt/Ballo/Scandiuzzi Radio-Sinfonieorchester Stuttgart (Serenissima) (CD)
