= Cesare Sterbini =

Italian writer and librettist

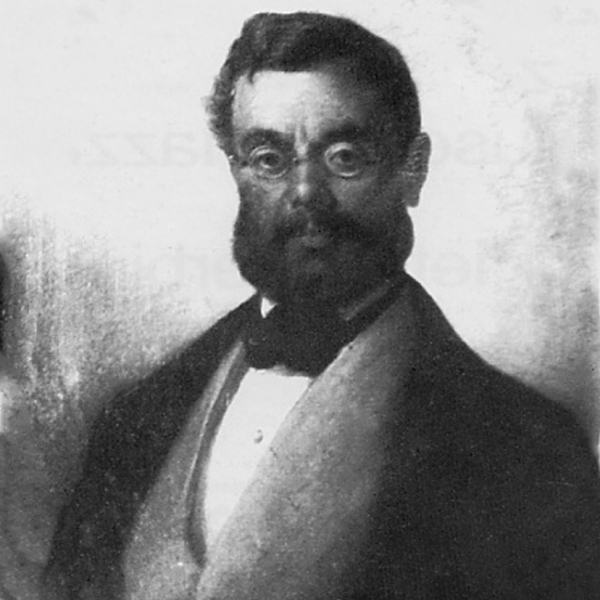
Cesare Sterbini

Cesare Sterbini (1784 – 19 January 1831) was an Italian writer and librettist.

Possessing a deep knowledge of classical and contemporary culture, philosophy, linguistics, he was fluent in Greek, Latin, Italian, French and German. He is best known as the librettist for two operas by Gioachino Rossini: Torvaldo e Dorliska (1815) and The Barber of Seville (1816). An official in the Pontifical Administration, he also set poetry to music as an amateur. He wrote the libretto to the opera Il Contraccambio to the music of Giacomo Cordella in 1819, and the opera Isaura and Ricciardo to the music of Francesco Basili in 1820.

He died in Rome on 19 January 1831.

== Libretti ==
- Paolo e Virginia, cantata, music by Vincenzo Migliorucci (1812)
- Torvaldo e Dorliska, dramma semiserio, music by Gioachino Rossini (1815).
- The Barber of Seville, opera buffa, music by Gioachino Rossini (1816). The libretto was also set to music by Costantino Dall'Argine (1868), Giuseppe Graffigna (1879) and Alberto Torazza (1924)
- Il credulo deluso, dramma giocoso, music by Giovanni Tadolini (1817)
- Il contraccambio, dramma giocoso, music by Giacomo Cordella (1819). Set to music as La rappresaglia by Joseph Hartmann Stuntz (1819), Johann Nepomuk Poissl (1820), Francesco Cianciarelli (1822) and Saverio Mercadante (1829)
- Il gabbamondo, dramma giocoso, music by Pietro Generali (1819)
- Isaura e Ricciardo, dramma per musica, music by Francesco Basili (1820)
