= Filippo Galli (bass) =

Italian opera singer 1783-1853

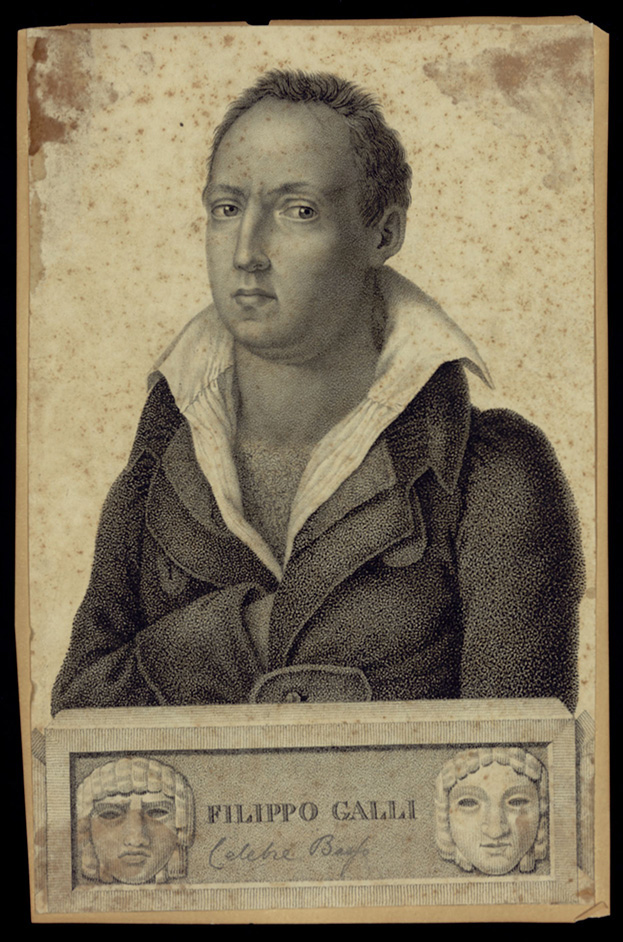
Portrait of Filippo Galli

Filippo Galli (1783 – 3 June 1853, in Paris) was an Italian opera singer who began his career as a tenor in 1801 but went on to become one of the most acclaimed basses of the bel canto era, with a voice known for its wide range, extreme agility, and expressivity, and a remarkable gift for acting.

== Early life ==
Born in Rome, Galli was a marginal buffo tenor, appearing in Naples, Bologna, Parma, and Turin, primarily in the works of Nasolini, Generali, and Zingarelli. It is said that following an illness in 1810, his voice changed markedly into that of a bass, but this may have been a cover story for his technical transition into the bass repertoire upon the advice of the composer Giovanni Paisiello or singer Luigi Marchesi. Galli's younger brother Vincenzo was also an opera singer noted for his performances in basso buffo roles.

== Career as bass ==
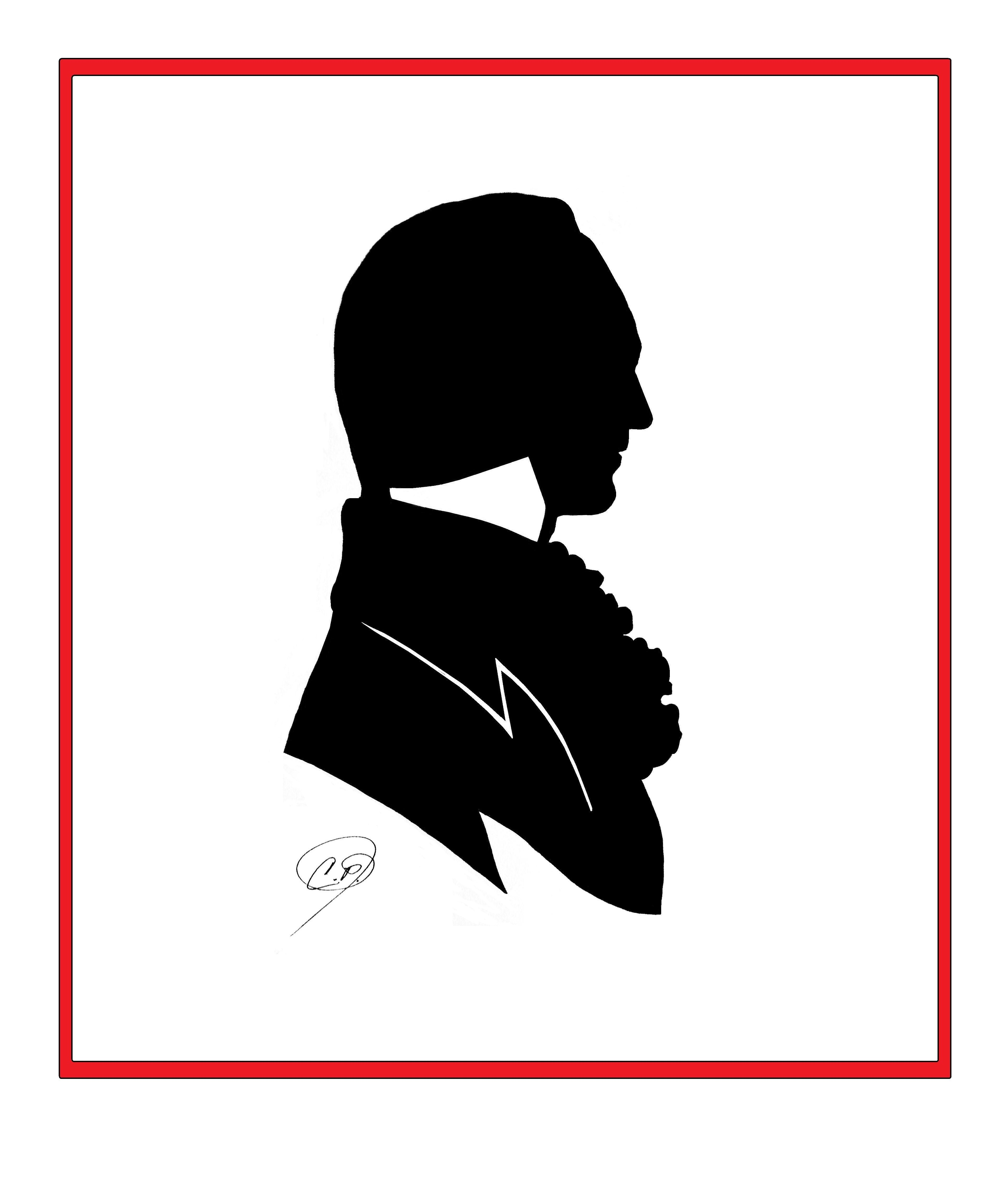
Fillipo Galli in an old fashion drawing by Carlos Fuentes y Espinosa, after Gioacchino Rossini´s original design

His new career took root in 1812: his meeting with Rossini allowed him to sing L'inganno felice on 1 August at the Teatro San Moisè, Venice (in the role of Tarabotto). After his creation of Polidoro in Pietro Generali's La vedova stravagante, he appeared in a new opera by Rossini—La pietra del paragone on 26 September 1812. His performance in the "Sigillara" aria was the hit of the immensely successful opera. His collaboration with Rossini increased: on 22 May 1813, he sang Mustafà in the premiere of L'italiana in Algeri at the Teatro San Benedetto in Venice. Rossini then composed numerous other bass parts specifically for Galli. On 14 August 1814, he appeared in Il turco in Italia at La Scala; on 31 May 1817 (again at La Scala), in the very difficult role of Fernando in La gazza ladra. The title role in Maometto II followed on 3 December 1820 at the Teatro di San Carlo, Naples, plus, on 3 February 1823, he sang the role of Assur in Semiramide at La Fenice in Venice.

Galli also created the role of Enrico (Henry) VIII in Donizetti's Anna Bolena at the Teatro Carcano in Milan.

== Repertoire ==
This is an alphabetical list of Filippo Galli's roles:

- Adolfo, in Carlo Coccia's La donna selvaggia
- Adolfo, in Carlo Evasio Soliva's La testa di bronzo o sia La capanna solitaria
- Assur, in Gioachino Rossini's Semiramide
- Batone, in Gioachino Rossini's L'inganno felice
- Conte Asdrubale, in Gioachino Rossini's La pietra del paragone
- Dandini, in Stefano Pavesi's Agatina ovvero La virtù premiata
- Dandini, in Gioachino Rossini's La Cenerentola
- Don Giovanni, in Wolfgang Amadeus Mozart's Don Giovanni
- Duca d'Ordowo, in Gioachino Rossini's Torvaldo e Dorliska
- Elpino, in Gioachino Rossini's 1822 cantata Il vero omaggio
- Enrico VIII, in Gaetano Donizetti's Anna Bolena
- Fernando Villabella, in Gioachino Rossini's La gazza ladra
- Figaro, in Wolfgang Amadeus Mozart's Le nozze di Figaro
- Gabriel, in François-Adrien Boieldieu's La dama bianca
- Geronimo, in Domenico Cimarosa's Il matrimonio segreto
- Giove, in Vittorio Trento's Andromeda
- Gondair, in Giovanni Pacini's Gli arabi nelle Gallie
- Ircano, in Gioachino Rossini's Ricciardo e Zoraide
- Maometto II, by Gioachino Rossini
- Mercurio, in Pietro Casella's Paride
- Mustafà, in Gioachino Rossini's L'italiana in Algeri
- Oroveso, in Vincenzo Bellini's Norma
- Papageno, in Wolfgang Amadeus Mozart's Die Zauberflöte
- Podesta di Firenze, in Giovanni Pacini's Isabella ed Enrico
- Polidoro, in Pietro Generali's La vedova stravagante
- Raimondo, in Ramon Carnicer's Adele di Lusignano
- Richard, in Joseph Weigl's La famiglia svizzera
- Selim, in Gioachino Rossini's Il turco in Italia
- Teodoro, in Giovanni Pacini's Il Barone di Dolsheim

== Sources ==
- Warrack, John and West, Ewan (1992), The Oxford Dictionary of Opera, 782 pages, ISBN 0-19-869164-5
