= Königliches Kurtheater =

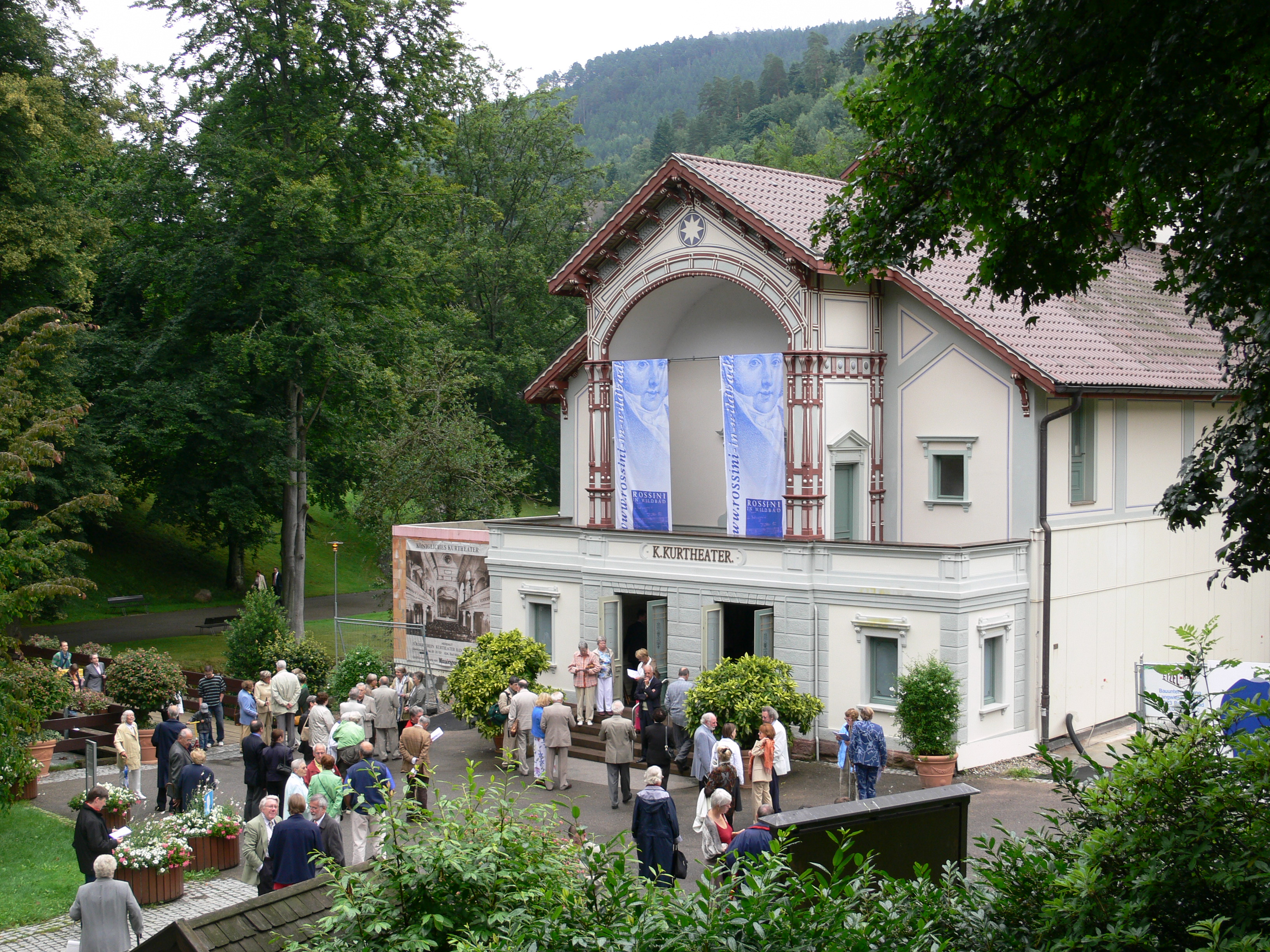
- The theatre in 2008

General information
- Type: Theatre
- Location: Bad Wildbad, Baden-Württemberg, Germany
- Coordinates: 48.747044°N 8.548946°E
- Construction started: 1864
- Renovated: 2001

Website
- www.kurtheater.com

The Königliches Kurtheater (Royal spa theatre) is a theatre in the spa town Bad Wildbad, Baden-Württemberg, Germany. First built in 1864, it was expanded 1897. After a period of deterioration, it was restored from 2001 to be used by the Rossini in Wildbad festival. Restoration was completed in 2014.

== History ==
Visitors to the spa of Wildbad were entertained by theatre from the 18th century, with performances at various locations. When the Badhotel was completed, theatre was performed at its Konversationssaal. In 1864 a simple theatre was built in the spa park, where performances could be held in summer. In the mid-1880s, theatre director Peter Liebig initiated an expansion. The theater was called Königliches Kurtheater from 1888. It was expanded from 1897, designed by Albert von Beger: the main facade was given a stately porch, the interior was decorated in Neo-Baroque style, and two galleries were installed, to seat around 200 spectators.

At the beginning of the 20th century, a set extension was added to the stage house. In 1977 the Landesamt für Denkmalpflege Baden-Württemberg, the state office for the preservation of historical monuments, classified the theatre as a cultural monument of particular significance "on account of its scholarly and documentary value and its artistic merit". The Denkmalstiftung Baden-Württemberg recognised it as monument of the month in October 2007.

== Usage ==
In the 1960s, theatre use ended, and the building was used for storage and fell into disrepair. In 1981, the roof had to be tightened and parts of the interior fittings be removed to halt further deterioration.

In 1987, a group of committed local residents founded an association, Kurtheater Wildbad, campaigning for the restoration and reopening of the theatre. It needed to address funding but also usage. The Rossini in Wildbad festival for bel canto opera was launched in 1989 and has been held annually, devoted to works by Rossini and his contemporaries, because Rossini had used the spa in 1856. The festival had first to use other locations.

The Rechnungshof Baden-Württemberg (state court of auditors, 1997) and the finance committee of the Landtag of Baden-Württemberg (1998) recommended the demolition of the theatre, but the association purchased the building in a transaction completed in 1999. Renovation began in 2001. In three construction phases, the foundations were stabilised, the roof structure repaired and the façade restored in accordance with historical plans. Inside, the auditorium, foyer and stage tower were restored, including the historic stage machinery, and extensions were refurbished. The costs, amounting to around 4 million euros, were shared by the state of Baden-Württemberg, the Baden-Württemberg Heritage Foundation, the Deutsche Stiftung Denkmalschutz, the town of Bad Wildbad, the association and other sponsors.

The theatre could be used again from 2005. Further restoration work was completed in 2014, and it was inaugurated on 10 July 2014 by a concert performance of Rossini's Il viaggio a Reims.
