= La gazza ladra =

1817 opera by Gioachino Rossini

- Opera semiseria by Gioachino Rossini
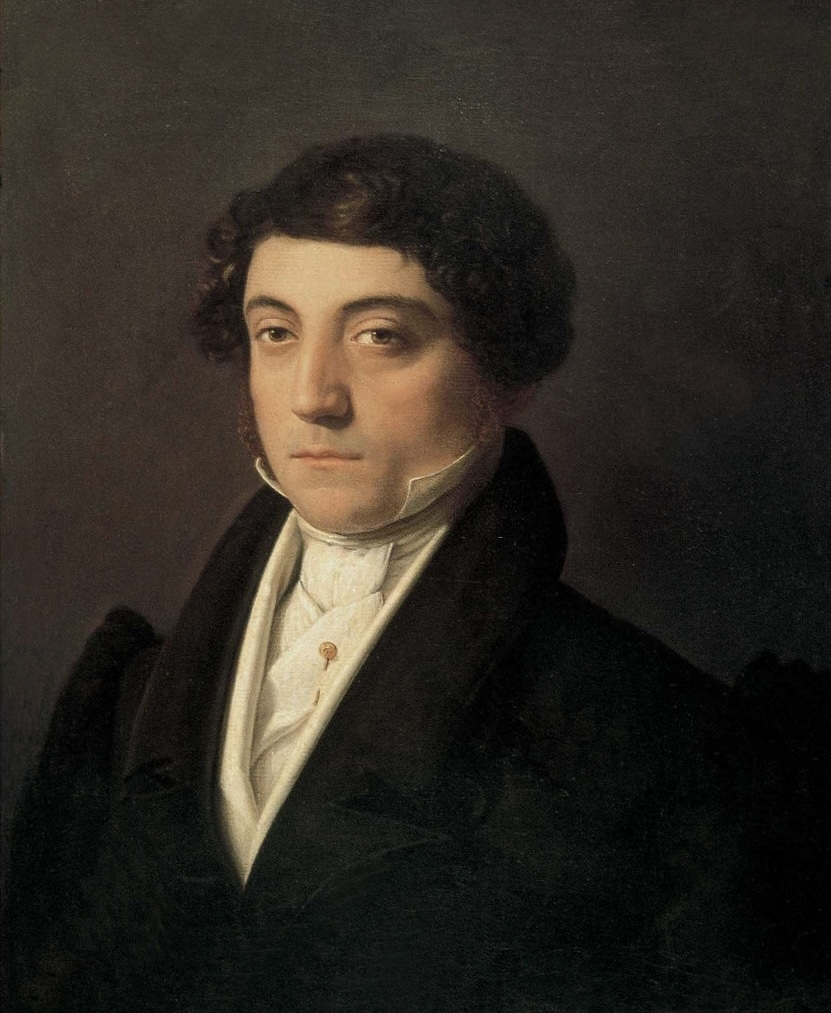
- Portrait of the composer
- Translation: The Thieving Magpie
- Librettist: Giovanni Gherardini
- Language: Italian
- Based on: La pie voleuse by Théodore Baudouin d'Aubigny and Louis-Charles Caigniez
- Premiere: 31 May 1817; La Scala, Milan

La gazza ladra (Italian pronunciation: [la ˈɡaddza ˈlaːdra], The Thieving Magpie) is a opera semiseria in two acts by Gioachino Rossini, with a libretto by Giovanni Gherardini based on La pie voleuse by Théodore Baudouin d'Aubigny and Louis-Charles Caigniez. The Thieving Magpie's overture uses snare drums to evoke the image of the opera's main subject: a devilishly clever, thieving magpie.

Rossini wrote quickly, and La gazza ladra was no exception. A 19th-century biography quotes him as saying that the conductor of the premiere performance locked him in a room at the top of La Scala the day before the premiere with orders to complete the opera's still unfinished overture. He was under the guard of four stagehands whose job it was to toss each completed page out the window to the copyist below.

== Performance history ==
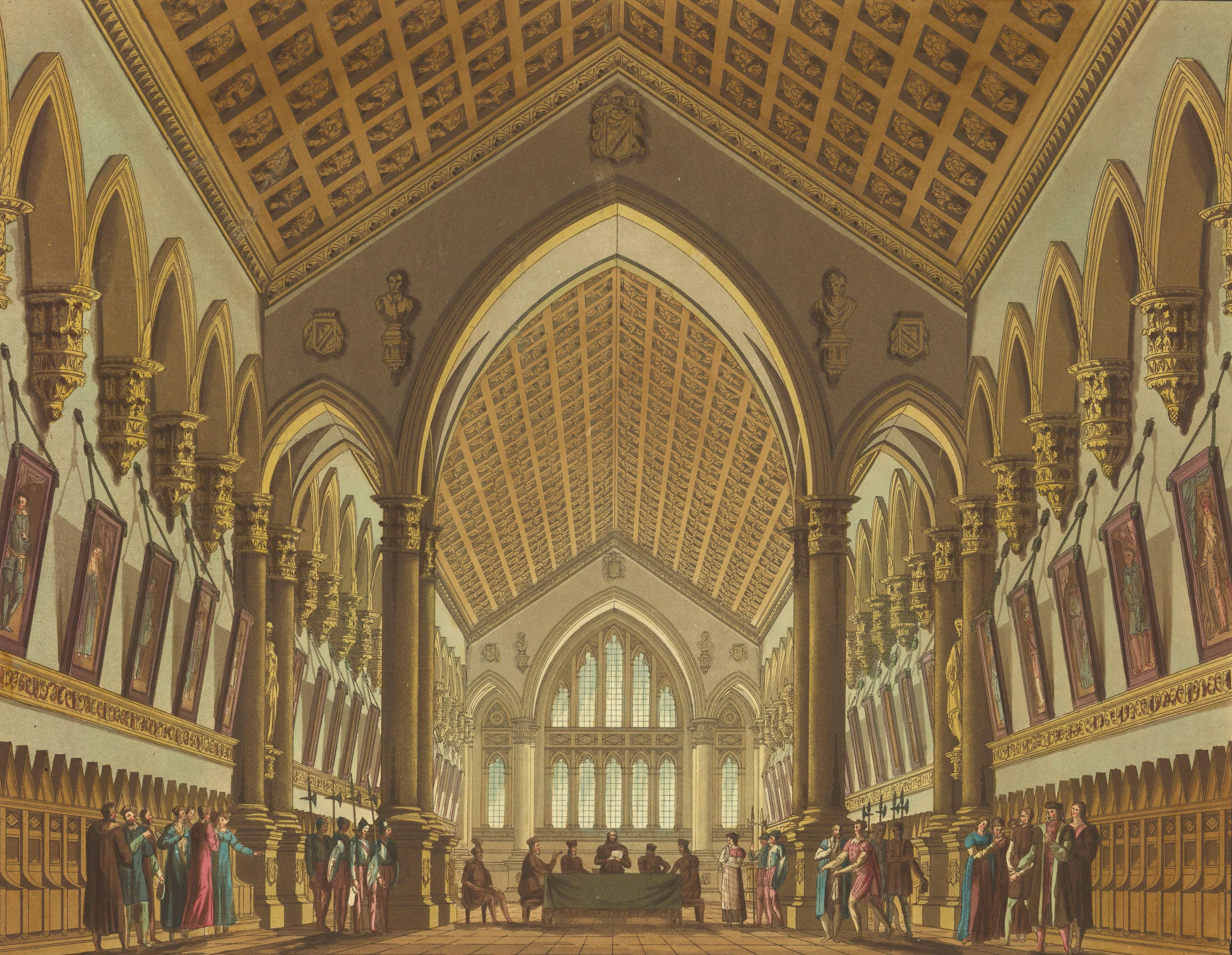
Decor by Alessandro Sanquirico for the 1817 La Scala performance.

The first performance of The Thieving Magpie was on 31 May 1817, at La Scala, Milan. In 1818, Rossini revised the opera for subsequent productions in Pesaro; and then in 1819 for the Teatro del Fondo, in Naples; in 1820 for the Teatro di San Carlo, in Naples; and in 1866 he revised the music for performance in Paris. The 1866 revision included embellishments and variations written specifically for Giuseppina Vitali, who was singing the role of Ninetta. He revised the role again in 1867 with embellishments and cadenzas for Adelina Patti.

The first performance of The Thieving Magpie in England was at the King's Theatre, London, on 10 March 1821. A French-language opera-comique using the original title of the French source material (La pie voleuse) in a version translated by Castil-Blaze was premiered in Lille, France, on 15 October 1822. The French-language version's first performance in the United States was at the Théâtre d'Orléans, New Orleans, on 30 December 1824.

In 1941, Riccardo Zandonai composed a version of The Thieving Magpie for a revival of the opera in Pesaro. In 1979, Alberto Zedda edited Rossini's original composition of the opera for publication by the Fondazione Rossini. In 2013, the Bronx Opera of New York City performed an English-language version of La gazza ladra.

== Roles ==
Role	Voice type	Premiere Cast, 31 May 1817 (Conductor: Alessandro Rolla)
Ninetta, Fabrizio’s servant	soprano	Teresa Belloc-Giorgi
Fabrizio Vingradito, a rich farmer	bass	Vincenzo Botticelli
Lucia, his wife	mezzo-soprano	Marietta Castiglioni
Giannetto, his son, a soldier	tenor	Savino Monelli
Fernando Villabella, Ninetta’s father, a soldier	bass-baritone	Filippo Galli
Gottardo the Podestà, village mayor	bass	Antonio Ambrosi
Pippo, a young peasant, employed by Fabrizio	contralto	Teresa Gallianis
Giorgio, servant to the mayor	bass	Paolo Rosignoli
Isacco, a peddler	tenor	Francesco Biscottini
Antonio, the gaoler	tenor	Francesco Biscottini
Ernesto, a soldier, friend of Fernando	bass	Alessandro De Angeli

== Synopsis ==
=== Act 1 ===
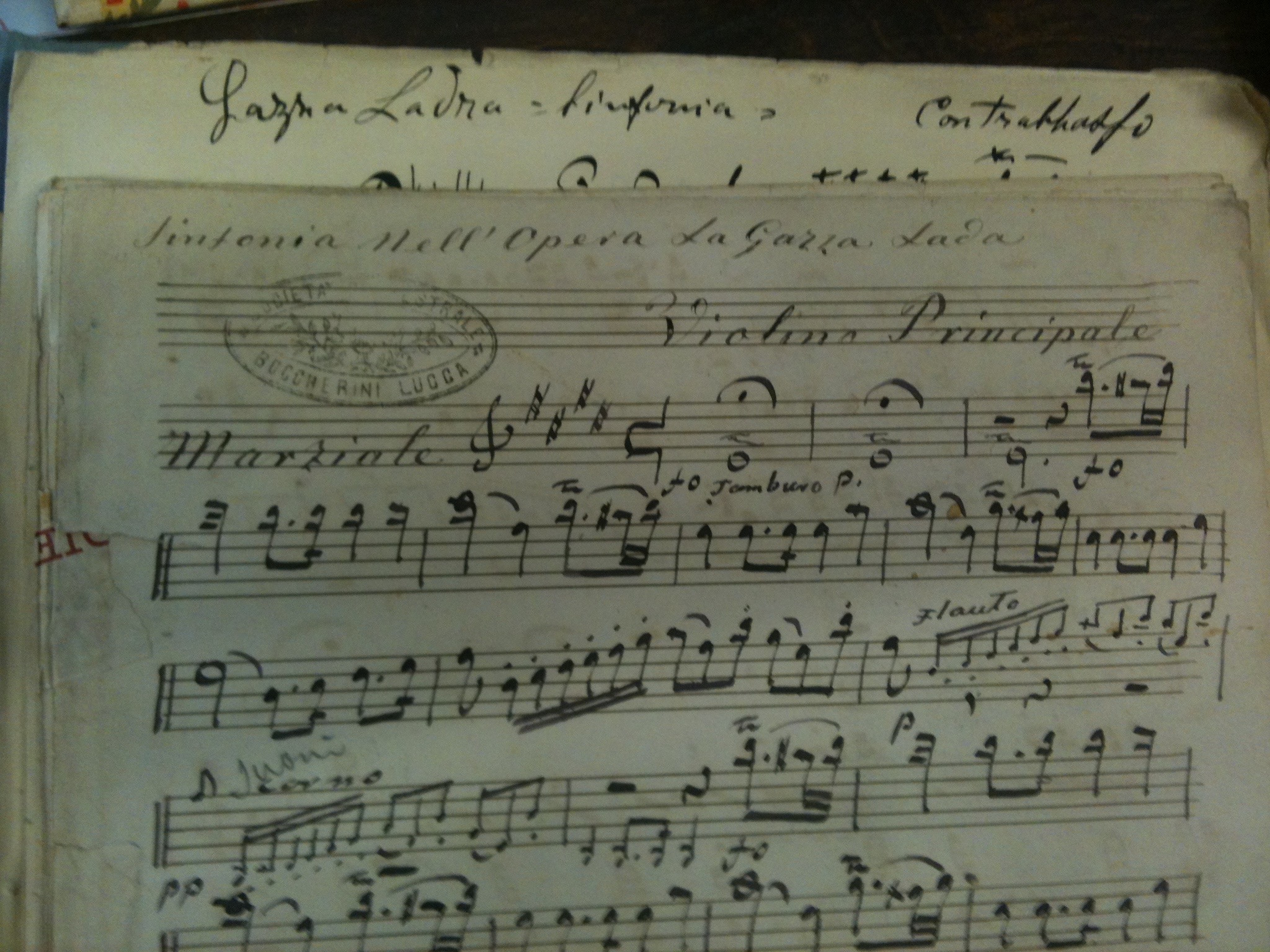
Part of the manuscript for La gazza ladra.

At the house of Fabrizio Vingradito and his wife Lucia there is full of joy due to the imminent return of their son Giannetto from the war. One of the servants, Ninetta, is in love with Giannetto and all want the two to marry, except Lucia, who blames Ninetta for the recent loss of a silver fork. Isacco, a local peddler, visits and asks about Ninetta, but Pippo, Fabrizio's manservant, sends him away. Giannetto arrives and goes inside with Lucia while Ninetta prepares for the party. Once they have gone, Ninetta's father, Fernando Villabella, arrives, also from the war. However, he was sentenced to death after fighting with his captain and is now a deserter. He asks his daughter to sell two pieces of family silver to go towards his expenses while he is on the run. The Mayor arrives with intent on seducing Ninetta, and she claims that her father is just some vagrant. The Mayor's assistant delivers the arrest warrant for a deserter (Fernando), but as the Mayor has forgotten his reading glasses, Ninetta is asked to read the warrant, and makes up a description of someone totally unlike her father. The Mayor continues to force his attentions on Ninetta, at which Fernando almost reveals himself in anger. The three leave, and a magpie flies down and steals one of Lucia's silver spoons.

Isacco passes by again, and Ninetta sells him the silver her father had entrusted to her. Giannetto and others return, and Lucia notices that a spoon is missing. The Mayor starts an immediate investigation, stating the draconian penalty for domestic theft: death. Lucia and the Mayor accuse Ninetta, who in her distress drops the money she had exchanged from Isacco. The peddler is brought back and reports that he has already sold the spoon, but he recalls the inscription "F.V.", initials shared by Fabrizio and Fernando. The stunned Ninetta, desperate to protect her father, is unable to refute the accusations, and the Mayor orders her arrest.

=== Act 2 ===
Antonio, the prison warder, takes pity on Ninetta and says that he will get a message to Pippo and let Giannetto visit her. Ninetta convinces Giannetto that she is innocent. The Mayor now arrives and tells Ninetta that if she accepts his advances he will get her freed – she replies that she would rather die. The Mayor is called away, but Antonio has heard all and offers to help Ninetta any way he can. Ninetta asks Pippo to sell a gold cross and put some money for her father in an agreed hiding place – a chestnut tree. Ninetta is brought to trial, found guilty, and condemned to death. Fernando rushes to the court to save his daughter's life, but is too late; he too is sent to prison.

Ernesto, a military friend of Fernando, bursts in looking for the Mayor and holding a royal pardon for Ninetta's father. Pippo shows him the way and is given a silver coin for helping, but the magpie snatches it and flies up to the tower. Pippo and Antonio pursue the thief.

Ninetta is taken to the scaffold and makes her final speech to the crowd. From the tower, Pippo and Antonio cry out that they have found Lucia's silver in the magpie's nest and they ring the bells. The crowd hear their words and hope to save Ninetta, but shots ring out and they conclude that they are too late. However, Ninetta appears walking down the hill – the shots were mere rejoicing. Ninetta celebrates with her companions but is worried about her father. He then appears with Ernesto and all – except the Mayor – enjoy a happy ending.

== Arias ==
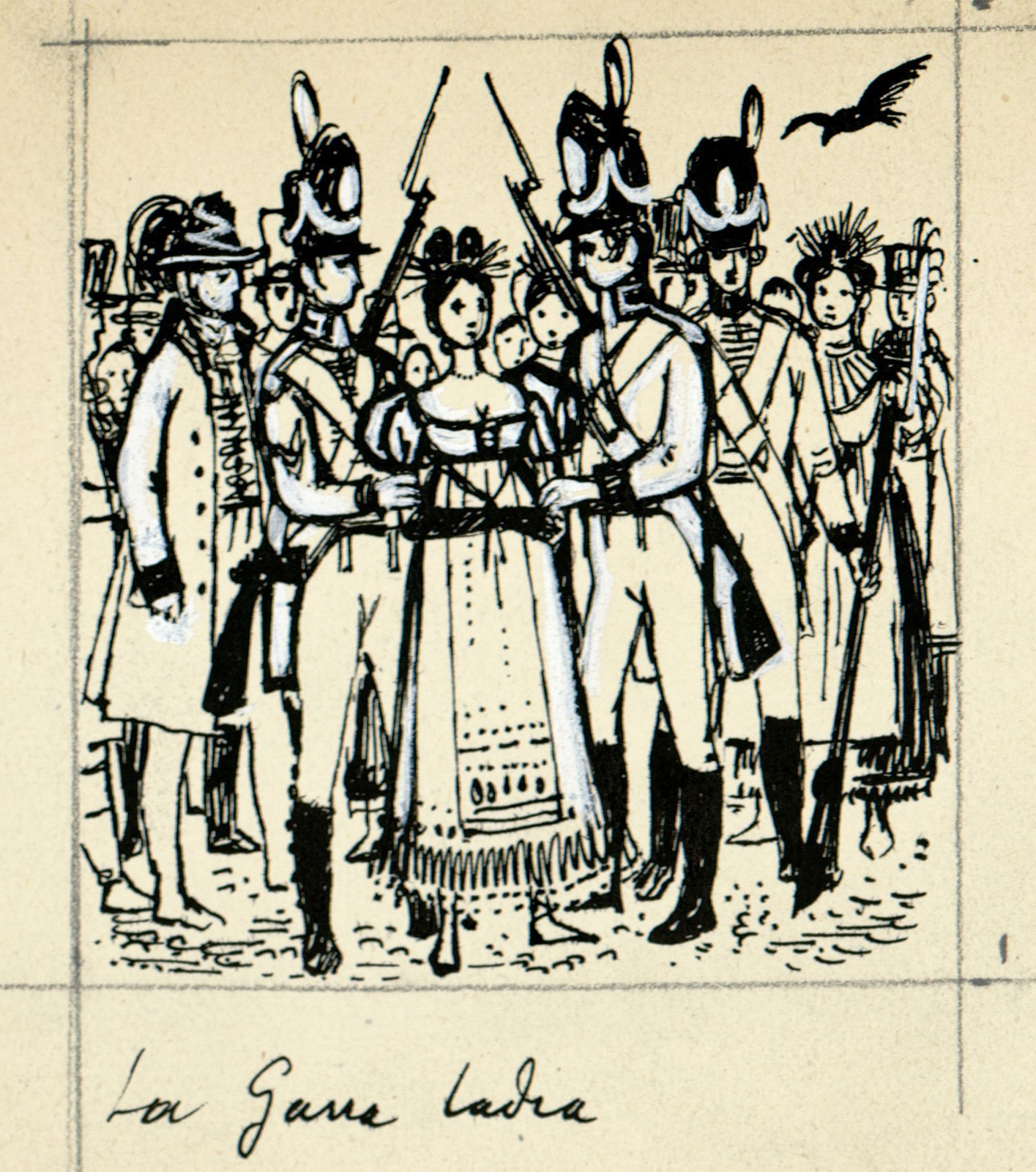
Peter Hoffer's 20th century cover design for the libretto

The most famous aria in the opera is probably Ninetta's prayer "Deh, tu reggi in tal momento". The soprano cavatina "Di piacer mi balza il cor" and the tenor cavatina "Vieni fra queste braccia" (the cabaletta for the duet between Arturo and Elvira from Bellini's I Puritani starts with exactly the same words) are two examples of Rossini's brilliant vocal writing.

== Act One ==
- Cavatina – Di piacer mi balza il cor (Ninetta)
- Cavatina – Stringhe e ferri – Isacco
- Cavatina – Vieni fra queste braccia – Gianetto
- Brindisi – Tocchiamo, Beviamo – Pippo
- Duetto – Come frenare il pianto – Ninetta e Fernando
- Cavatina – Il mio piano è preparato – Podestà
- Terzetto – Oh Nume benefico

== Act Two ==
- Duetto – Forse un dì conoscerete – Ninetta e Giannetto
- Aria – Si per voi, pupille amate – Podestà
- Duetto – Ebben, per mia memoria – Ninetta e Pippo
- Aria – Accusato di furto – Fernando
- Aria – A questo seno – Lucia
- Preghiera – Deh tu reggi in tal momento – Ninetta

== Recordings ==
Year	Cast:	Conductor, Opera House and Orchestra	Label
1978	Rosetta Pizzo, Pietro Bottazza, Alberto Rinaldi, Angelo Romero, Helga Muller, Francesco Signor, Nuci Condo	Alberto Zedda, Royal Philharmonic Orchestra and Ambrosian Opera Chorus	Audio LP: Italia Fonit Cetra; Cat: ITL 70056
1987	Ileana Cotrubas, Carlos Feller, Nucci Condò, David Kuebler, Brent Ellis	Bruno Bartoletti, Gürzenich Orchester Köln and the Kölner Oper Chorus	DVD: ArtHaus Musik; Cat: 102 203
1989	Katia Ricciarelli, Roberto Coviello, Luciana D'Intino, William Matteuzzi, Ferruccio Furlanetto	Gianluigi Gelmetti, Orchestra Sinfonica di Torino della R.A.I., Coro Filarmonico di Praga; Live recording in the Teatro Rossini (Pesaro) during Rossini Opera Festival	CD: Sony; Cat: S3K 45 850
1998	Cinzia Forte, Franco Vassallo, Linda Tirendi, Simon Edwards, Natale de Carolis	Giancarlo Andretta, Teatro la Fenice di Venezia Orchestra and Chorus; Recording of a performance in Venice, 31 January)	Audio CD: Mondo Musica; Cat: MFOH 20111
2007	Mariola Cantarero, Paolo Bordogna, Kleopatra Papatheologou, Dmitry Korchak, Alex Esposito	Lü Jia, Orchestra Haydn di Bolzano e Trento (Video recording made at performances of the Rossini Opera Festival, Pesaro, August)	DVD: Dynamic, Cat: 33567
2009	Marie José Moreno, Giulio Mastrototaro, Luisa Islam Ali-Zade, Kenneth Tarver, Lorenzo Regazzo	Alberto Zedda, Virtuosi Brunensis (Live recording from the XXIst Rossini in Wildbad Belcanto Opera Festival)	Audio CD: Naxos Records; 8.660369-71

== Film ==
An animated short film called La gazza ladra was made in 1964 by Giulio Gianini and Emanuele Luzzati using the overture as the soundtrack, with motion synchronized to the music. It was constructed by moving cutouts from frame to frame to illustrate a story of a thieving magpie, centered on the magpie, unlike in the opera. In 1965 the film was nominated for an Academy Award and won the first Grand Prix of the Melbourne International Film Festival.

Stanley Kubrick used the overture for the early scenes of his movie A Clockwork Orange. The music gives the viewer a voyeuristic insight into the exhilaration that the sociopathic narrator Alex obtains from a typical night out with his friends performing acts of violence and mayhem while mindless of the horrific consequences for his victims.

The overture served as influence in John Williams' "Aunt Marge’s Waltz" from Harry Potter and the Prisoner of Azkaban.

The British Music Group Marillion used the overture to Rossini's opera La gazza ladra, before coming on stage during the Clutching at Straws tour 1987–1988, and released a live album named after the opera.

In his 1984 film Once Upon a Time in America, director Sergio Leone used the overture for the scene in which the gang switches the baby identification tags in the hospital maternity ward.
