= L'accademia di musica (Mayr) =

L'accademia di musica was a farsa for the Teatro di San Samuele in 1800 by German composer Johann Simon Mayr.

== Recording ==
- Johann Simon Mayr: l'Accademia Di Musica ('the Academy of Music') Passionart Orchestra, Andrés Jesús Gallucci, Filippo Morace, César Cortés, Eleonora Bellocci, Ricardo Seguel, Maria Del Mar Humanes, Filippo Pina Castiglioni, Nicola Pascoli 2022 Naxos Length: 75 minutes
