= Opéra de Rennes =

Opera house in Rennes, France

Coordinates: 48.1114°N 1.6786°W

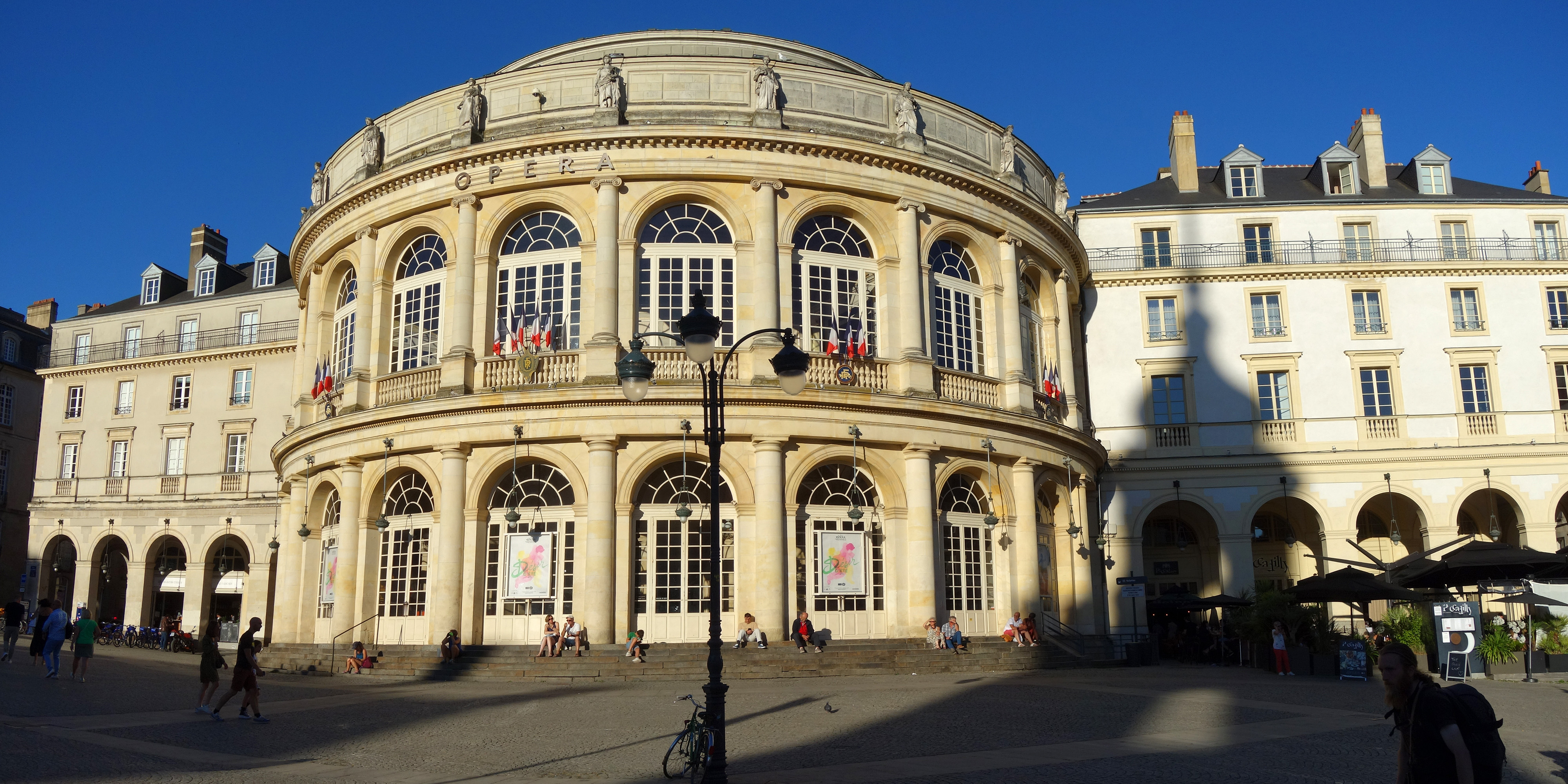
The Opéra de Rennes in July 2022

The Opéra de Rennes (Rennes Opera House) is an Italian-style opera house located in downtown Rennes, France. It was designed by Charles Millardet and built by Pierre Louise. It was inaugurated in 1836. It is located on Place de la Mairie, forming the main eastern side of the square opposite the town hall.

Today, the building mainly hosts opera performances and organizes a number of local events, such as the "Opéra en plein air". It has been listed as a historic monument since October 29, 1975.
