= Giovanni Tadolini =

Italian composer (1789–1872)

- Born: 18 October 1789; Bologna, Italy
- Died: 29 November 1872 (aged 83); Bologna, Italy
- Occupation: Composer

Giovanni Tadolini (18 October 1789 – 29 November 1872) was an Italian composer, conductor and singing instructor, who enjoyed a career that alternated between Bologna and Paris. Tadolini is probably best known for completing six sections of Rossini's 1833 version of the Stabat mater after the latter fell sick. However, he also composed eight operas as well as sinfonias, sonatas, chamber music, and numerous pieces of religious music and art songs.

== Biography ==
Born in Bologna, he studied privately with Matteo Rubini (singing) and Stanislao Mattei (composition) at the Liceo Musicale (now the Conservatorio Giovanni Battista Martini) of his native city, before going to work at the Théâtre-Italien in Paris as a répétiteur and chorus master from 1811 to 1814. Following the occupation of Paris by the Russian and Austrian armies in 1814, he returned to Italy where over the next 15 years he wrote a series of operas and served as a conductor and chorus master for the Teatro Comunale di Bologna. He also became a member of Bologna's Accademia Filarmonica and maestro di cappella of St. Peter's Cathedral in the city.

In 1827, he married the soprano Eugenia Tadolini (née Savorani) who had been his student in Bologna. Tadolini returned to the Théâtre-Italien in 1829 with his wife, he as the director, and she as a singer in the company. The marriage ended in divorce in 1834. Following the divorce, Tadolini remained in his post at the Théâtre-Italien until 1839 when he returned definitively to Bologna.

Later in his life, he ran a singing school in Bologna, where he died in 1872.

== Works ==
Operas

- Le bestie in uomini (Venice, Teatro San Moisè, 1815; libretto by Angelo Anelli)
- La fata Alcina (Venice, Teatro San Moisè, 1815)
- La principessa di Navarra, ossia Il Gianni di Parigi (Bologna, Teatro Contavalli, 1816)
- Il credulo deluso (Rome, Teatro Valle, 1817; libretto by Cesare Sterbini)
- Tamerlano (Bologna, 1818; libretto after Agostino Piovene)
- Moctar, gran visir di Adrianopoli (Bologna, Teatro Comunale, 1824; libretto by Luigi Romanelli)
- Mitridate (Venice, La Fenice 1827; libretto by Gaetano Rossi)
- Almanzor (Trieste, Teatro Grande, 1827; libretto by Felice Romani)

Art songs

- La farfalla – voice and piano, text by Carlo Pepoli, dedicated to Marie Lutyens
- La potenza d'amore – tenor voice, piano, and French horn, text by Carlo Pepoli
- La fuga di Bianca Capello – bass voice and piano, text by Carlo Pepoli
- Se la vita vuoi godere – tenor voice and piano

== Sources ==
- Ambìveri, Corrado, Operisti minori dell'800 italiano, Gremese Editore, 1998. ISBN 88-7742-263-7
- Ashbrook, William, Donizetti and His Operas, Cambridge University Press, 1983. ISBN 0-521-27663-2
- Biblioteca Nazionale Braidense, Taddolini, Giovanni, Catalogo nazionale dei manoscritti musicali redatti fino al 1900. Accessed 23 October 2009 (in Italian).
- Casaglia, Gherardo (2005). "Giovanni Tadolini". L'Almanacco di Gherardo Casaglia (in Italian).
- Fétis, François-Joseph, "Tadolini, Giovanni", Biographie universelle des musiciens et bibliographie génèrale de la musique, Volume 8, Firmin-Didot, 1865
- Forbes, Elizabeth (1992). "Tadolini, Giovanni". Grove Music Online (8th ed.). Oxford University Press. doi:10.1093/gmo/9781561592630.article.27358. ISBN 978-1-56159-263-0. (subscription, Wikilibrary access, or UK public library membership required)
- Hubbard, W. L., "Tadolini, Giuseppe", The American History And Encyclopedia of Music: Musical Biographies, Part II, originally published in 1910, published in facsimile by Kessinger Publishing, 2005. ISBN 1-4179-0713-4
- Osborne, Richard, Rossini: his life and works, Oxford University Press US, 2007. ISBN 0-19-518129-8
- Sanvitale, Francesco, La romanza italiana da salotto, EDT srl, 2002. ISBN 88-7063-615-1
