= Stabat Mater (Rossini) =

Composition by Gioachino Rossini

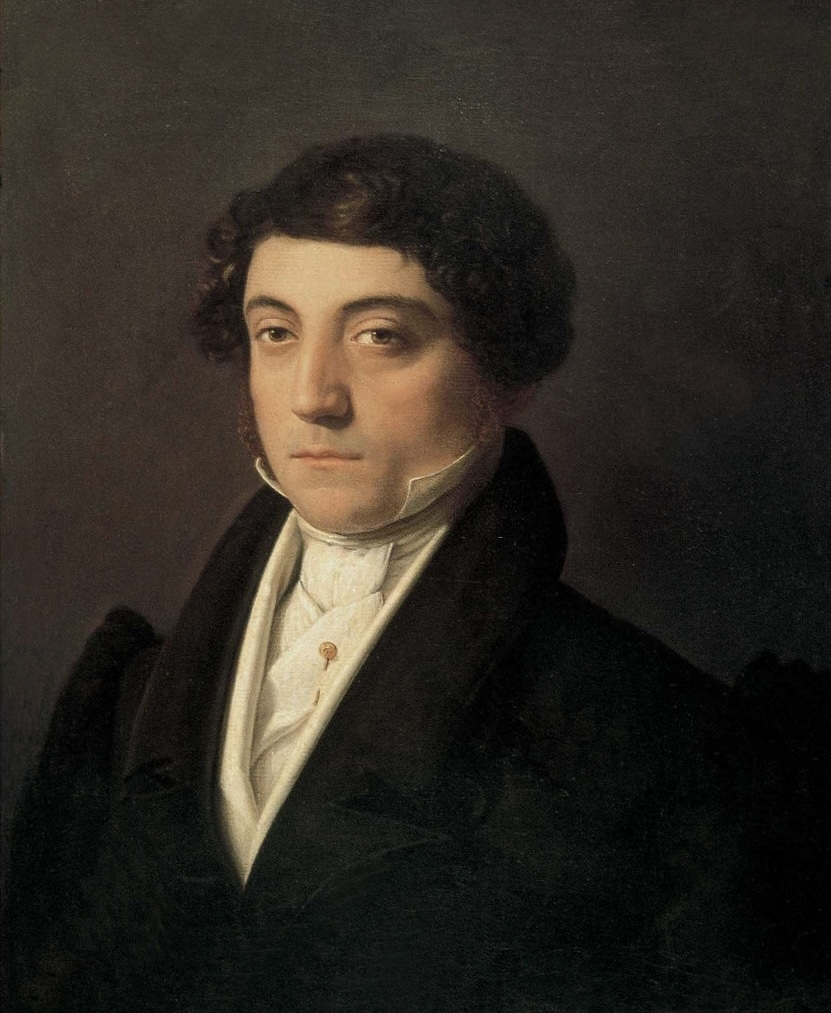
Portrait of Gioachino Rossini by Vincenzo Camuccini, Museo Teatrale alla Scala in Milan

Stabat Mater is a work by Gioachino Rossini based on the traditional structure of the Stabat Mater sequence for chorus and soloists. It was composed late in his career after retiring from the composition of opera. He began the work in 1831 but did not complete it until 1841.

== Composition ==
In 1831 Rossini was traveling in Spain in the company of his friend the Spanish banker Alexandre Aguado, owner of Château Margaux. In the course of the trip, Fernández Varela, a state councillor, commissioned a setting of the traditional liturgical text, the Stabat Mater. Rossini managed to complete part of the setting of the sequence in 1832, but ill health made it impossible for him to complete the commission. Having written only half the score (nos. 1 and 5–9), he asked his friend Giovanni Tadolini to compose six additional movements. Rossini presented the completed work to Varela as his own. It was premiered on Holy Saturday of 1833 in the Chapel of San Felipe el Real in Madrid, but this version was never again performed.

When Varela died, his heirs sold the work for 2,000 francs to a Parisian music publisher, Antoine Aulagnier, who printed it. Rossini protested, claiming that he had reserved publication rights for himself, and disowned Aulagnier's version, since it included the music by Tadolini. Although surprised by this, Aulangier went ahead and arranged for a public performance at the Salle Herz on 31 October 1841, at which only the six pieces by Rossini were performed. In fact, Rossini had already sold the publication rights for 6,000 francs to another Paris publisher, Eugène Troupenas. Lawsuits ensued, and Troupenas emerged the victor. Rossini finished the work, replacing the music by Tadolini, before the end of 1841. The brothers Léon and Marie Escudier, who had purchased the performing rights of Rossini's final version of the score from Troupenas for 8,000 francs, sold them to the director of the Théâtre-Italien for 20,000 francs, who began making preparations for its first performance.

Rossini's extensive operatic career had divided the public into admirers and critics. The announcement of the premiere of Rossini's Stabat Mater provided an occasion for a wide-ranging attack by Richard Wagner, who was in Paris at the time, not only on Rossini but more generally on the current European fashion for religious music and the money to be made from it. A week before the scheduled concert Robert Schumann's Neue Zeitschrift für Musik carried the pseudonymous essay, penned by Wagner under the name of "H. Valentino", in which he claimed to find Rossini's popularity incomprehensible: "It is extraordinary! So long as this man lives, he'll always be the mode." Wagner concluded his polemic with the following observation: "That dreadful word: Copyright—growls through the scarce laid breezes. Action! Action! Once more, Action! And money is fetched out, to pay the best of lawyers, to get documents produced, to enter caveats.—O ye foolish people, have ye lost your hiking for your gold? I know somebody who for five francs will make you five waltzes, each of them better than that misery of the wealthy master's!" At the time when Wagner wrote this, he was still in his late twenties and he had not yet had much success with the acceptance of his own music in the French capital.

== Performance history ==
The Stabat Mater was performed complete for the first time in Paris at the Théâtre-Italien's Salle Ventadour on 7 January 1842, with Giulia Grisi (soprano), Emma Albertazzi (mezzo-soprano), Mario (tenor), and Antonio Tamburini (baritone) as the soloists. The Escudiers reported that:

Rossini's name was shouted out amid the applause. The entire work transported the audience; the triumph was complete. Three numbers had to be repeated...and the audience left the theater moved and seized by an admiration that quickly won all Paris.

In March Gaetano Donizetti led the Italian premiere in Bologna with great success. The soloists included Clara Novello (soprano) and Nicola Ivanoff (tenor). Donizetti reported the public's reaction:

The enthusiasm is impossible to describe. Even at the final rehearsal, which Rossini attended, in the middle of the day, he was accompanied to his home to the shouting of more than 500 persons. The same thing the first night, under his window, since he did not appear in the hall.

Despite the fact that the work is markedly different from his secular compositions, Northern German critics, as reported by Heinrich Heine in an essay on Rossini, criticised the work as "too worldly, sensuous, too playful for the religious subject." In response the French music historian Gustave Chouquet has remarked that "it must not be forgotten that religion in the South is a very different thing from what it is in the North."

== Music ==
The Stabat Mater is scored for four vocal soloists (soprano, mezzo-soprano, tenor, and bass), mixed chorus, and an orchestra of 2 flutes, 2 oboes, 2 clarinets, 2 bassoons, 4 horns, 2 trumpets, 3 trombones, timpani, and strings.

Rossini divided the poem's twenty 3-line verses into ten movements and used various combinations of forces for each movement:

1. Stabat Mater dolorosa (verse 1) – Chorus and all four soloists
2. Cujus animam (verses 2–4) – Tenor
3. Quis est homo (verses 5–6) – Soprano and mezzo-soprano
4. Pro peccatis (verses 7–8) – Bass
5. Eja, Mater (verses 9–10) – Bass recitative and chorus
6. Sancta Mater (verses 11–15) – All four soloists
7. Fac ut portem (verses 16–17) – Mezzo-soprano
8. Inflammatus (verses 18–19) – Soprano and chorus
9. Quando corpus morietur (verse 20) – Chorus and all four soloists
10. In sempiterna saecula. Amen (not part of the standard text) – Chorus

Written in 1841 for tenor solo, the andantino maestoso section "Cuius animam", with its rollicking and memorable tune, is often performed apart from the work's other movements as a demonstration of the singer's bravura technique. The first theme in "Cujus animam" was also quoted note-for-note in the 1941 Woody Herman jazz number, "Blues on Parade".

== Recordings ==
- 1952
  - Arturo Toscanini, conductor
  - NBC Symphony Orchestra, Westminster Choir (chorus master: John Finley Williamson)
  - Soloists: Lucine Amara, Risë Stevens, Nicolai Gedda, Nicola Rossi-Lemeni
  - RCA Victor 8295 667898-2 (live recording at Carnegie Hall, New York, 13 November 1952)
- 1954
  - Ferenc Fricsay, conductor
  - RIAS Symphony Orchestra, RIAS Chamber Choir, Chorus of St. Hedwig's Cathedral
  - Soloists: Maria Stader, Marianna Radev, Ernst Haefliger, Kim Borg
  - Audite 95587 (mono, live recording from Berlin Konzertsaal der Hochschule, 22 September 1954)
- 1961
  - Karl Forster, conductor
  - Berliner Symphoniker, Chor der St. Hedwigs-Kathedrale Berlin
  - Soloists: Pilar Lorengar, Betty Allen, Josef Traxel, Josef Greindl
  - EMI
- 1971
  - István Kertész, conductor
  - London Symphony Orchestra and Chorus
  - Soloists: Pilar Lorengar, Yvonne Minton, Luciano Pavarotti, Hans Sotin
  - Decca Ovation 417 766-2 (reissued from 1971)
- 1982
  - Carlo Maria Giulini, conductor
  - Philharmonia Orchestra and Chorus
  - Soloists: Katia Ricciarelli, Lucia Valentini Terrani, Dalmacio Gonzalez, Ruggero Raimondi
  - DG 477 6333
- 1982
  - Riccardo Muti, conductor
  - Maggio Musicale Fiorentino Orchestra
  - Soloists: Catherine Malfitano, Agnes Baltsa, Robert Gambill, Gwynne Howell
  - EMI Classics CDC7 47402–2
- 1988
  - Claudio Scimone, conductor
  - I Solisti Veneti, Ambrosian Singers
  - Soloists: Cecilia Gasdia, Margarita Zimmermann, Chris Merritt, José Garcia
  - Erato/RCA MCE75493
- 1990
  - Richard Hickox, conductor
  - City of London Sinfonia, London Symphony Chorus
  - Soloists: Helen Field, Della Jones, Arthur Davies, Roderick Earle
  - Chandos 8780
- 1990
  - Semyon Bychkov, conductor
  - Bavarian Radio Symphony Orchestra, Bavarian Radio Chorus
  - Soloists: Carol Vaness, Cecilia Bartoli, Francisco Araiza, Ferruccio Furlanetto
  - Phillips Digital Classics 426 312-2
- 1995
  - Myung-Whun Chung, conductor
  - Vienna Philharmonic, Vienna State Opera Concert Choir
  - Soloists: Ľuba Orgonášová, Cecilia Bartoli, Raúl Giménez, Roberto Scandiuzzi
  - DG 449 178-2GH
- 1999
  - Pier Giorgio Morandi, conductor
  - Hungarian State Opera Orchestra and Chorus
  - Soloists: Patrizia Pace, Gloria Scalchi, Antonio Siragusa, Carlo Colombara
- 1999
  - Marcus Creed, conductor
  - Academy for Ancient Music Berlin, RIAS Chamber Choir
  - Soloists: Krassimira Stoyanova, Petra Lang, Bruce Fowler, Daniel Borowski
  - Harmonia Mundi HMC90 1693.Period instrument recording.
- 2001
  - Christoph Spering, conductor
  - Das neue Orchester, Chorus Musicus
  - Soloists: Iride Martinez, Sara Mingardo, Charles Castronovo, John Relyea
  - OPUS 111 OP 30247
- 2003
  - Riccardo Chailly, conductor
  - Royal Concertgebouw Orchestra; Netherlands Radio Chorus
  - Soloists: Barbara Frittoli, Sonia Ganassi, Giuseppe Sabbatini, Michele Pertusi
  - Decca 460781-2
- 2010
  - Antonio Pappano, conductor
  - Orchestra dell'Accademia Santa Cecilia, orchestra and chorus
  - Soloists: Anna Netrebko, Joyce DiDonato, Lawrence Brownlee, Ildebrando D'Arcangelo
  - EMI Classics
