= Raúl Giménez =

Argentine opera singer (born 1950)

- Born: September 14, 1950 (age 75); Carlos Pellegrini, Province of Santa Fe, Argentina
- Occupation: Operatic tenor
- Known for: Italian bel canto opera
- Notable work: Don Pasquale, Il barbiere di Siviglia

Raúl Giménez (born on September 14, 1950) is an Argentine operatic tenor, associated with the Italian bel canto vocal style.

Giménez was born in Carllos, Perigrinni, Province of Santa Fe, Argentina. He studied at the Music Conservatory of Buenos Aires and made his operatic debut at the Teatro Colón as Ernesto in Don Pasquale in 1980. After appearing in concert and opera throughout South America, he came to Europe in 1984, where he debuted at the Wexford Festival in Ireland in Cimarosa's Le astuzie femminili.

Giménez made his American debut in Dallas in 1989, as Ernesto in Don Pasquale. In 1996 he debuted at the Metropolitan Opera New York, as Count Almaviva in Il barbiere di Siviglia. He also appeared frequently in works by Donizetti and Bellini, as well as composers such as Salieri and Pacini.

Giménez has maintained a parallel career in the concert hall. His 1987 Nimbus release, Argentinian Songs with pianist Nina Walker, included works by Ginastera, Guastavino, Carlos Buchardo, and composer Abraham Jurafsky, intended for a global audience.

== Selected recordings ==
- Rossini – L'italiana in Algeri, Teldec
- Rossini – Il barbiere di Siviglia, Teldec
- Rossini – La cenerentola, Teldec
- Rossini – L'inganno felice, Erato
- Rossini – La Pietra del Paragone ROF
- Rossini – Il Turco in Italia, Philips
- Rossini – Il Viaggio a Reims, Sony
- Mayr – Medea in Corinto, Opera Rara
- Bellini – La sonnambula, Naxos
- Salieri – Les Danaïdes, EMI
- Rossini – Stabat Mater, DG
- Rossini – Messa di Gloria, Philips
- Rossini – La petite messe solennelle, Philips
- Pacini – L'ultimo giorno di Pompei, Dynamic
