= Rossini Opera Festival =

Music festival held in Pesaro, Italy

The Rossini Opera Festival (ROF) is an international music festival held in August of each year in Pesaro, Italy, the birthplace of the opera composer Gioachino Rossini. Its aim, in addition to studying the musical heritage of the composer, is to revive and perform his works in a unique setting that allows collaboration of scholars, artists, and audience. It is often simply referred to as the Pesaro Festival.

Performances are given in the 850-seat theatre built in 1818, the Teatro Rossini and, since 1988, the modified sports arena (Palasport) which holds 1,500, as well as, since 2006, Vitrifrigo Arena, with over 10,000. Since 2000 another venue, the Teatro Sperimentale (Experimental Theatre), has offered the opportunity to present smaller-scale or minor works by contemporaries of Rossini such as Mosca, Generali, and Coccia. The main square of Pesaro, the Piazza del Popolo, also hosts outdoor performances. It will be extensively used during the Festival's 2020 season, which was modified due to the COVID-19 pandemic.

== Rossini's music in Pesaro ==
Prior to the establishment of the Festival, it was not uncommon to see productions of Rossini's music taking place to mark occasions in his life and death. Thus, in 1868 when the composer died in Paris, his Stabat Mater was performed along with Semiramide and Otello. The first centennial of Rossini's birth in 1892 saw L'occasione fa il ladro and the twentieth-century seasons saw many Rossini operas including many quite obscure ones.

== The Festival established in 1980 ==
The Festival was established in 1980 with the aim of making the world more aware of Rossini's neglected operas and presenting all of them in collaboration with the Casa Ricordi music publishing house, which published their critical editions. Of the approximately three dozen operas written, only a handful are regularly presented.

On 13 August 1993, the Italian parliament unanimously approved the Special Law N. 319 "Regulations in support of the Rossini Opera Festival", which recognizes the Pesaro Festival's achievements in the reviving of Rossini's operas as entitled to be included among the state-supervised works of restoration of the national artistic heritage. The ensuing grant (of which parliament has recently approved the continuation) is financed from the funds of the Beni Culturali.

The Rossini Festival has seen many of Rossini's lesser-known works revived, some of which have since entered the standard operatic repertoire.

From the beginning, the Festival attracted some major singers including Marilyn Horne, Montserrat Caballé, Ruggero Raimondi, Samuel Ramey and Juan Diego Flórez. Based on press reports, some productions have been extremely controversial.

== See also ==
- List of opera festivals
