= Darina Takova =

Bulgarian soprano and teacher (born 1963)

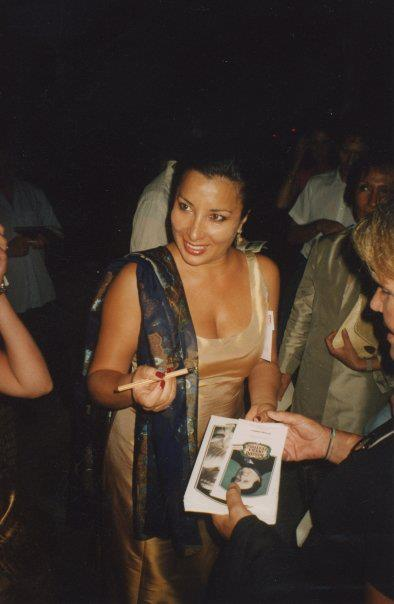
- Born: 27 December 1963 (age 62); Sofia, Bulgaria
- Occupations: Soprano, Teacher

Darina Takova (Bulgarian: Дарина Такова; Sofia, 27 December 1963) is a Bulgarian soprano and teacher.

== Education and first steps ==
Darina Takova was born in Sofia, where she finished her studies at National Academy Pancho Vladigerov in the class of Prof. Mati Pinkas and Prof. Mila Dyulgerova. Takova has been a member of the National Opera for six seasons since 1989. During this period, she also performed at all national opera houses and concert halls in Bulgaria. She has won awards from Luisa Todi in Lisbon, Young Opera Singers in Sofia, Francesc Viñas Barcelona, Totti Del Monte in Treviso.

== Career ==
In 1992 she began an international active career on the world's largest opera stages, in Milan (La Scala), Roma, Florence, Bologna, Turin, Verona, Palermo, Trieste, Naples, Venice, Parma, Festival Rossini di Pesaro, Bergamo, Arena di Verona, Concertgebouw Amsterdam, Carnegie Hall in New York, Festival Barrock Innsbruck, Bayerische Staatsoper Munich, Deutsche Oper Berlin, Hamburgische Staatsoper, Oper Frankfurt, Opera of Geneva and Lausanne, Teatro Real de Madrid, Gran Teatre del LiceuBarcelona, Royal Opera House Covent Garden London, Opéra National de Paris, Opéra de Monte-Carlo, National Theater Tokyo, Korea National Opera, Opera Canada, Los Angeles Opera House, Metropolitan Opera House New York, among others.

In 1995 she sang the title role in Verdi's Luisa Miller in Germany and Switzerland. After singing in a production of The Golden Cockerel in Rome she took part in the Rome Summer Festival as Gilda. At the Geneva Opera Theater she sang in Arabella and Rigoletto. In 1998 Takova made her debut at Teatro alla Scala as the Queen of the Night with Riccardo Muti conducting. This was followed by performances at La Scala in Donizetti's Lucrezia Borgia. Additional appearances in Italy in 1998 included Lucia di Lammermoor in Florence and Violetta in Rome. In Lausanne she appeared in Ariadne auf Naxos and in Covent Garden in The Golden Cockerel. In the Covent Garden she also sang Violetta from La Traviata.

Her debut in the United States was in 1997 where she sang in California and Detroit. After that become her debut at Metropolitan Opera House in New York as Marguerite in Faust.

Her noted roles have included Violetta in La traviata, title roles in Semiramide, Lucia di Lammermoor, Lucrezia Borgia, Anna Bolena, Maria Stuarda, the Queen of the Night in The Magic Flute, Amina in La sonnambula, Marguerite in Faust, and Elvira in I Puritani, among others.

She has worked with conductors including Riccardo Muti, Claudio Abbado, Zubin Mehta, Alberto Zedda, Carlo Rizzi, Victor Pablo Pérez, Riccardo Frizza, Maurizio Benini, Vladimir Jurowski and Nayden Todorov among others.

Takova has sung with such international opera singers as Renato Bruson, Mariella Devia, Juan Diego Flórez, Ildebrando D'Arcangelo, Marco Berti, Daniella Barcellona, Michele Pertusi, Marcello Álvarez, Ruggiero Raimondi, Giuseppe Sabbatini, Nicola Marchesini, Boyko Tzvetanov and Laura Polverelli.

In 2007, Darina Takova retired from the international scene following complications from the flu and Hepatitis A, as well as a subsequent medical intervention.

== Teacher and mentor ==
Since 2007 Takova started actively teaching by offering master classes and counseling to young opera singers from Bulgaria and abroad. Since 2013 Takova has been a mentor of Operosa.

In 2007 created the Darina Takova Foundation located in Sofia, to promote young opera talents.

== Discography ==
Opera	Role	Director	Cast	Year	Type	Label
Opera Recital	Soprano	Metodi Matakiev	Darina Takova	2000	CD	Gega
La Traviata	Violetta	Carlo Rizzi	Darina Takova, Maya Dashuk, Giuseppe Sabbatini, Vittorio Vitelli	2001	CD/DVD	
Tancredi	Amenaide	Riccardo Frizza	Darina Takova, Daniela Barcellona, Marco Spotti, Giuseppe Filianoti, Nicola Marchesini, Laura Polverelli, Raúl Giménez, Simoni Alberghini	2005	CD/DVD	Arthaus Musik
Luisa Miller	Luisa	Maurizio Benini	Darina Takova, Giuseppe Sabbatini, Arutjun Kotchinian, Ursula Ferri	2006	CD/DVD	Naxos
Torvaldo e Dorliska	Dorliska	Victor Pablo Pérez	Darina Takova, Michele Pertusi, Francesco Meli, Jeannette Fischer	2006	CD/DVD	NTSC
