= Julian Konstantinov =

Bulgarian operatic bass

Julian Konstantinov (Bulgarian: Юлиян Константинов) (also Yuliyan Konstantinov) (born 1966) is a Bulgarian operatic bass particularly known for his interpretations of the works of Wolfgang Amadeus Mozart, Giuseppe Verdi, and the bel canto roles of Rossini and Donizetti. More recently he has become associated with the title role in Modest Mussorgsky's Boris Godunov, a role he has sung in numerous opera houses.

== Career ==
Konstantinov studied opera under Assen Selimski at the Bulgarian Music Academy in Sofia from 1987 to 1993. He made his professional opera debut while still a student at the Sofia National Opera in a minor role in Rossini's The Barber of Seville. He also appeared in a production of Stravinsky's The Rake's Progress while still a student. In 1993 he garnered wide attention when he won the BBC Cardiff Singer of the World competition and he was soon cast in several major roles in opera houses throughout Europe. In 1995 he made his debuts with Wexford Festival Opera and the Teatro Colón in Buenos Aires. This was soon followed by his debut at La Scala, making him the youngest bass ever to sing at the prestigious opera house. His other international appearances have taken him to Germany, France, Spain, Holland, Brazil, Great Britain and the United States. In 1998 he recorded the role of Oroe in Rossini's Semiramide with Edita Gruberova in the title role. In 1999 he sang the role of Moser in Verdi's I masnadieri with the Opera Orchestra of New York. In 2001, he joined Angela Gheorghiu, Daniela Barcellona, Roberto Alagna, and the Berlin Philharmonic in a production of Verdi's Requiem under the baton of Claudio Abbado. In 2002, he sang the title role in Boris Godunov with Opéra Bastille and the role of Fiesco in Simon Boccanegra with the Maggio Musicale Fiorentino. In 2003 he sang the role of Boris again at the Grand Théâtre de Genève and the role of Padre Guardiano in Verdi's La forza del destino at Carnegie Hall in New York City. That same year his recording of Ralph Vaughan Williams's Sea Symphony with Robert Spano, Christine Goerke, and the Atlanta Symphony Orchestra won a Grammy Award. In 2004 he made his Metropolitan Opera debut as Sparafucile in Verdi's Rigoletto, a role he later recorded that year at the Liceu. In 2005 he performed the role of Roger in Verdi's Jérusalem with conductor Paolo Olmi conducts the Netherlands Radio Symphony Orchestra and Choir.

Konstantinov has spent much of his career singing roles with the Sofia National Opera where he has appeared as Mephistopheles in Gounod's Faust, Raimondo in Donizetti's Lucia di Lammermoor, Count Walter in Verdi's Luisa Miller, Sparafucile in Verdi's Rigoletto, Fiesco in Verdi's Simon Boccanegra, Sarastro in Mozart's Die Zauberflöte, both Don Pedro and the title role in Mozart's Don Giovanni, and as Timur in Puccini's Turandot among other roles. His Sofia Opera appearances and later Bulgarian opera engagements have included productions conducted by Nayden Todorov, Metodi Matakiev, Grigor Palikarov and Oliver von Dohnányi.

== Family ==
Konstantinov's younger brother, Plamen Konstantinov, is a former volleyball player and captain of the Bulgaria men's national volleyball team and last played for Iraklis VC in the Greek A1 Volleyball League.

== Controversy ==
On 20 May 2012, Konstantinov allegedly has assaulted a Bulgarian journalist, Kiril Hristov, after seeing the latter turning up his SUV's wipers. Mr. Hristov apparently did this as a protest for having Konstantinov's car improperly parked. The incident gained fast publicity among the Bulgarian online community. Both Mr. Hristov and Mr. Konstantinov wrote their versions of what happened.

== Discography ==
=== Choral and symphonic ===
Year	Title	Genre	Collaborators	Label
2002	Verdi: Requiem	classical	Claudio Abbado; Berlin Philharmonic; Angela Gheorghiu (soprano); Roberto Alagna (tenor); Daniela Barcellona (mezzo-soprano)	EMI Classics
2003	Vaughan Williams: A Sea Symphony (Grammy Award winner)	classical	Robert Spano (Conductor); Atlanta Symphony Orchestra and Chorus; Christine Goerke (soprano); Brett Polegato (tenor)	Telarc

=== Opera recordings ===
Year	Title	Role	Cast	Label
1998	Rossini: Semiramide	Oroe	Marcello Panni (conductor); Vienna Radio Symphony Orchestra; Edita Gruberova (Semiramide), Bernadette Manca di Nissa (Arsace), Hélène Le Corre (Azema), Ildebrando D'Arcangelo (Assur), Juan Diego Flórez (Idreno), José Guadalupe Reyes (Mitrane), Andreas Jankowitsch (Nino's ghost)	Nightingale Records
2002	Verdi: Simon Boccanegra	Jacopo Fiesco	Claudio Abbado (conductor); Maggio Musicale Fiorentino orchestra and chorus Carlo Guelfi (Simon Boccanegra), Karita Mattila (Maria Boccanegra), Vincenzo La Scola (Gabriele Adorno), Lucio Gallo (Paolo Albiani), Andrea Concetti (Pietro)	Universal Music Group; Also available on TDK DVD Video
2004	Verdi: Rigoletto	Sparafucile	Jesús López-Cobos (conductor); Liceu orchestra and chorus Inva Mula (Violetta), Marcelo Álvarez (Alfredo), Carlos Álvarez (Giorgio)	TDK DVD Video
