= Bernadette Manca di Nissa =

Italian opera singer

- Born: November 27, 1954 (age 71); Cagliari, Sardinia, Italy
- Occupation: Opera singer

Bernadette Manca di Nissa (born 27 September 1954) is an Italian operatic contralto who has sung leading roles in the principal opera houses of Italy as well as internationally. She has appeared at La Scala in Milan, La Fenice in Venice, Teatro San Carlo in Naples, and the Maggio Musicale Fiorentino in Florence as well as at the Royal Opera House, Covent Garden, Gran Teatre del Liceu in Barcelona, Lyric Opera of Chicago, Salzburg Festival, Matsumoto Festival in Nagano, NHK in Tokyo, São Carlos Theater in Lisbon and others.

Born in Cagliari and a descendant of a noble family, she studied singing privately and later at the Mozarteum University of Salzburg. Initially specializing in Baroque music and Rossini's works (Tancredi, Semiramide, L'Italiana in Algeri, La gazza ladra), she developed a wide-ranging repertoire that includes works by Monteverdi, Handel, Jommelli, Mozart, Gluck (Orfeo ed Euridice), Salieri, Donizetti, Verdi (Falstaff), Puccini, Stravinsky and the 20th-century composer Luigi Nono. She has appeared in the world premières of several of Nono's works, including Quando stanno morendo (1982), Guai ai gelidi mostri (1983), and Prometeo, Tragedia dell'ascolto (1984).

During the later years of her stage career, she also taught singing in master classes and courses at the Maggio Musicale Fiorentino, Lyric Opera of Chicago, Associazione Musicale Scaligera and the Accademia Musicale Chigiana, amongst others. She retired from the stage in 2007, after which she has devoted herself to her teaching career. Nowadays, she is professor of Singing at Conservatorio di Cagliari.

== Repertory ==
- Gaetano Donizetti
  - Anna Bolena (Smeton)
- Georg Friedrich Händel
  - Agrippina (Ottone)
  - Alcina (Bradamante)
  - Rinaldo
  - Semele (Ino, Juno)
- Christoph Willibald Gluck
  - Orfeo ed Euridice (Orfeo)
- Wolfgang Amadeus Mozart
  - Mitridate, re di Ponto (Farnace)
- Giovanni Battista Pergolesi
  - Lo frate 'nnamorato (Nina)
  - La morte di San Giuseppe (Maria Santissima)
- Giacomo Puccini
  - Suor Angelica (Zia Principessa)
- Gioachino Rossini
  - Semiramide (Arsace)
  - Tancredi (Tancredi, Isaura)
  - L'italiana in Algeri (Isabella)
  - La gazza ladra (Pippo)
  - Il viaggio a Reims (Modestina)
- Igor Stravinsky
  - Pulcinella (mezzo-soprano)
- Giuseppe Verdi
  - Falstaff (Mrs. Quickly)

== Recordings ==
Studio recordings include:

Year	Composer	Title	Role	Cast	Orchestra and choir	Conductor	Label
1989	Gaetano Donizetti	Anna Bolena	Smeton	Joan Sutherland, Samuel Ramey, Giorgio Surian	Welsh Opera Orchestra and Chorus	Richard Bonynge	Decca
1990	Igor Stravinsky	Pulcinella	contralto	David Gordon, John Ostendorf	The Saint Paul Chamber Orchestra	Christopher Hogwood	Decca
1991	Wolfgang Amadeus Mozart	Weisenhaus-Messe K. 139 and Credo-Messe K. 257	contralto		King's College Choir and English Chamber Orchestra	Stephen Cleobury	Decca
1999	Giacomo Puccini	Suor Angelica	La zia Principessa	Angela Gheorghiu, Maria Guleghina, Roberto Alagna, Neil Shicoff	London Symphony Orchestra	Antonio Pappano	EMI
2004	Giovanni Battista Pergolesi	Lo frate 'nnamorato	Nina	Alessandro Corbelli, Nuccia Focile, Amelia Felle, Luciana d'Intino	Teatro alla Scala	Riccardo Muti	Opus Arte

Live recordings include:

- Quando stanno morendo. Diario Polacco n.2, dir. Luigi Nono, Experimental Studio 1982 (world premiere)
- Agrippina, role Ottone, Orchestra Pedrollo di Vicenza, dir. Christopher Hogwood, Mondo Musica, Venice 1983
- Tancredi, role Isaura, with Lella Cuberli, Marilyn Horne, Nicola Zaccaria, Orchestra e Coro del Teatro La Fenice, dir. Ralf Weikert, Cetra, Venice 1983
- Mitridate re di Ponto, role Farnace, Orchestra e Coro del Teatro La Fenice, dir. Roderyck Brydon, Venice 1984
- Il viaggio a Reims, role Modestina, with Lucia Valentini Terrani, Lella Cuberli, Katia Ricciarelli, Francisco Araiza, Samuel Ramey, Ruggero Raimondi, Leo Nucci, Enzo Dara, Giorgio Surjan, William Matteuzzi, EYCO Orchestra, dir. Claudio Abbado, DGG, Pesaro 1984
- Lo frate 'nnamorato, role Nina, with Elisabeth Norberg-Schulz, Ezio di Cesare, Luciana D’Intino, Nuccia Focile, Alessandro Corbelli, Orchestra e Coro del Teatro alla Scala, dir. Riccardo Muti, Ricordi-EMI, Milan 1989
- Lo frate 'nnamorato (DVD), role Nina, with Elisabeth Norberg-Schulz, Ezio di Cesare, Luciana D’Intino, Nuccia Focile, Alessandro Corbelli, Orchestra del Teatro alla Scala, dir. Riccardo Muti, stage director Roberto De Simone, scenes Mauro Carosi, costumes Odette Nicoletti, elleu multimedia, Milan 1998
- La gazza ladra, role Pippo, with Katia Ricciarelli, William Matteuzzi, Samuel Ramey, Luciana D’Intino, Orchestra del Teatro Comunale di Bologna, dir. Gianluigi Gelmetti, Sony, Pesaro 1989
- La morte di San Giuseppe, role Maria Santissima, with Michele Ferruggia, Maria Angeles Peters, Patrizia Pace, Orchestra Scarlatti della RAI di Napoli, dir. Marcello Panni, EMI, 1990
- Messa di Gloria, role contralto, with Pietro Spagnoli, Robert Gambill, Francisco Araiza, Anna Caterina Antonacci, Orchestra e Coro dell'Accademia Nazionale di Santa Cecilia, dir. Salvatore Accardo, Ricordi-EMI, Rome 1992
- Tancredi (DVD), role Tancredi, with Raul Gimenez, Ildebrando D'Arcangelo, María Bayo, Radio Sinfonieorchester e Coro SDR, dir. Gianluigi Gelmetti, scenes and costumes Pier Luigi Pizzi, Arthaus, Schwtzingen 1992
- Falstaff, role Mrs. Quickly, with Daniela Dessì, Juan Pons, Roberto Frontali, Ramón Vargas, Orchestra e Coro del Teatro alla Scala, dir. Riccardo Muti, Sony, Milan 1993
- Gioachino Rossini Di tanti palpiti. Arie e canzoni inedite, aggiunte, alternative", Radio Sinfonieorchester Orchester Stuttgart, dir. Maurizio Benini, Ricordi-EMI, Pesaro 1993
- Semiramide, role Arsace, with Edita Gruberova, Juan Diego Florez, Ildebrando D'Arcangelo, Radio Symphonieorchester Wien e Wiener Konzertchor, dir. Marcello Panni, Nightingale Classics, Wien 1998
- Orfeo ed Euridice (DVD), role Orfeo, Orchestra e Coro del Teatro San Carlo di Napoli, dir. Gustav Kuhn, regia Alberto Fassini, scenes and costumes Pasquale Grossi, Brilliant Classics, Naples 1998
- Falstaff (DVD), role Mrs. Quickly, with Desiré Rancatore, Barbara Frittoli, Peter Hoare, Gwynne Howel, Robin Leggate, Roberto Frontali, Tarver Kenneth, Bryn Terfel, R.O.H. Covent Garden Orchestra and Choir, dir. Bernard Haitink, regia Graham Vick, BBC Opus Arte London 2000
- Falstaff (DVD), role Mrs. Quickly, with Inva Mula, Barbara Frittoli, Luigi Roni, Paolo Barbacini, Ernesto Gavazzi, Juan Diego Florez, Roberto Frontali, Anna Caterina Antonacci, Orchestra e Coro del Teatro alla Scala, dir. Riccardo Muti, regia Ruggero Cappuccio, EuroArts, Busseto 2001
