= Tomasz Konina =

Polish director and stage designer (1972–2017)

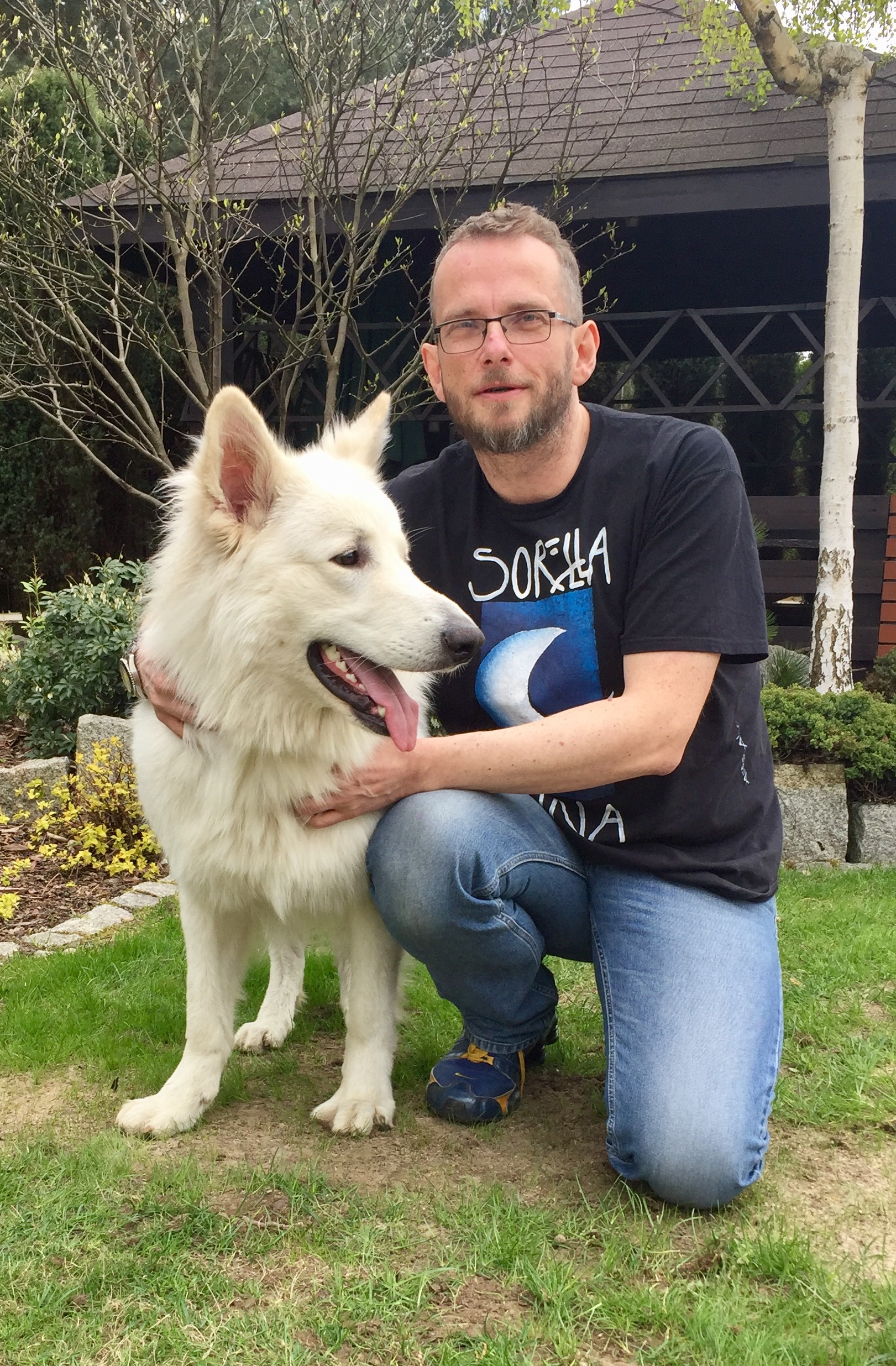
- Konina in 2017
- Born: 23 June 1972
- Died: 26 August 2017 (aged 45)
- Occupation(s): Director (theatre and opera), stage designer
- Website: tomaszkonina.com

Tomasz Konina (23 June 1972 – 26 August 2017) was a Polish theatre and opera director and stage designer.

== Biography ==
Born in Warsaw, on 23 June 1972, Konina graduated from the National Academy of Dramatic Art in Warsaw in 1996.

He made both his theatre and opera debut in 1998: Chekhov's Uncle Vanya at the Teatr Ateneum in Warsaw and Mozart's Marriage of Figaro at the Wrocław Opera.

In 2002, he was granted the scholarship of Vilar Young Artists Programme (presently: Jette Parker Young Artists Programme) at the Royal Opera House Covent Garden in London.

Graduate of the University of Economics in Wrocław (Managerial Postgraduate Studies on Business Management, Institute of Contemporary Management, at the Faculty of Management, 2013).

From 2007 to 2015, he was the artistic and executive director of the Jan Kochanowski Dramatic Theater in Opole.

== Opera, operetta and music productions ==
- 2000 – Rossini's Tancredi, Polish National Opera in Warsaw (with Ewa Podleś in title role, under music direction of Alberto Zedda)
- 2001 – Boito's Mefistofele, Opera Nova in Bydgoszcz
- 2002 – Beethoven's Fidelio, Grand Theatre, Poznań
- 2004 – Cilea's Adriana Lecouvreur, Grand Theatre, Łódź
- 2005 – Verdi's Macbeth, Grand Theatre, Łódź
- 2005 – Lehar's The Merry Widow, Music Theatre in Łódź
- 2006 – Verdi's La traviata, Wrocław Opera
- 2007 – Be like Callas (based on own scenario), Music Theatre in Łódź
- 2013 – Verdi's Falstaff, Grand Theatre, Poznań
- 2014 – Boito's Mefistofele, Cracow Opera
- 2015 – Strauss's The Gypsy Baron, Grand Theatre, Łódź
- 2015 – Boito's Mefistofele z Trondheim Symphony Orchestra
- 2017 – Verdi's La forza del destino, Silesian Opera, Bytom

Konina directed many works which had never been staged in Poland before:

- 2002 – Debussy's Pelléas and Mélisande, Polish National Opera, Warsaw
- 2003 – Rossini's Il viaggio a Reims, Polish National Opera, Warsaw (with Ewa Podleś as Marchesa Melibea, under music direction of Alberto Zedda)
- 2005 – Ullmann's The Emperor of Atlantis, Warsaw Chamber Opera
- 2005 – Bernstein's Candide, Grand Theatre, Łódź
- 2010 – Ptaszynska's The Lovers From the Valldemosa Monastery, Grand Theatre, Łódź

== Theatre productions ==
- 2001 – Suassuna's A Dog's Will, Cyprian Kamil Norwid Theatre in Jelenia Góra
- 2008 – Schimmelphennig's For a Better World, Jan Kochanowski Dramatic Theater in Opole
- 2008 – Chekhov's The Cherry Orchard, Jan Kochanowski Dramatic Theater in Opole
- 2009 – Dumas's The Lady of the Camellias, Jan Kochanowski Dramatic Theater in Opole
- 2009 – Dostoevsky's The Idiot, Jan Kochanowski Dramatic Theater in Opole
- 2009 – Iwaszkiewicz's The Maids of Wilko, Jan Kochanowski Dramatic Theater in Opole
- 2010 – Andersen's The Snow Queen, Jan Kochanowski Dramatic Theater in Opole
- 2013 – Lewis's The Lion, the Witch and the Wardrobe, Jan Kochanowski Dramatic Theater in Opole
- 2014 – Andersen's The Snow Queen, Teatr Polski in Warsaw

== Other ==
As a manager, he initiated cooperation with a number of important theatre festivals:

- Shakespeare's Globe in London
- Seoul Performing Arts Festival in Korea
- Tbilisi International Festival of Theatre in Georgia
- La MaMa Experimental Theatre Club in New York
- The Studio Players in Istanbul
- Teatr International Festival Minsk in Belarus
- Istanbul Theatre Festival in Turkey
- Uijeongbu International Music Theatre Festival in Korea
- Eurothalia Theatre Festival Timișoara in Romania

As director of the theatre in Opole he invited the cooperation of many famous artists like: Agnieszka Holland, Maja Kleczewska, Aleksandra Konieczna, Monika Strzępka, Michał Borczuch, Mikołaj Grabowski, Mikołaj Mikołajczyk, Paweł Passini, Jacek Poniedziałek, Anna Smolar, Cezary Tomaszewski and many others. He has enabled many theatrical debuts for people who have later become recognised artists, such as Krzysztof Garbaczewski, Paweł Świątek and Jędrzej Piaskowski.

== Sources ==
- Tomasz Konina in Polish Theatre Encyclopedia
- Tomasz Konina in e-teatr.pl
- Portal Operabase – list of Tomasz Konina opera productions
- List of Tomasz Konina productions in Polish National Opera Archives
- Portrait of Tomasz Konina in Dziennik Teatralny (first Polish theatre portal)
- Scores written by geniuses are always contemporary – conversation with Tomasz Konina (English version), Trubadur, 3(20)/2001
