= Semiramide =

1823 opera by Gioachino Rossini

- Opera by Gioachino Rossini
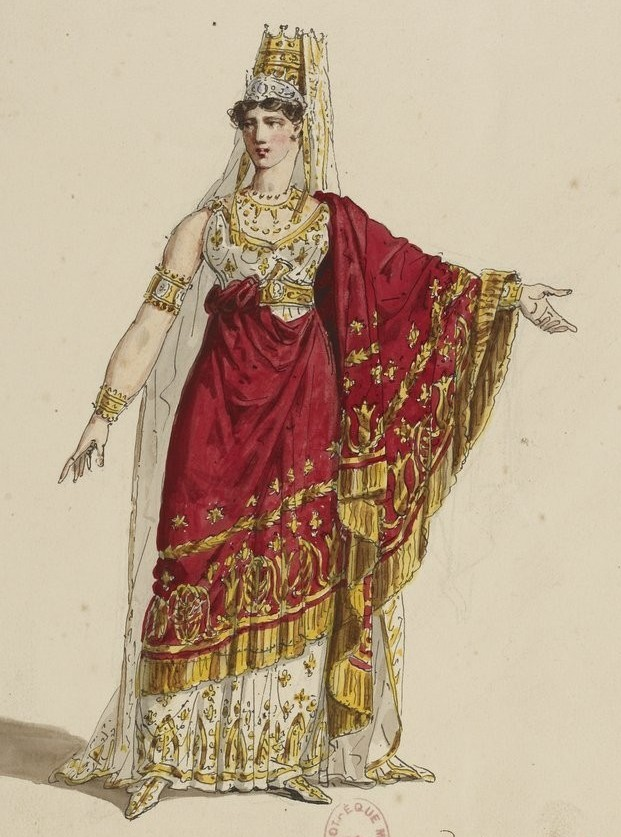
- Joséphine Fodor as Semiramide for the Paris performance in 1825
- Librettist: Gaetano Rossi
- Language: Italian
- Based on: Semiramis by Voltaire
- Premiere: 3 February 1823; La Fenice, Venice

Semiramide (Italian pronunciation: [semiˈraːmide]) is an opera in two acts by Gioachino Rossini. The libretto by Gaetano Rossi is based on Voltaire's tragedy Semiramis, which in turn was based on the legend of Semiramis of Assyria. The opera was first performed at La Fenice in Venice on 3 February 1823.

Semiramide was Rossini's final Italian opera and according to Richard Osborne, "could well be dubbed Tancredi Revisited". As in Tancredi, Rossi's libretto was based on a Voltaire tragedy. The music makes full use of a large pit orchestra, and was inspired by the vocal traditions of Rossini's youth. The opera is a melodrama in which Rossini "recreated the baroque tradition of decorative singing with unparalleled skill".

After the opera's completion, Rossini moved from Italy to Paris. Apart from Il viaggio a Reims, which is still in Italian, his last operas were either original compositions in French or extensively reworked adaptations into French of earlier Italian operas.

Musicologist Rodolfo Celletti sums up the importance of Semiramide by stating that it "was the last opera of the great Baroque tradition: the most beautiful, the most imaginative, possibly the most complete; but also, irremediably, the last."

== Composition history ==
After making his mark with a number of brilliant comic operas (most notably Il barbiere di Siviglia, La Cenerentola, Il turco in Italia, and L'italiana in Algeri), Rossini turned more and more to serious opera (opere serie). During the years 1813 (when Rossini composed Tancredi) until 1822 he wrote a considerable series of them, mostly for the Teatro di San Carlo, Naples.

One reason for his new interest in the serious genre was his connection with the great dramatic soprano Isabella Colbran, who was first his mistress, then his wife. She created the leading female roles in Elisabetta, regina d'Inghilterra (1815), Otello (1816), Armida (1817), Mosè in Egitto (1818), Maometto II (1820), and five other Rossini operas up to and including his final contribution to the genre, Semiramide, which was also written with Colbran in the major role.

Work began with the librettist in October 1822, composer and librettist taking Voltaire's story and making significant changes. Actual composition took Rossini 33 days to complete the score.

== Performance history ==
=== 19th century ===
Following its premiere, the opera was given twenty-eight times for the rest of the season in Venice (and, at some point, for four nights in a row) and it went on to presentations throughout Italy and Europe, including Paris in 1825, Milan in 1829 and 1831, and Vienna in 1830. It reached London on 15 July 1824, was given its US premiere at the St. Charles Theatre in New Orleans on 1 May 1837, but it took until 3 January 1845, before it was performed in New York.

Other prima donnas emerged in the major roles by about 1825, since Colbran's vocal powers had greatly diminished by the time of the Venice premiere performances and she "was in no state to ever sing the role again". For 25 years after 1830, Giulia Grisi triumphed in the role notably in St Petersburg in 1849 and New York in 1854.

By the late 1800s, the opera had virtually disappeared from the repertoire. However, it was chosen in 1880 to inaugurate the Teatro Costanzi, new venue of the Rome Opera company, and appeared as part of the Cincinnati Opera Festival 1882 which was attended by Oscar Wilde and which featured the famous diva Adelina Patti who chose the aria "Bel raggio lusinghiero" for her farewell performance. The Metropolitan Opera revived Semiramide in 1892, 1894 (with Nellie Melba), and 1895.

=== 20th century and beyond ===
It took until 1932 until the opera was again revived (in a German translation) in Rostock, and it then reappeared under Tullio Serafin at the 1940 Maggio Musicale Fiorentino.

Presentations at La Scala in Milan in December 1962 with Joan Sutherland and Giulietta Simionato required the re-assembly of the entire score from the Rossini autograph, since no other texts were known to exist.

Musicologist Philip Gossett noted that between 1962 and 1990 "some seventy opera houses have included the work in one or more seasons". A major revival at the Aix-en-Provence Festival in 1980 was directed by Pier Luigi Pizzi and featured Montserrat Caballé in the title role with Marilyn Horne as Arsace. The same staging was then billed in sequence by the Teatro Carlo Felice in Genoa and by the Teatro Regio in Turin which had co-produced it, starring respectively Lella Cuberli/Martine Dupuy and Katia Ricciarelli/Lucia Valentini Terrani. It was not until the Met's 1990 revival after almost 100 years that a production based on a new critical edition was mounted. It alternated Lella Cuberli and June Anderson in the title role with Marilyn Horne again as Arsace. Among other performances, the work was given by the Rossini in Wildbad Festival in 2012, which was recorded with Alex Penda in the title role. In November 2017, the Royal Opera House, London, mounted its first production of the opera since the 1890s, with Joyce DiDonato in the title role.

== Roles ==
Roles, voice types, premiere cast
Role	Voice type	Premiere cast, 3 February 1823 (Conductor: Antonio Cammerra)
Semiramide, Queen of Babylon, widow of King Nino	soprano	Isabella Colbran
Arsace, Commander of the Assyrian army	contralto	Rosa Mariani
Assur, a prince, descendant of Baal	bass	Filippo Galli
Idreno, an Indian king	tenor	John Sinclair
Oroe, high priest of the Magi	bass	Luciano Mariani
Azema, a princess, descendant of Baal	soprano	Matilde Spagna
Mitrane, Captain of the Guard	tenor	Gaetano Rambaldi
Nino's Ghost	bass	Natale Ciolli

== Synopsis ==
Time: Antiquity or "Some 2,000 Years before the Christian era"
Place: Babylon

Overture

Semiramide has its own overture, which was almost certainly composed last. Unlike many operatic overtures of the day, it borrowed musical ideas from the opera itself, thus making it unsuitable for use with another score. The range and balance of musical ideas, from the hushed, rhythmic opening through the Andantino for four horns (drawn from the opera itself) and the repetition with pizzicato countermelodies in the strings to the lively allegro, make the overture to Semiramide one of Rossini's finest contributions to the genre and deservedly one of the most popular.

=== Act 1 ===
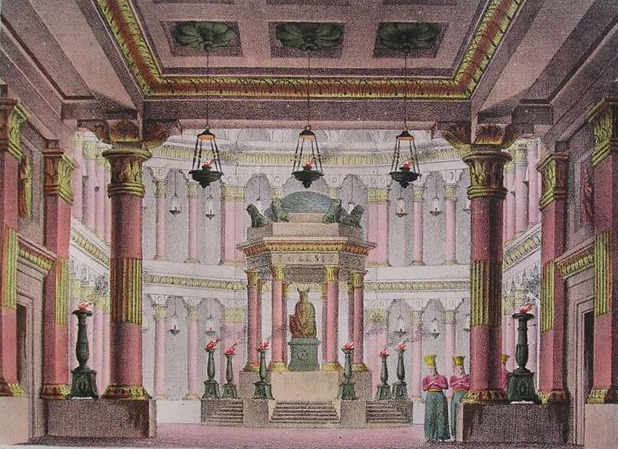
Interior of the Temple of Baal, Babylon (act 1, scene 1); set design by Alessandro Sanquirico for Semiramide staged at La Scala in Milan, 1824

Temple of Baal, Babylon

The High Priest Oroe invites all to enter the temple, and Babylonians (along with others from abroad, including Idreno the Indian King) do so carrying offerings to Baal. Assur states that the day has come for the Queen to choose a successor and he reminds all of his own valour. Idreno expresses surprise at Assur's aspirations and all express their individual concerns and fears.

Semiramide enters to the acclaim of all, but Idreno and Assur individually speculate as to who will be chosen. They press the queen to announce her decision, but at the same time Semiramide herself is fearful about making that decision, especially as she appears to be expecting someone's arrival. Suddenly, the temple is plunged into darkness and there is general consternation amidst fears of its imminent collapse. All desert the temple.

Arsace, a young warrior from Scythia, enters. He has been told by his dying father to go to the temple in Babylon, and he was also urgently sent for by Semiramide. He brings with him a casket belonging to his father, but he is puzzled as to why he has been called back to Babylon. He declares his love for Princess Azema who loves him though she has been promised to the dead King Nino's lost son, Ninia. Arsace states his unwillingness to support Assur in his bid for the throne: (Scena and aria: Eccomi alfine in Babilonia... Ah! quel giorno ognor rammento / "Here I am at last in Babylon... Oh, I shall ever remember the day of glory and happiness...").

Arsace asks to see the High Priest. Oroe enters, opens the casket, and exclaims upon seeing it that it contains the holy relics of the dead king. He hints to Arsace about some treachery that had been involved. Seeing Assur approach, Oroe leaves with the relics. Assur arrives and questions the reason for Arsace's return. The two men discuss Azema, with Arsace reaffirming his love for her (Duet: Bella imago degli dei / "Beautiful, divine image") while Assur states that he too loves her. "You have no idea what love is", the younger man tells the older: (Aria/duet: D'un tenero amor / "Of tender love...")

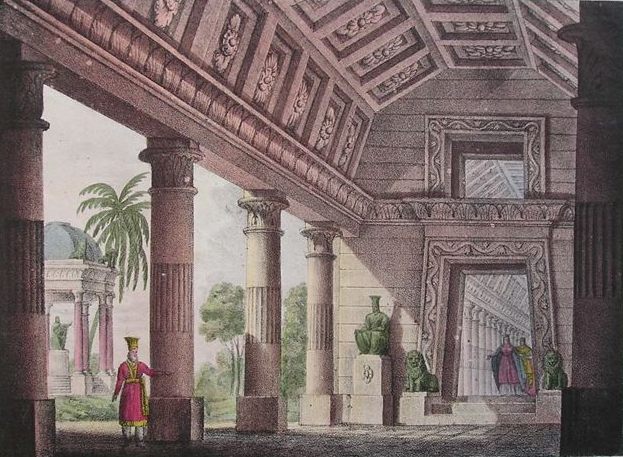
Entrance hall of the palace (act 1, scene 8); set design for Semiramide staged at La Scala in Milan, 1824

The entrance hall of the palace

Azema enters, happy that Arsace is now in Babylon. Idreno follows her and asks for her hand; she tells him that this must be Semiramide's decision. "What of your heart?" he asks, assuming that his rival can only be Assur. Scornfully told that it will never be Assur, Idreno is comforted, although he expresses his desire "to punish the wicked boldness of a rival" and continues to express desire for Azema: (Aria: Ah, dov'è, dov'è il cimento? / "Oh, where is it, where is the challenge?")

The Hanging Gardens

Having fallen in love with Arsace and believing that he loves her, Semiramide waits for his arrival: (Aria: Bel raggio lusinghier / "Beautiful, enchanting ray"). She receives a message from the Oracle, telling her that a wedding will make a new king. She believes this to be a sign from the gods that they approve of her plans, and orders preparations for a wedding. When Arsace arrives, he alludes to his love for Azema without specifically naming her, but he also declares that he will die for his queen if necessary. Semiramide still believes that he really loves her, and vows that she will give him all he desires: (Duet: Serbami ognor sì fido il cor / "Always keep your heart this faithful to me"). They leave separately.

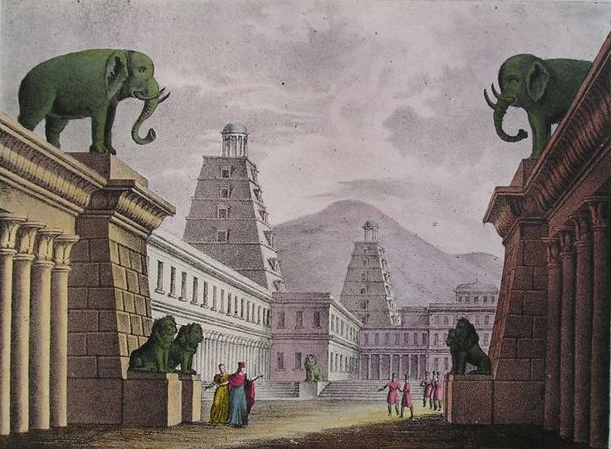
Set design for act 1, scene 13 of Semiramide staged at La Scala in Milan, 1824

The Palace Throne Room

All enter to await Semiramide's arrival and her announcement of her choice of successor. Arsace, Idreno, Oroe, and Assur all swear to obey her command, no matter what she decides: (Ensemble: Semiramide, Arsace, Idreno, Oroe and Assur: ( Giuri ognuno, a' sommi Dei / "Let everyone swear to the highest gods"). She demands loyalty to the man she chooses, stating he will also be her own husband. When Semiramide names Arsace as her chosen one, Assur is outraged and Idreno accepts the decision but requests Azema's hand, which is granted. After asking Oroe to unite her and Arsace, Semiramide is horrified by the uproar which emits from the near-by tomb of King Nino: (Ensemble: Qual mesto gemito da quella tomba / "What a mournful groaning from the tomb there"). All are horrified as King Nino's ghost appears, warning of the crimes to be expiated, telling Arsace that he will reign and to respect the High Priest's wisdom, and commanding him to come down into his tomb. Each character expresses their own anguish.

=== Act 2 ===
A hall in the palace

In a brief encounter, Mitrane warns the royal guard to keep Assur under surveillance and not to allow him to leave the palace. Then Semiramide enters, followed shortly after by Assur.

Conflict between the two soon emerges. She reminds him that it was he who gave the cup of poison to Nino, thus causing his death, and he reminds her that it was she who had prepared it: "Who handed me the cup of death?" he asks. Recalling that at that time she had a son, Ninia, she speculates that he might have been killed by the same man who killed Nino. Assur continues to pressure Semiramide to make him king. In turn, she threatens to reveal the crime, and they sing an extended duet: (Se la vita ancor t'è cara / "If you still hold life dear") recalling the terror and retribution that each could inflict upon the other if the truth came to light. Semiramide continues to demand that Assur acknowledge Arsace as his king.

Rejoicing is heard in the distance, and while Semiramide regains some of her former happiness, Assur becomes resigned to his fate.

King Nino's tomb

Oroe and the Magi are assembled in the tomb. The High Priest urges Arsace to come forward but makes him aware that there may be some unpleasant news awaiting him. Upon his arrival, Oroe tells him that he is Ninia, Nino's son, who had been saved by devoted Fradate and brought up as his own. Aghast at this news, Arsace then learns that Semiramide is his mother. To reinforce this news, Oroe hands him a scroll, written by the King before his death, the reading of which confirms the Priest's statements. The final blow comes when Arsace reads Nino's words, and realises that his mother and Assur were the ones who killed his father: "Assur was the traitor".

Almost collapsing in grief into Oroe's arms, he asks for comfort: (Aria: In sì barbara sciagura / "In such barbarious misfortune"), but the priests quickly reinforce his need to take immediate revenge. They equip him with armour and a sword and give him the determination to proceed: (cabaletta: Si, vendicato, il genitore / "Yes, my father avenged"). Sword in hand, Arsace leaves.

Semiramide's apartments

Azema and Mitrane are alone, the former complaining that she has lost everything now that Arsace, the love of her life, is due to marry the queen. Entering, Idreno overhears this and is distraught. Azema promises him her hand if he so desires it, but he wishes that she would love him: (Aria: La speranza più soave / "The sweetest hope"). Two choruses of Maids, Lords, and Indians lead them all to the temple.

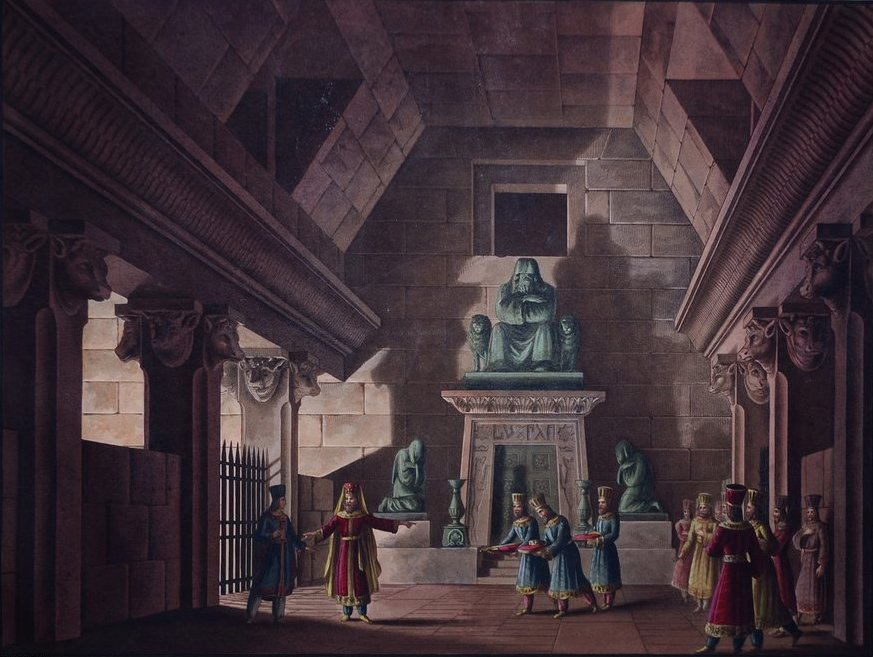
Ìnterior of the temple; set design for act 2, scene 4 of Semiramide staged at La Scala in Milan, 1824

In the temple

Semiramide confronts Arsace, who finally hands her the scroll which has revealed all. Horrified, she then understands Arsace's real identity, and becomes remorseful, offering herself to his revengeful blows. He swears filial loyalty, expressing the wish to spare his mother: (Duet: Ebben, a te, ferisci! ... Giorno d'orror! E di contento! ... Madre, addio! / "Behold, you, strike me! ... Day of horror, and of joy! ... Mother, adieu!"). Together, they each accept the reality, but Arsace declares that he must go to his father's tomb and take whatever action is necessary. Knowing what is in store, Semiramide urges him to "return to me victorious".

The entrance to the sepulchre of King Ninus

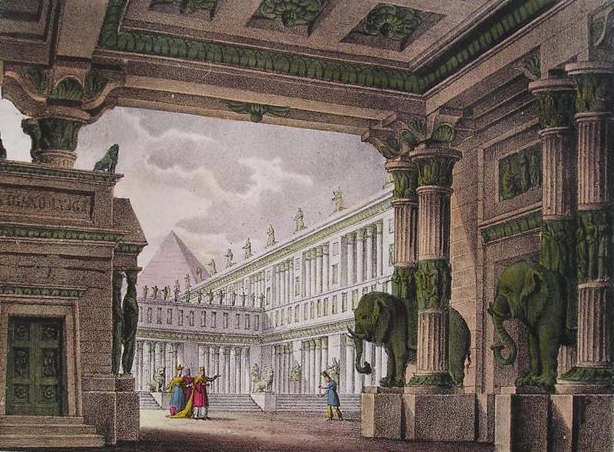
Adjacent to Nino's tomb. Set design by Alessandro Sanquirico for Semiramide staged at La Scala in Milan, 1824

Defiantly, Assur enters and proclaims that this will be Arsace's last day on earth. Learning from his men that the people have turned against him, he still vows to kill Arsace. He moves towards the tomb only to find some unknown force, some apparition holding him back: (Chorus, scena and aria: Deh ti ferma ... Que' numi furenti, Quell'ombre frementi / "Oh, stop ... Those wrathful gods, those quivering shades"). His men urge him on, but still the apparition remains in his mind. His men are puzzled, until he seems to recover and then, with his men beside him, vows to fight on.

Finale - Inside the sepulchre of Ninus

Along with Oroe, Arsace enters the vaults. He searches for his rival. Assur enters as well, also searching for Arsace. Semiramide then comes in to pray at Nino's tomb, asking for forgiveness and protection for her son: (Solo: Al mio pregar t'arrendi: il figlio tuo difendi / "Yield to my prayer: protect your son"). In the confusion of the darkness, all three – Arsace, Semiramide, and Assur – express some bewilderment as to the loss of their courage at this crucial moment: (Trio: L'usato ardir / "My former valour"). But in the darkness and seeking to strike Assur, Arsace strikes Semiramide as she steps between them to forestall her erstwhile accomplice. Surprised to learn Arsace's real identity, Assur is arrested, Semiramide dies, and to general acclaim by the people, Arsace reluctantly accepts that he shall be King.

== Recordings ==
Year	Cast: (Semiramide, Arsace, Assur, Idreno)	Conductor, opera house and orchestra	Label
1965/66	Joan Sutherland, Marilyn Horne, Joseph Rouleau, John Serge	Richard Bonynge, London Symphony Orchestra and the Ambrosian Opera Chorus	CD: Decca; Cat: 475 7918
1980	Montserrat Caballé, Marilyn Horne, Samuel Ramey, Francisco Araiza	Jesús López Cobos, Scottish Chamber Orchestra and Aix en Provence Festival Chorus (Audio and video recordings of performance(s) at the Aix-en-Provence Festival	CD: Premiere Opera Ltd, Cat: CDNO 161-2; DVD: Encore; DVD 2258
1990	June Anderson, Marilyn Horne, Samuel Ramey, Stanford Olsen	James Conlon, Metropolitan Opera Orchestra and Chorus (Audio and video recording of a performance at the MET)	CD: Celestial Audio; Cat: CA 135; DVD: ArtHaus Musik; Cat: 100 222
1992	Iano Tamar, Gloria Scalchi, Michele Pertusi, Gregory Kunde	Alberto Zedda, Orchestra of the Teatro Communale, Bologna and Prague Philharmonic Chorus (Recording of the critical edition at a performance at the Rossini Opera Festival in Pesaro)	CD: Ricordi/Fonit Cetra; Cat: RFCD 2018
1992	Cheryl Studer, Jennifer Larmore, Samuel Ramey, Frank Lopardo	Ion Marin, London Symphony Orchestra and Ambrosian Opera Chorus	CD: Deutsche Grammophon; Cat: 437 797-2
1998	Edita Gruberová, Bernadette Manca di Nissa, Ildebrando D'Arcangelo; Juan Diego Flórez	Marcello Panni, Radio Symphony Orchestra, Vienna and Wiener Konzertchor (Recording of a concert performance in the Wiener Konzerthaus, 14 March)	CD: Nightingale Classics; Cat: NC 207013-2
2004	Ángeles Blancas, Daniela Barcellona, Ildar Abdrazakov, Antonino Siragusa	Alberto Zedda, Teatro Real, Madrid Orchestra and Chorus (Video recording of a performance in the Teatro Real, Madrid, April)	DVD: Encore; DVD 2731
2011	Myrtò Papatanasiu, Ann Hallenberg, Josef Wagner, Robert McPherson	Alberto Zedda, Symfonisch Orkest van de Vlaamse Opera & Koor van de Vlaamse Opera (Recording of a concert performance at the Vlaamse Opera Gent, Belgium, 11 January)	CD: Dynamic; Cat: 55674; DVD: Dynamic; Cat: 33674
2012	Alex Penda, Marianna Pizzolato, Lorenzo Regazzo, John Osborn	Antonino Fogliani, Virtuosi Brunensis and the Poznan Camerata Bach Choir, (Recorded at the Rossini in Wildbad Festival, 2012)	CD: Naxos Records, Cat: 8660340-42
2018	Albina Shagimuratova, Daniela Barcellona, Mirco Palazzi, Barry Banks	Sir Mark Elder, Orchestra of the Age of Enlightenment and Opera Rara Chorus	CD: Opera Rara, Cat: ORC57
