= Il viaggio a Reims =

1825 opera by Gioachino Rossini

- Dramma giocoso by Gioachino Rossini
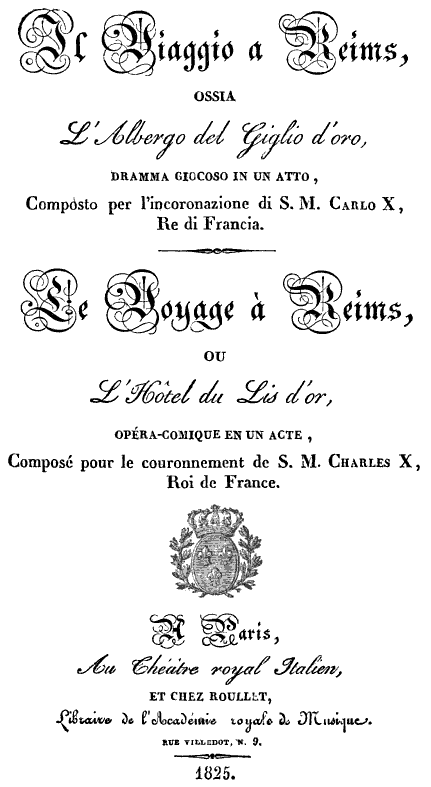
- Title page of the libretto
- Librettist: Luigi Balocchi
- Language: Italian
- Based on: Corinne ou l'Italie by Germaine de Staël
- Premiere: 19 June 1825; Théâtre Italien, Paris

Il viaggio a Reims, ossia L'albergo del giglio d'oro (The Journey to Reims, or The Hotel of the Golden Fleur-de-lis) is an operatic dramma giocoso, originally performed in three acts, by Gioachino Rossini to an Italian libretto by Luigi Balocchi, based in part on the 1807 novel Corinne ou l'Italie by Germaine de Staël.

Rossini's last opera in the Italian language (all of his later works were in French) premiered under the title Le voyage à Reims, ou l'Hôtel du Lys-d'Or. It was commissioned to celebrate the coronation of French King Charles X in Reims in May 1825 and has been acclaimed as one of Rossini's finest compositions. A demanding work, it requires 14 soloists (three sopranos, one contralto, two tenors, four baritones, and four basses). At its premiere, it was sung by the greatest voices of the day.

Since the opera was written for a specific occasion, with a plot about European aristocrats, officers – and one poetess – en route to join in the French coronation festivities that the opera itself was composed for, Rossini never intended it to have a life beyond a few performances in Paris. He later re-used about half of the music in Le comte Ory.

Il viaggio a Reims does not have an overture. Its so-called overture, derived from a set of dances in Le siège de Corinthe (1826), one of which Rossini had reworked from the dances in the finale to Il viaggio a Reims, is a twentieth-century invention or an erroneous attribution. It was published in Milan, in 1938, in a revision by Giuseppe Piccioli, which was first performed in the Teatro alla Scala, on 5 November 1938, conducted by Richard Strauss. It was later also recorded repeatedly as the alleged overture of Il viaggio a Reims, until it was finally possible to reconstruct the original score of the opera. The attributed overture remains one of Rossini's most recorded works.

== Performance history ==
Il viaggio a Reims was first performed at the Théâtre Italien's Salle Louvois, Paris, on 19 June 1825, with Giuditta Pasta as Corinna. There were only four original performances. It was expensive to stage, but Rossini resisted moving it to the larger Salle Lepeletier with the potential of raising more money, because he had learned that his operas Mosè in Egitto and La donna del lago were more effective in smaller theatres.

The different parts of the manuscript, assumed lost, were re-found and re-assembled in the 1970s by the musicologist Janet Johnson, with the help of Philip Gossett.

The first performance after the reconstruction was given at the Rossini Opera Festival on 18 August 1984. It was conducted by Claudio Abbado and directed by Luca Ronconi. The cast included Francisco Araiza (Conte di Libenskof), Lella Cuberli (Contessa di Folleville), Enzo Dara (Barone di Trombonok), Cecilia Gasdia (Corinna), Eduardo Gimenez (Cavalier Belfiore), William Matteuzzi (Zefirino), Leo Nucci (Don Alvaro), Ruggero Raimondi (Don Profondo), Samuel Ramey (Lord Sidney), Katia Ricciarelli (Madama Cortese), and Lucia Valentini Terrani (Marchesa Melibea).

Other performances have followed. The American premiere was given on 14 June 1986 by Opera Theatre of Saint Louis at the Loretto-Hilton Theater in St. Louis, directed by Colin Graham and conducted by Richard Buckley. In 1992, The Royal Opera, London, gave several performances: Carlo Rizzi conducted, and the cast included Montserrat Caballé, Renée Fleming, Sylvia McNair, John Aler and Andrew Shore. In Helsinki, on 9 January 2003, the opera was directed by Dario Fo and conducted by Pietro Rizzo.

The Polish premiere was given in April 2003, directed by Tomasz Konina, with, among others, Ewa Podleś as Marchesa Melibea and Rockwell Blake as Count Libenskoff (Alberto Zedda conducted).

In November 2005 there was another production in Monte Carlo, with a cast including June Anderson, Raùl Gimenez, Rockwell Blake, and Ruggero Raimondi. The Wiener Staatsoper produced the opera in its Rossini Festival conducted by Claudio Abbado, with Montserrat Caballé and again Ruggero Raimondi. The Kirov Opera performed it at the Kennedy Center in Washington, DC, in January 2007. The work was produced in Tel Aviv by the Israeli Opera in November 2007. The African premiere was presented by the University of Cape Town in collaboration with Cape Town Opera in 2010. The South American premiere was presented by the Teatro Argentino de La Plata, Argentina, in 2011. During the 2011/12 season, productions were given by the Vlaamse Opera in Antwerp in December, where the action took place inside a jumbo jet, and at the Teatro Comunale, Florence, in January where the action was staged in an early 20th-century luxury spa. Damiano Michieletto directed the opera, set in an art gallery, for the Dutch National Opera in 2015 and for the Royal Danish Opera in 2017. This production was also used for the Australian premiere at the Arts Centre Melbourne and the Sydney Opera House in 2019 for Opera Australia with Teddy Tahu Rhodes, Conal Coad, John Longmuir; Daniel Smith conducted the Orchestra Victoria.

== Roles ==
Roles, voice types, premiere cast
Role	Voice type	Premiere cast, 19 June 1825 Conductor: Gioacchino Rossini
Madame Cortese, Tyrolean hostess of the spa hotel	soprano	Ester Mombelli
Contessa di Folleville, a fashionable young widow	soprano	Laure Cinti-Damoreau
Corinna, a famous Roman poetess	soprano	Giuditta Pasta
Marchesa Melibea, the Polish widow of an Italian general killed on their wedding night	contralto	Adelaide Schiassetti
Conte di Libenskof, Russian general in love with Marchesa Melibea	tenor	Marco Bordogni
Chevalier Belfiore, handsome young French officer and spare-time painter	tenor	Domenico Donzelli
Lord Sidney, English colonel secretly in love with Corinna	bass	Carlo Zucchelli
Don Alvaro, Spanish admiral in love with Marchesa Melibea	bass	Nicolas Levasseur
Barone di Trombonok, German major and music lover	bass	Vincenzo Graziani
Don Profondo, scholar and lover of antiquities, friend of Corinna	bass	Felice Pellegrini
Don Prudenzio, doctor at the spa	bass	Luigi Profeti
Modestina, the Contessa di Folleville's chamber maid	mezzo-soprano	Marietta Dotti
Don Luigino, cousin of the Contessa di Folleville	tenor	Piero Scudo
Maddalena, hotel housekeeper from Normandy	mezzo-soprano	Caterina Rossi
Antonio, maître d'hotel	baritone	Auletta
Zefirino, courier	tenor	Giovanola
Gelsomino, valet	tenor	Trévaux
Delia, young Greek girl who is Corinna's travelling companion	soprano	Maria Amigo
Four strolling players, chorus of countrymen and women, gardeners, hotel staff, dancers, servants

== Synopsis ==
Place: The Golden Lily spa hotel at Plombières-les-Bains in France
Time: 1825

=== Act 1 ===
Scene 1: Introduction

The housekeeper Maddalena is unhappy with the preparations made by the servants for the arrival of the important people who are travelling to Reims for the coronation of Charles X of France. ("Presto, presto ... su, corraggio") The servants repudiate her assertions. The hotel's doctor, Don Prudenzio, announces that, because of the impending arrivals, the normal business of the spa will be suspended. The spa attendants rejoice and depart. He checks with Antonio that his instructions about the necessary meals for the visitors have been followed.

Madame Cortese, the proprietress of the hotel, appears. She regrets that she will be unable to attend the coronation ("Di vaghi raggi adorno"), but is keen to show off the hotel to the visitors in the hope that they will return some day to take the waters. She particularly requests that everyone should be enthusiastic about each of the travellers' specific interests. Everyone agrees, and she is left alone.

Scene 2: The Countess of Folleville's arrival

The Countess calls for her maid, Modestina, and Madame Cortese goes to search for her. Modestina appears, and the Countess, worried that her clothes have not yet arrived, asks why there has been no reply to a letter that she had sent. Modestina had entrusted the letter to the Countess's cousin, Don Luigino, who immediately arrives to say that the stagecoach which he had hired to carry the boxes had overturned on the way. The Countess faints and Don Luigino calls for help.

Maddalena, Antonio, Don Prudenzio and the servants arrive, together with Baron Trombonok. Don Prudenzio and the Baron argue about how to resuscitate the Countess, but she recovers sufficiently to lament the loss of her garments. ("Partir, o ciel! desio") However, when Modestina appears with a large box containing a beautiful Paris bonnet, she rejoices that it, at least, has been saved from the accident. ("Che miro! Ah! Quel sorpresa!") Everyone is amused by this sudden turn of events, and all except Antonio and the Baron depart.

Scene 3: Sextet

After agreeing with the Baron the arrangements for the party's departure in the evening, Antonio leaves. The Baron cannot help laughing at the Countess's sudden recovery and the insanity of the world in general. He is joined by Don Profondo, Don Alvaro, the Marquise Melibea, Count Libenskof. It is clear that Don Alvaro and the Count are rivals for the Marquise's affections. They are all waiting for the new horses which will be necessary for the continuation of the journey, but Madame Cortese, who now arrives, says that she cannot understand why they have not arrived. Alvaro and Libenskof quarrel, the ladies are alarmed, and the Baron and Don Profondo are amused by the idiocy of lovers. ("Non pavento alcun periglio")

A harp prelude is heard, and the poetess Corinna sings offstage of brotherly love, to everyone's delight. ("Arpa gentil")

=== Act 2 ===
Scene 1: Lord Sidney's aria

Madame Cortese is still waiting for the return of her servant Gelsomino with news of the horses. Lord Sidney approaches, and she muses on his unwillingness to approach Corinna who, she is sure, reciprocates his love.

Sidney, alone, laments his situation. ("Invan strappar dal core") His mood lifts when girls singing in praise of Corinna enter with flowers, but then he is disturbed by Don Profondo's strange requests for information about the location of antiquities, and departs.

Scene 2: Corinna's duet with the Chevalier Belfiore

Profondo is joined by Corinna and her companion Delia. Corinna asks when the party is to depart, and he and Delia leave Corinna alone while they go to see whether the horses have arrived.

Corinna is joined by the Chevalier, who declares his love. ("Nel suo divin sembiante") She is taken aback and repudiates him. The Chevalier retreats, hoping to try again later, and Corinna returns to her room.

Scene 3: Don Profondo's aria

Don Profondo, who has seen the Chevalier with Corinna, reflects that the Countess will scratch the Chevalier's eyes out if she finds out what he has been doing. He then turns his attention to enumerating the effects of his fellow-travellers (as requested by the Baron), noting that their possessions tend to sum up each of their nations' characteristics. ("Medaglie incomparabili") He looks forward to the impending departure.

The Countess appears, looking for the Chevalier. She is not pleased when Don Profondo tells her that he has been having a poetry lesson. Don Alvaro and Count Libenskof join them, asking about the horses, and the Baron, too, appears, looking woebegone. What has happened? The rest of the travellers arrive, and the Baron produces the courier Zefirino, who is obliged to report that there are no horses to be had anywhere, not even for ready money. There will be no journey to Reims for the coronation!

Scene 4: Grand concerted ensemble for 14 voices

Everyone is horrified. ("Ah! A tal colpo inaspettato") But Madame Cortese appears with a letter from Paris. Don Profondo reads it out: the King will return from Reims in a few days and there will be great festivities. Anyone who was unable to get to Reims will be consoled by an even finer spectacle. The Countess steps forward to invite the entire company to her home in Paris for the celebrations. A stagecoach will convey them there on the following day, but in the meantime a grand banquet, with invitations to the public, will be held at the Golden Lily, paid for with the money that would have been spent at the coronation. Any money left over will be given to the poor.

=== Act 3 ===
Scene 1: Duet for the Count and the Marquise

When everyone else has left, the Baron tries to reconcile the jealous Count with the Marquise, who has been seen with Don Alvaro. When he departs, the misunderstanding is resolved and harmony is restored. ("D'alma celeste, oh Dio!")

They depart, and the scene changes to the hotel's garden. Antonio and Maddalena ensure that all is prepared for the banquet. The Baron has engaged a travelling company to provide entertainment with singing and dancing.

Scene 2: Finale

After the opening chorus ("L'allegria è un sommo bene"), the Baron introduces a series of short national songs sung by each of the travellers, some of them set to well-known tunes (Gott erhalte Franz den Kaiser and God Save the King), and ending with, first, a French song (praising the Duchesse de Berry) sung by the Countess Folleville and the Chevalier Belfiore, then a rustic Tyrolean duet for Madame Cortese and Don Profondo, and finally an improvised solo for Corinna on one of a number of mostly French subjects suggested by each traveller and drawn from an urn. The winning subject turns out, appropriately enough, to be "Charles X, King of France". The opera ends with a chorus ("Viva il diletto augusto regnator" to the tune of the Marche Henri IV).

== Recordings ==
Year	Cast: Corinna, Marchesa Melibea, Contessa di Folleville, Madame Cortese, Cavalier Belfiore, Conte di Libenskof, Lord Sidney, Don Profondo, Baron di Trombonok, Don Alvaro	Conductor, opera house and orchestra	Label
1984	Cecilia Gasdia, Lucia Valentini Terrani, Lella Cuberli, Katia Ricciarelli, Eduardo Giménez, Francisco Araiza, Samuel Ramey, Ruggero Raimondi, Enzo Dara, Leo Nucci	Claudio Abbado, Chamber Orchestra of Europe and Prague Philharmonic Chorus, Recorded at the Rossini Festival, Pesaro	CD: DGG, Cat: 415 498-4
1992	Sylvia McNair, Lucia Valentini-Terrani, Luciana Serra, Cheryl Studer, Raúl Giménez, William Matteuzzi, Samuel Ramey, Ruggero Raimondi, Enzo Dara, Lucio Gallo	Claudio Abbado, Berlin Philharmonic and Rundfunkchor Berlin	CD: Sony Classical, Cat: S2K 53 336
2003	Elena de la Merced, Paula Rasmussen, Mariola Cantarero, María Bayo, José Bros, Kenneth Tarver, Simón Orfila, Nicola Ulivieri, Enzo Dara, Àngel Òdena	Jesús López-Cobos, Orchestra and Chorus of Gran Teatre del Liceu, Barcelona	DVD: TDK, Cat: DVUSOPVAR
2005	Irma Guigolachvili, Anna Kiknadze, Larissa Youdina, Anastasia Belyaeva, Dmitri Voropaev, Daniil Shtoda, Edouard Tsanga, Nikolaï Kamenski, Vladislav Ouspenski, Alexeï Safiouline	Valery Gergiev, Orchestra and Chorus of the Mariinsky Theatre, Saint Petersburg, with singers from the Academy of Young Singers of the Mariinsky Theatre. (Recording of a performance at the Théâtre du Châtelet, Paris, December)	DVD: Opus Arte, Cat: OA 0967 D
2016	Laura Giordano, Marianna Pizzolato, Sofia Mchedlishvili, Alessandra Marianelli, Bogdan Mihai, Maxim Mironov, Mirco Palazzi, Bruno De Simone, Bruno Praticò, Gezim Myshketa	Antonino Fogliani, Virtuosi Brunensis, Camerata Bach Choir, Poznań; Recorded live at the Rossini in Wildbad Festival	CD: Naxos Records; Cat: 8660382-84
