= Philip Gossett =

American musicologist (1941–2017)

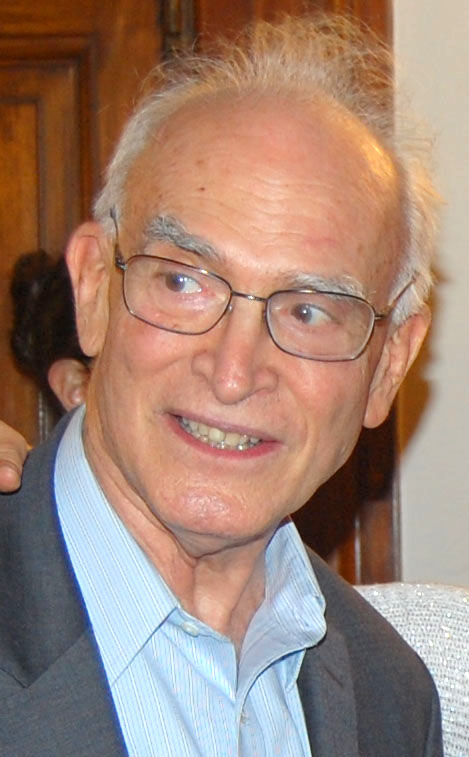
- Born: September 27, 1941; New York
- Died: June 12, 2017 (aged 75); Chicago, Illinois
- Education: Princeton University
- Occupations: Musicologist, historian

Philip Gossett (September 27, 1941 – June 12, 2017) was an American musicologist and historian, and Robert W. Reneker Distinguished Service Professor of Music at the University of Chicago. His lifelong interest in 19th-century Italian opera began with listening to Metropolitan Opera broadcasts in his youth. Divas and Scholars: Performing Italian Opera, a major work on the subject, won the Otto Kinkeldey Award of the American Musicological Society as best book on music of 2006.

Philip Gossett's contributions to opera scholarship and how they can influence operatic performance may best be summed up by Newsday's comment that "some encomiasts claim that soprano Maria Callas did as much for Italian opera as Arturo Toscanini or Verdi. Musicologist Philip Gossett arguably has done as much for Italian opera as any of those geniuses."

== Career ==
Gossett earned degrees from the Juilliard School, Amherst College, and Princeton University. He studied in Paris on a Fulbright Scholarship. At the time he began graduate musical studies in the mid-1960s, the Italian composers such as Gioachino Rossini, Vincenzo Bellini, Gaetano Donizetti and Giuseppe Verdi had been given little serious academic study. As he noted: "If you were going to be a serious musicologist, you had to study Beethoven or Bach or Gregorian chants, but Rossini -- that was a pretty funny idea" However, he persisted and notes that "I went to Princeton University for graduate work in musicology (and) I fell more in love with the music and wrote my doctoral dissertation on the music of Rossini, Bellini, Donizetti, and Verdi. Then I went to Paris on a Fulbright and studied Rossini's operas."

Throughout his career, Gossett's work frequently took him to Italy, where he advised on the presentations of productions at the Rossini Opera Festival in Rossini's hometown of Pesaro, and worked directly with the Istituto Nazionale di Studi Verdiani (Institute of Verdi Studies) in Parma, which was founded in 1960. Also, for the 2001 centenary of Verdi's death, he worked with the Teatro Regio di Parma on their programming. In 1968 he joined the faculty of the University of Chicago where he taught until his retirement in 2010 and served as dean of the Division of the Humanities from 1989 to 1999. He was professor emeritus there at the time of his death in 2017.

== Critical editions of Verdi and Rossini operas ==
Given that Gossett's musical interests focussed on 19th-century Italian opera (especially the works of Rossini, Bellini, Donizetti, and Verdi), most of his career was devoted to being General Editor of two important projects while at the University of Chicago: the research for the preparation of critical editions of all the operas of both Rossini (some 70) and Verdi (some 33, in their various forms). These are being prepared and gradually published as The Works of Giuseppe Verdi (by the University of Chicago Press in collaboration with the Italian publishing house Casa Ricordi of Milan) and as Works of Gioachino Rossini (by Bärenreiter Verlag, Kassel).

In an interview, Gossett explained what he means by the term "critical edition":

By critical edition of an opera I have always meant an edition that bases itself wherever possible on the very finest and most accurate sources for an opera. That means that it must study the entire performance history of a work. In some cases of course we have an autograph manuscript, and that helps us, but it is also where many of the problems start, because composers are known to have made mistakes in their autograph manuscripts. And therefore we are required – we feel it is necessary – to intervene and to correct errors that sometimes have been perpetrated on these works by printed editions from the beginning, so they are just mistakes in the old editions, simple mistakes.

Elsewhere, he explained the overall aim of the production of critical editions of the operas by using the example of Rossini's Il viaggio a Reims:

We used sources in Rome, Paris, Vienna, and New York. The scores reprinted cheaply today simply reproduce all the errors, all the faults of these 19th-century scores—most of which were produced very quickly and, in Verdi's own words, "are filled with errors." ... The new critical editions have tried, for the first time, to return to authentic sources and they allow performers to have access to the various versions sanctioned by the composers.

As he has explained, Gossett does not believe that singers need to base their interpretations entirely on everything contained in a critical edition. His aim is "that performers should base their work on the finest editions possible, and that’s what we try to produce".

As of 2004, it was noted that "Gossett's team (had) completed 12 of 33 projected volumes of Verdi's work and more than 30 volumes of an expected 70 for Rossini. 'I'll never get through the Rossini,' Gossett said. 'But the Verdi – I'm hoping.'" However, in July 2013, the University of Chicago's "Verdi Critical Edition - Available Titles" page shows 17 opera titles by Verdi and 9 Rossini opera titles currently available or planned for publication by Bärenreiter Verlag. However, this is in addition to the 26 Rossini operas for which critical editions have been prepared by the Rossini Foundation under Gossett's general direction.

However, he is on record as denying that the Claudio Scimone edition of Maometto II is a critical edition in the true sense of the word, but is more a performing edition by Scimone as conductor.

Rossini's Tancredi, Ermione and Semiramide are three critical editions which he has personally edited, while his most recent work is Verdi's La forza del destino which, while yet to be formally published, was performed at the San Francisco Opera in November 2005 in its 1869 version. The 1862 version was presented in the Stadttheater, Bern in April 2006.

=== Work with US opera companies ===
In the US, he has consulted with the Houston Grand Opera (in 1979 for the first production of the critical edition of Tancredi, with its then newly discovered tragic ending, starring Marilyn Horne). He has worked three times with the Metropolitan Opera: for its November 1990 production of Semiramide; for its 1993 production of Stiffelio; and for its 1997 production of La cenerentola. He has also worked with The Santa Fe Opera in 2000 for Rossini's Ermione; and with Chicago Opera Theater for the first presentations of Rossini's long-lost Il viaggio a Reims in 2003. Gossett again acted as consultant to The Santa Fe Opera during rehearsals for its 2012 season production of the new critical edition of Rossini's original Maometto II of 1820 and he returned in the same capacity during rehearsals of the company's new production of Rossini's La donna del lago during the 2013 season.

For the 2010 presentations of Verdi's Attila for the Met, Gossett also worked with conductor Riccardo Muti on revisions to the score based on new research. This has become a new critical edition of the opera.

Muti has acknowledged Gossett's role in clarifying ambiguities (in this case in Rigoletto) which had crept into many texts.

== Awards and honors ==
He received the Quantrell Award in 1974. Gossett was awarded the Andrew W. Mellon Foundation's "Distinguished Achievement Award" in 2004, which gained him a prize of $1.5 million to facilitate his research. Also, in 1998, the Italian government gave him the "Cavaliere di Gran Croce", the highest honor that can be awarded to a civilian. Academically, he has been President of the American Musicological Society and of the Society for Textual Scholarship, as well as Dean of the Division of the Humanities at the University of Chicago. In 2008 Gossett was appointed foreign member of the Royal Swedish Academy of Music.

== Publications ==
=== Books ===
- 1971: The Operas of Rossini: Problems of Textual Criticism in Nineteenth-Century Opera (thesis/dissertation). OCLC 251748514, 1061802.
- 1971: Treatise on Harmony by Jean Philippe Rameau, edited and translated by Philip Gossett. New York: Dover. ISBN 978-0-486-22461-9.
- 1978: Early romantic Opera: Bellini, Rossini, Meyerbeer, Donizetti, and Grand Opera in Paris, edited with introductions by Philip Gossett and Charles Rosen. New York: Garland. OCLC 225747929.
- 1983: "Gioachino Rossini" in The New Grove Masters of Italian Opera: Rossini, Donizetti, Bellini, Verdi, Puccini. New York: W. W. Norton, 1983. ISBN 978-0-393-30361-2.
- 1983: "I Puritani: Melodramma Serio in Three Acts, First Performance: Paris, Theatre-Italien, January 24, 1835 (a facsimile edition of Bellini's original autograph manuscript together With the Naples revision, 2 volumes. Complete by Pepoli, Carlo (Libretto); Vincenzo Bellini (Music); Philip Gossett (Ed, Intro). Garland Publishing. ISBN 978-0-8240-2905-0.
- 1985: Anna Bolena and the Artistic Maturity of Gaetano Donizetti (Studies in Musical Genesis and Structure) by Philip Gossett, 1985) Oxford University Press, 1985 ISBN 978-0-19-313205-4.
- 2006: Divas and Scholars: Performing Italian Opera. Chicago: University of Chicago. ISBN 978-0-226-30482-3.
- 2014: Jean-Philippe Rameau: His Life and Work by Cuthbert Girdlestone, with an introduction by Philip Gossett. Mineola, New York: Dover. ISBN 9780486492230.

=== Critical editions ===
- The works of Gioachino Rossini, Series I: Operas
  - "L'occasione fa il ladro" by Gioachino Rossini, edited by Giovanni Carli Ballola, Patricia Brauner, and Philip Gossett, 1994. OCLC 496006140
  - "La gazzetta" by Gioachino Rossini, Vol. 18, (Eds.) Philip Gossett and Fabrizio Scipioni, Pesaro, Fondazione Rossini, 2002. ISBN 978-0-226-72864-3 (First performed at Garsington Opera (Oxford) and the Rossini Opera Festival (Pesaro), summer 2001.
  - "Semiramide" by Gioachino Rossini: Melodramma tragico in Two Acts, Libretto by Gaetano Rossi, Vol. 34, (Eds.) Philip Gossett, and Alberto Zedda Pesaro, Fondazione Rossini, 2001.
  - "Ermione" by Gioachino Rossini, edited by Patricia B. Brauner and Philip Gossett, 2006. ISBN 9788875927806.
  - "Tancredi" by Gioachino Rossini: Melodramma eroico in Two Acts by Gaetano Rossi. Vol. 10, (Ed.) Philip Gossett, 2010
  - "Maometto II", Dramma per musica in two acts by Cesare Della Valle. The Santa Fe Opera presented the first performances of this brand new critical edition prepared by Dutch scholar Hans Schellevis and to be published in 2015 by Bärenreiter Verlag of Kassel under the General Editorship of Philip Gossett, who was present during rehearsals as advisor.
  - "Il barbiere di Siviglia" by Gioachino Rossini (in preparation)
- The Works of Giuseppe Verdi, Series I: Operas.
  - "Ernani" by Giuseppe Verdi: Dramma Lirico in Four Acts By Francesco Maria Piave, (Eds.) Claudio Gallico and (Trans.) Philip Gossett. University Of Chicago Press, 1985 ISBN 978-0-226-85307-9
  - "La forza del destino" by Giuseppe Verdi, to be published

=== Selected articles ===
- Gossett, Phillip (Summer 1989). "Carl Dahlhaus and the "Ideal Type"". 19th-Century Music. 13 (1). University of California Press: 49–56. doi:10.2307/746211. JSTOR 746211.

== See also ==
Musicologist Roger Parker, General Editor of The Critical Edition of the Operas of Gaetano Donizetti (Casa Ricordi, Milan)
