= Adelaide Malanotte =

Italian opera singer

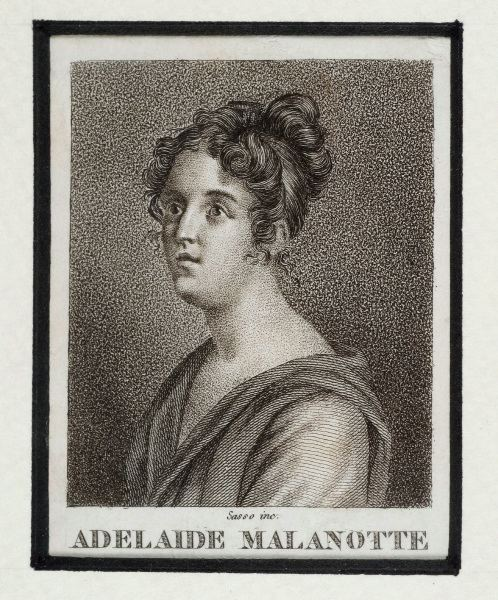
Print of Adelaide Malanotte by Giovanni Antonio Sasso (c. 1810)

Adelaide Malanotte (1785 – 31 December 1832) was an Italian operatic contralto who performed in major opera houses in Italy from 1806 to 1821. She is best known for creating the title role in the world premiere of Gioachino Rossini's Tancredi in 1813. After her marriage, she performed under the name Adelaide Montresor. Her son, Giovanni Battista Montresor, had a career as a tenor and impresario in the United States. From 1812 until her death 20 years later she carried on an extra-marital affair with the poet Luigi Lechi.

== Life and career ==
Born in Verona, Malanotte made her professional opera debut in her native city in 1806. In 1808 she was heard at the Teatro Comunale di Bologna as Ariodante in Simon Mayr's Ginevra di Scozia. In 1809 she performed the role of Enrico in the world premiere of Stefano Pavesi's Elisabetta regina d'Inghilterra at the Teatro Regio di Torino. She returned to that theatre the following year to perform the role of Itaferne in the premiere of Giuseppe Nicolini's Dario Istaspe. She also appeared at the Teatro Valle in Rome in 1810 in the premiere of Nicola Antonio Manfroce's Alzira.

In 1811 Malanotte made appearances at the opera house in Ravenna and sang in Alzira again at the opera house in Monza. In 1812 she sang at La Fenice in the title role of Gaetano Rossi's Teodoro for the work's world premiere. She was also heard that year in Florence. She had a major triumph at La Fenice in 1813 when she performed the title role in the world premiere of Gioachino Rossini's Tancredi. She later performed that role in Ferrara (1814), Bologna (1814), Livorno (1816), and Naples (1818). The latter performance was attended by composer Ferdinand Hérold who "did not like the timbre of her voice but thought her style, taste and intonation perfect".

Malanotte sang in two more world premieres at La Fenice during her career: Pavesi's Le Danaidi romane (1816, Cajo Valerio) and Francesco Basili's L'ira d'Achille (1817, Achille). She retired from the stage in 1821. She died in Salò in 1832 at the age of 47.
