= Tancredi =

Opera by Gioachino Rossini

- Opera seria by Gioachino Rossini
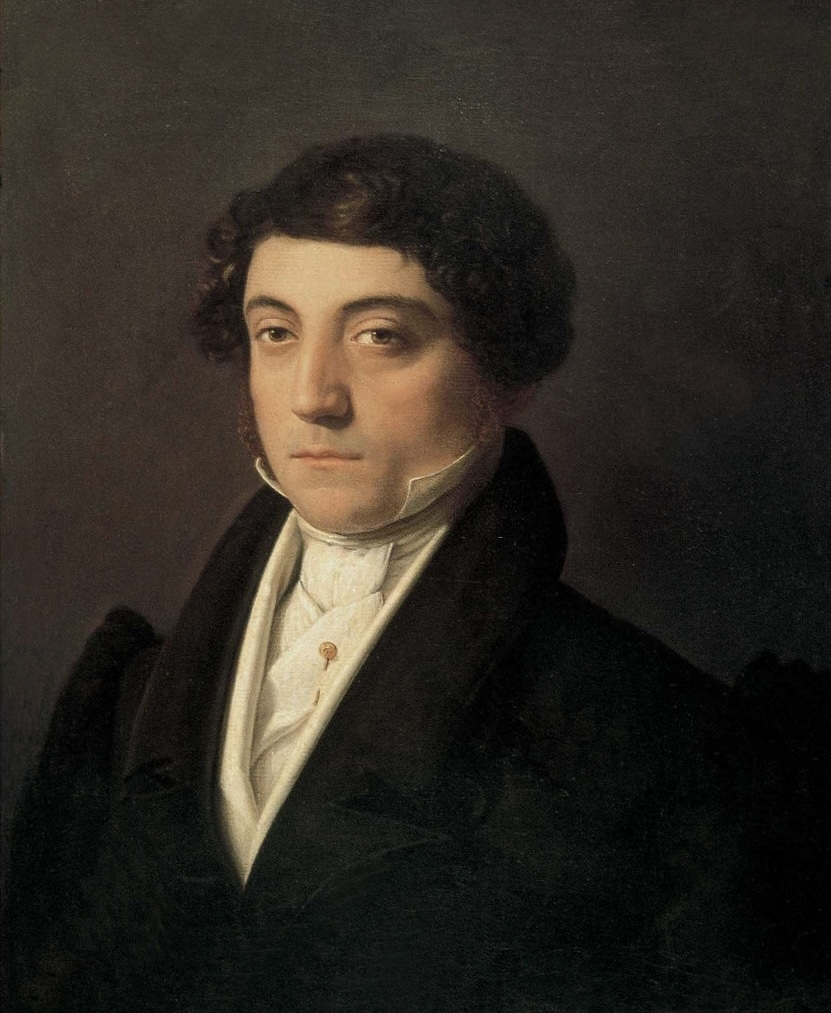
- Portrait of the composer
- Librettist: Gaetano Rossi
- Language: Italian
- Based on: Tancrède by Voltaire
- Premiere: 6 February 1813; Teatro La Fenice, Venice

Tancredi is a melodramma eroico (opera seria or heroic opera) in two acts by composer Gioachino Rossini and librettist Gaetano Rossi (who was also to write Semiramide ten years later), based on Voltaire's play Tancrède (1760). The opera made its first appearance at the Teatro La Fenice in Venice on 6 February 1813, less than a month after the premiere of his previous opera Il signor Bruschino. The overture, borrowed from La pietra del paragone, is a popular example of Rossini's characteristic style and is regularly performed in concert and recorded.

Considered by Stendhal, Rossini's earliest biographer, to be "high amongst the composer's masterworks", and describing it as "a genuine thunderbolt out of a clear, blue sky for the Italian lyric theatre," his librettist Gaetano Rossi notes that, with it, "Rossini rose to glory". Richard Osborne proclaims it to be "his fully fledged opera seria and it established him, more or less instantly, as Italy's leading composer of contemporary opera."

Although the original version had a happy ending (as required by the opera seria tradition), soon after the Venice premiere, Rossini—who was more of a Neo-classicist than a Romantic, notes Servadio—had the poet Luigi Lechi rework the libretto to emulate the original tragic ending by Voltaire. In this new ending, presented at the Teatro Comunale in Ferrara on 21 March 1813, Tancredi wins the battle but is mortally wounded, and only then does he learn that Amenaide never betrayed him. Argirio marries the lovers in time for Tancredi to die in his wife's arms.

As has been stated by Philip Gossett and Patricia Brauner, it was the rediscovery of the score of this ending in 1974 (although elsewhere Gossett provides evidence that it was 1976) that resulted in the version which is usually performed today.

== Composition history ==
By the time he was twenty years old, Rossini's reputation had grown such that he was regarded as "'a maestro di cartello', a composer whose name alone guarantees a public". Success with La pietra del paragone for Milan in September was great, but delays caused him to be late in Venice for his next commission at the Teatro San Moisè, L'occasione fa il ladro. Other comedies had preceded L'occasione, but its success ensured a fifth opera for that house. This was Il Signor Bruschino, which was presented on 27 January 1813 and which the composer wrote more-or-less parallel to preparing Tancredi, a commission for this opera having been accepted from Venice's most prestigious house, La Fenice, the previous autumn.

Other treatments of the Tancredi story had been prepared, the most recent being that of Stefano Pavesi in 1812. However, many of Rossini's formal inventions, seen in his earlier one-act operas, are here incorporated with great effect and formalism. As Gossett notes: "The opera established a new formal synthesis, new compositional models, with, through, and in spite of which Italian composers were to operate."

The revised ending for Ferrara, March, 1813

This revised version of the opera, presented a month after its Venice premiere, incorporates Voltaire's original ending. The music for this ending was withdrawn, it disappeared, and was not discovered until 1976.

Act 1: The duet L'aura che interno spiri / "The air you breathe brings mortal danger" from act 1 (the first encounter between the couple) was removed and replaced with Lasciami: non t'ascolto from act 2, something which Richard Osborne regards "as introducing a not entirely plausible note of confrontation into the lovers' first encounter".

Act 2 finale: Having come to find Tancredi, the knights of Syracuse enter along with Argirio and Amenaide. Angrily, Tancredi orders Amenaide to go to Solamir's camp, upset that she has come to disturb him. He leaves to go into battle, and shortly Argirio returns to report that the Syracusans have been victorious but that Tancredi has been severely wounded. He is carried in and learns from Argirio the truth about Amenaide just in time for Argirio to marry them. He then dies in her arms.

According to Richard Osborne, the 1813 re-workings for Ferrara were not a success and "Rossini withdrew the revision and, as was his habit, redistributed some of the music in later work". In Divas and Scholars, musicologist Philip Gossett recounts how this ending was rediscovered:

Until the mid-1970s, no musical score was known to exist..[..]..The late Count Giacomo Lechi of Brecia ...[whose predecessor was the writer Luigi Lechi who had prepared the text for Ferrara]...was reviewing the family's papers in 1976, came across several musical manuscripts [one of which] bore the ..[..]..attestation [by Rossini]: "I declare (and not without shame) that this is an autograph of mine from 1813!!" (It was dated 22 November 1867).

Following the discovery, the preparation of the critical edition for the Fondazione Rossini by Philip Gossett and others at the University of Chicago began in 1976.

December 1813 revision for Milan

In addition to restoring the happy ending, by the end of 1813 and in time for the Milan premiere in December at the new Teatro Ré, Rossini had also restored the cut second duet and had re-written and restored Argirio's cut aria. Other changes included Roggiero becoming a tenor with a new aria Torni d'amor la face, two different arias being composed for Argirio, and both duets for Tancredi and Amenaide being restored to their original locations.

While Tancredi and Amenaide are happily reunited, he is given "an entirely new rondo in lieu of the more elaborate gran scena of the original score after Tancredi learns from Argirio that her letter was written for him, and not for Solamir (rather than there being a denial from Solamir).

== Performance history ==
19th century

Tancredi premiered in February 1813 at La Fenice in Venice with Adelaide Malanotte in the title role. The first two performances suffered because of vocal problems from its two female principals, but its success was assured over six performances into the following month.

It was quickly re-mounted in a revised version in Ferrara in March of that year which reverted to Voltaire's tragic ending, but audiences disliked it and subsequent performances there reverted to the Venice ending, with a further revision appearing in Milan in December. Gossett established in 1971 that, later, Rossini also participated in other revisions for performances elsewhere in Italy, including those at the Teatro Comunale di Bologna in 1814 and the Naples premiere given at the Teatro del Fondo in 1816 and again in 1818.

However, Heather Hadlock notes that it was the Milanese version of December 1813 which became "something like a definitive form, and in this form it took Italy by storm". Other Italian houses presented the Venice version, including the Teatro Apollo in Rome (1814), the Teatro Regio di Torino (1814 and 1829), La Fenice again (1815, 1823 and 1833), and the Teatro San Moisè in Venice in March 1816 when, in another revision, it is the dying Solamir who professes Amenaide's innocence, and Tancredi returns home in triumph.

Philip Gossett's research in 1971 states that "until about 1825 the musical text was rather fluid. The first Ricordi edition (1829), which differs significantly from the later ones, corresponds to the Milanese version", but many other Italian cities saw the opera, including Florence (in 1814, 1816, and 1825), Padua (1814), Livorno (1815), Vicenza (1816), Macerata (1817), Camerino (1828), Viterbo (1828), Milan (1829), and Trieste (1830). Depending upon where it was performed, the opera was subject to textual alterations around explicit religious content, including Amenaide's prison prayer "Giusto Dio, che umile adoro", which was altered or suppressed in some productions.

Outside of Italy, it was given in Corfù (1822), Lisbon (as Tacredo) (1826), and Geneva and Buenos Aires (1828). The opera was first performed in England at the King's Theatre in London on 4 May 1820 with Fanny Corri-Paltoni as Amenaide. Its French premiere was given by the Théâtre-Lyrique Italien at the Salle Louvois in Paris on 23 April 1822 with Giuditta Pasta in the title role. It was seen in Portugal for the first time at the Teatro Nacional de São Carlos on 18 September 1822 (as Tancredo) and was given its La Scala premiere on 8 November 1823 with Brigida Lorenzani as Tancredi.

The United States premiere occurred on 31 December 1825 at the Park Theatre in New York City using the revised Ferrara version by Lechi. The Paris Opéra mounted the work for the first time with Maria Malibran in the title role on 30 March 1829. After an 1833 revival at the Teatro Comunale di Bologna, Tancredi was not mounted again until almost 120 years later.

20th century and beyond

The Maggio Musicale Fiorentino revived the work on 17 May 1952 with Giulietta Simionato in the title role, Teresa Stich-Randall as Amenaide, Francesco Albanese as Argirio, Mario Petri as Orbazzano, and Tullio Serafin conducting. The opera was given at the Collegiate Theatre as part of the Camden Festival in April 1971 by the Basilica Opera.

With the discovery of the long-lost music for the March 1813 Ferrara revision and the resulting preparation and completion of the critical edition, the work was revived when mezzo-soprano Marilyn Horne, who had expressed interest as early as 1972 in performing the Ferrara edition if it ever came to light took on the title role at the Houston Grand Opera on 13 October 1977. Horne, who quickly became strongly associated with that role, insisted on the tragic Ferrara ending, citing that it is more consistent with the overall tone of the opera and that she "did not find the happy ending convincing". Indeed, most of the recordings of this opera today use the Ferrara conclusion, while some include the Venice finale as an extra track.

Horne's triumphant performances as Tancredi in Houston soon led to invitations from other opera houses to sing the role, and it is largely through her efforts that the opera enjoyed a surge of revivals during the latter half of the 20th century. She sang the part for performances at the Teatro dell'Opera di Roma (1977), the San Francisco Opera (1979), the Aix-en-Provence Festival (1981), La Fenice (1981, 1983), and the Lyric Opera of Chicago (1989) among others.

Contralto Ewa Podleś achieved recognition in the title role, performing it at the Vlaamse Opera (1991), La Scala (1993), the Berlin State Opera (1996), Polish National Opera at Warsaw (2000), the Canadian Opera Company (2005), the Caramoor International Music Festival (2006), the Teatro Real (2007), and Opera Boston (2009) among others. She also recorded the role in 1995. Bulgarian mezzo-soprano Vesselina Kasarova has also been praised in the role, singing it at the Salzburg Festival (1992), with the Opera Orchestra of New York (1997), and on a 1996 recording with the Bavarian Radio Chorus and Munich Radio Orchestra.

Pier Luigi Pizzi staged a new production of Tancredi for the Rossini Opera Festival in Pesaro in 1982 which originally utilised both the tragic and happy endings – the former being interpolated as a "dream sequence" for Amenaide. He also designed both costumes and scenery. The production was conducted by Gianluigi Gelmetti and featured Lucia Valentini Terrani in the title role, as well as Dalmacio Gonzales as Argirio, Katia Ricciarelli as Amenaide, Giancarlo Luccardi as Orbazzano and, as Isaura, Bernadette Manca di Nissa – who later went on to perform the title role for the 1992 live DVD recording. The production was also revived at Pesaro in 1991, 1999, and 2004.

Tancredi was staged at 2003 at Polish National Opera at Warsaw, in the performance directed by Tomasz Konina and conducted by Alberto Zedda, the title role was sung by Ewa Podleś, with original tragic ending. The second production in Poland took place in Warsaw Chamber Opera in 2008.

In 2005 the production went to Rome and Florence (where it was filmed for DVD with Daniela Barcellona in the title role), and then it was presented by the Deutsche Oper Berlin in 2011, with Alberto Zedda conducting. Barcellona sang Tancredi again in a new staging of the opera at the Teatro Regio di Torino in November 2009 after reprising the part in February 2009 at the Teatro de la Maestranza. The Theater an der Wien mounted the work for the first time in October 2009 with Vivica Genaux in the title role and René Jacobs conducting.

Tancredi was presented in concert by the Théâtre des Champs-Élysées in Paris in December 2009 with Nora Gubisch as Tancredi. In addition, as part of its Rossini revivals series, it presented a fully staged production in May 2014 with Marie-Nicole Lemieux in the title role and Patrizia Ciofi as Amenaide. The production used the "unhappy" Ferrara ending, but incorporated many of the changes and reversions found in the December 1813 version for Milan.

In 2018 Teatro Nuovo presented alternating performances of the original Venetian score (including the portions that have been replaced in most modern productions) and a version they called Tancredi rifatto, incorporating every known substitute piece by Rossini (including the aria written to replace "Di tanti palpiti").

== Roles ==
Role	Voice type	Premiere cast, 6 February 1813 (Conductor: -)
Tancredi, an exiled Syracusan soldier	contralto or mezzo-soprano	Adelaide Mаlanotte-Montresor
Amenaide, the daughter of a noble family, in love with Tancredi	soprano	Elisabetta Manfredini-Guarmani
Argirio, father of Amenaide; head of his family, at war with the family of Orbazzano	tenor	Pietro Todràn
Orbazzano, the head of his noble family, at war with the family of Argirio	bass	Luciano Bianchi
Isaura, friend to Amenaide	contralto	Teresa Marchesi
Roggiero, Tancredi's squire	mezzo-soprano or tenor	Carolina Sivelli
Knights, nobles, squires, Syracusans, Saracens; ladies-in-waiting, warriors, pages, guards, etc

== Synopsis ==
Background

Syracuse has recently experienced competition and war with the Byzantine Empire (with which it has an unstable truce) and the Saracen armies headed by Solamir, but exhausted, has internal conflicts, too. The soldier, Tancredi, and his family have been stripped of their lands and wealth, and he himself has been banished since his youth. Two noble families, headed by Argirio and Orbazzano, have been warring for years but begin to reconcile. Also present is Solamir, the Moorish general. Argirio's daughter, Amenaide, is secretly in love with Tancredi. Prior to the beginning of the opera, she has sent him a letter (without naming him in it), and it is this letter which complicates proceedings.

Place: The city-state of Syracuse
Time: AD 1005

[This synopsis reflects the action which occurs in the original Venice version of February 1813]

=== Act 1 ===
Overture

Scene 1: A gallery in Argirio's palace

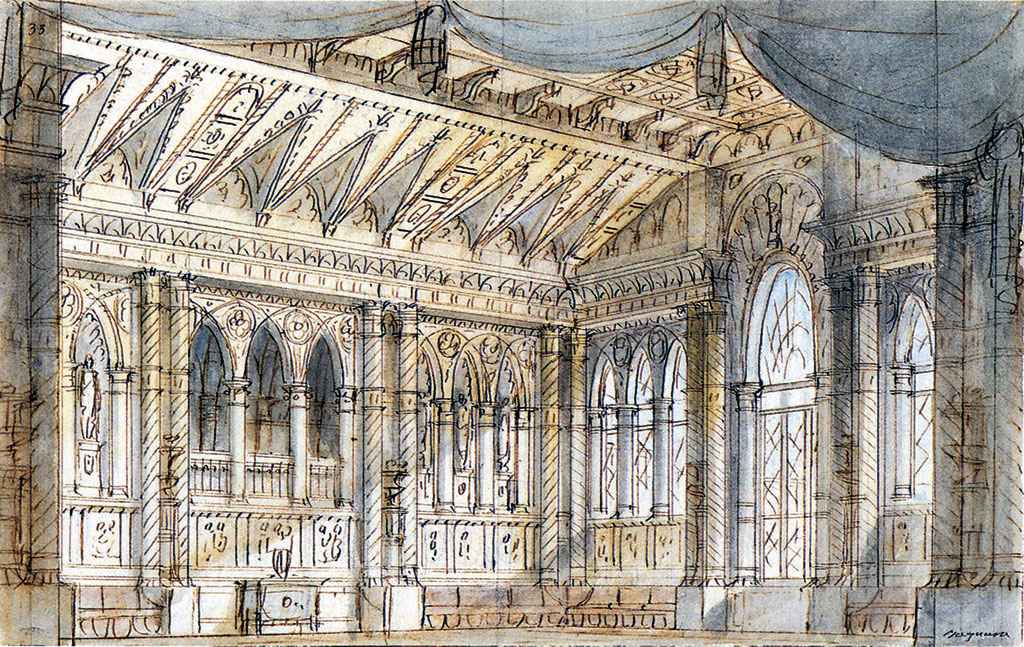
Francesco Bagnara's set for Act 1 scene 1, Venice 1833

Warring nobles Argirio, leader of the Senate in Syracuse, and Orbazzano and their men celebrate a truce and the end of a civil war: Chorus: Pace, onore, fede, amore / "Peace, honour, faith, love / Rule now". Along with Isaura, Amenaide's friend, and her ladies, Argirio proclaims that this unity reinforces a new security for the city against the Moorish forces led by Solamir: Se amistà verace, è pura / "If you keep in your heart true friendship". He names Orbazzano as the leader against the Moors. However, Argirio warns the assembled forces against a possible greater threat, that from the banished Tancredi, a statement which disturbs Isaura. Argirio then summons his daughter, Amenaide, to appear.

She joins in the general songs of triumph by the assembly, but is disturbed because her secret beloved, Tancredi, has not rejoined her although she has written to him asking him to do so as she knows that he is returning in disguise. The Senate has given Tancredi and his family's confiscated estates to Orbazzano and Argirio offers him Amenaide's hand in marriage to help solidify the truce. He wishes the ceremony to be performed immediately, and although Amenaide dutifully consents to the marriage, she pleads with her father to postpone it until the following day. All leave except Isaura who laments upon the situation in which Amenaide is now placed: Amenaide sventurata! / "Unhappy Amenaide, what a dreadful day for you".

Scene 2: A garden in the Palace

In the early morning, near a garden close to the seashore, Roggiero, Tancredi's squire, then Tancredi and his men, disembark. Not having received Amenaide's letter, he pledges to help defend the city against the invaders and to seek out his beloved: Aria: Oh patria! dolce, e ingrata patria / O my country, dear, thankless native land". Roggiero is dispatched with a message for Amenaide, and he sends his followers to spread the word that an unknown knight has arrived to help save the city. His thoughts turn to Amenaide: Tu che accendi questo core / "You who set aflame this heart", and then to how much pain he has caused her: Di tanti palpiti, di tante pene / "After such beating of the heart, such torment".

When all have left, Tancredi sees Argirio and his daughter enter the garden. He hides, but can overhear them. Argirio informs the accompanying followers that they are invited to the wedding which will take place that noon. The young woman pleads for more time, but is told that the ceremony must take place right away. Argirio continues by informing all that the enemy leader, Solamir, has surrounded the city, and has asked for Amenaide's hand in marriage. He also tells Amenaide that Tancredi has returned to Messina, and that the Senate has condemned him to death as a traitor. He forcibly reminds Amenaide that she owes to be obedient to her father's wishes and marry Orbazzano without delay. Argirio's aria: Pensa che sei mia figlia / "Think that you are my daughter".

As Argirio leaves, Amenaide immediately regrets that she has indirectly involved Tancredi by writing to him: Che feci! incauta! / "What have I done! Thoughtless woman!". Tancredi then appears and Amenaide tells him that he must immediately escape. Coldly, she rejects his claims of loving her, although the couple, in spite of their differences, then laments the dangerous situation in which they find themselves: Duet: L'aura che interno spiri / "The air you breathe brings mortal danger".

[This duet, being the first confrontation between the couple, was omitted after the Venice premiere and replaced with Lasciami: non t'ascolto from act 2, scene 3. However, it reappears in some modern recordings (and productions) which use the Ferrara ending and some of which therefore omit Lasciami. Others retain it.]

Scene 3: A public square close to the cathedral

People are gathered in the square for the wedding ceremony. Argirio assures all that the new-found unity between the two factions will be strengthened by the marriage. In disguise, Tancredi appears and offers his services. Privately, he feels that Amenaide has betrayed him by accepting the marriage but, when she refuses to go ahead with it, an angry Orbazzano enters. Publicly, he denounces her and, having overheard the prior conversation, declares that the marriage will not take place. Immediately, he produces a letter, which he assumes was intended for Solamir and which appears to implicate her in a treasonous plot to overthrow Syracuse by calling upon the recipient to come and capture the city. [In reality, it is the letter which Amenaide had sent to Tancredi, deliberately omitting his name for his protection, and which had never reached him].

The assembled crowd is horrified: "Die in disgrace, woman!" they proclaim. Amenaide swears that she is innocent, but her father denounces her, as does Tancredi. She is dragged off to prison to await death as all except her faithful Isaura proclaim: Quale infausto orrendo giorno! / "A day of disaster, what an ill-starred day...a day of disasters and terrors."

=== Act 2 ===
Scene 1: A gallery in Argirio's castle

An angry Orbazzano reflects on Amenaide's apparent treachery and her contempt of him: Vedesti? L'indegna! / "You have seen? She spurns me, the unworthy woman". Aside, Isaura pities Amenaide's fate, reminding Argirio that Amenaide is his daughter: È tua figlia! / "She is your own daughter". The assembled knights are divided in their emotions, with some of the group of knights pleading for mercy, others supporting his decision, but while Argirio expresses his sorrow at the turn of events, (Aria: Oh Dio! Crudel! qual nome caro e fatal or mi rammenti / "You remind me of that name both dear and fatal"), he reluctantly signs the death warrant.

[Ferrara version as performed: Arigio's aria is removed.]

All but Isaura and Orbazzano leave. She reproaches him for his cruel and barbarous behaviour, and, alone after he leaves, pleads for divine aid for Amenaide: Aria: Tu che i miseri conforti / "You who console the miserable, give her endurance".

Scene 2: Inside the prison

In chains, Amenaide enters: Aria: Di mia vita infelice / "Here I am at the end of my unhappy life". She cries out to Tancredi "I die for you!": Aria: No, che il morir non è / "No, death is not so terrible to me if I die for love". In the end, she believes that he will learn the truth and "he will know the constancy of my heart".

Into the prison come Orbazzano and his followers, determined to see the execution carried out. He asks if there is anyone willing to defend the traitor. Tancredi, although he still believes that his love has been betrayed and that Amenaide is a traitor, steps forward. He challenges Orbazzano to a duel in defense of Amenaide's honor and life, and throws down his gauntlet. Throughout the interchange, Amenaide urges Tancredi to prove that she is innocent. Orbazzano embraces the unknown knight, seeking to know his identity as does Argirio who, in a duet with Tancredi, pleads: Ah! se de'mali miei / "Ah! If you have pity in your heart for my sufferings, At least reveal to me who you are. Comfort me in my pain". In return, Tancredi declares "Heaven has been my enemy since my childhood. You will know who I am one day, But do not hate me..." before the trumpet sounds, signaling the start of the contest. Before heading for the duelling site, he proclaims "To the field; I burn with glory and with fury".

Elsewhere in the prison, Amenaide learns what has transpired and prays for protection for Tancredi, begging him to return to her a victor: Aria: Gran Dio! Deh! tu proteggi / "Just God whom I humbly adore, You can read in my heart, You know whether I am guilty, And for whom I ask your favour". From outside, a roar announces Tancredi's victory, while she declares: "In this moment I see it, I feel it."

Scene 3: The main square of the town

Tancredi arrives triumphant and the people rejoice. However, as sweet as victory may be, he resolves to leave Sicily and, as Amenaide approaches him, he still believes that she has been unfaithful and is unwilling to talk to her. In a duet, they express their conflicting emotions: Duet: Lasciami: non t'ascolto / "Let me go; I will not listen to you". She then demands that he kill her, but both leave while Roggiero remains, having learned the truth from Isaura: S'avverassero pure I detti suoi! / "If only her words were true". Roggiero expresses the hope that, if Amenaide is indeed innocent, then "May the torch of love return shining, smiling and fair".

Scene 4: A cavern in a mountain range with Mt. Etna in the distance

Alone and close to the Saracens' camp, Tancredi reflects upon his sad destiny: Aria: Dove sono io? / "Where am I? Through what horrors does my despair lead me?", all the while recalling Amenaide's betrayal: "Oh that I could forget!" The Saracens appear, proclaiming Regna il terror nella Città / "Terror reigns in the city". With the arrival of the knights of Syracuse along with Argirio and Amenaide, who come in search of Solamir, Amenaide is told that peace will follow if she agrees to marry him. Tancredi defies the Saracens, expressing a willingness to fight to the death: Rondo: Perchè turbar la calma / "Why trouble the peace of my heart". Tancredi goes into battle and, when all is over, emerges victorious and learns that the dying Solamir has testified to Amenaide's innocence.

In a moment of general rejoicing, the lovers are reunited: Fra quai soave palpiti / "Gently beats my heart". Tancredi, Agirio and Amenaide are united in expressing their joy: Si grande è il mio contento / "So great is my joy", and Isaura joins them in the general rejoicing.

[Ferrara ending as written: one month after the original production, Rossini revised the ending (along with other changes) so that Tancredi wins the battle but is mortally wounded, and only then does he learn that Amenaide never betrayed him. As all clasp hands, Argirio marries the lovers in time for Tancredi to die in his wife's arms.]

== Music ==
In regard to Rossini's innovations which appear in this, his first opera seria, the Grove Dictionary notes that they "were derived from his early one-act operas" and writer Gaia Servadio notes that [the opera] marks an important stage in the development of opera through the innovations that Rossini brought. With self-assurance and guts, he introduced changes now often taken for granted: the recitatives are short and linked to the context of the arias; there is a new and masterful balance between the dramatic, the lyrical, and the musical; and the chorus makes its first appearance in an opera seria.

But it is in the innovations which move away from accepted formulas and which are seen in the finale of the opera in its Ferrara edition that Philip Gossett finds the most striking in Tancredi: "the 'Cavatina Finale' as Rossini called the concluding moments of the opera, depart so completely from typical finale designs of the period that we can easily comprehend their failure to gain popular approval. Gone are the coloratura flourishes; gone is a more elaborate orchestration; gone are requirements of phrase construction and cadential repetition; gone, in short, are the conventions that usually rule Italian opera. Instead, the concluding moments of the opera mirror each word of the dying hero, supported essentially by strings alone."

Additionally, we find in Gossett and Brauner an explanation of another aspect of Rossini's compositional style: in his vocal writing, although the opera continues to use "closed numbers separated by secco recitatives, a flexibility of style makes possible extensive dramatic activity within numbers." They continue stating that it is in the duets that a sectional form is employed so that "the opening section allows dramatic confrontation between the characters, who express their often differing emotions in parallel stanzas." There follows a lyrical section – "with further dramatic interaction" – and then the cabaletta which allows for greater confrontation or accord, thus reflecting any changes in the dramatic configuration.

== Recordings ==
Year	Cast (Tancredi, Amenaide, Argirio, Orbazzano)	Conductor, opera house and orchestra	Label
1977	Marilyn Horne, Margherita Rinaldi, Renzo Casellato, Nicola Zaccaria	Gabriele Ferro, Orchestra and Chorus of Teatro dell'Opera di Roma, (Audio and video recordings of a performance(s) in the Rome Opera, December)	Audio CD: Celestial Audio, Cat: CA 202
1978	Fiorenza Cossotto, Lella Cuberli, Werner Hollweg, Nicola Ghiuselev	Gabriele Ferro, Capella Coloniesis and Chorus of Westdeutschen Rundfunks	CD: Fonit Cetra; Cat: 2564 69972-7
1981	Marilyn Horne, Lella Cuberli, Ernesto Palacio, Nicola Zaccaria	Ferrara version Ralf Weikert, Orchestra and Chorus of La Fenice, Venice (Recording of a performance in La Fenice, December)	CD: Mondo Musica; Cat: MFOH 1074
1992	Bernadette Manca di Nissa, María Bayo, Raúl Giménez, Ildebrando D'Arcangelo	Ferrara version Gianluigi Gelmetti; Radio Symphony Orchestra and Chorus, Stuttgart (Recording of a performance at the Schlosstheater Schwetzingen) (Includes Venice ending)	DVD: Arthaus Musik; Cat: 100 206 (Europe); 100 207 (US)
1994	Ewa Podleś, Sumi Jo, Stanford Olsen, Pietro Spagnoli	Venice version Alberto Zedda, Collegium Instrumentale Brugense, Capella Brugensis (recorded at the Poissy Theatre and the Centre Musical-Lyrique-Phonographique, Île de France, from 26 to 31 January)	CD: Naxos Records; Cat: 8.660037-8
1995	Vesselina Kasarova, Eva Mei, Ramón Vargas, Harry Peeters	Venice version Roberto Abbado, Münchener Sinfonieorchester, Bayrischer Rundfunkchor (Includes the Ferrara ending)	CD: RCA Victor; Cat: 09026 68349-2
2003	Daniela Barcellona, Mariola Cantarero, Charles Workman (tenor), Nicola Ulivieri	Paolo Arrivabeni, Orchestra and Chorus of the Teatro Lirico Giuseppe Verdi, Trieste	DVD: Kicco Classics; Cat: KCOU 9004
2004	Matthias Rexroth, Alexandra Zabala, Simon Edwards, Christian Tschelebiew,	Wilhelm Keitel, Minsk Orchestra and the "Motet et Madrigal" Chamber Choir, Posen	CD: NEF; Cat: ASIN: B0002CPFCE
2005	Daniela Barcellona, Darina Takova, Raúl Giménez, Marco Spotti	Ferrara version Riccardo Frizza, Orchestra and Chorus of Maggio Musicale Fiorentino (Video recording of a performance in the Teatro Comunale di Firenze, 21 October)	DVD: TDK, Cat: DVWW OPTANC
