= Stanford Olsen =

American tenor (born 1960)

Stanford Olsen (born 1960) is an American tenor who has had an active international career in operas and concerts since 1983. He has sung with several of the world's leading opera companies, including the Deutsche Oper Berlin, La Scala and the Royal Opera, London. He was a regular performer at the Metropolitan Opera from 1986 until 1997 where he gave more than 160 performances. A specialist in light lyric tenor roles, he excelled in the operas of Mozart, Bellini, Donizetti, and Gioachino Rossini. After retiring from full-time performance in the late 1990s he became a faculty member at the Florida State University's College of Music, where he was Professor of Voice and Lucille P. and Elbert B. Shelfer Eminent Scholar. He joined the faculty at the University of Michigan School of Music, Theatre & Dance in 2012. In 2015 he was appointed Director of the Castleton Festival's Artist Training Seminar. He continues to perform on the concert platform in addition to his teaching and coaching.

== Life and career ==
Olsen was born and raised in Utah. His family are members of the Church of Jesus Christ of Latter-day Saints and he grew up in that faith. Prior to college he served a two-year LDS Mission in Vienna, Austria. He earned a Bachelor of Music degree from the University of Utah in 1984 where he was a voice student of Naomi Farr. While a student at the U. of U. he married Jennifer Jensen, a piano major at the university, in 1983. He then pursued further voice studies at the University of Cincinnati College-Conservatory of Music. In 1986 he won the Metropolitan Opera National Council Auditions which led to his admittance into the Lindemann Young Artists Development Program at the Metropolitan Opera. In 1989 he won the prestigious Naumburg Award.

Olsen made his professional singing debut in 1983, performing in concerts with the Utah Symphony Orchestra. He made his professional opera debut at the Met on December 18, 1986, as Arturo in Vincenzo Bellini's I puritani with Joan Sutherland as Elvira as a replacement in the final act for an ailing Rockwell Blake. He spent the next three seasons at the Met appearing in supporting roles like Borsa in Rigoletto, Gastone in La traviata, Arturo in Lucia di Lammermoor, and the Song Seller in Il tabarro. He did, however, sing the lead role of Nemorino in Donizetti's L'elisir d'amore to the Adina of Ruth Ann Swenson in the Met's touring production in July 1988. His first leading role on the mainstage of the Met was as Count Almaviva in Rossini's The Barber of Seville in October 1989. He sang several more large roles at the Met over the next eight years, including Alfred in Die Fledermaus, Fenton in Falstaff, Idreno in Semiramide, the Italian Tenor in Der Rosenkavalier, and Tonio in La fille du régiment, Argirio in Tancrediin 1994 at the Poissy Theater France,. His final appearance at the Met was as Don Ottavio in Don Giovanni in 1997.

In 1987 Olsen performed Count Almaviva in The Barber of Seville with the Wolf Trap Opera Company. Engagements with important opera companies, both in the United States and abroad, soon followed; including the Miami Opera (debut 1988 as Don Ottavio in Don Giovanni), the Salzburg Festival, the Royal Opera, London, and the Teatro Nacional de São Carlos. In 2004 he performed the roles of the Governor/Vanderdendur/Ragotski in a concert version of Leonard Bernstein's Candide with Kristin Chenoweth, Patti LuPone, and the New York Philharmonic; a performance which was nationally broadcast on PBS' Great Performances.

== Roles performed at the Metropolitan Opera ==
Opera	Role	Performances	First performance	Last performance
I puritani	Arturo	6	1986	1997
Rigoletto	Borsa	15	1986	1989
La traviata	Gastone	9	1987	1988
L'elisir d'amore	Nemorino	14	1988	1996
Lucia di Lammermoor	Arturo	17	1988	1989
Il tabarro	Song Seller	4	1989	1989
The Barber of Seville	Count Almaviva	20	1989	1995
Die Entführung aus dem Serail	Belmonte	5	1990	1991
Der Rosenkavalier	Italian Tenor	20	1990	1995
Don Giovanni	Don Ottavio	28	1990	1997
Semiramide	Idreno	7	1990	1993
Falstaff	Fenton	6	1992	1996
La fille du régiment	Tonio	3	1994	1994
Die Fledermaus	Alfred	5	1995	1995
