= Lella Cuberli =

American opera singer

Lella Cuberli (September 29, 1945) is an American soprano, particularly associated with the Belcanto repertory.

Born Lela Alice Terrell in Austin, Texas, she studied in Dallas and later in Milan. She made her professional debut in Siena, in 1973, and for some years pursued her career mainly in Italy, making her mark in Rossini, Donizetti and Bellini operas.

She sang at Martina Franca from 1976 to 1982, as Amenaide, Adalgisa, and in Paisiello operas. She appeared at La Scala from 1978 to 1985, as Aminta, Ginevra, Rodelinda, Giunia, Contessa di Folleville . Other roles at the major opera houses of Italy have included; Donna Anna, Fiordiligi, Rossini's Elisabetta and Desdemona, etc. She also appeared at the Paris Opéra, the Aix-en-Provence Festival, the Vienna State Opera and the Salzburg Festival.

Returning to the United States, she made her debut at the Lyric Opera of Chicago in 1989, as Amenaide, and at the Metropolitan Opera in 1990, as Semiramide. In 1990, she also made her debut at Covent Garden in London, as Mathilde.

She can be heard on disc in works by Mozart, notably in Daniel Barenboim's recording cycle of the Lorenzo Da Ponte's operas, Le nozze di Figaro, Don Giovanni, Cosi fan tutte. She also recorded Giunia in Mozart's Lucio Silla and the Great Mass in C minor under James Levine, the soprano part in Herbert von Karajan's recording of the Beethoven's Missa Solemnis and the 9th Symphony, Rossini's Il viaggio a Reims and Tancredi, and Donizetti's Pia de' Tolomei. She has also recorded two solo recitals of works by Donizetti, Bellini, Rossini, Pergolesi and Mozart.

Cuberli's voice is not large, but rich and beautiful, and is firmly produced, flexible and used with style. She taught at the University of North Texas during the Spring Semester of 2008.

== Sources ==
- Grove Music Online, Elizabeth Forbes, Oxford University Press, March 2008.
