= Daniela Barcellona =

Italian operatic mezzo-soprano

Daniela Barcellona (born 28 March 1969) is an Italian operatic mezzo-soprano.

== Biography ==
Barcellona was born in Trieste, where she completed her musical studies under the guidance of Alessandro Vitiello, pianist and conductor. She married Vitiello in 1998 and continued to work with him on a professional level.

Barcellona won the “Adriano Belli” award in Spoleto, the “Iris Adami Corradetti” award in Padua, and the “Pavarotti International Voice Competition” in Philadelphia. She debuted in the title role of Tancredi at the Rossini Opera Festival in Pesaro in 1999, establishing herself as a reference interpreter for “en travesti” roles.

In the early 2000s, Barcellona performed at New York's Metropolitan Opera, La Scala in Milan, the Royal Opera House in London, the Théâtre des Champs-Élysées in Paris, the Bayerische Staatsoper in Munich, the Teatro Real in Madrid, the Salzburg Festival and the Gran Teatre del Liceu in Barcelona.

She and Joyce DiDonato won a Laurence Olivier Award in 2018 for their performances of Rossini's Semiramide at the Royal Opera House. In 2010, she sang the role of Dido in Berlioz's Les Troyens, conducted by Valery Gergiev.
