= Alberto Zedda =

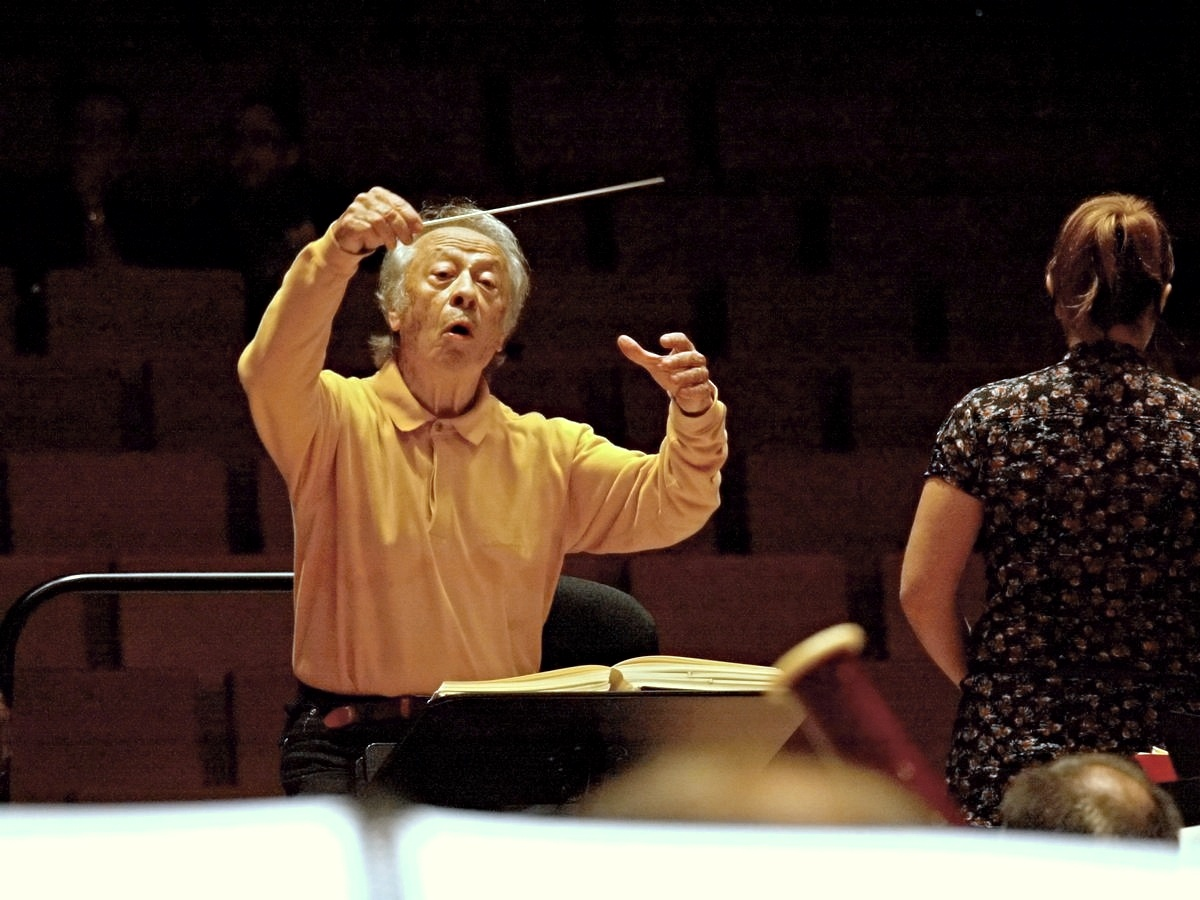
- Alberto Zedda in 2010

Background information
- Born: 2 January 1928; Milan, Italy
- Died: 6 March 2017 (aged 89) Pesaro, Italy
- Genres: 19th-century Italian repertoire
- Occupations: Conductor, musicologist

Alberto Zedda (2 January 1928 – 6 March 2017) was an Italian conductor and musicologist whose specialty was the 19th-century Italian repertoire.

Alberto Zedda (photo with 1960 dedication)

Alberto Zedda was born in Milan, Italy, where he accomplished his education in music and humanities, completed at the Musical Palaeography School of Cremona.

In 1957 he won the International Italian Radio and Television Competition for Conductors and thereafter was invited to appear with important Institutions in Italy (La Scala, Santa Cecilia, Maggio Musicale Fiorentino, the TV-Radio Orchestras of Rome, Turin, Milan, Naples…) and abroad in Germany, Holland, Belgium, France, Spain, Poland, Russia, Israel, United States, China, Japan, and other sites.

Besides the symphonic activity, Alberto Zedda has developed an outstanding career in opera: La Scala, San Carlo, La Fenice, Massimo di Palermo, Comunale di Bologna, Regio di Torino, Covent Garden, Marinski, Vienna, San Francisco, Los Angeles, Paris, Helsinki, Tel Aviv, Warsaw, Lisboa, Barcelona, Madrid, Sevilla, Oviedo, Bilbao, La Coruña, Moscow, Berlin, Munich, Hamburg, Amsterdam, Prague, Osaka, Tokyo, and other sites.

Recordings made under his direction include operas as well as symphonic and chamber music.

He taught at the Piacenza Conservatory (Orchestral Practice), at the Osimo Academy (Musical Philology) and at the Urbino University (History of the Music). Founder and Director of the Accademia Rossiniana in Pesaro.

He has always dedicated part of his time to musicology, editing widely successful critical versions of operas, oratorios and cantatas, with particular attention to Rossini and to the first half of the 19th Century and early baroque repertoire. Alberto Zedda was member of the Editorial Board of the Fondazione Rossini since it was created.

He wrote Divagazioni Rossiniane, published in 2012 by Ricordi, Milan, which was translated into Spanish, German and English.

He was Principal guest conductor for Italian repertoire at the New York City Opera; Musical Director at the Festival della Valle D’Itria of Martina Franca; Artistic Advisor of the Pesaro’s Rossini Opera Festival and of La Coruña’s Festival Mozart; Artistic Director of Baroque Festival of Fano; Artistic Director of Rossini Opera Festival di Pesaro and of the theatres Carlo Felice in Genova and La Scala in Milan.

Alberto Zedda was Grand Officer of Merit of the Italian Republic, member of the Ordre du “Merite Culturel” of Poland, Académico Correspondiente de la Real Academia Sevillana de Buenas Letras de Sevilla, Honorary Chairmen of the Deutsche Rossini Gesellschaft. He received the degree honoris causa in Communication Sciences by the Macerata University.

== Discography ==
- Rossini – Tancredi – Ewa Podleś, Sumi Jo, Stanford Olsen, Pietro Spagnoli, Anna Maria di Micco, Lucrezia Lendi, Capella Brugensis, Collegium Instrumentale Brugense (Naxos, 1994)
- Bellini – Beatrice di Tenda – Mariana Nicolesco, Stefania Toczyska, Vincenzo La Scola, Piero Cappuccilli, Prague Philharmonic Choir, Monte Carlo Orchestra (Sony, 1986)
- Rossini – L'italiana in Algeri – Marianna Pizzolato, Lorenzo Regazzo, Lawrence Brownlee, Bruno de Simone, Virtuosi Brugensis, Transylvania State Philharmonic Choir, Cluj (Naxos, 2010)
- Rossini – La gazza ladra – Maria José Moreno, Kenneth Tarver, Lorenzo Regazzo, Bruno Praticò, Virtuosi Brugensis, Classic Chamber Choir, Brno (Naxos, 2015)
- Rossini – La Cenerentola – Joyce DiDonato, José Manuel Zapata, Bruno Praticò, Paolo Bordogna, SWR Radio Orchestra Kaiserlautern (Naxos, 2004)
- Rossini – La donna del lago – Sonia Ganassi, Maxim Mironov, Ferdinand von Bothmer, Marianna Pizzolato, Olga Peretyatko, SWR Radio Orchestra Kaiserlautern (Naxos, 2004)

== Sources ==
- Roland Mancini & Jean-Jacques Rouveroux, Le guide de l'opéra, Fayard, 1986.
