= Ildebrando D'Arcangelo =

Italian opera singer (born 1969)

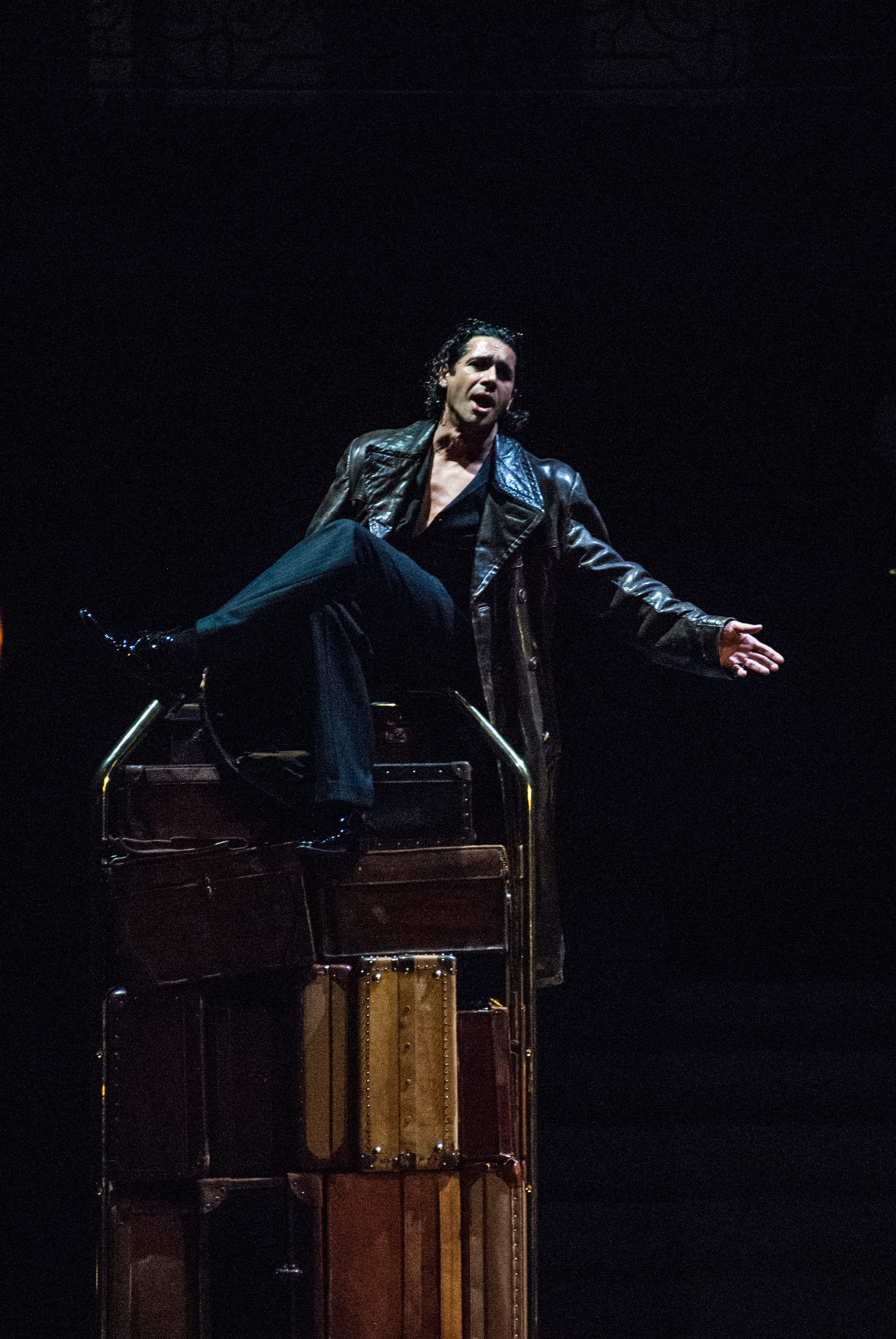
D'Arcangelo as Don Giovanni at the 2014 Salzburg Festival

Ildebrando D'Arcangelo (born 14 December 1969) is an Italian opera singer. He has been called a bass-baritone, though he prefers the term basso cantabile.

== Career ==
A native of Pescara, Abruzzo, D'Arcangelo began his studies in 1985 at the conservatory of Luisa D'Annunzio in Pescara, under Maria Vittoria Romano, honing his skills under Paride Venturi in Bologna.

From 1989 to 1991 he sang at the Concorso Internazionale Toti Dal Monte at Treviso, debuting in Mozart's Così fan tutte and Don Giovanni. He has performed under conductors such as Claudio Abbado, Valery Gergiev, Christopher Hogwood, Georg Solti, Bernard Haitink, Riccardo Muti, James Conlon, John Eliot Gardiner, Riccardo Chailly, Myung-Whun Chung, Nikolaus Harnoncourt and Seiji Ozawa. He has sung at La Scala in Milan, at the Metropolitan Opera in New York, at the Royal Opera House Covent Garden in London, at the Opéra National (Bastille) in Paris, at the Lyric Opera of Chicago, at the Vienna State Opera in Vienna, at the Theater an der Wien, at Los Angeles Opera in California, at Gran Teatre del Liceu in Barcelona, and at the Salzburg Festival.

D'Arcangelo released solo albums of Handel arias in September 2009 and Mozart arias in April 2011 from Deutsche Grammophon.

D'Arcangelo was named an Austrian Kammersänger in December 2014.

== Repertoire ==
| Role | Opera | Composer |
|---|---|---|
| Mefistofele | Mefistofele | Boito |
| Lorenzo | I Capuleti e i Montecchi | Bellini |
| Oroveso | Norma | Bellini |
| Count Rodolfo | La sonnambula | Bellini |
| Giorgio | I puritani | Bellini |
| Méphistophélès | La damnation de Faust | Berlioz |
| Escamillo | Carmen | Bizet |
| Riccardo III | Riccardo III | Canepa |
| Enrico VIII | Anna Bolena | Donizetti |
| Dulcamara | L'elisir d'amore | Donizetti |
| Don Alfonso | Lucrezia Borgia | Donizetti |
| Callistene | Poliuto | Donizetti |
| Méphistophélès | Faust | Gounod |
| Creonte | L'anima del filosofo ossia Orfeo ed Euridice | Haydn |
| Bartolo; Il Conte d'Almaviva; Figaro | Le nozze di Figaro | Mozart |
| Don Giovanni; Leporello; Masetto | Don Giovanni | Mozart |
| Guglielmo; Don Alfonso | Così fan tutte | Mozart |
| Colline | La bohème | Puccini |
| Cesare Angelotti | Tosca | Puccini |
| Orbazzano | Tancredi | Rossini |
| Haly; Mustafà | L'italiana in Algeri | Rossini |
| Selim | Il turco in Italia | Rossini |
| Don Basilio | Il barbiere di Siviglia | Rossini |
| Elmiro | Otello | Rossini |
| Alidoro | La Cenerentola | Rossini |
| Idraote | Armida | Rossini |
| Mosè | Mosè in Egitto | Rossini |
| Capellio | Bianca e Falliero | Rossini |
| Assur; Oroe | Semiramide | Rossini |
| Walter Furst | Guillaume Tell | Rossini |
| Lorenzo | La secchia rapita | Salieri |
| Pirro | I Lombardi alla prima crociata | Verdi |
| Don Ruy Gomez de Silva | Ernani | Verdi |
| Attila | Attila | Verdi |
| Banco | Macbeth | Verdi |
| Monterone | Rigoletto | Verdi |
| Ferrando | Il trovatore | Verdi |
| Jacopo Fiesco | Simon Boccanegra | Verdi |
| Filippo II; Un monaco | Don Carlo | Verdi |
| Lodovico | Otello | Verdi |
| Bajazet | Bajazet | Vivaldi |
| Anzoleto | Il campiello | Wolf-Ferrari |

== Recordings ==
=== Audio ===
- Verdi: Messa da Requiem, released 19 November 2013, C Major, DVD & Blu-ray: 814337011482, Gustavo Dudamel conductor.
- Bellini: La sonnambula, released 24 February 2009, L'Oiseau-Lyre 001238302, conductor Alessandro De Marchi.
- Bellini: I puritani, released 11 October 2010, Decca DVD 00044007433515, conductor Michele Mariotti
- Bizet: Carmen released 28 October 2008, Decca 001216709, conductor Antonio Pappano.
- Donizetti: L'elisir d'amore, released 16 January 2007, Virgin Classics 63352, conductor Alfred Eschwé.
- Donizetti: aria Egli è spento, from Belisario, in Bel Canto Portrait/Nelly Miricioiu, released 14 August 2001, Opera Rara 217, conductor David Parry.
- Donizetti: aria Addio, in Il Sibilo, released 2 December 2002, Opera Rara 219, piano David Harper.
- Donizetti: aria Addio brunetta, son già lontano, in Il Sibilo, released 2 December 2002, Opera Rara 219, piano David Harper.
- Donizetti: aria Malvina, la bella, in Il Sibilo, released 2 December 2002, Opera Rara 219, piano David Harper.
- Handel: Arie italiane per basso, released 1 September 2009, Deutsche Grammophon 000289 477 8361 9, conductor Federico Maria Sardelli.
- Haydn: L'anima del filosofo ossia Orfeo ed Euridice, released 2 November 1997, L'oiseau-Lyre 452668, conductor Christopher Hogwood.
- Mercadante: aria La preghiera, in Il Sibilo, released 2 December 2002, Opera Rara 219, piano David Harper.
- Mozart: Mozart arias – d'Arcangelo, Orchestra del Teatro Regio, released 29 April 2011, Deutsche Grammophon 000289 477 9297 0, conductor Gianandrea Noseda.
- Mozart: Don Giovanni, released 18 July 1995, Archiv Produktion (Deutsche Grammophon) 445870, conductor sir John Eliot Gardiner.
- Mozart: Don Giovanni, released 11 August 1998, Deutsche Grammophon 457601, conductor Claudio Abbado.
- Mozart: Don Giovanni, released 13 February 2007, Deutsche Grammophon 000817509 and Decca DVD 000838309, conductor Daniel Harding.
- Mozart: Don Giovanni, released 20 November 2007, TDK 2103003, conductor Riccardo Muti.
- Mozart: Le nozze di Figaro, released 13 February 2007, Deutsche Grammophon 000987602 and 000987502, DVD 000817509 and 000879909, conductor Nikolaus Harnoncourt.
- Mozart: Le nozze di Figaro, released 3 July 1995, Deutsche Grammophon 445903, conductor Claudio Abbado.
- Pacini: aria Come nube che leggera, in Il Sibilo, released 2 December 2002, Opera Rara 219, piano David Harper.
- Pacini: aria Ecco alfin, in Il Sibilo, released 2 December 2002, Opera Rara 219, piano David Harper.
- Pacini: aria Il paggio, in Il Sibilo, released 2 December 2002, Opera Rara 219, piano David Harper.
- Puccini: La bohème released 14 September 1999, Decca 466070 and 470624, conductor Riccardo Chailly.
  - Puccini: aria "O Mimì, tu più non torni", conductor Riccardo Chailly in La Bohème – The Dream Cast, released 12 November 2002, Decca 472619.
- Puccini: Tosca, released 6 May 2003, Decca 000017112, conductor Zubin Mehta.
- Rossini: Armida, released 4 October 1994, Sony 58968, conductor Daniele Gatti.
- Rossini: Bianca e Falliero, released 11 December 2001, Opera Rara 20, conductor David Parry.
  - Rossini: aria Cielo, il mio labbro inspira from Bianca e Falliero, conductor David Parry in Sogno talor, released 9 September 2003, Opera Rara 225.
- Rossini: Otello, released 8 February 2000, Opera Rara 18, conductor David Parry.
  - Rossini: aria "Che smania! ahimè! che affanno... L'error d'un infelice" from Otello, conductor David Parry, in Tyrants and Lovers, released 13 August 2002, Opera Rara 221.
- Rossini: Semiramide, released 25 July 2006, Nightingale Classics 207013, conductor Marcello Panni.
- Rossini: Stabat Mater, released 1 November 2010, EMI Classics 5099964052922, conductor Antonio Pappano.
- Verdi: I Lombardi alla prima crociata, released 16 September 1997, Decca 455287, conductor James Levine.
- Verdi: Messa da Requiem, released 27 March 2001, Philips 468079 and DVD 000157119, conductor Valery Gergiev.
- Verdi: Messa da Requiem, released 30 August 2005, RCA Victor red seal 61244, conductor Nikolaus Harnoncourt.
- Verdi: Otello, released 11 October 1994, Deutsche Grammophon 439805, conductor Myung-Whun Chung.
  - Verdi: aria "Niun mi tema" from Otello, conductor Myung-Whun Chung in Bravo Domingo!, released 15 September 1998, Deutsche Grammophon 000719102 (re-released as Truly Domingo, 10 October 2006, same catalogue number).
- Verdi: Rigoletto, released 20 October 1998, Deutsche Grammophon 447064, conductor James Levine.
- Giuseppe Verdi: Il trovatore, released 17 September 2002, EMI Classics 57360, conductor Antonio Pappano.
- Vivaldi: Bajazet, released 10 May 2005, Virgin Classics 45676 45676, conductor Fabio Biondi.
  - Vivaldi: aria "Nasce rosa lusinghiera" from Bajazet, conductor Fabio Biondi in Best 100 Vivaldi, released 12 February 2008, EMI Classics 10358.

=== Video ===
- Tancredi (Schwetzingen Festival)
- L'elisir d'amore (Wiener Staatsoper)
- Don Giovanni (Theater an der Wien)
- Don Giovanni (Salzburger Festspiele)
- Le nozze di Figaro (Salzburger Festspiele)
- Carmen (Royal Opera House)
- I Puritani (Teatro Comunale di Bologna)
- Anna Bolena (Wiener Staatsoper)
- Verdi Requiem (Los Angeles Philharmonic)
- L’elisir d’amore (Baden-Baden Festspielhaus)
- Don Giovanni (Macerata Opera Festival)
- Don Giovanni (Salzburg Festival)
