= Pietro Spagnoli =

Italian operatic baritone (born 1964)

Pietro Spagnoli (born 22 January 1964 in Rome) is an Italian operatic baritone. In the 2013/14 season, he sang Sulpice Pingot in Donizetti's La Fille du régiment at The Royal Opera, having made his debut there as Figaro in Il barbiere di Siviglia and having since sung Rambaldo Fernandez in La rondine.
