= María Bayo =

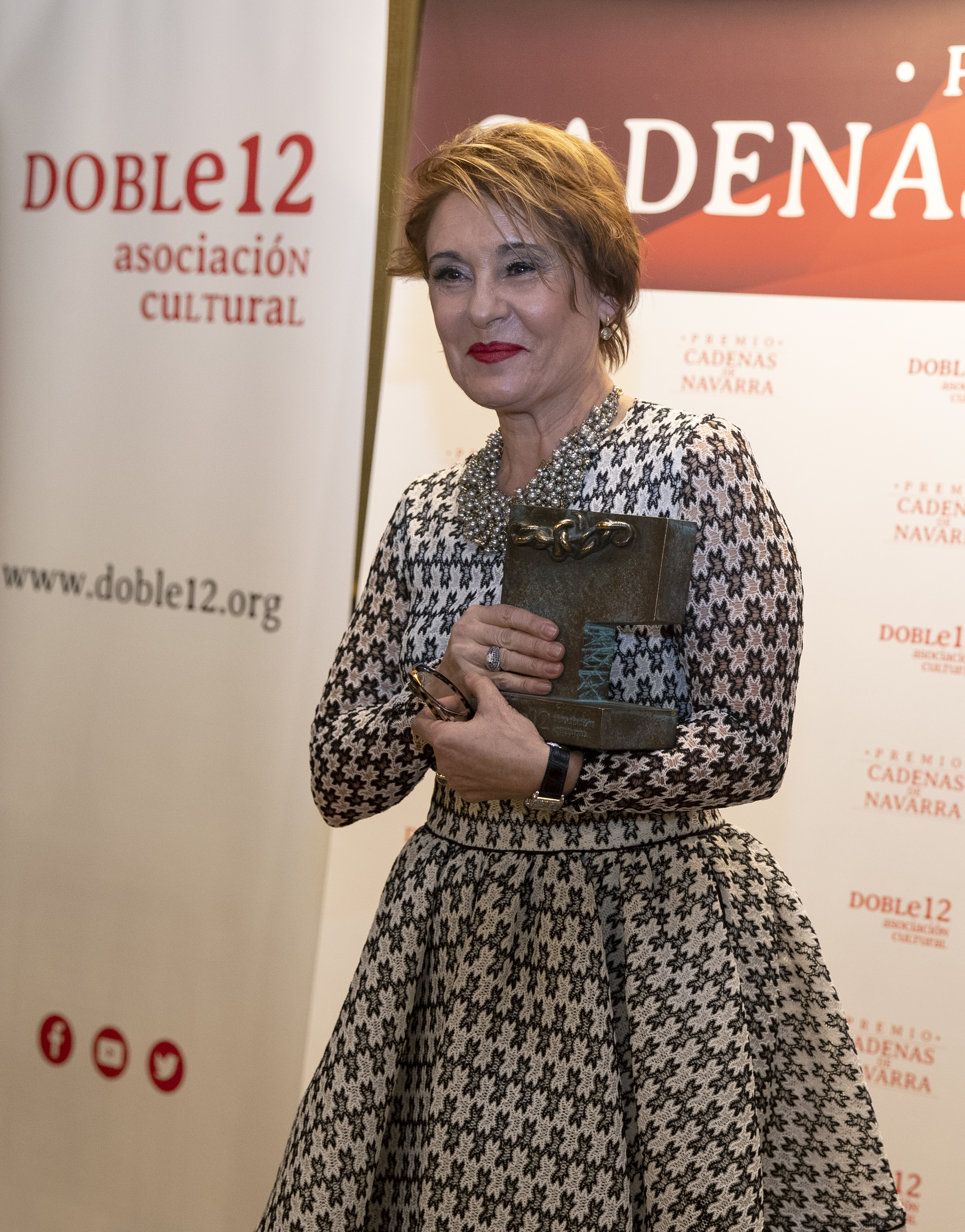

Background information
- Born: María Josefina Bayo Jiménez; 28 May 1958 (age 68); Fitero
- Origin: Spain
- Occupation: Soprano
- Website: www.mariabayo.net

María Josefina Bayo Jiménez (born 28 May 1958) is a Spanish soprano.

== Biography ==
María Bayo was born in Fitero on 28 May 1958. She studied at the Conservatorio Navarro de Música Pablo Sarasate in Pamplona and the Hochschule für Musik Detmold.
