= Silvia Tro Santafé =

Spanish mezzo-soprano

- Born: 1970 (age 55–56); Valencia, Spain
- Citizenship: Spain; United Kingdom
- Education: Conservatorio Superior de Música Joaquín Rodrigo de Valencia, Juilliard School, Birkbeck College.
- Occupations: Opera singer, Concert soloist
- Spouse: Julian Reynolds (m. 2002)
- Children: Sebastian

Silvia Tro Santafé is a Spanish lyric-coloratura mezzo-soprano. In her early career she was best known for her interpretations of Handel and became notable for her performances of Rossini, Bellini, Donizetti, and in recent years Verdi.

== Early life and education ==
Born in Valencia (Spain) in 1970, Tro Santafé graduated at the Conservatorio Superior de Música Joaquín Rodrigo in 1992. She won first prize for "Voice" at the International Jeneusse Musicales competition in 1989, and continued her studies at the Juilliard School in New York in 1992–93, winning the Opera Index Prize in 1992. Tro Santafé continued her studies over the next two years with Carlo Bergonzi at the Accademia Chigiana, and was awarded a scholarship by La Scala Amici de Loggione to study with Magda Olivero. She holds an MA in Arts Policy and Management from University of London Birkbeck College since 2015.

== Career ==
=== 1992–2002 ===
Having studied at the Accademia Rossiniana "Alberto Zedda" in Pesaro during the summer of 1991, Tro Santafé made her international professional debut at the age of 21 in the Rossini Opera Festival during the 1992 season with the role of Lucilla in Rossini's La scala di seta conducted by Maurizio Benini, appearing alongside Plácido Domingo during the Gala de Reyes concert televised for TVE in 1994. In 1995 she made her role debut with the title role of Rossini's La Cenerentola at the Edmonton Opera (Alberta, Canada), quickly followed by her role debut as Cherubino in Mozart's Le Nozze di Figaro at the Santa Fe Opera in the US, before singing Zerlina in Mozart's Don Giovanni at the Teatro Verdi di Sassari (Italy) in the same year. During the season 1996-1997, Tro Santafé returned to Canada for La Cenerentola at the Manitoba Opera (Winnipeg) and sang at the Festival Internacional de Música y Danza de Granada in the role of Caleo of Manuel de Falla’s Atlantida produced by La Fura dels Baus. She also made her UK debut appearing in Mozart's Cosí fan tutte (Despina) at Garsington Opera. Season 1997-98 saw her home country opera debut during the reopening season of the Teatro Real in Madrid in The Cunning Little Vixen and during the summer of 1999 Tro Santafé returned to Garsington Opera for the title role, Isabella, in Rossini's L'italiana in Algeri. She returned to Italy later in the year for Rossini's La Cenerentola with the Teatri Lombardi as well as her role debut in Massenet’s Werther (Charlotte) at the Teatro Sociale di Como and the Teatro Verdi in Pisa. She then made her debut at the Dutch National Opera in Amsterdam in a new production by Andreas Homoki of Bizet’s Carmen (Mercedes) conducted by Edo de Waart.

Highlights of season 2000-01 include Tro Santafé's debut at L’Opéra National de Paris in Handel's Ariodante directed by Marc Minkowski, staged by Jorge Lavelli, which was then taken to the Salzburg Festspielhaus and the Semperoper Dresden. This was followed by Handel's Giulio Cesare (Tolomeo) at the Dutch National Opera in a new production staged by Ursel and Karl-Ernst Herrmann. Later that year, she made her role debut in Rossini's Il barbiere di Siviglia (Rosina) at the Teatro Comunale di Bologna. Season 2001 - 2002 saw Tro Santafé's career taking new heights with her debut at the Staatsoper Unter den Linden Berlin, in Haydn’s Il mondo della luna (Lisetta), a new production conducted by René Jacobs, staged by Caroline Gruber which also showed at the Innsbrucker Festwoche der Alten Music. She made her house and role debut opposite Ruggero Raimondi in the Teatro dell'Opera di Roma in a new production of Les contes d’Hoffmann (Nicklausse) directed by Giancarlo del Monaco. That season Tro Santafé returned to the Rossini Opera Festival in Pesaro for a new production of Rossini's L'equivoco stravagante in the main role of Ernestina, a new production directed by Emilio Sagi and conducted by Donato Renzetti.

=== 2002–2012 ===
During the season of 2002 – 2003 Tro Santafé sang Rosina at the Théâtre du Capitol de Toulouse in Rossini's Il barbiere di Siviglia, which was followed by her debut at the Wiener Staatsoper also starring as Rosina alongside Juan Diego Flórez, a role she then went on to sing more performances of than any other artist in that house. Important role debuts followed including the title role in Handel's Rinaldo in the Staatsoper Unter den Linden in Berlin with René Jacobs in a new production by Nigel Lowery and a new production of Handel's Giulio Cesare (Tolomeo) in the Teatro Comunale di Bologna staged by Luca Ronconi. In that season Tro Santafé also returned to the Staatsoper Unter den Linden to sing Rosina and to the Rossini Opera Festival for a Belcanto solo recital accompanied on piano by Julian Reynolds at the Teatro Rossini di Pesaro.

During the season of 2003 – 2004 Tro Santafé made her debut at the Théâtre des Champs-Élysées in Paris in a new production of Handel's Serse (Bradamante) together with Anne Sofie von Otter, staged by Gilbert Deflo and conducted by Willian Christie, which was recorded. She also made her title role debut at the Gran Teatre del Liceu in Barcelona in the Jorge Lavelli's production of Ravel’s L'enfant et les sortilèges, which was followed by the title role of Cavalli’s Eliogabalo at the Théâtre Royal de la Monnaie in Brussels conducted by René Jacobs. (Note: which also showed during the Innsbruck Festwochen der Alten Musik) Tro Santafé then made her debut at Oper Frankfurt with Rossini's Il viaggio a Reims (Contessa Melibea) and at the Deutsche Oper Berlin in Rossini's L'equivoco stravagante (Ernestina) conducted by Alberto Zedda. This was followed by singing the title role in Gluck’s Orfeo ed Euridice at the Teatro Piccinni in Bari.

In the season of 2004 – 2005, Tro Santafé made her debut at the Teatro La Fenice in Venice in Mozart's La finta semplice (Giacinta). She also returned to the Staatsoper Unter den Linden in Berlin for a new production of Rossini's L’italiana in Algeri (Isabella) staged by Nigel Lowery, and to the Wiener Staatsoper for performances of Rosina. Tro Santafé also made her debut at the Zurich Opera House as Angelina in Rossini's La Cenerentola and to The Dutch National Opera in Amsterdam to sing Handel's Alcina (Ruggiero) conducted by Christophe Rousset. She appeared in the Théâtre du Chatelet de Paris for a concert performance of the same opera. Tro Santafé also sang Alcina (Ruggiero) at the Ópera de Oviedo in Asturias (Spain) and made her debut in Rossini's La Donna del Lago (Malcolm) at the Teatro Nacional de São Carlos in Lisbon opposite Rockwell Blake. The season finished with more performances in the Innsbruck Festwochen of Cavalli's Eliogabalo.

Season of 2005 – 2006 saw Tro Santafé singing again Rosina at the Dutch National Opera in Amsterdam and at the Grand Théâtre de Luxembourg in the Dario Fo production conducted by Julian Reynolds. She went back to the Wiener Staatsoper and the Zurich Opera House for more Rosinas and sang the title role in Handel's Ariodante in Barcelona at the Gran Teatre del Liceu.

During 2006 – 2007 Tro Santafé made her debut at the Bayerische Staatsoper München with Rossini's La Cenerentola and at the Staatsoper Hamburg, followed by Bellini's Norma (Adalgisa) with Edita Gruberová in the title role before returning to the Wiener Staatsoper and the Zurich Opera House for more performances of Rosina. She also debuted at the Theater an der Wien for a new production staged by Laurent Pelly of Mozart's La finta semplice (Giacinta). Tro Santafé was invited for the first time to sing in her hometown at the recently inaugurated Palau de les Arts Reina Sofía for a recital during the cycle of Valencian voices. She returned to Zurich Opera House that season for her house debut of Rossini's Italiana together with performances of La Cenerentola and returned to the Wiener Staatsoper for further performances of Rosina, and to the Staatsoper Hamburg playing Adalgisa in Norma with the Hamburg Philharmoniker conducted by Stefan Anton Reck.

2007 – 2008 season began with Tro Santafé in the Wiener Staatsoper in Il Barbiere, followed by a new production of La Cenerentola at the Grand Teatre del Liceu in Barcelona staged by Joan Font. She then also appeared in the Staatsoper Unter den Linden in Berlin as Rosina and joined Edita Gruberova at the Berliner Philharmonie in a concert version of Bellini's Norma (Adalgisa). A string of performances included L’Italiana at the Semperoper Dresden, Il barbiere di Siviglia (Rosina) at the Hamburg Staatsoper, appearing at the Wiener Staatsoper in La Cenerentola and L’italiana at the Zurich Opera. Tro Santafé returned to the Palau de les Arts Reina Sofia in Valencia for Handel's Orlando (Medoro) in a new staging by Francisco Negrin. The 2008-2009 season saw Tro Santafé appearing in a new production of La Cenerentola at Théâtre Royal de la Monnaie staged by Joan Font, conducted by Mark Minkowski singing opposite Javier Camarena. Tro Santafé returned to the Wiener Staatsoper and then to the Ópera de Oviedo as Rosina in a new production staged by Mariame Clément.

In 2009 Signum Classics released SPANISH HEROINES, her first solo album of arias from operas conducted by Julian Reynolds with Orquesta Sinfónica de Navarra. She also returned for a recital at her hometown concert hall Palau de la Música de València. before returning to the Teatro Comunale di Bologna for a new production of Rossini's La Gazza ladra (Pippo) staged by Damiano Michieletto, conducted by Michele Mariotti. That was followed by her L’Italiana in Algeri debut in the Wiener Staatsoper (Isabella) in the classic Jean Pierre Ponnelle production again with Juan Diego Flórez and Ferruccio Furlanetto. The same year Tro Santafé also appeared in La Cenerentola at the Semperoper Dresden, performed at the Klangvocal Festival in Dortmund with a role debut of Giovanna Seymour in Donizetti’s Anna Bolena opposite Mariella Devia, and returned to Hamburg Staatsoper for Rossini's Il barbiere di Siviglia.

During the season of 2009 – 2010 Tro Santafé made important debuts including the Washington National Opera in her signature role of Rosina, with Lawrence Brownlee conducted by Michele Mariotti. After her successful debut in Washington, DC, Tro Santafé went to Madrid for her title role debut at the Teatro Real with l’Italiana in Algeri conducted by Jesús López Cobos and finished 2009 with L’Italiana at the Associación Amics de s’ópera de Maó in Menorca. Signum Classics also released her second solo album ROSSINI MEZZO. 2010 saw Tro Santafé returning to the Zurich Opera house for performances of La Cenerentola, to the Semperoper Dresden and to the Bayerische Staatsoper München for Rosina and a concert performance of Bellini's Norma (Adalgisa) in Duisburg with Edita Gruberova which followed her success in Berlin two years before. They again performed Norma together at the Théâtre Royal de la Monnaie in Brussels conducted by Julian Reynolds. Tro Santafé then remained in Brussels for a new production of Massenet’s Don Quichotte (Dulcinée) staged by Laurent Pelly, conducted by Mark Minkowski, with José van Dam singing the title role. She finished the season with performances of Isabella at the Wiener Staatsoper, followed by concert performances of Donizetti's Lucrezia Borgia (Orsini) at the Semperoper in Dresden, Köln Konzerthalle and Klangvocal Musikfestival Dortmund with Edita Gruberova, which was recorded (Nightingale).

Season 2010 – 11 began with Tro Santafé's debut at the Grand Théâtre de Genève as Rosina in a new production by Damiano Micheletto of Il barbiere di Siviglia counducted by Alberto Zedda. She then appeared at the Royal Festival Hall, London for a concert performance and recording (Opera Rara) of Rossini's Aureliano in Palmira (Arsace) with the London Philharmonic Orchestra conducted by Maurizio Benini, with further performances of Rosina at the Wiener Staatsoper. 2011 started with a new production of Mozart's Così fan tutte (Dorabella) staged by Philipp Himmelmann and conducted by Teodor Currentzis in the Festspielhaus Baden-Baden, and Mozart's Requiem in the same venue with the Balthsar-Neumann-Chor and Ensamble. This was followed by a gala performance of Isabella at Staatsoper Hannover before returning to the Bayerische Staatsoper München to debut Donizetti's Lucrezia Borgia (Orsini) in performances of the Christof Loy production opposite Gruberova and Charles Castronovo and her debut at the La Scala in Milan with Isabella in Rossini's L’italiana in Algeri conducted by Antonello Allemandi . Santafé finished the season with more performances of Orsini opposite Gruveroba and Pavol Breslik conducted by Paolo Arrivabeni during the Munich Opera Festival.

During the season of 2011- 2012 Tro Santafé made her role debut as Arsace at the Teatro di San Carlo in Naples with a new production of Rossini's Semiramide staged by Luca Ronconi and conducted by Gabriele Ferro. She went on to sing La Cenerentola in Beijing at the National Centre for the Performing Arts followed by a new production of Donizetti's Linda di Chamounix (Pippo) staged by Emilio Sagi, conducted by Marco Armiliato singing with Diana Damrau and Juan Diego Flórez in Barcelona. This was followed a concert performance of Rossini's La Donna del Lago (Malcom) in Moscow at the Tchaikovsky Concert Hall. Tro Santafé returned to the Dutch National Opera for a new production of Handel's last opera Deidamia (Ulisse) produced by David Alden and conducted by Ivor Bolton, recorded for DVD and made her debut with the San Diego Opera in a production of Il barbiere di Siviglia.

=== 2012–present ===
The next decade began with Tro Santafé's return to the Grand Théâtre de Genève for a revival of the 2010 Il barbiere di Siviglia production, followed by a concert in Moscow of Rossini's Petite Messe Solennelle conducted by Alberto Zedda, and Falla’s Sombrero de tres picos with the Oslo Philharmonic conducted by Enrique Mazzola. Tro Santafé also returned to the Deutsche Oper Berlin for Il Barbiere di Siviglia followed by a new production of Donizetti's Lucrezia Borgia (Orsini) at the Théâtre Royal de la Monnaie in Brussels, staged by Guy Joosten and conducted by Julian Reynolds. She sang a Gala performance of Il Barbiere di Siviglia at the National Theater Manheim and made her debut in Verdi's Requiem at the Laeiszhalle in Hamburg conducted by Simone Young. She finished the season with a new production of Mozart's Lucio Silla (Cecilio) staged by Claus Guth at the Gran teatre del Liceu in Barcelona. The 2013-2014 season started with Tro Santafé's debut at the Teatro Massimo di Palermo in a production of Il barbiere di Siviglia conducted by Stefano Montanari, which was followed by further Rosinas at the Deutsche Oper in Berlin, Rossini's L’italiana at the Opéra Grand Avignon, and also at the Palau de les Arts Reina Sofia in Valencia. She returned to Moscow for Bellini's La Straniera (Isoletta) in a concert performance at the Tchaikovski Concert Hall in Moscow conducted by Julian Reynolds, singing with Patrizia Ciofi. Tro Santafé then made her role debut in Bellini's I Capuleti e i Montecchi (Romeo) at the Bayerische Staatsoper conducted by Riccardo Frizza which was followed by more Rosinas at the Semperoper Dresden, finishing the season with further performances of Lucrezia Borgia in the Munich Opera Festival.

The season 2014 – 2015 started with her role debut as Elisabetta I in Donizetti's Maria Stuarda in a new production staged by Moshe Leiser and Patrice Caurier counducted by Maurizio Benini, appearing with Javier Camarena and Joyce DiDonato at Gran Teatre del Liceu in Barcelona followed by Rossini's Stabat Mater with the Royal Liverpool Philharmonic. The 2015 – 2016 season saw Tro Santafé appearing for the first time in Donizetti's Roberto Devereux (Sara Nottingham) in a new production at the Teatro Real de Madrid conducted by Bruno Campanella with Mariella Devia, followed by her debut for the ABAO (Note: Asociación Bilbaína de Amigos de la Ópera / The Bilbao Association of Friends of Opera) in Bilbao again singing Sara in Donizetti's Devereux. Tro Santafé returned to the Bayerische Staatsoper for Orsini in Lucrezia Borgia and to the Gran Teatre del Liceu in Barcelona for Romeo in Capuleti e i Montecchi.

In the season of 2016 – 2017 Tro Santafé was seen as Arsace in Rossini's Semiramide at the Maggio Musicale Fiorentino, followed by Donizetti's Maria Stuarda (Elisabetta) at the Opéra de Marseille and in a new production of Lucrezia Borgia at the Palau de les Arts staged by Emilio Sagi with Mariella Devia. She also returned to the Bayerische Staatsoper to sing Roberto Devereux (Sara Nottingham) with Edita Gruberova then made her debut at the Teatro Carlo Felice di Genova to sing Elisabetta I in Maria Stuarda. She finished the season with Werther (Charlotte) at the Ópera de las Palmas.

Season 2017 – 2018 started with Tro Santafé's return to the Teatro Real in Madrid to sing Cecilio in the Claus Guth production of Mozart's Lucio Silla conducted by Ivor Bolton followed by Gluck's Le Cinesi at the Palau de les Arts Reina Sofia in Valencia conducted by Fabio Biondi. She also sang Elisabetta in Maria Stuarda at the Deutsche Oper am Rhein, followed by her return to Bilbao for performances of Norma (Adalgisa). She finished the season with a role debut as Marguerite in Berlioz’s La Damnation de Faust in a new production staged by Damiano Micheletto, conducted by Roberto Abbado at the Palau de les arts Reina Sofia in Valencia. Season 2018 -2019 began with her role debut as Laura Adorno in Ponchielli’s La Gioconda in a new production by Oliver Py conducted by Paolo Carignani at the Théâtre Royal de la Monnaie in Brussels, where Tro Santafé also gave a recital of Spanish art song with Julian Reynolds. She then returned to the Bayerische Staatsoper for performances as Sara in Roberto Devereux followed by her title role debut with the Washington Concert Opera of Rossini's Zelmira singing with Lawrence Brownlee and conducted by Antony Walker.

2019 – 2020 - 2021 highlights included Tro Santafé's debut as Principessa Eboli in Verdi's Don Carlo at the Teatro Real in Madrid conducted by Nicola Luisotti, followed by Norma (Adalgisa) at the Teatro San Carlos in Naples conducted by Francisco Ivan Ciampa. During the COVID-19 crisis, she was still able to perform in Anna Bolena (Giovanna Seymore) with the Abao in Bilbao, L’italiana at Opéra Marseille and make her role debut as La Principessa di Bouillon in Cilea’s Adriana Lecouvreur at Ópera Las Palmas.

== Opera roles ==
Vincenzo BELLINI

- Isoletta, La Straniera
- Romeo, I Capuleti e i Montecchi
- Adalgisa, Norma

Hector BERLIOZ

- Marguerite, La Damnation de Faust

Francesco CILEA

- Principessa di Bouillon, Adriana Lecouvreur

Gaetano DONIZETTI

- Giovanna Seymour, Anna Bolena
- Maffio Orsini, Lucrezia Borgia
- Elisabetta I, Maria Stuarda
- Sara, Roberto Devereux
- Leonora, La Favorita
- Pierotto, Linda di Chamonix

Georg F Handel

- Rinaldo Rinaldo
- Sesto and Tolomeo Giulio Cesare
- Medoro Orlando
- Ariodante and Polinesso Ariodante
- Ruggiero Alcina
- Amastre Serse
- Ulisse Deidamia

Jules MASSENET

- Charlotte Werther
- Dulcinée Don Quichotte

Wolfgang A. MOZART

- Giacinta La finta semplice
- Farnace Mitridate, re di Ponto
- Cecilio Lucio Silla
- Cherubino Le nozze di Figaro
- Zerlina Don Giovanni
- Dorabella Così fan tutte
- Alto Requiem in D minor

Amilcare PONCHIELLI

- Laura Adorno La Gioconda

Gioachino ROSSINI

- Ernestina L'equivoco stravagante
- Lucilla La scala di seta
- Isabella L'italiana in Algeri
- Arsace Aureliano in Palmira
- Rosina Il barbiere di Siviglia
- Angelina La Cenerentola
- Pippo La gazza ladra
- Malcolm La donna del lago
- Arsace Semiramide
- Contessa Melibea Il viaggio a Reims
- Zelmira Zelmira
- Mezzo-soprano Stabat Mater
- Alto Petite Messe Solennelle

Giuseppe VERDI

- Mezzo-soprano Messa di Requiem
- Principessa Eboli Don Carlo
- Fenena Nabucco

== Recordings ==
=== Operas ===
- 1994 - Bretón - La verbena de la Paloma; with Antoni Ros-Marbà conducting Orquesta Sinfónica de Madrid, Auvidis - V 4725
- 2004 - Handel - Serse as Amastre; with William Christie conducting Les Arts Florissants, Erato Records - 9029590062
- 2004 - Scarlatti - Griselda Op.114 as Ottone; with René Jacobs conducting Akademie für Alte Musik Berlin, Harmonia Mundi - HMM93180507
- 2012 - Rossini - Aureliano in Palmira as Arsace; with Maurizio Benini conducting London Philharmonic Orchestra, Opera Rara - ORC46
- 2012 - Donizetti – Lucrezia Borgia as Maffio Orsini; with Andriy Yurkevich conducting WDR Rundfunkorchester Köln, Nightingale Classics -NC000100-2

=== Albums ===
- 2000 - Rossini: Soireé musicale, accompanist Julian Reynolds. Globe - GLO 6050
- 2001 - A Spanish Song Recital, accompanist Julian Reynolds, with songs composed by Fernando Obradors, Enrique Granados, Joaquín Turina, Joaquín Rodrigo, Jesús Guridi and Xavier Montsalvatge. Globe - GLO 5203
- 2008 - Spanish Heroines, with Orquesta Sinfonica de Navarra, conducted by Julian Reynolds, with songs composed by Rossini, Mozart, Donizetti, Verdi, Bizet and Massinet. Signum Classics - SIG 152
- 2009 - Rossini Mezzo - Scenes & Arias, with Orquesta Sinfonica de Navarra & Lluís Vich Vocalis, conducted by Julian Reynolds. Signum Classics - SIG 170
- 2010 - Massenet: Don Quichotte, with Orchestre et Choeurs de La Monnaie, conducted by Marc Minkowski. NAÏVE - DR2147
- 2012 - Handel: Deidamia, with Concerto Koln and De Nederlandse Opera, conducted by Ivor Bolton, directed by David Alden. Opus Arte - OABD7110D
- 2016 - Donizetti: Roberto Devereux, with Teatro Real de Madrid, conducted by Bruno Campanella. Bel Air Classiques - BAC 130
- 2018 - Mozart: Lucio Silla, with Orchestra and Chorus of the Teatro Real de Madrid, conducted by Ivor Bolton, directed by Claus Guth. Bel Air Classiques - BAC 450
