= Anna Goryachova =

Russian opera singer

- Анна Горячёва
- Born: 10 December 1983 (age 42); Leningrad, Russia
- Occupations: Opera singer, mezzo-soprano
- Years active: 2008–present
- Spouse: Simone Alberghini
- Children: 1
- Website: annagoryachova.com

Anna Goryachova (Russian: Анна Горячёва; born 10 December 1983) is a Russian operatic mezzo-soprano, known especially for her interpretations of bel canto operas.

== Career ==
Anna Goryachova started her studies as a pianist. In 2008 she became a soloist of the St. Petersburg Chamber Opera.

In 2012 Goryachova made her debut at the Rossini Opera Festival in Pesaro, where she sang Edoardo in Matilde di Shabran, with partners like Juan Diego Flórez and Olga Peretyatko, conducted by Michele Mariotti and directed by Mario Martone. She returned to the Rossini Opera Festival a year after, when she portrayed Isabella in L'italiana in Algeri staged by Davide Livermore.

Goryachova has been a soloist of the Zürich Opera until the 2016/17 season.

In 2014 Goryachova made her Paris Opera debut at the Palais Garnier as Ruggiero in Handel's Alcina, conducted by Christophe Rousset and at the Teatro Comunale di Bologna as Dorabella in Mozart's Così fan tutte, conducted by Michele Mariotti and directed by Daniele Abbado. 2015 has seen Goryachova making her debut in Amsterdam, at the National Opera. In 2016 she sang Adalgisa in Bellini's Norma at the Teatro Lirico Giuseppe Verdi in Trieste and Teatro San Carlo in Naples and she sang once again at the Dutch National Opera, Polina in Tchaikovsky's The Queen of Spades, staged by Stefan Herheim and conducted by Mariss Jansons.

In 2017 she made her debut in the title role of Rossini's La Cenerentola at the Oslo Opera, then she sang Alcina in Haydn's Orlando paladino and Rosina in Rossini's Il barbiere di Siviglia at the Zürich Opera, before portraying again Melibea in Il viaggio a Reims at the Teatro dell'Opera di Roma.

== Repertoire (partial) ==
Role	Title	Composer
Adalgisa	Norma	Bellini
Carmen	Carmen	Bizet
Masha	Three Sisters	Péter Eötvös
Ruggiero	Alcina	Handel
Eustazio	Rinaldo	Handel
Alcina	Orlando paladino	Haydn
Sesto	La clemenza di Tito	Mozart
Dorabella	Così fan tutte	Mozart
Donna Elvira	Don Giovanni	Mozart
Zerlina	Don Giovanni	Mozart
Marina	Boris Godunov	Mussorgsky
Rosina	Il barbiere di Siviglia	Rossini
Angelina	La Cenerentola	Rossini
Isabella	L'italiana in Algeri	Rossini
Edoardo	Matilde di Shabran	Rossini
Melibea	Il viaggio a Reims	Rossini
Olga	Evgeniy Onegin	Tchaikovsky
Polina	The Queen of Spades	Tchaikovsky
Juditha	Juditha triumphans	Vivaldi
Magdalena	Die Meistersinger von Nürnberg	Richard Wagner
Romeo	I Capuleti e i Montecchi	Vincenzo Bellini

== Personal life ==
Goryachova is married to the Italian baritone Simone Alberghini; they have one child.

== Prizes ==
- 2009: Nomination for Best Female Role (Donna Elvira) at Golden Mask, Moscow

== Recordings ==
=== DVD ===
- Rossini, Matilde di Shabran – Florez/Peretyatko/Goryachova – Mariotti/Martone – DECCA
- Rossini, L'italiana in Algeri – Goryachova/Esposito/Shi – Encinar/Livermore – OPUS ARTE
