= Simone Alberghini =

Italian opera singer

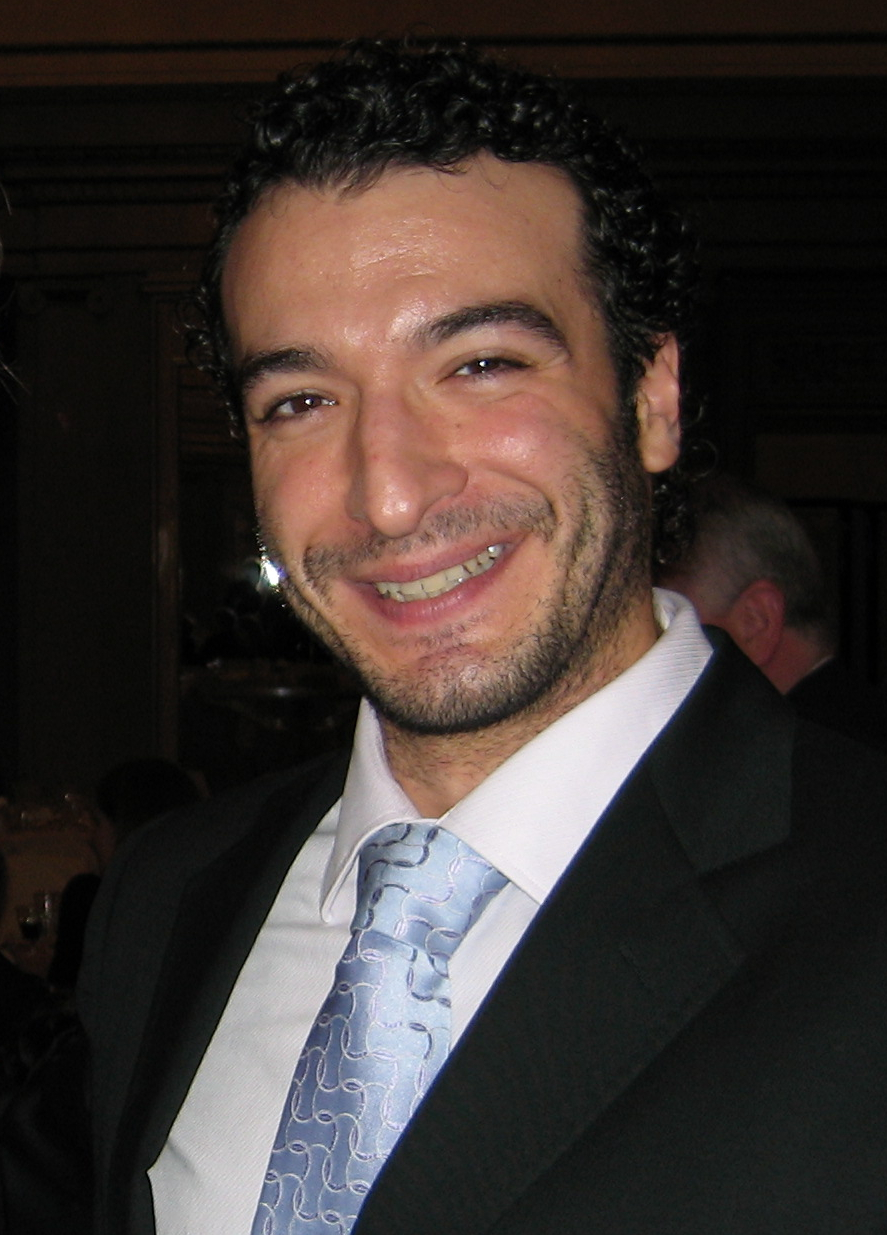
- Alberghini after a performance of Alfano's Cyrano at Teatro La Scala, Milan, 2008
- Born: 16 April 1973 (age 53); Bologna, Italy
- Occupations: Opera singer, baritone
- Years active: 1993–present
- Spouse: Anna Goryachova
- Partner: Anna Netrebko (1999–2007)
- Children: 2
- Website: www.simonealberghini.com

Simone Alberghini (born 16 April 1973) is an Italian operatic baritone, known especially for his interpretations of belcanto operas of Mozart and Rossini.

== Career ==
Born in Bologna, Italy, Alberghini began singing pop music and jazz at a very young age. He then started studying operatic singing with tenor Oslavio di Credico at first, then with the pianist and conductor Leone Magiera and with the baritone Carlo Meliciani.

In 1993 he made his debut as Lorenzo in Bellini's I Capuleti e i Montecchi at the Teatro Regio of Turin.

In 1994 he won first prize at the international Operalia competition, organised by Plácido Domingo in Mexico City.

Since then, he has sung in the most important theatres of the world, like La Scala in Milan, the Royal Opera House in London (Dandini in Rossini's La Cenerentola and Athanael in Massenet's Thaïs with Renée Fleming), the Metropolitan Opera House in New York (Dandini), Teatro San Carlo in Naples, La Fenice in Venice, Liceu in Barcelona, Los Angeles Opera, Wiener Staatsoper, Bolshoi in Moscow and in festivals like Glyndebourne and Rossini Opera Festival in Pesaro.

Alberghini sang under the baton of such conductors as Riccardo Muti, Zubin Mehta, Seiji Ozawa, Michael Tilson Thomas, Riccardo Chailly, Maurizio Benini, Teodor Currentzis, Michele Mariotti, Alberto Zedda and in productions by directors like Jonathan Miller, Luca Ronconi, Graham Vick, Francesca Zambello, Peter Hall, Pier Luigi Pizzi, Damiano Michieletto.

== Repertoire ==
| Role | Title | Composer |
|---|---|---|
| Adelson | Adelson e Salvini | Bellini |
| Sir Riccardo | I puritani | Bellini |
| Escamillo | Carmen | Bizet |
| Il Furioso | Il furioso all'isola di San Domingo | Donizetti |
| Sulpice | La fille du régiment | Donizetti |
| Belcore | L'elisir d'amore | Donizetti |
| Dulcamara | L'elisir d'amore | Donizetti |
| Lord Enrico Ashton | Lucia di Lammermoor | Donizetti |
| Athanael | Thais | Massenet |
| Don Alfonso | Così fan tutte | Mozart |
| Guglielmo | Così fan tutte | Mozart |
| Don Giovanni | Don Giovanni | Mozart |
| Leporello | Don Giovanni | Mozart |
| Conte | Le nozze di Figaro | Mozart |
| Figaro | Le nozze di Figaro | Mozart |
| Les Villaines | Les Contes d’Hoffmann | Offenbach |
| Marcello | La bohème | Puccini |
| Sharpless | Madama Butterfly | Puccini |
| Figaro | Il barbiere di Siviglia | Rossini |
| Selim | Il turco in Italia | Rossini |
| Alidoro | La Cenerentola | Rossini |
| Dandini | La Cenerentola | Rossini |
| Fernando | La gazza ladra | Rossini |
| Podestà | La gazza ladra | Rossini |
| Mustafà | L'italiana in Algeri | Rossini |
| Assur | Semiramide | Rossini |
| Nick Shadow | The Rake's Progress | Stravinsky |
| Rodrigo | Don Carlo | Verdi |
| Conte di Luna | Il trovatore | Verdi |
| Germont | La traviata | Verdi |
| Paolo | Simon Boccanegra | Verdi |

== Personal life ==
Alberghini is married to the Russian mezzo-soprano Anna Goryachova.

== Discography ==
- Bellini, Adelson e Salvini – Barcellona/Scala/Muraro/Alberghini – conducted by D. Rustioni, Opera Rara
- Bellini, I Capuleti e i Montecchi – Mei/Kasarova/Vargas/Alberghini/Chiummo – conducted by R. Abbado, EMI
- Bellini, Zaira – Hernandez/Alberghini/Malavasi/Scala – conducted by G. Sagripanti, BONGIOVANNI
- Giordano, Andrea Chenier – Bocelli/Urmana/Gallo/Alberghini – conducted by M. Armiliato, DECCA
- Martinu, Mirandolina – Bruera/Tonsini/Marabelli/Alberghini – conducted by R. Frizza, BBC
- Rossini, Trovando e Dorliska – Takova/Pertusi/Meli/Alberghini- conducted by Pablo Perez, DYNAMIC

== DVD and Blu-ray ==
- Daugherty, Jackie O – Mc Andrew/Sorouzian/Alberghini – conducted by Franklin, DYNAMIC
- Donizetti, Il Furioso all’Isola di San Domingo – Alberghini/Forte/Marsiglia- conducted by G. Di Stefano, BONGIOVANNI
- Donizetti, Maria Stuarda – Devia/Antonacci/Meli/Alberghini – conducted by A. Fogliani, RAI TRADE
- Donizetti, Maria Stuarda – Piscitelli/Polverelli/De Biasio/Alberghini – conducted by R. Frizza, NAXOS
- Rossini, Guillaume Tell – Alaimo/Rebeka/Florez/Forsythe/Alberghini – conducted by M. Mariotti, DECCA
- Rossini, La Cenerentola – Garanča/Brownlee/Corbelli/Alberghini – conducted by M. Benini, DEUTSCHE GRAMMOPHON
- Rossini, La Cenerentola – Donose/Mironov/Di Pasquale/Alberghini – conducted by V. Jurowski, OPUS ARTE
- Rossini, Trovando e Dorliska – Takova/Pertusi/Meli/Praticò/Alberghini – conducted by V. Pablo Perez, DYNAMIC
