= Sentimiento Latino =

European cover of Sentimiento Latino CD release

Sentimiento Latino is a 2006 album of Latin American popular and classical songs by Juan Diego Flórez with the Fort Worth Symphony Orchestra Chamber Ensemble, conducted by Miguel Harth-Bedoya for Decca.

The album features guest artists Daniel Binelli, Mariachi de Oro, Swang Lin, Xiao-Hua Sheng, Eugene Cherkasov, David Gálvez, Michael Shih, Adriana Voirin DeCosta, Laura Bruton, Karen Basrak, William Clay, Shields-Collins Bray

== Track list ==
- Pedro Elias Gutierrez (1870–1954) Alma Llanera
- José Alfredo Jiménez: Ella
- Chabuca Granda: La Flor de la Canela
- Carlos Gardel: (1890–1935) El Día Que Me Quieras
- Agustin Lara: (1900–1970) Granada (song)
- Anon.: La Jarra de Oro
- José Padilla Sánchez: (1889–1960) Princesita
- Maria Grever: (1894–1951) Júrame
- Manuel María Ponce: (1882–1948) Estrellita
- Chabuca Granda: Fina Estampa
- Noel Estrada: En mi viejo San Juan
- Ernesto Lecuona: Siboney
- Nilo Menéndez: Aquellos Ojos Verdes
- Chabuca Granda: Bello Durmiente
- Chucho Monge: México Lindo y Querido

== Charts ==
| Chart (2008) | Peak Position |
|---|---|
| Mexican Albums (AMPROFON) | 74 |
