= Serafino Gentili =

Italian opera singer

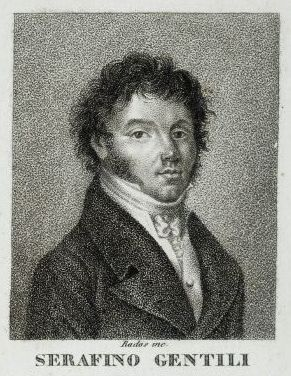

Serafino Gentili (1775 – 13 May 1835) was an Italian opera singer particularly known for his performances in tenore di grazia roles. He sang in opera houses throughout Italy as well as in Paris and Dresden. During the course of his career, he created the role of Lindoro in Rossini's L'italiana in Algeri as well as leading roles in several other operas by less well-known composers. In his later years, he went by the surname Gentili-Donati to distinguish himself from the tenor Pietro Gentili.

Gentili was born in Venice and is presumed to have had his training there, although little is known about his early life. However, by 1795 he was listed as "virtuoso di musica" in Ascoli Piceno, where he made his debut at the Teatro Ventidio Basso in 1796 as Folletto in Antonio Brunetti's Lo sposo di tre e marito di nessuna.

From 1822 to 1824 Gentili sang at the court opera in Dresden, primarily in Rossinian roles. On his return to Italy, his appearances became less frequent. His last known performance was in April 1825 at La Scala where he reprised the role of Lindoro in L'italiana in Algeri. He died in Milan ten years later.

== Roles created ==
- Amorveno in Simon Mayr's Amor congiugale, Teatro Nuovo, Padua, 26 July 1805
- Sandrino in Giuseppe Gazzaniga's I due gemelli, Teatro Comunale, Bologna, 26 November 1807
- Duarte in Vincenzo Federici's La conquista delle Indie Orientali, Teatro Regio, Turin, 8 February 1808
- Lindoro in Gioachino Rossini's L'italiana in Algeri, Teatro San Benedetto, Venice, 22 May 1813
- Gustavo in Carlo Coccia's La donna selvaggia, Teatro San Benedetto, Venice, 24 June 1813
