= Olga Peretyatko =

Russian operatic soprano (born 1980)

- Ольга Перетятько
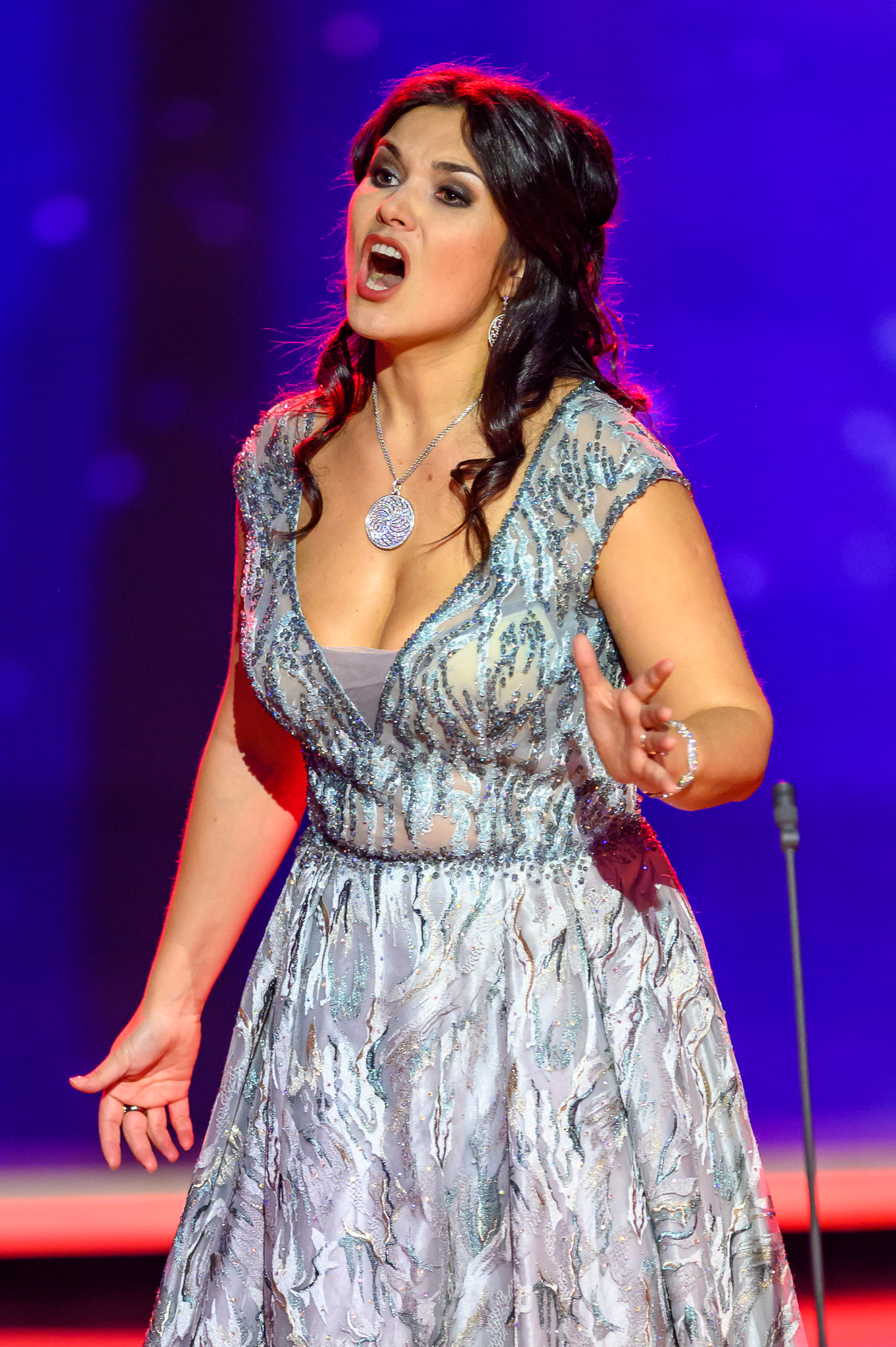
- Olga Peretyatko in 2019
- Born: 21 May 1980 (age 46); Leningrad, Russian SSR, Soviet Union
- Education: Saint Petersburg Conservatory; Hochschule für Musik Hanns Eisler Berlin
- Occupation: Operatic soprano
- Years active: 2005–present
- Spouses: Michele Mariotti (m. 2012; div. 2018) Grigory Shkarupa (m. 2020)
- Website: www.olgaperetyatko.com

Olga Alexandrovna Peretyatko (Russian: Ольга Александровна Перетятько; born 21 May 1980) is a Russian operatic soprano. She has been known for lyric and coloratura soprano roles, most notably in operas by Rossini and Mozart. In recent years, she has been taking up heavier and more lyrical roles.

She embarked on her professional career in Hamburg State Opera's Young Artists' Program and at the Rossini Opera Festival with her collaboration with Alberto Zedda. Following winning second prize in Plácido Domingo's Operalia in 2007, she made her Parisian debut at the Théâtre des Champs-Élysées. She was noticed internationally after performing the title role in Stravinsky's The Nightingale in 2009. She has been performing on leading stages since; she made her Vienna State Opera debut in 2013, and Metropolitan Opera debut in 2014.

== Life and career ==
=== Early life ===
Peretyatko was born in Leningrad on 21 May 1980. Her mother is an economist while her Ukrainian father, Alexander, is a baritone singer. He sings in the choir of the Mariinsky Theatre instead of pursuing a solo career due to her birth. She briefly learned violin when she was 5 before turning to piano. After her parents' divorce when she was 7, she moved to Visaginas, in the Lithuanian SSR, to live with her mother, during the years of which she earned a red-belt in karate. In 1995 she returned to her native city to live with her father. She then joined the Mariinsky Children's Choir, singing second alto, meanwhile studying choral conducting at the Saint Petersburg Conservatory. Contrary to the initial perception and her intention as a mezzo-soprano, she transitioned to soprano when starting private studies with Larisa Gogolevskaya in 2000. She named Joan Sutherland as her inspiration.

She travelled to Berlin in 2001 on her first trip to the West. Impressed, the following year she auditioned and was admitted into the Hochschule für Musik Hanns Eisler Berlin, where she studied under Brenda Mitchell. Due to language constraints, she chose her for her being the seemingly only anglophone teacher available. At the Hochschule, she had her first stage experience with Queen of the Night (The Magic Flute), and subsequently Zerbinetta (Ariadne auf Naxos), Belinda (Dido and Aeneas), Konstanze (Die Entführung aus dem Serail). During her studies, she sought university students who wanted to learn Russian and would offer German in return, to overcome her language barrier, and teamed up with a string quartet performing concerts at hospitals and retirement homes for extra living budget. The experience inspired her to take singing seriously.

=== Career first steps ===
After three years of studies, Peretyatko decided to gain professional experience and only graduated in 2009. Her first engagement was in 2004, as Theofane in Harry Kupfer's production of Handel's Ottone at the Kammeroper Schloss Rheinsberg. In 2005, after performing in Rossini's L'occasione fa il ladro at the Saalbau Neukölln, she was invited to Rossini in Wildbad by its manager to perform in Meyerbeer's Semiramide riconosciuta, conducted by Richard Bonynge. From 2005 to 2007, she participated in the Young Artists' Program of the Hamburg State Opera, where she sang roles such as Papagena (The Magic Flute), Marie (Zar und Zimmermann), Oberto (Alcina), Barbarina (The Marriage of Figaro).

She participated Alberto Zedda's Accademia Rossiniana in 2006, performing in Il viaggio a Reims (Contessa di Folleville) at the Rossini Opera Festival. Recognizing her lyric soprano potential, Zedda also assigned her the role of Corinna in different performances of the run. She became a frequent guest singer at the Festival, performing Desdemona (Otello, 2007), Giulia (La scala di seta, 2009), Aldamira (Sigismondo, 2010), and the title role in Matilde di Shabran (2012). In 2007, she made her Berlin State Opera debut as a Flowermaiden in Wagner's Parsifal, and performed Olympia in The Tales of Hoffmann at the Komische Oper Berlin.

=== Career rise ===
Peretyatko won second prize at 2007 Operalia. Recognised by Dominique Meyer, she was invited to perform in Stravinsky's The Rake's Progress (Anne Trulove) later in November at the Théâtre des Champs-Élysées, where she would later return for Susanna (The Marriage of Figaro, 2009), and concert performances of Giulietta (I Capuleti e i Montecchi, 2011) and Elvira (I puritani, 2012). She had two engagements at the Palau de les Arts Reina Sofía in 2007/08: the Voice from Heaven in Verdi's Don Carlo conducted by Lorin Maazel, and the Forest Bird in Wagner's Siegfried conducted by Zubin Mehta. In 2008, she sang her first Gilda in Rigoletto at the Teatro Rojas in Toledo, followed by later performances in Lübeck, Bologna, Venice, and Avenches. Other performances included Adele in Die Fledermaus (Lyon), Sofia in Il signor Bruschino (Graz), Fiakermilli in Arabella (Lübeck). She performed at the 2010 edition of La Folle Journée in Nantes in a concert with Sinfonia Varsovia, and Strauss' Four Last Songs in the following edition.

Peretyatko gained international attention for the title role in Robert Lepage's production of Stravinsky's The Nightingale, which premiered in 2009 at the Canadian Opera Company then presented at the 2010 Aix-en-Provence Festival and subsequently at the Opéra de Lyon, the Brooklyn Academy of Music in New York and De Nederlandse Opera in Amsterdam. She made her Lausanne Opera debut in Rossini's Otello in 2010, and returned in 2012 for Handel's Alcina, and L'elisir d'amore. She received acclaim for her rendition of Mozart roles, including Blonde in Die Entführung aus dem Serail at the Liceu and Susanna in Florence. The years 2011/12 saw her debuts in some major roles in her career: Adina in L'elisir d'amore in Lille, Lucia in Lucia di Lammermoor in Palermo, and Fiorilla in Il turco in Italia in Amsterdam. In 2012, she sang Adina in Baden-Baden and Lucia at the Deutsche Oper Berlin, and performed in Carmina Burana under Paavo Järvi at the Rheingau Musik Festival.

In 2013, she participated in a run of Lucio Silla conducted by Marc Minkowski as Giunia presented at the Mozartwoche, Salzburg Festival, and Musikfest Bremen. She made her Vienna State Opera debut in Gilda, the role she later performed at the Verona Arena, and her Zürich Opera House debut. She returned to the Hamburg State Opera for L'elisir d'amore, in September for Zerbinetta in Ariadne auf Naxos. She was featured as Marfa in the premiere of Dmitri Tcherniakov's production of The Tsar's Bride at the Berlin State Opera, and later at La Scala. She returned to Russia for a solo concert on 26 November 2013 in Moscow with the Russian National Orchestra. In 2014, she made her Metropolitan Opera debut, where she signed for Fiakermilli in Arabella in 2009, but switched to Elvira in I puritani in 2012 for her increasing fame. Apart from engagements as Adina, she performed Fiorilla in a new production at the Aix-en-Provence Festival, and in a revival in Munich. She was featured in the 2014 Concert de Paris, in Bruckner's Te Deum at the Salzburg Festival, and Tancredi in concert form conducted by Alberto Zedda, as well as Montreal Symphony Orchestra's Asian tour.

=== Mid-career ===
Peretyatko debuted to rave reviews as Violetta in La traviata at the Lausanne Opera in February 2015, followed by a new production of the same title at the Festspielhaus Baden-Baden. She returned to the Vienna State Opera for I puritani, which she then sang at the Teatro Regio in Turin. She returned to La Scala for Rossini's Otello, and performed in L'elisir d'amore at the Tivoli Concert Hall in Copenhagen and La Monnaie in Brussels. She returned to the Metropolitan Opera for Rigoletto, followed by engagements in the same opera through the season, including revivals at the Teatro Real in Madrid, Vienna State Opera, and a new production at the Opéra Bastille.

In 2016, she opened the Vienna Opera Ball together with Plácido Domingo, and performed in Saint Petersburg: Mariinsky Theatre debut in La traviata, and Classics at the Palace Square, concert celebrating the founding of the city. In summer, she returned to the Rossini Opera Festival for Il turco in Italia. Later in the year, she performed in Mozart roles: Donna Anna in Don Giovanni (Berlin State Opera), and Konstanze in Die Entführung (Deutsche Oper Berlin, Zürich Opera House, Théâtre des Champs-Élysées).

In 2017, she returned to the Metropolitan Opera for Rigoletto and stepped into a performance of La traviata at short notice. She performed in Lucia di Lammermoor at the New National Theatre Tokyo, and La traviata at the Bolshoi Theatre. In summer, she returned to Berlin State Opera for her first Leïla in Bizet's Les pêcheurs de perles in Wim Wenders's take, conducted by Daniel Barenboim.

In 2019, she debuted at The Royal Opera, London, in the role of Norina in Don Pasquale. She debuted in Australia in two concert performances of Donizetti's Maria Stuarda at the Sydney Opera House in March 2022.

== Personal life ==
Peretyatko first lived in Prenzlauer Berg during studies, followed by Nollendorfplatz, where she remained residence. In 2018, she took up residence in Lucerne.

Peretyatko met conductor Michele Mariotti while working on Rossini's Sigismondo in 2010. They married in August 2012. On 29 June 2018 she announced on Facebook the filing of divorce and withdrawal from the upcoming production of Don Giovanni at the Teatro Comunale di Bologna which was conducted by her ex-husband. She then started a relationship with Grigory Shkarupa, fellow Russian bass singer. They married on 26 August 2020 in Saint Petersburg. She gave birth to her daughter Maya on 27 January 2021.

== Awards ==
- 2004: Internationaler Gesangswettbewerb Ferruccio Tagliavini in Deutschlandsberg
- 2005: International Belcanto Prize at Rossini in Wildbald
- 2006: 2nd prize at DEBUT Klassik-Gesangswettbewerb in Bad Mergentheim
- 2007: 2nd prize in Operalia
- 2014: Best singer in the Franco Abbiati Prize (awarded on 15 June 2015)
- 2016: Best solo recording of the Echo Klassik award for the Rossini album
- 2018: Best solo recording of the Opus Klassik award for album Russian Light
- 2019: Traetta Prize
- 2024: Hamburger Kammersängerin

== Opera roles ==
- Theofane, Ottone (Handel)
- Berenice, L'occasione fa il ladro (Rossini)
- Tamiri, Semiramide riconosciuta (Meyerbeer)
- Contessa di Folleville/Corinna, Il viaggio a Reims (Rossini)
- Flower maiden, Parsifal (Wagner)
- Olympia, The Tales of Hoffmann (Offenbach)
- Desdemona, Otello (Rossini)
- Anne Trulove, The Rake's Progress (Stravinsky)
- Voice from Heaven, Don Carlos (Verdi)
- Forest bird, Siegfried (Wagner)
- Gilda, Rigoletto (Verdi)
- Blonde, Die Entführung aus dem Serail (Mozart)
- Adele, Die Fledermaus (J. Strauss)
- Susanna, The Marriage of Figaro (Mozart)
- Sofia, Il signor Bruschino (Rossini)
- Giulia, La scala di seta (Rossini)
- Nightingale, Le Rossignol (Stravinsky)
- Fiakermilli, Arabella (Strauss)
- Aldamira, Sigismondo (Rossini)
- Adina, L'elisir d'amore (Donizetti)
- Lucia, Lucia di Lammermoor (Donizetti)
- Giulietta, I Capuleti e i Montecchi (Bellini)
- Alcia, Alcina (Handel)
- Fiorilla, Il turco in Italia (Rossini)
- Matilde, Matilde di Shabran (Rossini)
- Elvira, I puritani (Bellini)
- Giunia, Lucio Silla (Mozart)
- Marfa, The Tsar's Bride (Rimsky-Korsakov)
- Zerbinetta, Ariadne auf Naxos (Strauss)
- Amenaide, Tancredi (Rossini)
- Violetta, La traviata (Verdi)
- Donna Anna, Don Giovanni (Mozart)
- Konstanze, Die Entführung aus dem Serail (Mozart)
- Leïla, Les pêcheurs de perles (Bizet)
- Giulietta/Antonia/Stella, The Tales of Hoffmann (Offenbach)
- Amina, La sonnambula (Bellini)
- Countess d'Almaviva, The Marriage of Figaro (Mozart)
- Rosina, The Barber of Seville (Rossini)
- Anna Bolena, Anna Bolena (Donizetti)
- Norina, Don Pasquale (Donizetti)
- Pamina, The Magic Flute (Mozart)
- Marguerite, Faust (Gounod)
- Norma, Norma (Bellini)

== Discography ==
- 2006: Semiramide riconosciuta, Meyerbeer. Label: Naxos (Naxos Series: Opera Classics), catalogue no: 8.660205-06
- 2008: La donna del lago, Rossini. Label: Naxos, catalogue no: 8.660235-36
- 2011: La bellezza del canto, Münchner Rundfunkorchester, Miguel Gómez-Martínez, first solo recital CD (Sony)
- 2014: Arabesque, NDR Sinfonieorchester, Enrique Mazzola (Sony)
- 2015: Rossini!, Orchestra del Teatro Comunale di Bologna, Alberto Zedda (Sony)
- 2017: Russian Light, Ural Philharmonic Orchestra, Dmitry Liss (Sony)
- 2018: The Secret Fauré: Orchestral Songs & Suites, Ivor Bolton, Sinfonieorchester Basel (Sony)
- 2019: Mozart+, Ivor Bolton, Sinfonieorchester Basel (Sony)
- 2021: Songs for Maya, Semjon Skigin (Melodiya)

== Documentary ==
- Olga Peretyatko: My Love for Rossini (2016). directed by Gabriele Cazzola.
