= Marietta Marcolini =

Italian opera singer (1780–1855)

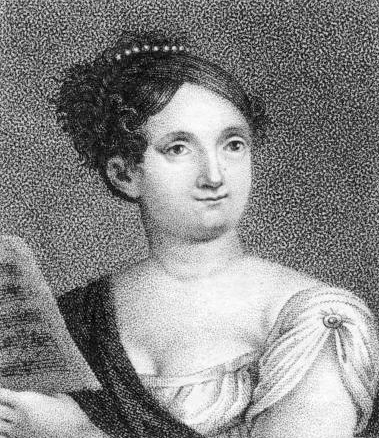
Marietta Marcolini

Marietta Marcolini (born c. 1780 – 26 December 1855) was an Italian operatic contralto.

Marcolini was born in Florence. The date of her stage debut is unknown, but she was appearing in Venice in 1800. She subsequently sang in Naples, Livorno, Pisa, Rome and Milan, singing in the premieres of Pietro Carlo Guglielmi's La serva bizzarra (Naples 1803), Giacomo Tritto's Andromaca e Pirro (Rome 1807), Giuseppe Nicolini's Traiano in Dacia (Rome 1807), Carlo Bigatti's L'amante prigioniero (Milan 1809) and Ercole Paganini's Le rivale generose (Milan 1809). Rossini wrote five parts for her between 1811 and 1814 which – by their subject matter and technical difficulty – justify Marcolini's contemporary reputation for talent as a comedian and a splendid voice.

== Rossini roles created ==
- Ernestina in Rossini's L'equivoco stravagante (Bologna 1811)
- Ciro in Rossini's Ciro in Babilonia (Ferrara 1812)
- Clarice in Rossini's La pietra del paragone (Milan 1812)
- Isabella in Rossini's L'italiana in Algeri (Venice 1813)
- Sigismondo in Rossini's Sigismondo (Venice 1814)

== Sources ==
- Forbes, Elizabeth (1992), 'Marcolini, Marietta' in The New Grove Dictionary of Opera, ed. Stanley Sadie (London) ISBN 0-333-73432-7
- Warrack, John and West, Ewan (1992), The Oxford Dictionary of Opera, 782 pages, ISBN 0-19-869164-5
- Appolonia, Giorgio, EDA, Torino (1992), Le voci di Rossini
