= Paolo Rosich =

Spanish opera-singer and librettist

Paolo (Pablo) Rosich (1780 – after 1832) was a Spanish-born opera singer and librettist widely known by the Italianized version of his first name. A skilled comic actor, he performed leading basso buffo roles in many Italian opera houses as well as in Lisbon, London, Madrid and New York. Rosich created the roles of Taddeo in Gioachino Rossini's L'italiana in Algeri and Buralicchio in Rossini's L'equivoco stravagante and also wrote the librettos for two operas by Manuel García: L'amante astuto and La figlia dell' aria.

== Roles created ==
- Buralicchio in Rossini's L'equivoco stravagante, Teatro del Corso, Bologna, 26 October 1811
- Taddeo in Rossini's L'italiana in Algeri, Teatro San Benedetto, Venice, 22 May 1813
- Oranteo in Coccia's La donna selvaggia, Teatro San Benedetto, Venice, 24 June 1813
- Grood ("il Lupo d'Ostenda") in Nicola Vaccai's Il lupo d'Ostenda, ossia L'innocenza salvata dalla colpa, Teatro San Benedetto, Venice, 17 June 1818.
- Wibrac in Coccia's La festa della rosa, Theatro de São Carlos, Lisbon, 13 August 1821
- Anacleto in García's L'amante astuto, Park Theatre, New York, 17 December 1825
- Timoteo in García's La figlia dell'aria, Park Theatre, New York, 25 April 1826
