= La scala di seta =

Opera by Gioachino Rossini

- Farsa comica by Gioachino Rossini
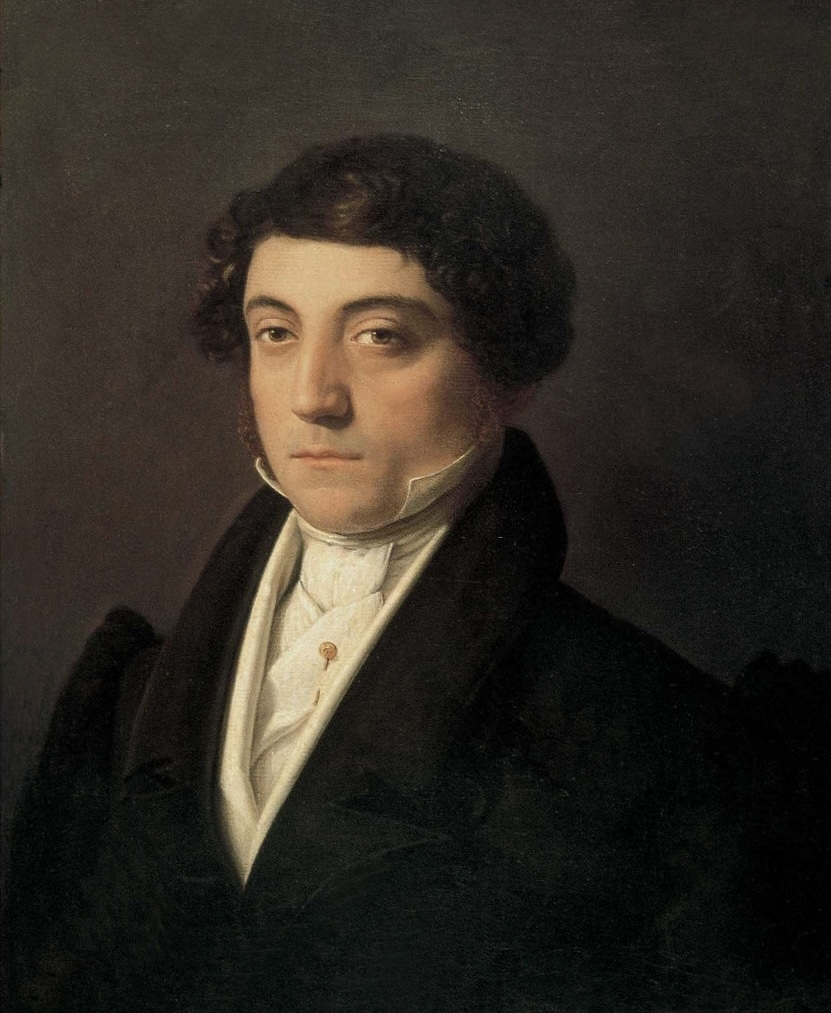
- Portrait of the composer
- Translation: The Silken Ladder
- Librettist: Giuseppe Maria Foppa
- Language: Italian
- Based on: L’échelle de soie by Eugène de Planard
- Premiere: 9 May 1812; Teatro San Moisè, Venice

La scala di seta (The Silken Ladder or Die seidene Leiter) is an operatic farsa comica in one act by Gioachino Rossini to a libretto by Giuseppe Maria Foppa. Adapted from L'échelle de soie by Eugène de Planard. It was first performed in Venice, Italy, at the Teatro San Moisè on 9 May 1812. The overture has been frequently recorded and continues to be featured in the modern concert repertoire.

From 1810 to 1813, the young Rossini composed four Italian farse, beginning with La cambiale di matrimonio (The Bill of Marriage), his first opera, and ending with Il Signor Bruschino. These types of short pieces were popular in Venice at the end of the 18th century and the beginning of the 19th century. The pieces were intimate, with a cast of five to seven singers, always including a pair of lovers, at least two comic parts, and one or two other minor roles. The style called for much visual comedy improvised by the players. As compared to many genres of opera, acting and comedic talent is more important relative to the required singing ability. Rossini's farces also have a significant sentimental element.

== Roles ==
Role	Voice type	Premiere Cast, 9 May 1812 (Conductor: - )
Dormont, tutor	tenor	Gaetano Dal Monte
Giulia, his pupil	soprano	Maria Cantarelli
Lucilla, Giulia's cousin	soprano	Carolina Nagher
Dorvil	tenor	Raffaele Monelli
Blansac	bass	Nicola Tacci
Germano, Giulia's servant	bass	Nicola De Grecis

== Synopsis ==
Time: 18th Century
Place: Paris
Location:The events take place in the apartment of Giulia, pupil of old Dormont

Dormont is the teacher and guardian of the beautiful Giulia, and he is determined that she will marry Blansac despite her continual rejection of his advances. The fact is that Giulia is already married to Blansac's friend Dorvil, who every night is able to exercise his conjugal rights because Giulia lowers a ladder made of silk down to him from her bedroom window.

The opera opens in the morning. Owing to the attentions of Giulia's cousin Lucilla, and the family servant, Germano, Dorvil has great difficulty making his escape by his usual method. Blansac is due to arrive at any minute in his quest to win Giulia's love, but she has devised a scheme to divert his amorous attentions towards her cousin, who would make an excellent wife for him.

Giulia intends to bring Lucilla and Blansac together, and persuades Germano to spy on them from a secret hiding place to see how the relationship develops. Blansac arrives with his good friend Dorvil, who desperately tries to persuade him that Giulia is not looking for a husband. Unfortunately this only has the effect of making Blansac more determined, and more confident of success. He suggests that Dorvil might care to hide and see how successfully he is able to woo Giulia. Consequently, when Giulia enters, her meeting with Blansac is being overheard by both Germano and by her husband.

Giulia decides to probe Blansac to see if he would make a good and faithful husband for her cousin. Her questioning deceives all of the men listening into thinking that she is genuinely interested in Blansac. Dorvil emerges from hiding and storms off in fury, much to Germano's surprise, who also shows himself. In the midst of all the confusion and noise Lucilla enters and Blansac suddenly notices what a fine looking young woman she is. Decidedly prettier than her cousin Giulia.

It is now late evening. Giulia is desperate for Dorvil to arrive so that she can explain the reason why she was questioning Blansac so closely about marriage. Once again the servant Germano is on hand and realizes that his mistress has an assignation. He can only assume that it is with Blansac, and decides to hide once more and see what happens. Unfortunately he is unable to keep his secret to himself and he lets Lucilla in on it. She is distressed to learn that Blansac, whom she now loves dearly, is meeting Giulia and she also determines to find a hiding place in Giulia's bedroom to observe proceedings.

There is general surprise and joyful amazement when it is Dorvil who climbs into the bedroom, followed closely by his friend who is intent on using the silken ladder to further his wooing, not of Giulia, but Lucilla. Everyone scatters when Dormont, who has been woken by all the noise, enters in his nightshirt. Seeing the way that everything has turned out for the best, he quickly forgives the couples for their underhand behavior and all ends in general rejoicing.

== Recordings ==
Year	Cast: Dormont, Giulia, Lucilla, Dorvil	Conductor, Opera House and Orchestra	Label
1953	Piero Besma, Angelica Tuccari, Giuseppina Savi, Giuseppe Gentile	Giuseppe Morelli, Orchestra and Chorus Società del Quartetto di Roma	LP: Period; Cat: SPL 591; LP: Nixa; Cat: PLP 591; LP: Contrepoint; Cat: MC 20.063; LP: Opera Society; Cat: M 2071 36
1962	Manlio Rocchi, Graziela Sciutti, Margherita Rinaldi, Fernandino Jacopucci	Franco Ferrara, Orchestra Filarmonica di Roma; Recording of the soundtrack of a film from «Cine Lyrica Italiana»	LP: RCA Victor; Cat: LM 2650; LP: RCA Victor; Cat: E 5502-3; LP: RCA; Cat: VLS 32512
1983	Tulio Pane, Carmen Lavani, Tiziana Tramonti, Ernesto Palacio	Marc Andreae, Orchestra della Svizzera Italiana; Video recording of a television film	VHS: House of Opera; Cat: VIDEO 1643; DVD: House of Opera; Cat: DVD 1643; DVD: Opus Arte «Faveo» Cat: 4023 D
1988	Oslavio di Credico, Luciana Serra, Cecilia Bartoli, William Matteuzzi	Gabriele Ferro, Orchestra del Teatro Comunale di Bologna	CD: Fonit Cetra; Cat: 102 203; CD: Ricordi/Fonit Cetra; Cat: RFCD 2003; CD: Warner Fonit; Cat: 0927 43307-2
1990	David Griffith, Luciana Serra, Jane Bunnell, David Kuebler	Gianluigi Gelmetti, Radio-Sinfonie-Orchester Stuttgart; Video recording of a performance at the Schwetzingen Festival	DVD: EuroArts; Cat: 2054978
1992	Fulvio Massa, Teresa Ringholz, Francesca Provvisionato, Ramón Vargas	Marcello Viotti, English Chamber Orchestra	Audio CD: Claves; Cat: 50-9219-20
2000	Enrico Facini, Elizabeth Norberg-Schulz, Claudia Marchi, Antonino Siragusa	Alberto Zedda, Orchestra del Teatro Comunale di Bologna; Live recording during the Rossini Festival, Pesaro (6 August 2000)	CD: House of Opera; Cat: CD 706
2001	Andrea Carboni, Gaia Matteini, Silvia Vajente, Samuele Simoncini	Giovan Battista Varoli, I Solisti di Fiesole (Recorded at performances in Il Teatro Comunale di Castiglion Fiorentino (Arezzo), December)	Audio CD: Bongiovanni; Cat: GB 2316/7-2
2009	Daniele Zanfardino, Olga Peretyatko, Anna Malavasi, José Manuel Zapata	Claudio Scimone, Orchestra Haydn di Bolzano e Trento; Live recording in the Teatro Rossini di Pesaro (August 2009)	CD: premiereopera.net
2022	Remy Burners, Claudia Urru, Meagan Sill, Michele Angelini	José-Miguel Pérez-Sierra, Kraków Philharmonic Orchestra; Live recording from the Rossini in Wildbad Festival (July 2021)	CD: Naxos; Cat: 8.660512-13
