= Moshe Leiser and Patrice Caurier =

Moshe Leiser, born 1956 in Antwerp and Patrice Caurier born 1954 in Paris are two opera directors who have worked exclusively as a couple since 1983. They stage productions at theaters in Western Europe.

== Life and work ==
The two directors began their collaboration in 1983 at the Opéra National de Lyon with the opera A Midsummer Night's Dream which is also the work of a duo: Benjamin Britten and Peter Pears jointly adapted Shakespeare's play and wrote the libretto; Britten composed and conducted; and Pears created the comic role of Flute/Thisbe, and later sang Lysander. Since this premiere, Leiser and Caurier have lived and worked together continuously. Jasper Rees wrote that this collaboration of more than 30 years has made them "opera's closest equivalent to Gilbert and George".

For a long time the Belgian-French director duo worked exclusively in France and the French part of Switzerland with occasional productions at the Spoleto Festival USA in South Carolina and at the Welsh National Opera. In 1999, they directed A Midsummer Night's Dream together at Opera North in Leeds. This was followed in 2001 by an invitation to the Royal Opera House in London, where Leiser/Caurier are still involved. In 2008, the Zurich artistic director at the time, Alexander Pereira finally engaged the directing duo for the first time in German-speaking territory. In Zurich, the two directors worked closely and productively with Cecilia Bartoli. In 2012 Bartoli and Pereira - both now in management positions in Salzburg - brought the two directors to the Salzburg Whitsun Festival. A few months later the Bregenz Festival followed, and in 2013 the Theater an der Wien and then the Vienna State Opera, Italiana in Algieri, Salzburg, 2018

Leiser/Caurier works with the same production team, the stage designer Christian Fenouillat, the costume designer Agostino Cavalca and lighting designer Christophe Forey. Several of their productions have been released on DVD.

== Style ==
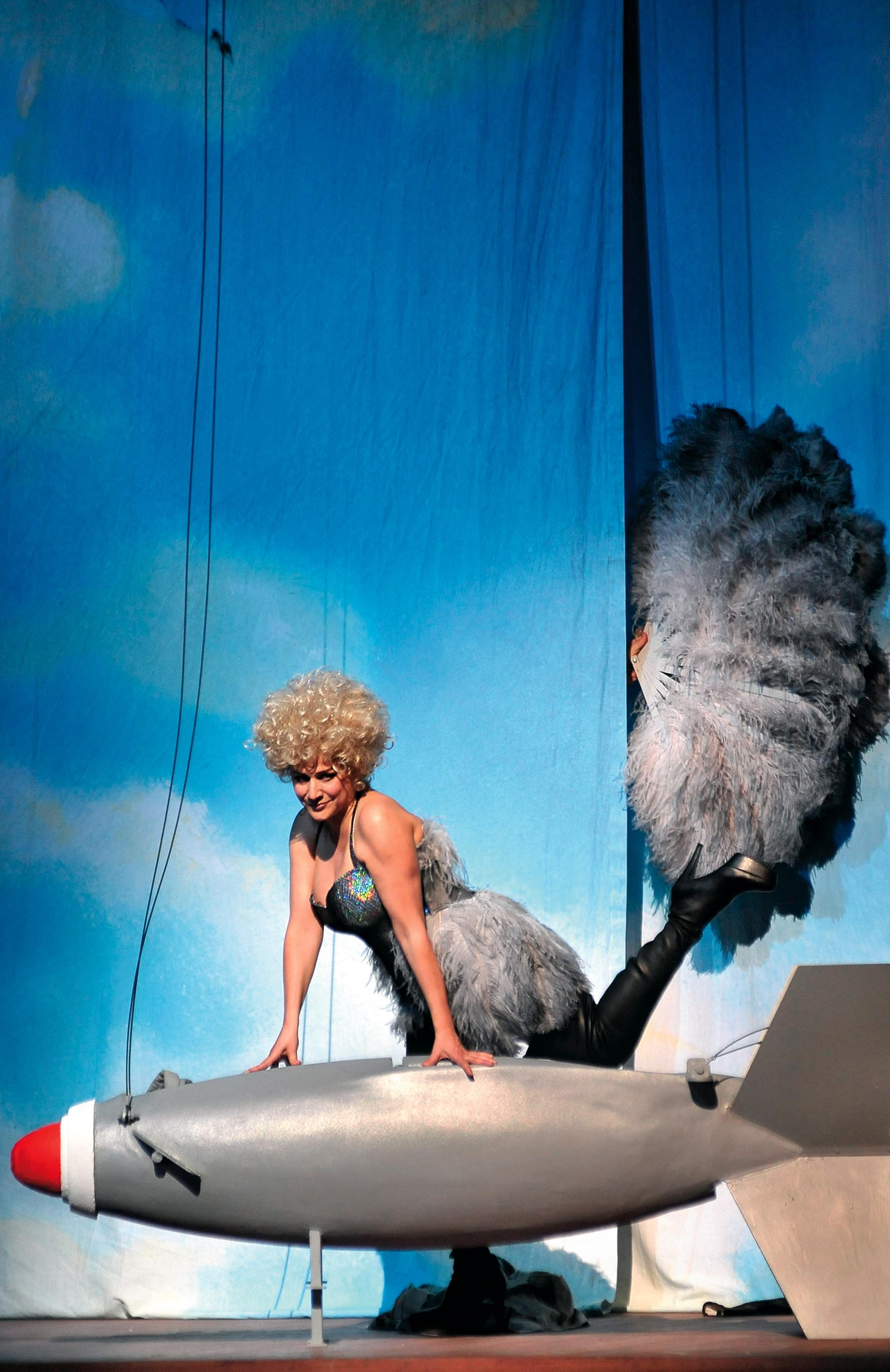
Julius Caesar in Egypt with Cecilia Bartoli, Salzburg Festival 2012

Leiser/Caurier attempt to bring even subject matter that seems remote from the present day to modern audiences by using contemporary expressions and mannerisms. They have two distinct styles. On one hand, there are their settings of comic opera, which show no fear of slapstick and visual effects, and can actually transform banal plots into coherent narratives. On the other hand, they compress the unfolding of tragic events, for example, by shifting Der Ring des Nibelungen to postwar Germany, or Norma to Benito Mussolini-era Italy.

== Directorial work (selection) ==
- Opéra National de Lyon: A Midsummer Night's Dream (1983) – The Child and the Spells (1988/89) – Dialogues of the Carmelites (1989/90) – Ariane and Bluebeard (1998/99) – Betrothal in a Monastery (2000/01) – Lucia di Lammermoor (2002)
- Spoleto Festival USA, Charleston SC: Salome (1987) – Rusalka (1988) – The Coronation of Poppaea (1991) – Wozzeck (1997) – Jenůfa (1998) – Iphigenia in Tauris (2000) – Rise and Fall of the City of Mahagonny (2007) – The Magic Flute (2011)
- Berlioz Festival, Lyon: The Trojans (1987) – Benvenuto Cellini
- Welsh National Opera: Iphigenia in Tauris (1992) – Carmen (1997) – Mazeppa (2005 or 2006) – Fidelio, Orpheus and Eurydice, Eugen Onegin
- Scottish Opera: La Belle Hélène (1995) – Carmen
- Grand Théâtre de Genève: Wozzeck – Hamlet (1996) – Pelléas et Mélisande – Der Rosenkavalier – Der Ring des Nibelungen – Don Carlos
- Opera North, Leeds: A Midsummer Night's Dream (1999)
- Royal Opera House, Covent Garden, London: La Cenerentola (2001) – Madama Butterfly (2003) – Hamlet (transferred from Geneva, 2003) – Hansel and Gretel (2008) – The Barber of Seville (2009) – Il turco in Italia (2010) – Maria Stuarda (2014)
- Mariinsky Theatre, St. Petersburg: Eugen Onegin (2002)
- Gran Teatre del Liceu, Barcelona: Hamlet (transferred from Geneva, 2003) – Madama Butterfly
- Theater Basel: The Love for Three Oranges (2006/07)
- Theater an der Wien: Eugen Onegin (guest performance from the Mariinski, 2007) – Le comte Ory (transferred from Zürich, 2013) – Giovanni Paisiello's The Barber of Seville (2015)
- Zürich Opera House: Clari (Swiss Premiere, 2008) – Mosè in Egitto (2009) – Marc-André Dalbavie's Gesualdo (Premiere, 2010) – Le comte Ory (2011) – Rossini's Otello (2012, also Vlaamse Opera, Salzburg Whitsun Festival and Théâtre des Champs-Élysées, Paris)
- Copenhagen Opera House: Il turco in Italia (2009)
- Metropolitan Opera, New York: Hamlet (transferred from Geneva, 2010)
- Angers-Nantes Opéra: Falstaff (2011) – Bluebeard's Castle (2011) – The Italian Straw Hat (2012) – The Magic Flute (2014) – Jenůfa, Tosca
- Salzburg Festival and Salzburg Whitsun Festival: Julius Caesar in Egypt (2012) – Norma (2013) – Iphigénie en Tauride (2015)
- The Bregenz Festival: Solaris (Premiere, 2012)
- Opéra de Lille: Jenůfa (2013)
- Vienna State Opera: The Magic Flute (2013)
- Rossini Opera Festival: L'equivoco stravagante (2019)

Opera houses ordered chronologically by the first directorial work in each house. The dates for the premieres are not yet fully verified. In some cases, the productions may already have been seen in previous years.

== Awards ==
- 1994: FIPA d’Or, Cannes Film Festival – for The Child and the Spells
- 2006: BAFTA award – for Mazeppa (Welsh National Opera)
- 2012: Prix de la Critique – for Jenůfa (Angers, Nantes 201X)
- 2014: International Opera Awards, Best New Production Award – for Norma (Salzburg 2013)

== Quotations ==
People think that the director is responsible for what you see and the conductor is responsible for what you hear. I think that’s bullshit. It’s really the director that allows the music to exist and it’s the job of the conductor to make theatre in the pit. If you don't have that you don't have opera.

— Leiser/Caurier, About opera

In the process of socialisation we lose youth and the ability to be totally taken over by poetry. Therefore, the Magic Flute is so great because it tells that - with a tale that touches so many aspects of life.

— Moshe Leiser, "I do not believe in sacred cows"

I am shock and awe. Patrice is reconstruction.

— Moshe Leiser, On collaboration
