= Juan Diego Flórez =

Peruvian opera singer (born 1973)

OSP Juan Diego Flórez
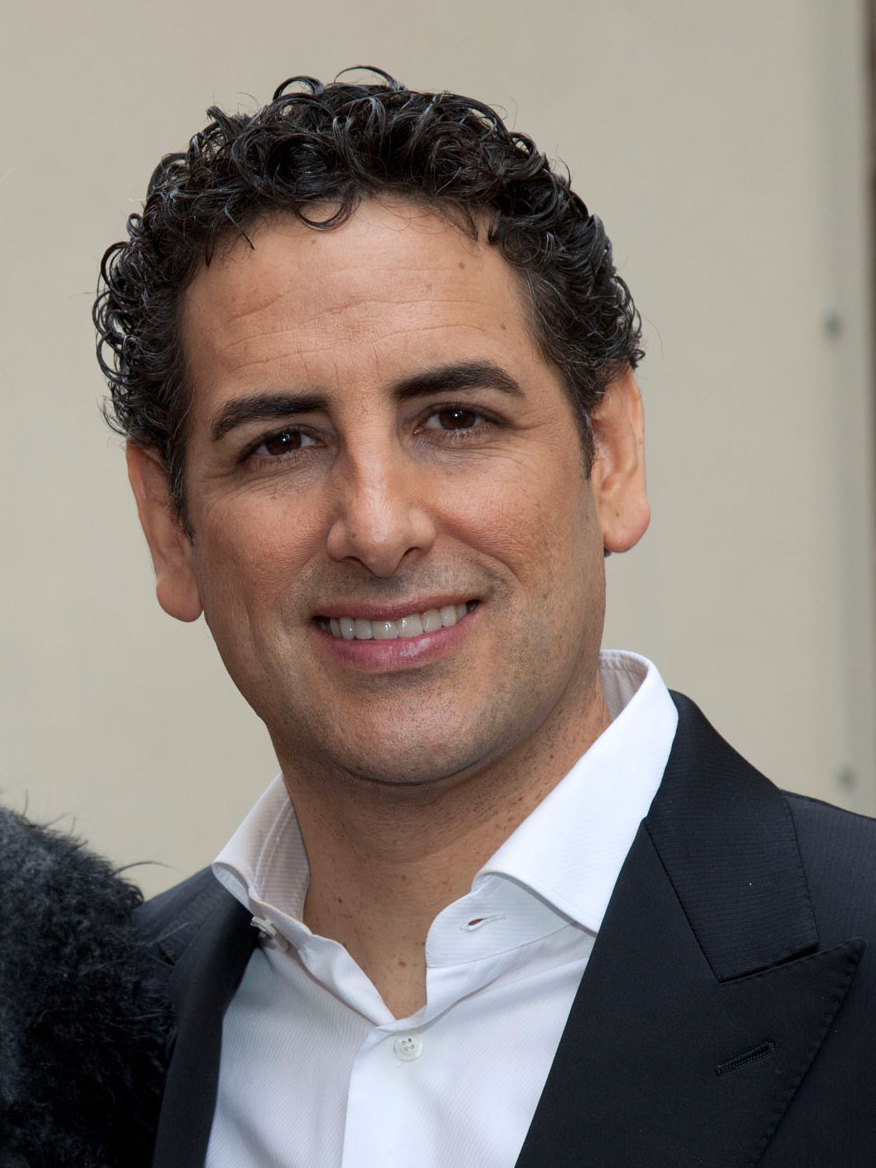
- Flórez, 2015
- Born: 13 January 1973 (age 53); Miraflores, Lima, Peru
- Occupation: Opera singer (tenor)
- Years active: 1996–present
- Website: www.juandiegoflorez.com

Juan Diego Flórez (born Juan Diego Flórez Salom, January 13, 1973) is a Peruvian operatic tenor, particularly known for his roles in bel canto operas. On June 4, 2007, he received his country's highest decoration, the Knight Grand Cross in the Order of the Sun of Peru.

== Biography ==
=== Early years ===
Flórez was born in Miraflores district, Lima, Peru in 1973, the son of María Teresa Salom Olórtegui and Rubén Flórez Pinedo, a noted guitarist and singer of Peruvian popular and criolla music. In an interview in the Peruvian newspaper Ojo, Flórez recounted his early days when his mother managed a pub with live music and he worked as a replacement singer whenever the main attraction called in sick. "It was a tremendous experience for me, since most of those who were regulars at the pub were of a certain age, so I had to be ready to sing anything from huaynos to Elvis Presley music and, in my mind, that served me a great deal because, in the final analysis, any music that is well structured—whether it is jazz, opera, or pop—is good music".

Initially intending to pursue a career in popular music, he entered the Conservatorio Nacional de Música in Lima at the age of 17. His classical voice emerged in the course of his studies there. During this time, he became a member of the Coro Nacional of Peru and sang as a soloist in Mozart's Coronation Mass and Rossini's Petite messe solennelle.

He received a scholarship to the Curtis Institute in Philadelphia where he studied from 1993 to 1996 and began singing in student opera productions in the repertory that is still his specialty today, Rossini and the bel canto operas of Bellini and Donizetti. During this period, he also studied with Marilyn Horne at the Music Academy of the West in Montecito. In 1994 the Peruvian tenor, Ernesto Palacio invited him to Italy to work on a recording of Vicente Martín y Soler's opera Il Tutore Burlato. Palacio subsequently became Flórez's teacher, mentor and manager and has had a profound influence on his career.

=== International career ===
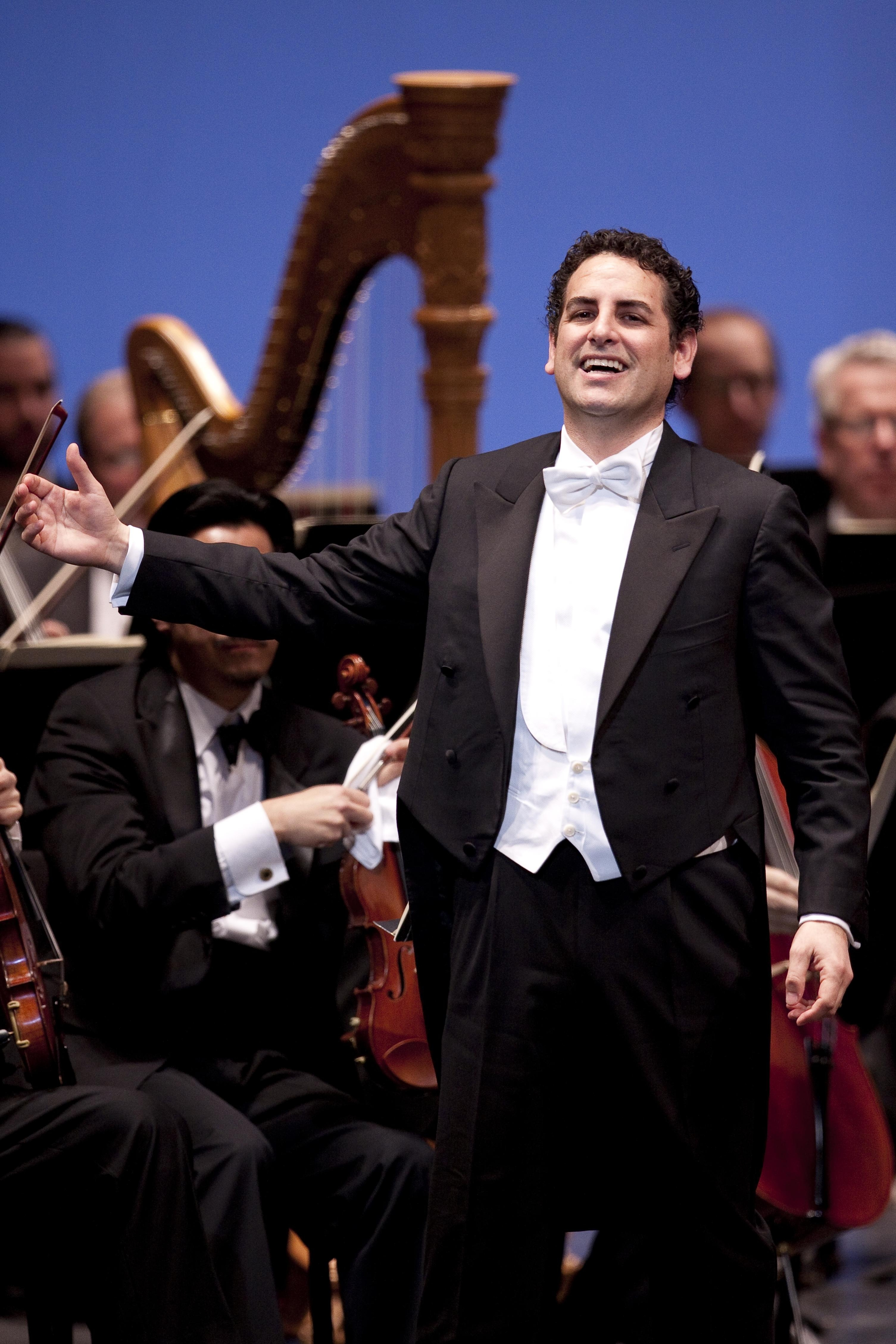
Flórez performing La flor de la canela at the Washington National Opera

Flórez's first breakthrough and professional debut came in 1996 at the Rossini Festival in the Italian city of Pesaro, Rossini's birthplace. At the age of 23, he stepped in to take the leading tenor role in Matilde di Shabran when Bruce Ford became ill. He made his debut at La Scala in the same year as the Chevalier danois (Danish Knight) in Gluck's Armide, and later in the year he sang the role of Georges in Meyerbeer's L'étoile du nord with Wexford Festival Opera. His Covent Garden debut followed in 1997 where he sang the role of Count Potoski in a world premiere concert performance of Donizetti's Elisabetta. Debuts followed at the Vienna State Opera in 1999 as Count Almaviva in Il barbiere di Siviglia and at the New York Metropolitan Opera in 2002, again as Count Almaviva. On February 20, 2007, the opening night of Donizetti's La fille du régiment at La Scala, Flórez broke the theater's 74-year-old tradition of no encores when he reprised "Ah! mes amis" with its nine high C's following an "overwhelming" ovation from the audience. He repeated this solo encore at New York's Metropolitan Opera House on April 21, 2008, the first singer to do so there since 1994.

Flórez is also active on the concert stages of Europe, North America, and South America. Amongst the many venues in which he has given concerts and recitals are the Wigmore Hall in London, the Théâtre des Champs-Élysées in Paris, Lincoln Center and Carnegie Hall in New York, the Palau de la Música in Barcelona, the Teatro Segura in Lima, and the Mozarteum concert hall in Salzburg. In a departure from his usual repertoire, he sang "You'll Never Walk Alone" from the Broadway musical Carousel at the Berlin Live 8 concert in 2005.

He was signed by Decca in 2001 and since then has released six solo recital CDs on the Decca label: Rossini Arias, which won the 2003 Cannes Classical Award; Una furtiva lagrima, which won the 2004 Cannes Classical Award; Great Tenor Arias which won the 2005 Echo Klassik award for the best arias and duets recital; Sentimiento Latino; Arias for Rubini, Bel Canto Spectacular and Gluck's Orphée et Eurydice, recorded live in May 2008. In addition to his official discography, almost all his professionally performed roles have been preserved in radio broadcasts, and many also by television. He also sang the UEFA Champions League Final Anthem in Madrid at the Santiago Bernabeu in 2010.

Flórez was the guest soloist at the Last Night of the Proms in the Royal Albert Hall in September, 2016.

Moving into more lyric roles, he made his debut in Massenet's Werther in Bologna in December 2016, returning to the role in Zurich in April 2017. The Diapason magazine critic described Flórez performance as a triumph, demonstrating his exemplary discipline in accent and phrasing, excellent shading and with the natural allure of a poet.

== Voice ==
Flórez's head and chest registers are perfectly integrated, with no audible break in the passaggio. The ornaments of bel canto, including the trill, are well executed, and stylistic errors such as intrusive aspirates generally avoided. The singer's mastery of coloratura, typified in his Idreno (Semiramide) and Corradino (Matilde di Shabran), has been noted by multiple critics.

== Awards and distinctions ==
Flórez has been recognized by his native country with several awards and distinctions. In May 2004, he received the Order of merit, from the Mayor of Lima; the Orden al Mérito por servicios distinguidos en el grado de Gran Cruz from President Alejandro Toledo; and was named an Honorary Professor of San Martín de Porres University. On June 4, 2007, he received his country's highest honor, the Knight Grand Cross in the Order of the Sun of Peru, from President Alan García. He has been an Austrian Kammersänger since 2012. Flórez also appeared on the 2-sol stamp, part of a series of five stamps honouring contemporary Peruvian musicians issued on November 29, 2004. It is highly unusual for a living opera singer to have been honoured in his home country this way, particularly one so young. (Flórez was 31 at the time). (The portrait of Flórez used on the stamp was by British photographer, Trevor Leighton, and was also used for the cover of his 2003 CD Una Furtiva Lagrima.)

From the classical music world he has received the Premio Abbiati 2000 (awarded by Italian critics for the best singer of the year); the Rossini d'oro; the Bellini d'oro; the Premio Aureliano Pertile; the Tamagno Prize; and the L'Opera award (Migliore Tenore) for his 2001 performance in La sonnambula at La Scala.

In 2009, Flórez was nominated for the Best Classical Vocal Performance in the 52nd Grammy Awards for his album, Bel Canto Spectacular (Decca).

== Personal life ==
Flórez married German-born Australian Julia Trappe in a private civil ceremony on April 23, 2007 in Vienna. They held a religious ceremony at the Basilica Cathedral in Lima on April 5, 2008, which some of Peru's leading citizens, including President Alan García and author Mario Vargas Llosa, attended. Flórez was present at the birth of his son, Leandro, who was born in April 2011, less than an hour before his father took to the stage in Le comte Ory, broadcast live around the world from the Met. A daughter, Lucia Stella, was born in the family home in Pesaro, Italy, in January 2014.

== Roles sung on stage ==
Bellini

- I puritani – Arturo
- La sonnambula – Elvino
- Norma – Pollione

Bizet

- Les pêcheurs de perles – Nadir

Donizetti

- Don Pasquale – Ernesto
- Elisabetta – Conte Potoski
- L'elisir d'amore – Nemorino
- La fille du régiment – Tonio
- Linda di Chamounix – Carlo
- Maria Stuarda – Leicester
- Lucia di Lammermoor – Edgardo

Gluck

- Armide – Le chevalier danois
- Orphée et Eurydice – Orphée (concert performance)

Gounod

- Roméo et Juliette - Romeo

Martín y Soler

- Il tutore burlato – Anselmo (concert performance)

Massenet

- Werther – Werther

Meyerbeer

- L'étoile du nord – Georges
- Les Huguenots – Raoul

Mozart
Paisiello

- Nina, o sia, la pazza per amore – Lindoro

Puccini

- Gianni Schicchi – Rinuccio

Rossini

- Il barbiere di Siviglia – Conte di Almaviva
- La Cenerentola – Don Ramiro
- L'italiana in Algeri – Lindoro
- Matilde di Shabran – Corradino
- Il signor Bruschino – Florville
- Semiramide – Idreno
- Le comte Ory – Comte Ory
- Otello – Rodrigo
- La donna del lago – Giacomo V
- Il viaggio a Reims – Libenskof
- Zelmira – Ilo
- Guillaume Tell – Arnold
- Ricciardo e Zoraide – Ricciardo

Rota

- Il cappello di paglia di Firenze – Fadinard

Verdi

- Falstaff – Fenton
- Rigoletto – Duke of Mantua
- La Traviata – Alfredo

== Discography ==
=== Opera ===
- Alahor in Granata, Donizetti. Conductor: Josep Pons, CD: Almaviva, 1999
- Il barbiere di Siviglia, Rossini. Conductor: Ralf Weikert CD: Live performance (1997), Nightingale Classics, 2004
- Il barbiere di Siviglia, Rossini. Conductor: Gianluigi Gelmetti, DVD & Blu-ray: Live performance (2005), Decca, 2005
- Il barbiere di Siviglia, Rossini. Conductor: Antonio Pappano, DVD: Live performance (2009), Virgin Classics, 2010
- La Cenerentola, Rossini. Conductor: Carlo Rizzi, CD: Live performance (2000), Rossini Opera Festival & Fondazione Cassa di Risparmio di Pesaro, 2001
- La Cenerentola, Rossini. Conductor: Patrick Summers, DVD: Live performance (2008), Decca, 2009
- Le Comte Ory Rossini. Conductor: Jesus Lopez-Cobos, CD: Live performance (2003), Deutsche Grammophon, 2004
- Le Comte Ory Rossini. Conductor: Maurizio Benini, DVD: Live performance (2011), Virgin Classics, 2012
- Don Pasquale, Donizetti. Conductor: Maurizio Benini, DVD & Blu-ray: Live performance (2006), Decca, 2007
- L'Etoile du Nord, Meyerbeer. Conductor: Wladimir Jurowski, CD: Marco Polo, 1997
- Falstaff, Verdi. Conductor: Riccardo Muti, DVD: Live performance (2001), EuroArts, 2003
- La Fille du régiment, Donizetti. Conductor: Riccardo Frizza, DVD: Live performance (2005), Decca, 2006
- La Fille du régiment, Donizetti. Conductor: Bruno Campanella, DVD: Live performance (2007), Virgin Classics, 2008
- Matilde di Shabran, Rossini. Conductor: Riccardo Frizza, CD: Live performance (2004), Decca, 2006
- Matilde di Shabran, Rossini. Conductor: Michele Mariotti, DVD: Live performance (2012), Decca Classics, 2013
- Mitridate, Mozart. Conductor: Christophe Rousset, CD: Decca, 1999
- Nina, o sia La pazza per amore, Paisiello. Conductor: Riccardo Muti, CD: Ricordi, 2000
- Orphée et Eurydice, Gluck. Conductor: Jesus Lopez-Cobos, CD: Live performance (2008), Decca, 2010
- Orphee et Eurydice, Gluck. Conductor: Michele Mariotti, DVD : Live performance (2018), Classart Clasic ( 2018)
- I puritani, Bellini. Conductor: Michele Mariotti, DVD: Live performance (2009), Decca, 2010
- Rigoletto, Verdi. Conductor: Fabio Luisi, DVD: Live performance (2008), Virgin Classics, 2010
- Semiramide, Rossini. Conductor Marcello Panni, CD: Nightingale Classics, 2001
- La sonnambula, Bellini. Conductor: Alessandro de Marchi, CD: Decca (2008)
- La sonnambula, Bellini. Conductor: Evelino Pidò, DVD: Live performance (2009), Decca (2010)
- La traviata, Verdi. Conductor: Yannick Nézet-Séguin. Streaming video: Live performance (15 December 2018), Met Opera on Demand (2019)
- Il tutore burlato, Martin y Soler. Conductor: Miguel Harth-Bedoya, CD: Bongiovanni, 1995
- Zelmira, Rossini. Conductor: Roberto Abbado, DVD & Blu-ray: Decca, 2012

=== Oratorio and sacred music ===
- Cantatas Vol.2, Rossini. Conductor: Riccardo Chailly, CD: Decca, 2001
- Messa Solenne, Verdi. Conductor: Riccardo Chailly, CD: Decca, 2000
- Stabat Mater, Rossini. Conductor: Gianluigi Gelmetti, CD: Agora, 1998
- Le tre ore dell'agonia del Nostro Signore Gesù Cristo, Niccolò Zingarelli. Conductor: Pierangelo Pelucchi, CD: Agora, 1995

=== Recital ===
- Flórez para Chabuca (with Rubén Flórez, his father). Quadrasonic Ideas y Morrison Music & Video.
- Canto al Peru (with Ernesto Palacio). Piano: Samuele Pala, CD: Bongiovanni, 1997
- Rossiniana. Conductor: Manlio Benzi, CD: Agora, 1998
- Vesselina Kasarova Arias & Duets. Conductor: Arthur Fagen, CD: RCA, 1999
- Rossini Arias. Conductor: Riccardo Chailly, CD: Decca, 2002
- Una Furtiva Lagrima, Bellini, Donizetti. Conductor: Riccardo Frizza, CD: Decca, 2003
- Great Tenor Arias, Verdi, Gluck, Rossini. Conductor: Carlo Rizzi, CD: Decca, 2004
- Sentimiento Latino, Spanish & Latin American songs. Conductor: Miguel Harth-Bedoya, CD: Decca, 2006
- Arias for Rubini, Bellini, Donizetti, Rossini. Conductor: Roberto Abbado, CD: Decca 2007
- Bel Canto Spectacular, Bellini & Donizetti arias & duets. Conductor: Daniel Oren, CD: Decca 2008
- Celebración – 2010 Opening night concert at Walt Disney Concert Hall, Los Angeles, Rossini, Donizetti and Verdi arias and Latin American songs. Conductor: Gustavo Dudamel, DVD: Deutsche Grammophon 2010
- Santo, sacred songs. Conductor: Michele Mariotti, CD: Decca 2010
- L'amour, French arias. Conductor: Roberto Abbado, CD: Decca 2014
- Mozart. Conductor: Riccardo Minasi, CD: Sony 2017
