= Matilde di Shabran =

Opera by Gioachino Rossini

- Opera semiseria by Gioachino Rossini
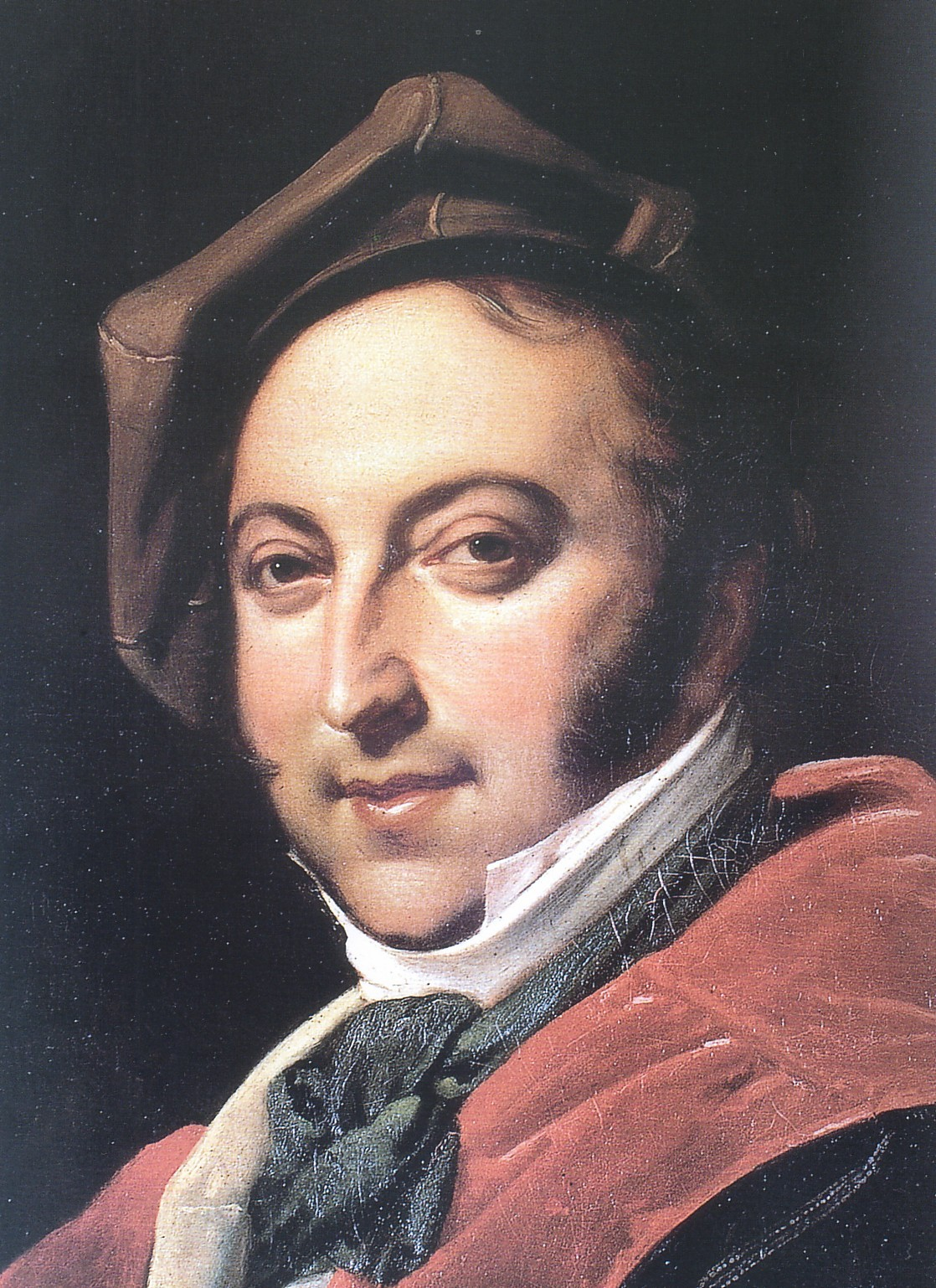
- Rossini in 1820
- Librettist: Jacopo Ferretti
- Language: Italian
- Based on: Libretto for Méhul's Euphrosine
- Premiere: 24 February 1821; Teatro Apollo, Rome

Matilde di Shabran (full title: Matilde di Shabran, o sia Bellezza e Cuor di ferro; English: Matilde of Shabran, or Beauty and Ironheart) is an opera semiseria in two acts by Gioachino Rossini to a libretto by Jacopo Ferretti after François-Benoît Hoffman’s libretto for Méhul’s Euphrosine (1790, Paris) and J. M. Boutet de Monvel's play Mathilde. The opera was first performed in Rome at the Teatro Apollo, 24 February 1821 conducted by the violinist Niccolo Paganini. The premiere was followed by a street brawl "between Rossini's admirers and his detractors."

== Versions ==
Three authentic versions of Matilde di Shabran exist. These are: the Rome version (24 February 1821); the Naples version (11 November 1821), and the Vienna version (7 May 1822). It is unlikely that Rossini participated directly in the 15 October 1821 performance that took place in Paris.

== Performance history ==
After the mixed reception at the premiere, performances continued at Teatro Apollo until the end of the season, and Matilde di Shabran went the rounds of other Italian cities. The opera appears to have been popular, with presentations in Europe (London on 3 July 1823) and New York (10 February 1834). However, apart from an 1892 staging in Florence, it was not staged again until 1974 in Genoa." This 1974 performance used the Roman version. The Roman version was also used in a performance of Matilde di Shabran as an oratorio in Paris in 1981. A revised version of the score was presented at the Rossini Opera Festival in Pesaro in 1996, 2004 and 2012, as well as at the Royal Opera, London in 2008; these three presentations have used the Neapolitan version; Juan Diego Flórez sang the role of Corradino each time. A 1998 performance at the Rossini in Wildbad Belcanto Opera Festival used the Viennese version.

== Roles ==
Role	Voice type	Premiere Cast, 24 February 1821 (Conductor: Niccolo Paganini )
Corradino, Cuor di ferro	tenor	Giuseppe Fusconi
Matilde di Shabran	soprano	Caterina Liparini
Raimondo Lopez, father of Edoardo	bass	Carlo Moncada
Edoardo	contralto	Annetta Parlamagni
Aliprando, physician	baritone	Giuseppe Fioravanti
Isidoro, poet	bass	Antonio Parlamagni
Contessa d'Arco	mezzo-soprano	Luigia Cruciati
Ginardo, keeper of the tower	bass	Antonio Ambrosi
Egoldo, leader of the peasants	tenor	Gaetano Rambaldi
Rodrigo, leader of the guards	tenor	Gaetano Rambaldi
Udolfo, jailer	silent	
Male chorus of guards and peasants. Female chorus of peasants sometimes used in Act II

== Synopsis ==
Place: In and around Corradino's gothic castle in Spain
Time: The Middle Ages

=== Act 1 ===
Scene 1: Outside the castle gatehouse

Egoldo and some peasants arrive with some of their produce, which they hope Corradino will accept (Zitti; nessun qui v'è - "Quiet, no-one is here"). Aliprando draws their attention to two inscriptions on the castle gates (Chi vi guida a queste mura? - "Who brings you to these walls?"), but since the peasants have not been taught to read, he is obliged to read them out: "Anyone entering without permission will have their heads split in two" and "Anyone who disturbs the peace will be starved to death". He and Ginardo confirm that the ferocious Corradino will have no hesitation in carrying out these threats, and furthermore he has a particular hatred of women (Se viene il Cerbero fioccano i guai - "When Cerberus comes, woes rain down"). The alarmed peasants disperse rapidly. Ginardo asks Udolfo to check that Corradino's prisoners are not being ill-treated, except that he himself will visit the most recent arrival, Edoardo, the son of Corradino's enemy Raimondo Lopez.

The wandering poet Isidoro arrives with his guitar at the castle, tired, hungry and thirsty, having travelled all the way from Naples. Seeing the castle, he hopes that his luck will change (Cavatina: Intanto Armenia 'nfra l'ombrose piante - "Meanwhile, Armenia, through the shady trees"), but, when he sees the inscriptions, his instinct is to flee. But he accidentally runs into Ginardo, who tells him that it is too late. Corradino, armed and surrounded by guards, makes his appearance and demands to know who Isidoro is and why he is there (Quartet: Alma rea! Perché t'involi? - "Wicked man! Why are you running away?"). Isidoro tries to curry favour with Corradino by offering to serenade his ladies, but this enrages the tyrant further. He is about to kill the poet when Aliprando intervenes. Corradino relents, but Isidoro is marched off to the dungeons by Ginardo.

Aliprando tells Corradino that Matilde, whose father, Shabran, has been killed in battle, is approaching the castle. With his dying breath, Shabran commended her to Corradino's care. Corradino, who respected Shabran, agrees to accommodate Matilde in fine apartments, but wishes her to be kept out of his sight unless he summons her. Aliprando goes to meet her.

Ginardo returns, telling Corradino that Edoardo is weeping and may be repentant. But when he brings the chained prisoner to Corradino, it is clear that Edoardo remains defiant. Corradino demands that he acknowledge him as the victor over his father. Edoardo refuses (Cavatina: Piange il mio ciglio, è vero - "It's true that tears fall from my eyes"), but Corradino has his chains removed and will give him the run of the castle if he promises not to escape. Edoardo agrees and goes in. Ginardo reports that Aliprando and Matilde are approaching the castle. Corradino vows to find Matilde a husband and supply her with a dowry, but will see her as little as possible. Ginardo, alone, muses that a heart of iron ("cuor di ferro") may not be enough to save his master from Cupid's darts.

Scene 2: A magnificent gallery in the castle

Matilde tells Aliprando that Corradino will yield to her (Duet: Di capricci, di smorfiette - "I've caprices, little glances"). The physician is not so sure, but he admires her spirit and tells her that Corradino, despite his warlike demeanour, runs to him whenever he has a headache or a cold. Maybe his dislike of women can be overcome.

Ginardo announces the arrival of the Contessa d'Arco, who, as a result of a peace treaty, was promised in marriage to Corradino. He had immediately repudiated her, but was obliged to agree that he would not marry anyone else. The Countess has heard that Matilde is to be accommodated in the castle and intends to have her evicted. The women insult each other, and the resulting noise brings Corradino and his guards to the gallery (Quintet: Questa è la Dea? Che aria! - "This is the goddess? What a picture!"). Matilde stands firm, Ginardo and Aliprando are amazed that Corradino makes no attempt to kill her for her impertinence, and the Countess is further enraged. Corradino is confused - his head is spinning and his blood is burning. He asks Ginardo to look after Matilde, and departs with Aliprando. The Countess storms off, pursued by Matilde.

Corradino asks Aliprando what is wrong with him, and is told that he is lovesick, which is a disease with no cure. Aliprando leaves, and Corradino summons Isidoro, whom he suspects of bewitching him, from his prison. Isidoro, in fear of his life, has no idea what he is talking about, but, just when Corradino is about to have him torn into pieces, a contrite Matilde appears. Ginardo is to take Isidoro back to the dungeon, but the two of them hide in order to watch developments. The bemused Corradino succumbs to Matilde's wiles (Finale: Ah! Capisco; non parlate - "Ah! I understand, do not speak"), and falls at her feet just as Aliprando arrives to announce that Raimondo and his troops are on their way to rescue Edoardo. Corradino leaves to give orders to the guards, taking Matilde with him, as the others comment on his surrender to her.

Scene 3: Outside the castle gatehouse

Edoardo, Rodrigo and the guards await the enemy. Corradino, Matilde, Aliprando and Ginardo come through the gate, together with Isidoro and his guitar (he has appointed himself court poet). The Countess follows them. When Corradino tells Edoardo that his father will be defeated, Edoardo is overcome, but when Matilde comforts the boy, Corradino succumbs to jealousy. An ensemble (Oh come mai quest'anima sfavilla in un momento! - "Oh, how my soul flares up in a minute!") develops, Isidoro urges the guards onwards, and the curtain falls.

=== Act 2 ===
Scene 1: The countryside near the castle

Isidoro, sitting in a tree, is writing about his exploits. The peasants and Corradino's troops arrive (Di Corradino il nome per ogni suol rimbomba - "May the name of Corradino resound in every country"), and, although they know that most of what Isidoro has written is made up, he persuades them that that's what poets do (Le penne de i poeti so spade assai diverse - "Poets' pens are quite different weapons"), and they nevertheless salute him and take him with them.

Raimondo appears, laments the loss of his son, and departs. Edoardo, dispirited, longs for death (Cavatina: Ah! perché, perché la morte non ascolta i pianti miei - "Ah, why, why does death ignore my tears") but then he hears Raimondo calling his name. Corradino and Raimondo arrive simultaneously, but, before they can fight, Edoardo takes Raimondo's place. As he fights Corradino, he tells him that it was Matilde who set him free. Corradino rushes off in a rage, and father and son leave together.

Scene 2: The gallery in the castle

The Countess reveals that Edoardo had bribed the guards and escaped. She is sure that Corradino will blame Matilde, who now arrives, followed by Isidoro. He tells the ladies how he saved the day by taking command of the army. Ginardo and Aliprando confirm that the enemy has been routed, but add that Corradino ran off to find Raimondo and challenge him to a duel. Corradino returns, demanding to see Edoardo, but Ginardo discovers that he has escaped. Corradino starts to question Matilde, but Rodrigo enters with a letter for her. It is from Edoardo, who swears undying love for her and thanks her for allowing him to escape. Corradino condemns her to death, to the delight of the Countess (Sextet: È palese il tradimento - "Her treachery is obvious"). Isidoro and the guards are to take Matilde to a deep chasm and throw her in. Corradino, alone, meditates on his revenge. He is joined by some peasant women, but their pleas that Matilde be saved (Mandare a morte quella meschina? - "Are you really sending that poor girl to her death?") fall on deaf ears. As they leave, Isidoro, Ginardo, Aliprando and the Countess return. Isidoro describes how he kicked Matilde into the gorge, amid conflicting emotions from the others.

Suddenly, Edoardo appears and describes how the Countess bribed Udolfo to release him, with the intention of throwing the blame on Matilde. The Countess flees Corradino's wrath, and he and Edoardo lament Matilde's death (Duet: Da cento smanie, e cento sento straziarmi il cor - "A hundred agonies, and then a hundred more, pierce my heart").

Scene 3: Outside Raimondo's castle: a steep mountain with a raging torrent plunging into a gorge

Isidoro is at the foot of the mountain and Corradino is above, planning to throw himself off in order to atone for Matilde's death. But before he can do so, a bell rings and Raimondo emerges from the castle. Aliprando and Ginardo try to restrain Corradino as Edoardo rushes into the castle, immediately returning with Matilde. Isidoro admits that he made up the story of Matilde's death, Matilde thanks Edoardo, instructs Corradino to make peace with Raimondo and regrets that the Countess is not there to see her triumph. She and Corradino are reunited, and, to general rejoicing, she sings in praise of love (Ami alfine? E chi non ama? - "Are you at last in love? Who does not love?") as the peasants comment: "Women are born to conquer and rule".

== Recordings ==
Year	Cast (Matilde di Shabran, Edoardo, Contessa d'Arco, Corradino Cuor di Ferro)	Conductor, Opera House and Orchestra	Label
1998	Akie Amou, Roswitha Muller, Agata Bienkowska, Ricardo Bernal	Francesco Corti, I Virtuosi di Praga and the Coro da camera di Czechia (Recording of a performance at the Rossini in Wildbad BelCanto Opera Festival in the Kurhaus, Kursaal, Bad Wildbad, Germany, 22 and 25 July 1998)	Audio CD: Bongiovanni, Bologna; Cat: GB 2242/44-2; ASIN: B00004R8MY
2004	Annick Massis, Hadar Halevy, Chiara Chialli, Juan Diego Flórez	Riccardo Frizza, Orchestra Sinfónica de Galicia and the Prague Chamber Choir (Recording of a performance at the Rossini Opera Festival in the Teatro Rossini, Pesaro, 8 August 2004)	Audio CD: Decca; Cat: 475 7688
2012	Olga Peretyatko, Anna Goryachova, Chiara Chialli, Juan Diego Flórez	Michele Mariotti, Orchestra and Choir of Teatro Comunale di Bologna (Video recording of a performance (or of performances) at the Rossini Opera Festival, Pesaro, August 2012)	DVD: Decca Classics; Cat: 074 3813
2020	Sarah Blanch, Victoria Yarovaya, Lamia Beuque, Michele Angelini	José Miguel Pérez-Sierra Passionart Orchestra, Gorecki Chamber Choir	Audio CD: NAXOS Cat: 8660492-94
