= L'equivoco stravagante =

1811 opera by Gioachino Rossini

- Dramma giocoso by Gioachino Rossini
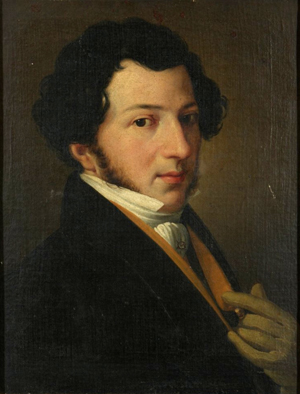
- Rossini c. 1815
- Librettist: Gaetano Gasbarri
- Language: Italian
- Premiere: 26 October 1811; Teatro del Corso, Bologna

L'equivoco stravagante (Italian pronunciation: [leˈkwiːvoko stravaˈɡante]; The Curious Misunderstanding) is an operatic dramma giocoso in two acts by Gioachino Rossini to an Italian libretto by Gaetano Gasbarri. It was Rossini's first attempt at writing a full two-act opera.

== Performance history ==
L'equivoco stravagante was first performed at the Teatro del Corso, Bologna, on 26 October 1811. It was only performed three times before the police closed the production down, possibly because the text touched on the subject of army desertion. The music of the overture was subsequently lost.

Wexford Festival Opera presented the opera first in 1968 and a revival in 2026 which was broadcast on OperaVision. The opera was first produced in the United States (in English translation as The Bizarre Deception) by the Bronx Opera in January 2004.

== Roles ==
Roles, voice types, premiere cast
Role	Voice type	Premiere cast, 26 October 1811 Conductor: Giuseppe Boschetti
Gamberotto, a rich farmer	bass	Domenico Vaccani
Ernestina, literature-loving daughter of Gamberotto	contralto	Marietta Marcolini
Buralicchio, wealthy young man, promised to Ernestina	bass	Paolo Rosich
Ermanno, poor young man, in love with Ernestina	tenor	Tommaso Berti
Rosalia, Ernestina's maid	soprano	Angiola Chies
Frontino, Gamberotto's servant and confidant of Ermanno	tenor	Giuseppe Spirito

== Synopsis ==
Place: Italy
Time: Early 19th century

Ermanno loves Ernestina, who is attracted to the rich, but foolish, Buralicchio. Ermanno's scheming results in Ernestina being arrested on suspicion of having deserted from the army (and really being a man in disguise), but he rescues her, and all ends happily.

== Recordings ==
Year	Roles: Gamberotto, Ernestina, Buralicchio, Ermanno	Conductor, opera house and orchestra	Label
1974	Sesto Bruscantini, Margherita Guglielmi, Rolando Panerai, Giuseppe Baratti	Bruno Rigacci, Orchestra of RAI, Naples (Recording of a performance broadcast on 8 January 1974)	Audio CD: Bongiovanni "The Golden Age of Opera" series, Cat: GOA 154-155
2001	Marco di Felice, Petia Petrova, Marco Vinco, Vito Martino	Alberto Zedda, Czech Chamber Soloists and Chorus	Audio CD: Naxos Opera Classics; Cat: 8.660087-88
2001	Olga Voznessenskaia, Silvia Vajente, Carlo Morini, Luciano Miotto, Vito Martino, Daniele Maniscalchi	Carmine Carrisi; Orchestra del Conservatorio di Musica G. B. Martini, Bologna (Recorded October 2001)	KICCO Classic - KC081.2
2008	Bruno de Simone, Marina Prudenskaja, Marco Vinco, Dmitry Korchak	Umbero Benedetti Michelangeli, Orchestra Haydn di Bolzano e Trento (Recorded at the Rossini Opera Festival)	DVD: Dynamic; Cat: 33610
