= Michele Mariotti =

Italian conductor (born 1979)

Michele Mariotti (born in 1979) is an Italian conductor. Since 2014, he has been the direttore musicale of Teatro Comunale di Bologna. A graduate in composition of Pesaro's Conservatorio Rossini, where he also studied orchestral conducting, he made his professional opera debut with Il barbiere di Siviglia in Salerno on 12 October 2005. As of April 2017, his repertory included nine Rossini and eight Verdi operas, an extraordinary achievement, as well as symphonies of Beethoven, Bruckner and Schubert, the Rossini Stabat mater, the Mozart Requiem and the Verdi Requiem.

== Early life and early work ==
Mariotti was born in 1979 in Urbino. Between 2006 and 2008, following the Rossini opera in Salerno, Mariotti conducted opera in Florence (Zaninelli's Snow White in its Italian premiere); in Fano (Gianni Schicchi); at the Wexford Festival (Donizetti's rare Don Gregorio); in Bologna; at the Teatro Comunale di Ferrara (L'italiana in Algeri); at the Teatro Regio di Torino; in Lima (Rigoletto with Peruvian tenor Juan Diego Flórez); at the Teatro Principal de Mahón on Menorca (I puritani); at the Teatro Municipale (Valli) in Reggio Emilia (Nabucco for the 2008 Festival Verdi); and in Liège. He also gave concerts with various orchestras in Italy and abroad during this launch period.

== Career ==
=== In Bologna ===
The success of a November 2007 filmed run of Simon Boccanegra at the Teatro Comunale di Bologna, opening the season there, led to Mariotti's appointment as the theatre's direttore principale, to start the next year, a title he would hold until his promotion in 2014. He replaced Daniele Gatti and effectively embarked upon a major career.

Productions in Bologna conducted by Mariotti in his capacities as direttore principale and then direttore musicale have been: I puritani with Flórez and La gazza ladra in 2009; Idomeneo with Francesco Meli, Carmen and La traviata (2010); La Cenerentola with Laura Polverelli, Ferrero's Risorgimento! and Dallapiccola's Il prigioniero (2011); Le nozze di Figaro (2012); Norma with Mariella Devia and Nabucco (2013); Così fan tutte and, Michael Spyres and Carlos Álvarez, Guillaume Tell in 2014; Die Zauberflöte, the conductor's first German-language project, and, with Gregory Kunde, Un ballo in maschera (2015); Attila with Ildebrando d’Arcangelo, filmed by RAI TV, and Werther with Flórez (2016); and in 2017 La voix humaine with Anna Caterina Antonacci and Cavalleria rusticana.

Mariotti's duties in Bologna include regular subscription concerts with the Orchestra del Teatro Comunale di Bologna, in its home theatre and at the Teatro Auditorium Manzoni, the base of Orchestra Mozart. Beethoven's symphonies have featured prominently in these concerts.

=== In Pesaro ===
For thirty years, until early 2017, the opera company in Bologna anchored the Rossini Opera Festival in Pesaro. Accordingly, Mariotti participated in his home town's most visible summer event. Among his projects for the ROF with the Chorus and Orchestra of the Teatro Comunale di Bologna were three filmed operas: a 2010 Sigismondo, a 2012 Matilde di Shabran and a 2013 Guillaume Tell, the first two featuring his future wife, Olga Peretyatko, the latter two starring Flórez. He also conducted the Bologna forces in the Adriatic resort in Rossini's Stabat mater.

=== In Munich ===
The conductor has developed a bond with the Münchner Symphoniker, guest-conducting the German ensemble in 2013, 2015 and 2017 in works by Schubert, Mendelssohn and Bruckner, among others. In the same city, in 2017, he debuted at Bavarian State Opera with Semiramide starring Joyce DiDonato.

=== In the United States ===
Mariotti made his U.S. debut on 12 September 2009, conducting Il barbiere di Siviglia at Washington National Opera. Two months later he performed the same opera in a different production and with a different cast (including Flórez and DiDonato) at Los Angeles Opera. In 2012 he led Carmen at the Metropolitan Opera and he has since returned to conduct four other productions with that company, making DVDs of Rigoletto for Deutsche Grammophon and La donna del lago for Erato. He debuted with the Oregon Symphony Orchestra in Portland the same year (2012) and performed Rossini at Lyric Opera of Chicago two years later.

=== In Japan ===
During the Bologna company's September 2011 tour to Japan, Mariotti led performances of Carmen, starring Nino Surguladze, and I puritani, with Desirée Rancatore, Celso Albelo, Luca Salsi and Nicola Ulivieri, at Tokyo Bunka Kaikan, as well as events outside the capital.

=== Elsewhere ===
Mariotti conducted Don Pasquale at the Teatro Regio di Torino in 2009, Il barbiere di Siviglia at the Teatro alla Scala in Milan in 2010, and, for his first performances in Spain, in 2011, L'italiana in Algeri at Bilbao's Palacio Euskalduna. Elsewhere in Europe, he has led opera at the Teatro di San Carlo in Naples, the Teatro Alighieri in Ravenna, the Teatro Massimo in Palermo, the Teatro Comunale in Florence, the Teatro Verdi in Busseto (Il trovatore in concert in 2011), and at the Sferisterio di Macerata. In 2013 he conducted La donna del lago at the Royal Opera House in London and I puritani at the Opéra Bastille in Paris.

In the area of symphonic music, he has guest-conducted the Leipzig Gewandhaus Orchestra, the Orchestre National de France, the Orchestra Sinfonica Nazionale della RAI in Turin, and the house orchestra of the Teatro Real in Madrid. He has also led concerts at the Théâtre des Champs-Elysées in Paris and the Festival de Radio France in Montpellier.

=== Recent projects ===
In 2016, Mariotti added I due Foscari to his repertory, conducting it as a return engagement at the Teatro alla Scala. Later the same year, he led his first performances of two French operas, both featuring Flórez: Les Huguenots at the Deutsche Oper in Berlin and the above-mentioned Werther in Bologna.

== Personal life ==
Mariotti married Russian soprano Olga Peretyatko in Pesaro in August 2012, just after a run of Rossini's Matilde di Shabran, o sia Bellezza e Cuor di ferro (Beauty and Ironheart) in which they both participated. She was born in Leningrad in 1980. They live in the Pesaro area, as do Flórez and his wife. The four are close friends; the men were introduced by retired Peruvian tenor Ernesto Palacio, a mentor to Flórez, longtime Pesaro area resident, former artist manager for both the younger tenor and the conductor, and, as of 2018, superintendent of the Rossini Opera Festival.
