= L'italiana in Algeri =

Opera by Gioachino Rossini

- Dramma giocoso by Gioachino Rossini
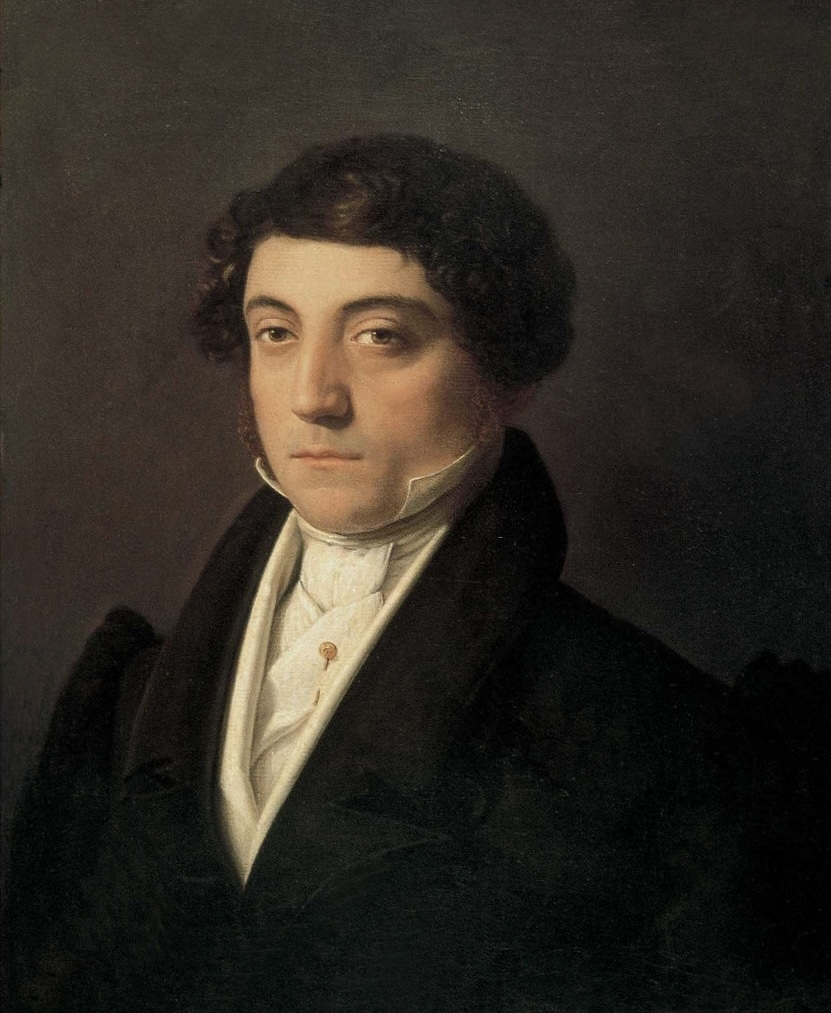
- Portrait of the composer
- Translation: The Italian Girl in Algiers
- Librettist: Angelo Anelli
- Language: Italian
- Premiere: 22 May 1813; Teatro San Benedetto, Venice

L'italiana in Algeri (Italian pronunciation: [litaˈljaːna in alˈdʒɛːri]; The Italian Girl in Algiers) is an operatic dramma giocoso in two acts by Gioachino Rossini to an Italian libretto by Angelo Anelli, based on his earlier text set by Luigi Mosca. It premiered at the Teatro San Benedetto in Venice on 22 May 1813. The music is characteristic of Rossini's style, remarkable for its fusion of sustained, manic energy with elegant, pristine melodies.

== Composition history ==
Rossini wrote L'italiana in Algeri when he was 21. Rossini stated that he composed the opera in 18 days, though other sources claim that it took him 27 days. Rossini entrusted the composition of the recitatives as well as the aria "Le femmine d'Italia" to an unknown collaborator. The opera is notable for Rossini's mixing of opera seria style with opera buffa. The overture is widely recorded and performed today, known for its distinct opening of slow, quiet pizzicato basses, leading to a sudden loud burst of sound from the full orchestra. This "surprise" reflects Rossini's early admiration for Joseph Haydn, whose Symphony No. 94 in G major, "The Surprise Symphony", is so named for the same shocking and semi-comic effect.

== Performance history ==
The work was first performed at the Teatro San Benedetto, Venice on 22 May 1813. It was a notable success and Rossini made progressive changes to the work for later performances in Vicenza, Milan and Naples, during the following two years.

The opera was first presented in London at His Majesty's Theatre on 28 January 1819, Buenos Aires at the Teatro Coliseo on 30 June 1826, and on 5 November 1832 in New York. It fell somewhat out of favour as the 19th century progressed, but notable performances were presented from the 1920s in "Turin (1925), Rome (1927) and London (1935)" and it has been revived frequently since World War II with many successful productions. In the 21st century, Rossini’s opera continues to be performed regularly.

== Roles ==
Roles, voice types, premier cast
Role	Voice type	Premiere cast, 22 May 1813 Conductor: likely Alessandro Rolla
Isabella, the Italian girl	contralto	Marietta Marcolini
Lindoro, in love with Isabella	tenor	Serafino Gentili
Taddeo, an elderly Italian	bass	Paolo Rosich
Mustafà, the Bey of Algiers	bass	Filippo Galli
Elvira, his wife	soprano	Luttgard Annibaldi
Zulma, her confidante	mezzo-soprano	Annunziata Berni Chelli
Haly, the captain of the Bey's guard	tenor or bass	Giuseppe Spirito
Harem women (silent); Eunuchs, pirates, slaves, sailors – Male chorus

== Synopsis ==
Place: Algiers
Time: The past

=== Act 1 ===
The palace of the Bey of Algiers

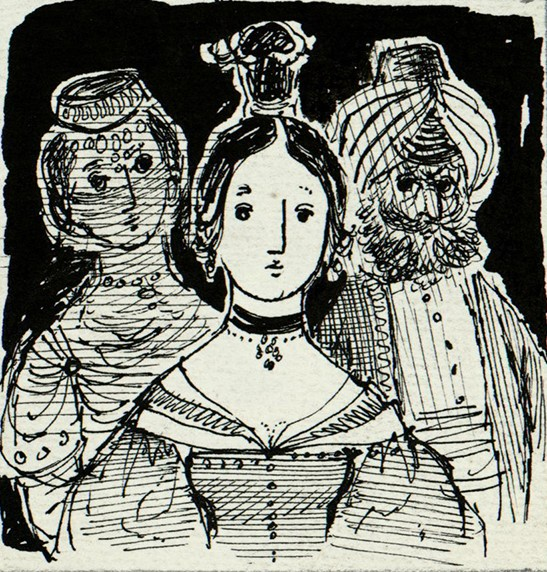
Design for the libretto cover

Elvira accompanied by her slave Zulma regrets the loss of the love of her husband, the Turkish Bey Mustafà. Left alone with Haly (since the Italian 'h' is silent, this corresponds to the name Ali, more familiar in the English-speaking world), Captain of the Corsairs, Mustafà reveals his plan to marry Elvira off to Lindoro, his Italian slave. The Bey is bored with his submissive harem, desiring a new challenge to his virility: he wants an Italian girl, and Haly must find one! Lindoro enters alone and sings about Isabella, his true love (Languir per una bella). Mustafà comes in to explain Lindoro's impending marriage. The enthusiastic Bey describes the attractions of the match, while Lindoro struggles to refuse (Se inclinassi a prender moglie).

The seashore

A ship has been wrecked in a storm. Its passengers include Isabella, in search of Lindoro, and Taddeo, her travelling companion and would-be lover. Isabella enters with a sorrowful cavatina Cruda sorte! Amor tiranno!, however she is not afraid (Già so per pratica) and will master the situation. Haly and his men take them prisoner. She passes off Taddeo as her uncle. Haly is delighted to learn she is an Italian – exactly what the Bey wanted! Left to consider their fate, Isabella is irritated by Taddeo's jealousy of Lindoro (Ai capricci della sorte), but they resolve to join forces.

The palace

Back in the palace, Lindoro and Elvira do not wish to marry, but Mustafà offers Lindoro passage on a ship returning to Italy if he takes Elvira. Lindoro agrees, admitting a vague possibility of marrying her in Italy. Haly enters with news of the arrival of the Italian beauty. Mustafà is elated (Già d'insolito ardore nel petto agitare).

Surrounded by eunuchs (Viva, viva il flagel delle donne), Mustafà receives Isabella in a grand hall. He is enchanted, though she is rather amused by his appearance (Oh! Che muso, che figura!). At that moment, Lindoro, Elvira and Zulma arrive to say goodbye to Mustafà (Pria di dividerci da voi, Signore). Lindoro and Isabella are astonished to come face to face. Recovering herself, Isabella asks about Elvira, learning she is Mustafà's ex-wife, who is being sent away to Italy, where she is to marry Lindoro. Isabella demands that Mustafà allow Elvira (and therefore Lindoro) to remain in Algiers, telling Mustafà that he does not know how to love (Voi non sapete amar). Mustafà capitulates to Isabella's insistence. The act ends with an ensemble of confusion (Confusi e stupidi).

=== Act 2 ===
In the palace

Elvira and Zulma note Isabella's skill with men. Mustafà reveals his strategy for seducing Isabella: he installs Lindoro as Isabella's servant and his informer, and Taddeo will also be induced to help. Elvira and Zulma must tell Isabella he is coming to take coffee with her.

Isabella and Lindoro are alone. He explains that he had no intention of marrying Elvira. They agree to escape together and Lindoro sings of his happiness (Ah come il cor di giubilo). Mustafà enters with a reluctant Taddeo, acclaimed by the Turks as "Lord Kaimakan" (Viva il grande Kaimakan). He dislikes interceding with Isabella for the Bey, but is frightened to refuse (Ho un gran peso sulla testa).

In her apartment

Isabella is dressing in Turkish style. Zulma and Elvira deliver Mustafà's message: he is coming for coffee. Isabella orders three cups. Elvira should wait in a side room. As Mustafà approaches, Isabella sings a romantic cavatina, Per lui che adoro – she will receive him. Mustafà tells Taddeo to leave when he sneezes (Ti presento di mia man). Isabella greets Mustafà warmly and he sneezes, but Taddeo ignores the signal. Isabella calls for coffee and then – to Mustafà's horror and amazement – invites Elvira to join them.

Elsewhere in the palace

Haly sings in praise of the women of Italy (Le femmine d'Italia). The Italians enter, and Taddeo reveals to a surprised Lindoro that he is not her uncle but her lover (he himself is unaware of the other man's true identity). Lindoro tells Mustafà that Isabella will declare him her adored pappataci ("sandfly," literally "silent eater": a man unable to resist the opposite sex). This, as Lindoro explains (Pappataci! Che mai sento!), is an Italian custom and a great honour, as the pappataci enjoy an idyllic life dedicated to eating, drinking and sleeping. Zulma and Haly speculate about Isabella's real intentions and the quantity of alcohol ordered for the ceremony.

Isabella's apartment

She addresses the Italian slaves who will be pappataci in the ceremony – she will lead them to freedom (Pensa alla patria). The ceremony begins (Dei pappataci s'avanza il coro); Mustafà is delighted with his new honour and changes into appropriate costume. Isabella explains his obligations. He must swear an oath of eating, drinking, and keeping silent, repeating the words after Taddeo. Following that his oath is tested, under provocation by Isabella and Lindoro.

A European ship docks near the palace, signaling the moment to escape. Taddeo finally realizes Lindoro’s true identity but chooses to go along with the plan regardless. Elvira, Zulma, and Haly discover that the Bey is still behaving like a confused "pappataci." Regaining his senses, Mustafà attempts to summon his troops, only to find them all drunk. The Italians make their escape, while Mustafà pleads for Elvira's forgiveness, vowing to avoid Italian women in the future.

== Recordings ==
Year	Cast: Isabella, Lindoro, Mustafa, Taddeo	Conductor, Opera house and orchestra	Label
1954	Giulietta Simionato, Cesare Valletti, Mario Petri, Marcello Cortis	Carlo Maria Giulini; La Scala orchestra and chorus	CD: EMI; Cat: CHS 7 64041-2
1963	Teresa Berganza, Luigi Alva, Fernando Corena, Rolando Panerai	Silvio Varviso, Maggio Musicale Fiorentino	CD: Decca; Cat: 475 8285
1978	Lucia Valentini Terrani, Ugo Benelli, Sesto Bruscantini, Enzo Dara	Gary Bertini, Staatskapelle Dresden	CD: Arts Music; Cat: 43048-2
1979	Lucia Valentini Terrani, Francisco Araiza, Wladimiro Ganzarolli, Enzo Dara	Gabriele Ferro, Cappella Coloniensis	CD: CBS; Cat: M3T 39048
1980	Marilyn Horne, Ernesto Palacio, Samuel Ramey, Domenico Trimarchi	Claudio Scimone, I Solisti Veneti	CD: Erato; Cat: 2292-45404-2
1986	Marilyn Horne, Douglas Ahlstedt, Paolo Montarsolo, Allan Monk	James Levine, Metropolitan Opera Orchestra and Chorus	DVD: Deutsche Grammophon; Cat: 00440 073 4261
1987	Agnes Baltsa, Frank Lopardo, Ruggero Raimondi, Enzo Dara	Claudio Abbado, Vienna Philharmonic	CD: Deutsche Grammophon; Cat: 427 331-2
1987	Doris Soffel, Robert Gambill, Günter von Kannen, Enric Serra	Ralf Weikert, Stuttgart Radio Symphony Orchestra, Bulgarian Male Chorus, Sofia	DVD: ArtHaus Musik; Cat: 100 120
1998	Jennifer Larmore, Raúl Giménez, John Del Carlo; Alessandro Corbelli	Jesús López Cobos, Lausanne Chamber Orchestra	CD: Erato; Cat: 0630 17130-2
2006	Marianna Pizzolato, Marco Vinco, Maxim Mironov; Bruno De Simone	Donato Renzetti, Orchestra Teatro Comunale di Bologna	DVD: Dynamic; Cat: 33526
2008	Marianna Pizzolato, Lorenzo Regazzo, Lawrence Brownlee; Bruno De Simone; Giulio Mastrototaro,	Alberto Zedda, Virtuosi Brunensis Orchestra and the Philharmonischer Chor Transilvania Cluj (Recording of a performance at the Rossini in Wildbad Festival, 5 July)	CD: Naxos; Cat: 8.660284-85
2019	Cecilia Bartoli, Edgardo Rocha, Ildar Abdrazakov, Alessandro Corbelli	Jean-Christophe Spinosi, Ensemble Matheus, Moshe Leiser, stage director	DVD:Unitel Editions; Cat:801808
