= Rinaldo discography =

This is a discography of George Frideric Handel's opera Rinaldo, which premiered on 24 February 1711 at the Queen's Theatre in London.

Year	Cast (Rinaldo, Almirena, Armida, Goffredo, Argante)	Conductor, Opera House and/or Orchestra	Notes	Label
1977	Carolyn Watkinson, Ileana Cotrubaș, Jeanette Scovotti, Paul Esswood, Ulrik Cold	Jean-Claude Malgoire, La Grande Écurie et la Chambre du Roy		Sony Music Entertainment
1989	Marilyn Horne, Cecilia Gasdia, Christine Weidinger, Ernesto Palacio, Natale de Carolis	John Fisher, Orchestra of La Fenice	Live recording from June 1989 which was first released in 1992 and re-issued in 2009	Nuova Era
1999	David Daniels, Cecilia Bartoli, Ľuba Orgonášová, Bernarda Fink, Gerald Finley	Christopher Hogwood, Academy of Ancient Music	Recording venue: Henry Wood Hall, London; 2001 Gramophone "Editor's Choice" award.	Decca Records
2001	Vivica Genaux, Miah Persson, Inga Kalna, Lawrence Zazzo, James Rutherford	René Jacobs, Freiburg Baroque Orchestra	Winner of the Cannes Classical Award, 2004	Harmonia Mundi
2005	Kimberly Barber, Laura Whalen, Barbara Hannigan, Marion Newman, Sean Watson	Kevin Mallon, Aradia Ensemble		Naxos Records

== Video recordings ==
Year	Cast: (Rinaldo, Almirena, Armida, Goffredo, Argante), Eustazio	Conductor, orchestra	Stage director	Label
2001	David Daniels, Deborah York, Noëmi Nadelmann, David Walker, Egils Silins, Axel Köhler,	Harry Bicket; Bavarian State Opera Orchestra	David Alden	DVD:Arthaus Musik; Cat:100389
2011	Sonia Prina, Anett Fritsch, Brenda Rae, Varduhi Abrahamyan, Luca Pisaroni, Tim Mead	Ottavio Dantone, Orchestra of the Age of Enlightenment	Robert Carsen (Glyndebourne Festival Opera)	DVD:Opus Arte Glyndebourne; Cat:OA1081D
2021	Raffaele Pe, Francesca Aspromonte, Carmela Remigio, Leonardo Cortellazzi, Andrea Patucelli, (unperformed)	Federico Maria Sardelli, Orchestra del Maggio Musicale Fiorentino	Pier Luigi Pizzi	DVD:Dynamic; Cat:37896
