= Margarita Zimmermann =

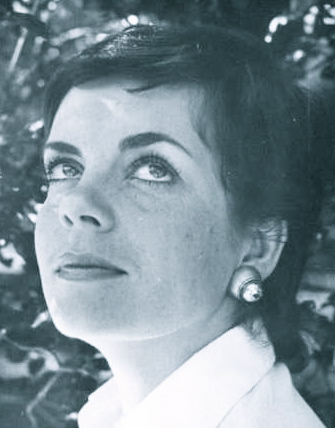
Margarita Zimmermann

Margarita Zimmermann (born October 3, 1942) is an Argentine mezzo-soprano, particularly associated with the Italian and French repertories.

== Life and career ==
Born in Hurlingham, Buenos Aires Province, Argentina, she made her debut as a recitalist at the Teatro Colón of her native city. She then left for Europe, where she studied notably with Gérard Souzay.

She made her European debut at La Monnaie in Brussels, as Cherubino in Le nozze di Figaro, in 1977. During the same season, she sang Idamante in Idomeneo, at the Opéra de Lyon.

In 1981, she settled in Venice, and appeared regularly at La Fenice, notably in Handel's Agrippina, and in Gluck's Orfeo ed Euridice, while pursuing an international career, appearing at the Paris Opéra, the Aix-en-Provence Festival, the Royal Opera House in London, San Francisco, Philadelphia, etc.

Her roles included, Berlioz's Didon, Carmen, Charlotte, Dulcinée, as well as Rossini roles, such as Isabella, Rosina, and most notably Calbo in Maometto II, which she recorded opposite Samuel Ramey, June Anderson, and Ernesto Palacio, under Claudio Scimone.

She also appeared often in oratorio, and in recital of mélodie.

== Sources ==
- Dictionnaire des interprètes, Alain Pâris, (Éditions Robert Laffont, 1989). ISBN 2-221-06660-X
