= Christine Weidinger =

American operatic soprano (1946–2024)

Christine Weidinger (March 31, 1946 – August 24, 2024) was an American operatic soprano who has had an active international career in operas and concerts since the early 1970s. Her career started at the Metropolitan Opera, after which she was active as a resident artist with opera houses in Germany during the late 1970s and 1980s. From the 1970s through the 1990s she worked as a guest artist with many leading opera houses throughout Europe, South America, and the United States.

== Life and career ==
Born in Springville, New York, Weidinger grew up in New York and Arizona. She studied singing with Marlene Delavan at Grand Canyon University, Richard Dales at Arizona State University, David Scott at San Fernando Valley State College, and Margaret Harshaw at the Jacobs School of Music at Indiana University. In April 1972 she won the national first prize in the Metropolitan Opera National Council Auditions with a contract at the Met and the enthusiastic endorsement of the incoming General Manager Göran Gentele, who announced to the "New York Times" that Weidinger would be his first "home-grown" star. This was followed just a few months later by her professional opera debut as Cherubino in Wolfgang Amadeus Mozart's The Marriage of Figaro at the Central City Opera in Colorado.

On November 24, 1972 Weidinger made her debut at the Metropolitan Opera House as Ortlinde in Richard Wagner's Die Walküre with conductor Erich Leinsdorf, Birgit Nilsson as Brünnhilde, Jon Vickers as Siegmund, and Gwyneth Jones as Sieglinde. This performance was a jump-in. She had been scheduled to debut as Musetta in "La Boheme", which she finally sang a few days later. She performed regularly at the Met through the Spring of 1976 where she was heard as Elvira in Gioachino Rossini's L'italiana in Algeri, Frasquita in Georges Bizet's Carmen, Gianetta in Gaetano Donizetti's L'elisir d'amore, the High Priestess in Giuseppe Verdi's Aida, Naiad in Richard Strauss' Ariadne auf Naxos, Stéphano in Charles Gounod's Roméo et Juliette, Woglinde in Wagner's The Ring Cycle, Gretel in Engelbert Humperdinck's Hänsel und Gretel, Marzelline in Ludwig van Beethoven's Fidelio, and, of course, Musetta in Giacomo Puccini's La bohème.

Following the advice of her mentor Marilyn Horne, Weidinger left the Met after four years and became a resident artist at the Staatsoper Stuttgart (1976–1980). After four years in Stuttgart, she chose to join the Bielefeld Opera (1981–1989) where she was first introduced into the belcanto repertoire. All productions of this literature were performed in Italian. From this small German house she attracted international attention in such roles as Lucia di Lammermoor, Elisabetta in "Roberto Devereux", Norma, Amina in "La sonnambula" and Violetta in "La traviata". She went on to appear as a guest artist at major opera houses and festivals internationally, including the Aix-en-Provence Festival, the Bavarian State Opera, the Deutsche Oper Berlin, the Hamburg State Opera, La Fenice, La Scala, the Liceu, the Los Angeles Opera, the Municipal Theatre of Santiago, the Opéra de Monte-Carlo, the Salzburg Festival, the Vienna State Opera, and the Welsh National Opera among others. In 1988 she performed the role of Eupaforice in Carl Heinrich Graun's Montezuma at the Spoleto Festival USA. After a 16-year absence, she returned to the Metropolitan Opera in 1992 to sing the title role in Rossini's Semiramide.

Some of the many other roles Weidinger has sung on stage are Arminda in La finta giardiniera, the Countess in Le comte Ory, Gilda in Rigoletto, Konstanze in The Abduction from the Seraglio, Leonora in Il trovatore, the title role in Rossini's "Armida", Armida in Handel's "Rinaldo" (with Marilyn Horne) and Amenaide in "Tancredi". She also performed the demanding Donizetti "Queen roles" at the Liceu with Richard Bonynge conducting and Giancarlo Del Monaco directing. She married North Carolina native and opera director Kenneth Smith, who was then performance house manager at the Metropolitan Opera, in 1976. They resided in Durham, North Carolina, where Weidinger headed the "Triangle Opera Studios", an organization designed to provide performance opportunities for advanced voice students in a professional setting to prepare them for professional engagements.

== Recordings ==
Year	Work	Cast	Conductor, Opera House and/or Orchestra	Notes	Label
1977	L'Africaine; Giacomo Meyerbeer	Montserrat Caballé, Christine Weidinger, Plácido Domingo	Antonio de Almeida, Gran Teatre del Liceu Orchestra and Chorus		Legato Classics
1989	Rinaldo; George Frideric Handel	Marilyn Horne, Cecilia Gasdia, Christine Weidinger, Ernesto Palacio, Natale de Carolis	John Fisher, Orchestra of La Fenice	Live recording from June 1989 which was first released in 1992 and re-issued in 2009	Nuova Era
1996	Demetrio e Polibio; Gioacchino Rossini	Giorgio Surjan, Christine Weidinger, Dalmau González	Massimiliano Carraro, Grazer Philharmonisches Orchester, Bratislava Chamber Choir		
