= Nancy Underhill =

American art historian

Professor Nancy Underhill
- Born: Nancy Dudley Hoffman; 1938 (age 87–88); New York City
- Occupations: Art Historian and Curator
- Spouse: Peter Francis Underhill (m. 1962; died 2013)
- Children: 2

Academic background
- Education: Bryn Mawr College

Academic work
- Discipline: Art History

Professor Nancy Underhill (born 1938) is an art historian, curator, lecturer and author. She is the Founder of the University of Queensland Department of Art History.

== Biography ==
Nancy Dudley Hoffman was born in New York City in 1938 to parents Kenneth L. Hoffman and Ruth Walker Hoffman. In 1962 she married Peter Francis Underhill (died 2013) in London. They have two sons.

Underhill's higher education included attendance at Bryn Mawr College, Pennsylvania, where she attained a Bachelor of Arts degree in 1960. Following this she was awarded a Fulbright Scholarship and studied at the Courtauld Institute of Art, University of London, attaining a Master of Philosophy degree in 1962, the subject of which was Romanesque Churches in Oxfordshire. For her doctoral thesis on Australian Art Patronage between 1916 and 1950 she was awarded a PhD by the University of Melbourne.

== Academic career ==
=== Australia beckons ===
Underhill arrived in Australia in 1963 to work as a lecturer and tutor in the Department of History at the University of Queensland. Her presence was immediately felt in Brisbane by those interested in art and art education. In 1964 she had arranged a talk at the university on the rebuilding of Coventry Cathedral, which had been extensively damaged in World War 2. The talk included film of the cathedral and discussion of the works of Graham Sutherland, Jacob Epstein and John Piper.

During the 1960s Underhill contributed art criticism to magazines including The Bulletin, and in 1965 she was elected as editor of the broadsheet of the Queensland Branch of the Contemporary Art Society of Australia, through which she encouraged debate about art and art history. In her Masters thesis submitted in 1989 the author, Helen Fridemanis, asserts that Underhill was not afraid to challenge critics who suggested that Brisbane was on the "periphery of culture" in the 1960s.

=== Academic life ===
Underhill became the Foundation Head of the Department of Art History and first Director of the Art Museum University of Queensland. The Art Museum continues to feature in the cultural life of students and the general public with regular exhibitions.

Underhill established the first full year course on Australian Art. She initiated the first course on curatorial training and practice for undergraduates and established the Visiting Scholar Scheme that brought distinguished scholars to teach for a term at the university.

She coordinated 'Eureka!, 1982 Artists from Australia' exhibition, and assembled the catalogue of the exhibition. The exhibition was held from March–April 1982 at The Serpentine Gallery and the Institute of Contemporary Arts in London.

In 2014 her involvement as curator culminated in the exhibition Remembering Brian and Marjorie Johnstone's Galleries. It ran from the end of May to mid August 2014. She also wrote the catalogue for the exhibition.

=== Membership of committees and boards ===
Underhill's membership of various boards and committees include having served on the Visual Arts Board of the Australia Council; chaired the Art Association of Australia and the Museums Association of Australia and served on the board of Heide Museum of Modern Art in Bullen, a suburb of Melbourne, Victoria. She has been a Visiting Fellow at the Humanities Research Centre at Australian National University, Canberra, and the Centre of Australian Studies, King's College London.

Her interest in opera is evidenced by her appointment as Deputy to Lisa Gasteen, AO, at the Lisa Gasteen National Opera School.

=== Photography ===
There is another connection that Underhill has to the Courtauld Institute. Photographs attributed to her appear in the Conway Library Collection. The collection includes film and glass negatives as well as prints. It consists mostly of architectural images and also holds the collections of Paul Laib and Anthony Kersting. Currently the collection is being digitised as part of the wider Courtauld Connects project.

== Awards ==
In 2013 Underhill was awarded an Honorary Doctorate from Griffith University for "her achievement and service within the Australian and international visual arts community."

In 2017 she was appointed Honorary Professor at the University of Queensland.

== Publications ==
=== Books ===
Underhill, Nancy (1992) Making Australian Art 1916-46: Sidney Ure Smith - Patron and Publisher, Oxford University Press, Australia. British Library General Reference Collection YC. 1993.b.1461

Reid, Barrett and Underhill, Nancy (2001) Letters of John Reid: Defining Australian Cultural Life 1920-1981, Harmondsworth, Penguin. British Library General Reference Collection YA.2002.a.27205

Underhill, Nancy (2007) Nolan on Nolan, London, Viking, London. British Library General Reference Collection YC.2009.a.3973

Underhill, Nancy and Martin-Chew, Louise (2014) Remembering Brian and Marjorie Johnston's Galleries, Brisbane, University of Queensland

Underhill, Nancy (2015) Sidney Nolan: A Life. Sydney NSW, NewSouth. British Library General Reference Collection YK.2016.a.1881

=== Journal articles ===
Underhill, Nancy D., Figaro as Seinfeld: The 19th Century Sitcom, Opera News May, 1999, 1

Underhill, Nancy D., La Dame aux Camelias, To La Traviata, Opera News, 9 (2), 1999, 1-1

Underhill, Nancy D., Peter Kennedy: Breaking Down the Barriers, Art and Australia, Vol. 38 (1), 2000, 98-104

Fennessy, Kathleen, Taylor Alex; Stephen, Ann; McNamara, Philip; Goad, Andrew; Carter Nannette; Smith, Bernard; Hoorn, Janet and Underhill, Nancy, Sweeping Across Art History from Australia. Art History, Vol. 32, No. 3, 2009, 608–618, Oxford, Blackwell Publishing. British Library Shelfmark 1733.447000
