= John Fisher (opera director) =

John Fisher (born 29 July) is a Scottish conductor, opera manager, vocal coach, and record producer. The former Artistic Administrator of La Scala in Milan, he served as the Chief Executive and Artistic Director of the Welsh National Opera (WNO) from 2006 until 2011. He has worked as a record producer of opera recordings for both Deutsche Grammophon and Decca Records, and collaborated with opera director Jean-Pierre Ponnelle on several opera films for Unitel Films.

== Life and career ==
In 1977 Fisher was appointed the Head of Music Staff at La Scala in Milan. From 1981-1988 be served as La Scala's Artistic Administrator, and from 1983–1988 he worked as music administrator for the Rossini Opera Festival in Pesaro. In 1989 he became the first non-Italian to serve as Artistic Director of Teatro La Fenice in Venice. He left that post in 1994 to become Executive Producer and Director of Opera and Vocal Productions at Deutsche Grammophon. He remained in that post until 1997 when he was hired by the Metropolitan Opera of New York City as the company's Director of Music Administration, a position he remained in until becoming General Director of Welsh National Opera in 2006.

Fisher served as jury chairman (operatic and song categories) of the prestigious 'BBC Cardiff Singer of the World' competition in 2007, 2009 and 2011. In 2011, 2012, 2013 and 2014 he served as an international guest coach on the faculty of the inaugural Lisa Gasteen Opera Summer School in Australia. In 2012 he was invited back to the Met in NY to prepare the casts in a new production qof Wagner's Ring Cycle, working with - amongst others - acclaimed stars Bryn Terfel and Deborah Voigt. He is in demand throughout the world as an operatic vocal coach of the highest calibre, appearing at such institutions as the Juilliard School and the Young Artists Program at the Met.

On 5 July 2013, John Fisher was invested with an Honorary Fellowship of the Royal Welsh College of Music and Drama. On 24 August 2014, he conducted the Kaunas City Symphony Orchestra and State Choir in a performance of the Verdi Requiem for the closing concert of the Pažaislis Music Festival 2014 (Kaunas, Lithuania), commemorating the 70th anniversary of the liquidation of the Jewish ghetto in Kaunas.

In June, 2015, Fisher was a member of the jury for the 15th Tchaikovsky International Competition (Voice Category) in Moscow and St. Petersburg.

In September, 2015, Fisher returned to the Met as its Director of Music Administration and in 2016 became Assistant General Manager of Music Administration.

== Recordings ==
Year	Work	Cast	Conductor, Opera House and/or Orchestra	Notes	Label
1989	Rinaldo; George Frideric Handel	Marilyn Horne, Cecilia Gasdia, Christine Weidinger, Ernesto Palacio, Natale de Carolis	John Fisher, Orchestra of La Fenice	Live recording from June 1989 which was first released in 1992 and re-issued in 2009	Nuova Era
