= Maometto II =

Opera by Gioachino Rossini

- Opera by Gioachino Rossini
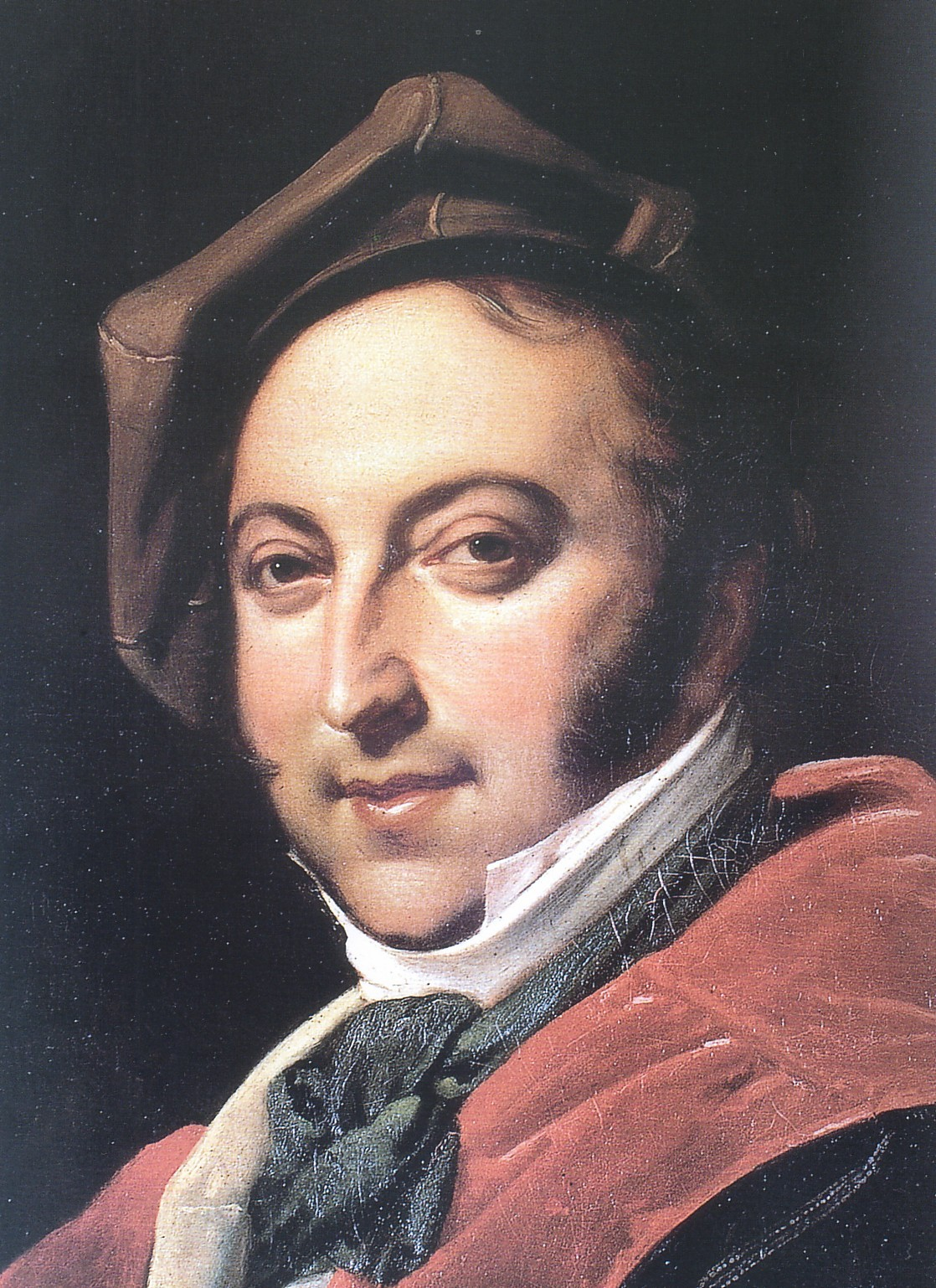
- Rossini c. 1820
- Librettist: Cesare della Valle
- Language: Italian
- Based on: Valle's play Anna Erizo
- Premiere: 3 December 1820; Teatro di San Carlo, Naples

Maometto II (or Maometto secondo) is an 1820 opera in two acts by Gioachino Rossini to an Italian libretto by Cesare della Valle. Set in the 1470s during a time of war between the Turks and Venetians, the work was commissioned by the Teatro di San Carlo in Naples. Della Valle based his libretto on his earlier play Anna Erizo. The name of the title character, Maometto II, refers to the real-life Ottoman Sultan and conqueror of Constantinople Mehmed II, who lived from 1432 to 1481.

Regarded "in some ways [as his] most ambitious opera" and as "the best of Rossini's Neapolitan operas", Maometto II failed to find an audience in Naples and, "to help ensure [its] success in Venice and Paris, he smoothed out the most audacious elements of the score". Venice first saw it on 22 December 1822 and then, translated into French and changed significantly, it was presented as Le siège de Corinthe in 1826.

Until the preparation of the critical editions of Maometto II, the composer's original intentions remained obscure. The introduction to an early version prepared by musicologists Philip Gossett and Patricia Brauner (along with Claudio Scimone) notes some of the difficulties of determining what Rossini had intended:

Extraordinary for its dramatic power and the nobility of its musical content, Maometto II is also an opera that poses many textual problems, since Rossini's successive revisions were made directly in the autograph score. Using copies of the score dating back to the original productions of each of these versions, the critical edition reconstructs the text of the first version (Naples, 1820), which reflects the composer's original intentions.

A new critical edition was prepared under the supervision of Philip Gossett and edited by Dutch scholar Hans Schellevis. The first performances which used it were given by The Santa Fe Opera during its 2012 season and the German company, Bärenreiter, released the score for rentals in 2013.

== Composition history ==
The opera was written as Rossini's composing career was beginning to slow down to one opera per year, and it appeared almost a year after Bianca e Falliero, although it was succeeded very quickly by Matilde di Shabran. In accepting the commission from the San Carlo in May 1820, it became clear when Rossini began composing the opera, that it "would be the most ambitious of all [his] works for the Italian stage". As it turned out, "its composition process was long and laborious, the circumstances of its making unexpectedly fraught".

From early 1820, various political upheavals threatened the rule of King Ferdinand I and these prevented theatrical productions and extended the composition process. During this time, Rossini "modified della Valle's libretto, accentuating the human aspect of the tragedy, playing down the political and nationalistic elements".

By late 1820, the political situation was sufficiently under control to allow theatrical activity to continue and, while the production of Maometto II missed many deadlines, its first performance took place at the Teatro di San Carlo in Naples on 3 December 1820. However, the opera "was not much liked by the Neapolitans" since the composer was "moving in a direction the Naples audience was reluctant to follow".

== Musical structure ==
Musicologists have identified many distinctive elements of the 1820 score for Naples which moved beyond the then-existing traditions. As Philip Gossett notes: "Italian opera of the early nineteenth century worked within a finely tuned system of musical and dramatic conventions, many of which were developed and codified in Rossini's earlier operas."

Some of these new features explain the reason for the opera's rejection by Neapolitan audiences of that time, because "Rossini carried his art far beyond [their] capabilities." One feature is that act 1 lasts 90 minutes and contains only five sections, one of which is the "terzettone" (a name unique to Rossini meaning "a big fat trio"). This trio runs some 25 minutes and includes "the temporary departure of two principals, intrusive cannon fire, an outbreak of popular dismay, and a prayer."

Another element is a move away from a conventional bel canto era finale which usually contained a florid and virtuosic rondo for a happy ending or a cabaletta for a tragic one. Instead, Rossini gives the prima donna a 40-minute display of vocal artistry during which she never leaves the stage. In the 1822 Venice revision, Rossini substituted his own aria "Tanti affetti in tal momento" from La donna del lago in order to achieve the conventional effect, as well as to create a happy ending. Also, as Gossett notes, a significant additional feature of the opera is that there are only five independent arias in the opera, only two of which end with cabalettas.

== Performance history ==
=== The Venice version and other productions in Europe, 1823–1826 ===
In Venice, this version "was well received when Rossini revised it for performances....at the Teatro La Fenice in December 1822.", his last composition for an Italian house. However, the composer had to bow to a need for a significant change to the original ending, thus "spar[ing] Venetian sensibilities by providing a happy [one]".

Philip Gossett provides an explanation for the change made to the Venice score, which includes this happy ending: it is "to remove the horror of the historical catastrophe" and, therefore, Rossini instructed a copyist to end the opera using the rondo, "Tanti affeti in tal momento", from his La donna del lago of 1819, thus removing Maometto's final confrontation with Anna, his discovery of her marriage to Calbo, and her suicide. This version also includes music from Bianca e Falliero. In 1823 and 1824, Maometto II was presented in Vienna and in Milan and then in Lisbon in 1826, but after that it dropped out of sight.

=== Maometto II becomes Le siège de Corinthe ===
"A large part of [Maometto's] score [was adapted] to a new French libretto" and staged in Paris on 9 October 1826 as Le siège de Corinthe, the wars between the Greeks and the Turks then being topical, in the context of the Greek War of Independence.

=== 20th and 21st century productions ===
In its original form Maometto II disappeared for almost 150 years. In 1976 the Metropolitan Opera "performed what they called L'assedio di Corinto, an Italian translation of Rossini's French revision of the score". A version was presented by the Rossini Festival in Pesaro in 1985. The San Francisco Opera production on 17 September 1988 was regarded as being "closer to the original Rossini version of the opera, but it too was highly problematic." No references to a production in the UK exist.

In January 2004 a version of the opera was presented in Bilbao by the ABAO company. It featured Simone Alaimo and June Anderson in the major roles. The Venice version was given at La Fenice in February 2005, while performances using a version edited by conductor Claudio Scimone were given at the Pesaro Festival in August 2008.

=== Maometto II restored ===
The Santa Fe Opera (New Mexico) gave a restored 1820 Naples Maometto II its world premiere on 14 July 2012. The performance used a critical edition by Dutch scholar Hans Schellevis which was published by Bärenreiter of Kassel in 2013 under the general editorship of musicologist Philip Gossett, who was present as advisor in Santa Fe during rehearsals. The cast featured Luca Pisaroni in the title role, soprano Leah Crocetto (grand prize winner of the 2010 Metropolitan Opera National Council Auditions) as Anna, mezzo-soprano Patricia Bardon as Calbo, and tenor Bruce Sledge as Erisso. Directed by David Alden, the production was set in the 1820s.

Garsington Opera in England presented the British premiere of the critical edition during its 2013 summer season. The Canadian Opera Company performed the work during its 2015–16 season, using the Santa Fe Opera production.

== Roles ==
Roles, voice types, premiere cast
Role	Voice type	Premiere cast, 3 December 1820 Conductor: Nicola Festa
Maometto II (Mehmed II)	bass	Filippo Galli
Paolo Erisso, head of the Venetians in Negroponte	tenor	Andrea Nozzari
Anna, his daughter	soprano	Isabella Colbran
Calbo, Venetian noble	mezzo-soprano or contralto	Adelaide Comelli
Condulmiero, Venetian noble	tenor	Giuseppe Ciccimarra
Selimo, Muslim noble	tenor	Gaetano Chizzola

== Synopsis ==
Time: 1470
Place: Negroponte, in the Aegean Sea

=== Act 1 ===
[For the Venice version, 1822: Rossini added an overture]

The palace of the Governor, Erisso

Byzantium has just fallen to the Turks, and the troops of Maometto II (Sultan Mehmed II) are laying siege at the Venetian city of Negroponte (Chalkis). Maometto has demanded the surrender of the city the following day.

Amongst the Venetians, a council of war is being held and different opinions as to proposed actions are expressed. Young Calbo pushes Paolo Erisso to go on fighting and defend the city, while General Condulmiero wishes to yield. The consensus is to continue fighting and the troops swear allegiance to Calbo.

Another part of the palace

Alone, Erisso's daughter, Anna, contemplates her father's plight. Aria: "Ah! che invan su questo ciglio" (Ah! In vain I call for sweet oblivion). Erisso enters along with Calbo, and he explains their situation, suggesting that she marry Calbo as additional protection. However, her discomfort is clear: she explains that she has fallen in love with a man named Uberto while her father was away in Venice. When told that this same Uberto traveled with Erisso and never remained in Corinth, she realizes that she has been duped by an unknown noble.

Trio: "Ohime! qual fulmine" (Alas, what a thunderbolt). Erisso gives her a dagger with which to defend herself if necessary.

[This begins the terzettone ("the big fat trio") which runs through the following 25 minutes of the action, including the tempo di mezzo of the cannon shot]

A cannon shot is heard, and Erisso and Calbo rush off to battle. Anna leaves to go to the church to pray.

A square outside the church

The women gather and, upon Anna's arrival, she learns from them that a traitor has allowed entry into the city by the Turks. Briefly, Anna prays: "Giusto cielo" (Merciful heaven, in such peril / no counsel, / no hope / is forthcoming). All take refuge in the church.

The city, the following morning

Maometto and his men enter the city, which he seems to know well. Selim is curious as to why, but his general reveals nothing. Then soldiers rush in and announce that Erisso and Calbo have been captured. Both men are led in, in chains. Maometto recognizes their gallantry, but demands that they and their men surrender and states that then all will be released. By his silence, Erisso rejects the offer and, as the two are about to be led away to be tortured, Anna and the women appear from the church.

Each character recognizes the situation with which they are confronted: Anna realizes that Maometto is the man who was her lover "Uberto"; Maometto is dumbfounded to re-discover Anna; and Erisso, similarly dumbfounded, cannot believe that she could have fallen for the Sultan. Each of the other characters also expresses their anguish or surprise. Anna threatens to kill herself unless Maometto releases Erisso and Calbo; he agrees. Although he is confused about her continuing love, he promises her a life of luxury.

=== Act 2 ===
Maometto's tent

Anna, who has been taken to Maometto's tent, is surrounded by Muslim girls who appeal to her to soften her feelings towards him. Indignantly, she rejects them and states her determination to escape. At that moment, Maometto enters. He says that he understands her conflicting emotions on discovering that Uberto is now Maometto, but he still loves her and wishes her to reign with him as queen of Italy while he will allow her father and Calbo (who has been described as her brother) to live. Rejecting him, she declares "I loved Uberto; I loathe a liar" and continues to explain that her love for her country is so strong that she could never love him as much.

In their duet ("Anna, tu piangi? Il pianto / pur non è d'odio un segno" / Anna, are you crying? Your tears are not a sign of hatred...) her conflicting emotions are revealed with Maometto declaring that she will eventually be his and Anna stating "I love, but sooner would I be buried than yield to love".

Noise from outside is revealed to be Maometto's soldiers ready to continue their attack on the citadel. As he prepares to leave, Maometto promises that while he still has a hope of possessing Anna, he will protect her father. She insists on something to guarantee her safety in his absence and, as a symbol of his promise and his protection, he gives her his imperial seal of authority. Urged on by his captains, Maometto vows to fight or die as they leave for battle in the citadel: (Aria: "All'invito generoso" / At this gallant request). Anna vows to find a means of preserving her honor, and also leaves.

The church vaults with Anna's mother's tomb

Erisso and Calbo are hiding in the vault. Erisso speaks of his frustration, wishing that he could be fighting again in the citadel. He kneels before his wife's tomb wishing that he too was dead and not having to endure his daughter's disgrace and to see her with Maometto. Calbo tries to assure him that Anna was duped, that she is innocent, and that she was forcefully abducted by Maometto's men: (Aria: "Non temer: d'un basso affetto / non fu mai quel cor capace" / Do not fear: that heart was never capable of base emotions).

[Venice version, 1822: At this point, Maometto enters and confront the two men. Maometto proclaims that he still wishes to marry Anna, but Erisso states that he would rather kill his daughter. In a duet which becomes a trio, the three men lay their out their claims and feelings, Calbo asserting his love for Anna, Erisso revealing that Anna has become Calbo's wife, and when Maometto swears vengeance upon the two men, Calbo taunts him to return to the battlefield. The trio concludes with all three claiming that Anna shall be his reward—as a father, as a lover, as a husband. Maometto then leaves. All of the confrontation between Anna, her father, and Calbo is omitted].

While Erisso hopes that Calbo is right, Anna enters. Initially, he spurns his daughter for consorting with the enemy but she swears that she will never marry Maometto. As proof, Anna gives him Maometto's seal, which will enable both men to come out of hiding. However, she declares that she must die, but not before her father marries her to Calbo at her mother's tomb. Erisso clasps both their hands in his as they all stand beside the tomb: (Terzettino: "In questi estremi istanti" / In these moments...). The two men depart for the combat against Maometto.

Alone, Anna contemplates her situation (Aria: "Alfin compita è la metà dell'opra" / At last one half of the task is accomplished). From the church above the vaults, a chorus of women are praying: "Nume, cui 'l sole è trono" / O God whose throne is the sun... Turn your face again to us.

[Venice version, 1822: The women join Anna and a commotion is heard as the battle rages. Suddenly, the Venetian soldiers rush in proclaiming their victory and they are followed by Erisso and Calbo. Erisso embraces his daughter and tells her that she must give herself in marriage to Calbo: "Let your hand be the reward for his love". She agrees. (Aria: "Tanti affetti in tal momento" / So many emotions all at once, Rossini's aria from La donna del lago (1819).
With the women and soldiers singing of their joy, Anna joins Calbo at the altar as the opera ends.]

When the women stop, they call out to Anna and a few of them enter the vault to tell her that Maometto has been defeated by Erisso and has fled, but that her life is now in danger, since he will be seeking revenge. She tells them that she would rather die.

Maometto's men rush in, but they appear to be powerless to act, in spite of her demands: "Sì ferite: il chieggo, il merto" / Yes, strike: I ask it, I deserve it. At that moment, Maometto and his captains enter and confront Anna. Maometto asks for his seal to be returned, but telling him that she gave it to her father and that she has married Calbo, she stabs herself and dies on her mother's tomb.

== Recordings ==
Year	Cast (Maometto, Anna, Calbo, Erisso)	Conductor, opera house and orchestra	Label
1983	Samuel Ramey, June Anderson, Margarita Zimmermann, Ernesto Palacio	Claudio Scimone, Philharmonia Orchestra and Ambrosian Opera Chorus	CD: Philips; Cat: 475 509-2
1985	Samuel Ramey, Cecilia Gasdia, Lucia Valentini Terrani, Chris Merritt	Claudio Scimone, Prague Philharmonic Orchestra and European Festival Chorus (Video recording of a performance at the Pesaro Rossini Festival)	DVD: Premiere Opera; Cat: 5187
2005	Lorenzo Regazzo, Carmen Giannattasio, Annarita Gemmabella, Maxim Mironov	Claudio Scimone, Orchestra and chorus of the Teatro La Fenice (Video recording of a performance at La Fenice of the version performed in that theatre in 1822, February).	DVD: Dynamic; Cat: DV 33492
2008	Michele Pertusi, Marina Rebeka, Daniela Barcellona, Francesco Meli	Gustav Kuhn, Orchestra Haydn di Bolzano e Trento and Prague Chamber Chorus (Recording of a performance in the Adriatic Arena, Pesaro, August)	CD: Celestial Audio; Cat: CA 831
2013	Darren Jeffery, Siàn Davies, Caitlin Hulcup, Paul Nilon	David Parry, Garsington Opera Orchestra and Chorus, (Recording of performances at Garsington Opera at Wormsley, June & July)	CD: AVIE, Cat: AV2312
2018	Mirco Palazzi, Elisa Balbo, Victoria Yarovaya, Mert Süngü	Antonino Fogliani, Orchestra: Virtuosi Brunensis; Choir: Poznań Camerata Bach Choir	CD: Naxos; 8.660444-46
