= June Anderson =

American dramatic coloratura soprano

- Born: December 30, 1952 (age 73); Boston, Massachusetts, United States
- Education: Yale University
- Occupation: Operatic soprano
- Years active: 1978–2014
- Awards: Grammy Award; Ordre des Arts et des Lettres

June Anderson (born December 30, 1952) is an American dramatic coloratura soprano. She is known for bel canto performances of Rossini, Donizetti, and Vincenzo Bellini.

Subsequently, she has extended her repertoire to include a wide variety of other roles, including those from the Russian repertoire and works by Richard Strauss. In 2008, Anderson was elevated to Commandeur of the Ordre des Arts et des Lettres by the French Government and in 2007 received a "Victoire d'honneur" in the Victoires de la musique classique in Paris.

Anderson has performed in noted opera houses including La Scala, Covent Garden, La Fenice, Metropolitan Opera, San Francisco Opera, Lyric Opera of Chicago and Teatro Colón. She has collaborated with conductors Leonard Bernstein, James Levine, Charles Dutoit, Zubin Mehta, Riccardo Muti, Seiji Ozawa, Giuseppe Sinopoli, Kent Nagano and Michael Tilson Thomas.

== Early life ==
June Anderson was born in Boston, Massachusetts, and raised in Wallingford, Connecticut. She attended Lyman Hall High School where she was the 5th highest in academic standing among 505 graduates in the class of 1970. She began vocal studies at age 11 and at age 17 was the youngest finalist (at that time) in the Metropolitan Opera auditions.

She received a degree from Yale University in French, graduating cum laude and then decided to pursue a career in singing. Anderson studied voice under Robert Leonard in New York City. She had numerous auditions but no engagements at first. She has said that she continued her pursuit as a challenge, giving herself a deadline of two years (after which she would, if unsuccessful, enter law school). "No one wanted to know my name. I was down to my last $50. That's when I decided I was going to be a singer if it killed me!"

== Career ==
=== Early career ===
Anderson sang in several productions in the Yale/New Haven area while still a high school student. In 1968, she sang in a production of Haydn's "L'infedeltà delusa" at Yale University. In 1970 she appeared as Gilda with the New Haven Opera Company in a production of Verdi's Rigoletto.

She made her professional opera debut as the Queen of the Night in Mozart's The Magic Flute at the New York City Opera in 1978. Several years later, she would voice the Queen of the Night in the Oscar-winning Amadeus, directed by Miloš Forman. While at New York City Opera, she sang in a wide range of operas including The Golden Cockerel by Rimsky-Korsakov, Rigoletto and La Traviata by Verdi, Rossini's Il barbiere di Siviglia, Giulio Cesare by Handel, and Mozart's Don Giovanni (as Elvira). In 1981, she sang the three lead soprano roles in Les Contes d'Hoffmann by Jacques Offenbach, the first soprano to do so at New York City Opera since Beverly Sills in 1973.

=== 1980s ===
Anderson left New York City Opera in 1982 and embarked on a European career. Anderson's career in this decade was marked by numerous debuts in quintessential bel canto roles in major European opera houses. She also participated in the recording of operatic works rarely heard in this era, including: Rossini's Mosè in Egitto, Wagner's Die Feen, Bizet's La jolie fille de Perth, Adolphe Adam's Le postillon de Lonjumeau, Fromental Halévy's La Juive, and Daniel Auber's La muette de Portici.

After being recommended to an Italian agent by Sherrill Milnes, she made her European performance debut in 1982 in the title role of Rossini's Semiramide in Rome. In 1983, Anderson debuted in Florence and Geneva in the title role of Lucia di Lammermoor by Donizetti, a part which became one of her most frequent portrayals. She also sang Die Feen by Wagner in Munich, and appeared in North America: Bellini's I puritani in Edmonton and Il barbiere di Siviglia in Seattle.

In 1984, she performed her first Amina in Vincenzo Bellini's La sonnambula in Venice, opening 135 years to the day after Maria Malibran's final Amina in that same theatre. She also appeared as Marie in La fille du régiment by Donizetti in Parma. In 1985, Anderson debuted as Isabelle in the historic revival of Robert le Diable by Meyerbeer in Paris. That year she also appeared in a rarely seen Verdi work, La battaglia di Legnano, in Pittsburgh.

In 1986, she performed her first Desdemona in Rossini's Otello in Venice. The same year, she made her debut at La Scala in Milan in La sonnambula, and her debut at Covent Garden in productions of Semiramide and Lucia di Lammermoor. She also appeared in La fille du régiment at the Opéra-Comique in Paris.

Anderson returned to the Opéra-Comique in 1987, appearing as Elvira in Bellini's I Puritani, and gave a recital at the Paris Opera with Alfredo Kraus. In Italy, she returned to La Scala for her debut as Giuletta in I Capuleti e i Montecchi and returned to Venice for her first performance of Beatrice di Tenda, also by Bellini.

Anderson also appeared in a 1988 concert version of Beatrice di Tenda at Carnegie Hall, with the Opera Orchestra of New York.

Elsewhere in 1988, Anderson focused on Rossini roles: playing her first Armida in Aix-en-Provence, appearing in Otello at the Pesaro Festival, and debuting as Anna in Maometto II (an early version of Rossini's Le siège de Corinthe) at the San Francisco Opera (she had previously recorded this work with Samuel Ramey in 1983). She also appeared that year in Luisa Miller by Verdi at the Opéra National de Lyon. In 1989, she made her long-awaited debut at New York's Metropolitan Opera as Gilda in Rigoletto, with Luciano Pavarotti. The New York Times review wrote of her Met debut:

Miss Anderson's debut as Gilda, although belated, could not have been more welcome. The Metropolitan is not rich in artists of this caliber. The tall soprano left America a decade ago to build a phenomenal European career, chiefly in the florid works of Bellini, Donizetti and Rossini. She demonstrated in a Caro nome of exquisite taste, effortless fluidity and pinpoint precision that she is a master of the bel canto style. She is comfortable above high C, but the lower ranges do not suffer in quality or power. The wide leaps of the Caro nome coda were taken effortlessly and squarely on the note. The Met audience does not often hear a trill as thrushlike and as precise as Miss Anderson's, nor a soprano who can soar as grandly over the ensemble in the quartet.

In July 1989, she sang at the inaugural gala of the new Opéra Bastille in Paris, performing Ombre légère from Le pardon de Ploërmel, by Meyerbeer. (Not a fan of the modernist space, Anderson was later quoted as saying, "The place looks like a gymnasium." )

Leonard Bernstein selected her to perform as Cunegonde in a December 13, 1989 London concert version of Candide conducted by the composer (for which she later shared an award for Best Classical Album at the 34th annual Grammy Awards (1992), given for the December 1989 Abbey Road Studios recording by the same cast and conductor).

Twelve days later, again with Bernstein, she appeared in Berlin for a Christmas Day performance of Beethoven's Symphony No. 9 in D minor "Choral" at the Schauspielhaus, celebrating the fall of the Berlin Wall. Along with Anderson, it featured mezzo-soprano Sarah Walker, tenor Klaus König and bass Jan-Hendrik Rootering; the concert was recorded by Deutsche Grammophon and published under the title "Ode an die Freiheit". The performance was broadcast live in more than twenty countries to an estimated audience of 100 million people, and was performed by an orchestra and chorus made up of many nationalities: from Germany, the Bavarian Radio Symphony Orchestra and Chorus, the Chorus of the Berlin Radio Symphony Orchestra, and members of the Sächsische Staatskapelle Dresden; from the Soviet Union, members of the Orchestra of the Kirov Theatre, from the United Kingdom, members of the London Symphony Orchestra; from the US, members of the New York Philharmonic, and from France, members of the Orchestre de Paris.

=== 1990s ===
In the next decade, Anderson continued to pursue traditional bel canto roles, but also expanded her repertoire. Anderson began with a January 1990 performance of the Berlioz song cycle Les nuits d'été at Carnegie Hall, with Giuseppe Sinopoli conducting London's Philharmonia Orchestra. Later that year, she appeared at the Metropolitan Opera in an opulent production of Rossini's Semiramide, with Marilyn Horne and Samuel Ramey. In 1990, Anderson also performed in Pesaro in a production of the rarely seen Ricciardo e Zoraide, also by Rossini, and visited the Lyric Opera of Chicago in a new production of Lucia di Lammermoor directed by Andrei Şerban. She closed 1990 with her New Year's Eve gala concert with Zubin Mehta and the New York Philharmonic broadcast nationwide on Live from Lincoln Center on PBS.

In February 1991, she returned to Carnegie Hall to perform La sonnambula with the Opera Orchestra of New York. Also in 1991, she participated in the Gala celebrating the Silver Anniversary of the "new" house of Metropolitan Opera, performing "Je suis Titania" from Mignon, conducted by James Levine. She also sang with Pavarotti at a gala concert in Teatro Valli in Reggio Emilia, Italy to celebrate the 30th anniversary of his first stage appearance.

In 1992, she created her first Elena in La donna del lago at La Scala, the house's first production of the opera in 150 years, staged to mark the bicentenary of Rossini's birth. That same year, she appeared in a controversial new production of Lucia di Lammermoor at the Metropolitan Opera staged by Francesca Zambello. Edward Rothstein wrote in The New York Times:

[S]ome of the audience's outrage may have been due to the contrast between the staging and the many musical virtues that survived in the performance, which was the most complete version of the score ever presented at the Met. June Anderson -- who must have had black-and-blue arms by the evening's end, so often was she grabbed and tossed about -- sang Lucia with more and more refined empathy as the opera proceeded....She delivered a mad scene that combined virtuosic control with a lovely, haunting innocence.

The following year, Anderson appeared as Maria in Tchaikovsky's Mazeppa, in a concert performance at Carnegie Hall with the Opera Orchestra of New York. In 1993, she also appeared in Verdi's La traviata at the Lyric Opera of Chicago. Of that performance, the Chicago Tribune critic wrote:

The show belongs, of course, to Violetta Valery. Anderson quite simply has done nothing finer for Lyric Opera. She internalized every emotion of the role with her usual intensity and conviction, from desperate gaiety to startled joy at her first stirrings of love for Alfredo, right on through to her deathbed scene, which tugged mightily at the heartstrings of even the most jaded opera-goers Every dramatic gesture seemed careful thought out, yet nothing appeared mannered or merely gratuitous. . . .[H]er fiorature were uniformly true, she was able to project easily throughout the theater even when singing softly (how beautifully she floated the bel canto line of "Addio, del passato", giving us both verses of the aria), and she commanded the audience's sympathy like the canny singing actress she is. Anderson's Violetta lives up to the great Lyric tradition.

Anderson began 1995 by appearing in Paris with Roberto Alagna in another controversial production of Lucia di Lammermoor, staged by Andrei Şerban and designed by William Dudley. While the International Herald Tribune noted that Şerban and Dudley were greeted by a "chorus of boos", it wrote of Anderson's performance:

[T]here were nothing but cheers for the impressive cast. June Anderson is surely the Lucia of the moment, and although she lent herself heroically to the frenetic demands of the staging, she also sang the role with superb possession of her vocal means and understanding of the psychological subtext.

Later in 1995, Anderson returned to the Metropolitan Opera in La fille du régiment with Pavarotti, of which The New York Times wrote:

Ms. Anderson's take on Marie is a legitimate one. Winsome charm is at a minimum; tomboy toughness takes over. The role is, of course, one of the coloratura soprano's richest gold mines. Ms. Anderson takes its long series of hurdles with courage, adventure and cool beauty of singing. Wearing a uniform as well as she does is no small help to the evening.

After appearing as Desdemona in Rossini's Otello for many years, in 1995 Anderson debuted in the same role in Verdi's Otello in Los Angeles, opposite Plácido Domingo. She also created her first Lucrezia in Verdi's I due Foscari at Covent Garden and ended the year with her debut as Rosalinde in Die Fledermaus at the Metropolitan Opera.

In 1996, Anderson portrayed Joan of Arc in Verdi's Giovanna d'Arco, both in concert versions in New York and Barcelona, and in a stage production at Covent Garden. She returned to Tchaikovsky in 1996, portraying her first Tatiana in Eugene Onegin in Tokyo. She also appeared in La Traviata, alongside the Italian tenor Salvatore Fisichella, in Tokyo that same year. She participated in the Gala celebrating James Levine's 25th Anniversary at the Metropolitan Opera, singing with Carlo Bergonzi and Ferruccio Furlanetto a selection from I Lombardi alla prima crociata, a work she recorded in its entirety with Levine, Luciano Pavarotti, Samuel Ramey and the Metropolitan Opera orchestra that same year.

In 1997, Anderson made her first appearance in Vincenzo Bellini's Norma at the Lyric Opera of Chicago. The Chicago Tribune noted that Anderson's "clear, bright upper range was at its clarion best, the soprano singing with strength and nuanced sensitivity" and hailed her acting as well: "[D]ramatically, Anderson was exceptional, drawing out all of the conflicting emotions with an intensity tempered by dignity." Later in 1997, she returned to the Opera Orchestra of New York to portray her first Elvira in Verdi's Ernani. In 1998, Anderson spoke in Opera News of her move away from light coloratura roles "into deeper water":

I wanted to put it off as long as possible. I kept saying, and it's been quoted so many times, I didn't want to do "Normina." I wanted to do Norma. And Leonora. I didn't want to sound like a soubrette trying to do these things. I've done things like Il Corsaro and La Battaglia di Legnano very early in my career, so Verdi's always been a presence. I did mostly Rigolettos and Traviatas, and then I added Desdemona a few years ago. ... So I suppose Leonora would be next in line."

Indeed, in 1998, Anderson played her first Leonora in Verdi's Il trovatore at the Metropolitan Opera, in a cast including Richard Margison and Dolora Zajick.

=== 2000s ===
In the 2000s, Anderson returned occasionally to her prior roles – appearing in Lucia in São Paulo in 2000 and Athens in 2002, La traviata at the Metropolitan Opera in 2001, and new productions of La sonnambula (Opéra de Marseille, 2004) and Maometto II (Bilbao, 2005). She continues to appear as Norma, in Parma in and Teatro Colón 2001, and at the Opéra de Marseille and the Canadian Opera Company in 2006. Of that latter performance, Toronto's The Globe and Mail wrote:

Bel canto is a term too often bandied about, but it does mean what it says: beautiful singing, but beautiful as distinct from merely pretty; beautiful not only in its musical sensitivity and accuracy of pitch in the face of extreme vocal challenges devised by the composer, but also in its penetration and detailed communication of the emotions encompassed in the music and drama. It was all this that June Anderson's Norma comprehended and conveyed. . . .

Anderson, [] also, as a bonus, looked the part: feminine, classy and dignified. I doubt there's been a markedly better Norma since Callas and Sutherland.

The Toronto Star wrote of Anderson's portrayal in Norma:

[T]he title role is a jewel for any soprano diva's crown. . . .And how very special that one of the great contemporary Normas, American soprano June Anderson, is present to bring down the house. . . . Anderson, a late addition to the cast, has a remarkable dramatic presence. . . Anderson captures the full conflict that besets Norma....The American soprano also captures the role's intimate side, first shown in the famous aria "Casta diva", which invokes the goddess of the moon. Anderson alone is worth the price of admission.

Anderson continued to claim new territory as well, with debut performances in Donizetti's Anna Bolena (Pittsburgh 2000) and Le convenienze ed inconvenienze teatrali (Monte Carlo 2004), The Bassarids by Hans Werner Henze (Théâtre du Châtelet, 2005), Rossini's Il viaggio a Reims (Monte Carlo 2005), and the Richard Strauss operas Capriccio (Naples 2002) and Daphne (La Fenice 2005). Of her debut in Daphne a reviewer in Opera magazine wrote:

The performance seemed to me an absolute triumph for June Anderson. At a career stage where she could reasonably be expected to scale down effort, ambition and new projects, she has instead taken the admirable decision to continue expanding her artistic range - as this first-ever Daphne (follow-up to her recent first ever Capriccio Countess) demonstrated.... [T]he singing offered countless ravishments: crystalline timbre, clean-cut line-delineation, dead-on-target intonation, awesomely easy projection of one perilously exposed high phrase after another.

In 2007, Anderson performed Verdi's Requiem in Paris with conductor Christoph Eschenbach and the Orchestre de Paris, Norma in Leipzig, and at galas at La Fenice in Venice (June 2007), and the Odeon of Herodes Atticus in Athens (July 2007) honoring the 30th anniversary of the death of Maria Callas. She appeared as Anna Bolena in Bilbao in October 2007, and ended the year with Verdi's Requiem in Manchester and at St. Paul's Cathedral in London.

In January 2008, Anderson was elevated from "Officier" to "Commandeur" of the Ordre des Arts et des Lettres by the French Government, the highest level of commendation within the Ordre recognizing "eminent artists and writers, as well as individuals who have contributed to the recognition of French culture in the world." Her 2008 schedule included recitals and concerts in Aix-en-Provence, Brussels, Bordeaux, Paris, a performance with conductor Kent Nagano and the Montreal Symphony Orchestra, at the Bel Canto Festival in Québec, and a Christmas concert in Geneva. In 2009, Anderson appeared in the title roles of Norma at Teatro Verdi in Trieste, Italy (February - March 2009), and Lucrezia Borgia at Opéra Royal de Wallonie in Liège, Belgium (June 2009).

In the 2010–11 season, June Anderson added two new roles to her repertoire: Madame Lidoine, in Dialogues des Carmelites at the Opéra de Nice, and Salome at the Opéra Royal de Wallonie. Her 2012 schedule included a further role debut as Pat Nixon in John Adams' Nixon in China at the Théâtre du Châtelet.

== Notable recordings ==
Recordings include:

Vincenzo Bellini

- Norma (DVD), w/ Daniela Barcellona, conducted by Fabio Biondi, live – Teatro Regio di Parma, 2001 (Tdk DVD/Video)
- La sonnambula, conducted by Roberto Cecconi, live – La Fenice, Venice, 1984 (MFOH 10506)
- Beatrice di Tenda, conducted by Gianfranco Masini, live – La Fenice, Venice, 1987(OPD-1174)
- Bellini Opera Arias arias from: I Puritani – I Capuleti e i Montecchi – La sonnambula – Beatrice di Tenda, conducted by Nicola Rescigno (1987) (EMI – CDC 747561 2)

Gioachino Rossini

- Semiramide, w/ Marilyn Horne, Samuel Ramey, conducted by James Conlon, live – Metropolitan Opera, 1990 (Image Entertainment)
- Mosè in Egitto, conducted by Claudio Scimone (1981) (PHILIPS 420 109–2)
- Maometto II, w/ Samuel Ramey, conducted by Claudio Scimone (1983) (PHILIPS 412 148–2)
- Rossini – Soirées Musicales (La regata veneziana – Il rimprovero – L'orgia – La partenza – La serenata – La pastorella – La pesca – La gita in gondola – La danza – La promessa – L'invito – I marinai) (1987, 1988) (NIMBUS – NI 5132)
- Rossini Scenes (arias from: Ermione – Semiramide – La donna del lago – Otello – William Tell- Il viaggio a Reims), conducted by Daniele Gatti (1991) (LONDON – 436 377–2)
- La donna del lago, conducted by Riccardo Muti, live performance La Scala, Milan (1992) (PHILIPS 438 211–2)

Gaetano Donizetti

- Lucia di Lammermoor, w/ Alfredo Kraus, conducted by Gianluigi Gelmetti, live – Florence (1983) (LS 1117/2)
- La fille du régiment, w/ Alfredo Kraus, conducted by Bruno Campanella, live – Opéra-Comique of Paris, 1986 (EMI CMS 763128 2)

Giuseppe Verdi

- Rigoletto, w/ Luciano Pavarotti, Leo Nucci, Shirley Verrett, Nicolai Ghiaurov, conducted by Riccardo Chailly (1989) (LONDON 425 864–2)
- I Lombardi alla prima crociata, w/ Luciano Pavarotti, Richard Leech, Samuel Ramey, cond. by James Levine (1996) (London 455 287–2)
- Luisa Miller (DVD), w/ T. Ichihara, Paul Plishka, live – Lyon National Opera, 1988 (Kultur Video)

Leonard Bernstein

- Candide, w/ Jerry Hadley, Christa Ludwig, Nicolai Gedda, cond. by Leonard Bernstein, 1989 (DEUTSCHE GRAMMOPHON 429 734–2)
- White House Cantata, w/ Thomas Hampson, Barbara Hendricks, cond. by Kent Nagano, 1998 (DEUTSCHE GRAMMOPHON 463 448–2)

Other composers/recordings

- Adolphe Adam, Le postillon de Lonjumeau, conducted by Thomas Fulton, 1985 (EMI 557106–2)
- Tomaso Albinoni, Il Nascimento dell'Aurora, conducted by Claudio Scimone, 1983 (ERATO 751–522)
- June Anderson Dal Vivo In Concerto (arias from La battaglia di Legnano- Verdi, La sonnambula – Vincenzo Bellini, Lucia di Lammermoor – Donizetti, La traviata – Verdi, Semiramide – Rossini) conducted by Miguel Angel Gomez Martinez, live performance Parma, Italy (1984) (BONGIOVANNI – GB 2504–2)
- June Anderson and Alfredo Kraus live from the Paris Opera (arias from Rigoletto – Verdi, Faust – Gounod, Semiramide – Rossini, Lakmé – Delibes, La traviata – Verdi, L'elisir d'amore – Donizetti, Lucia di Lammermoor – Donizetti, La fille du régiment – Donizetti), conducted by Michelangelo Veltri, live performance Paris (1987) (EMI – CDC 749067 2)
- Daniel Auber, La muette de Portici, w/ Alfredo Kraus, conducted by Thomas Fulton (1986) (EMI 7492842)
- Beethoven, Symphony No. 9 in D minor "Choral" – "Ode an die Freiheit" w/ Sarah Walker, Klaus König, Jan-Hendrik Rootering, conducted by Leonard Bernstein, live performance on Christmas Day Schauspielhaus Berlin (1989) (DEUTSCHE GRAMMOPHON – 429 861–2)
- Bizet, La jolie fille de Perth, w/ Alfredo Kraus, conducted by Georges Prêtre, 1985 (EMI 7475598)
- French Opera Arias (Arias from Hamlet – Ambroise Thomas, Robert le diable – Meyerbeer, Manon – Massenet, Roméo et Juliette – Gounod, Le pardon de Ploërmel – Meyerbeer, Ivan IV –Bizet, La vestale – Spontini, Les vêpres siciliennes – Verdi), conducted by Michel Plasson (1989) (EMI – CDC 754005 2)
- Fromental Halévy, La Juive, w/ José Carreras conducted by Antonio De Almeida (1986, 1989) (PHILIPS 420 190–2)
- Massenet, Chérubin (Pinchas Steinberg recording), w/ Frederica von Stade, Samuel Ramey, Dawn Upshaw, cond. by Pinchas Steinberg (1991) (RCA 09026-60593-2)
- Meyerbeer, Robert le diable, w/ Samuel Ramey, cond. by Thomas Fulton, live performance Opéra de Paris (1985) (Legato LCD 229–3)
- Mozart, The Magic Flute, w/ Barbara Hendricks, Jerry Hadley, conducted by Sir Charles Mackerras (1991) (TELARC CD-80302)
- Carl Orff, Carmina Burana, conducted by James Levine (1984) (DEUTSCHE GRAMMOPHON – 415 136–2)
- Giovanni Battista Pergolesi, Alessandro Scarlatti, Stabat Mater and Salve Regina w/ Cecilia Bartoli, conducted by Charles Dutoit (1991) (LONDON – 436 209–2)
- Richard Strauss, Daphne, conducted by Stefan Anton Reck, live performance La Fenice, Venice (2005) (Dynamic CDS 499/1-2)
- Ambroise Thomas, Hamlet, w/ Thomas Hampson, Samuel Ramey, Denyce Graves, cond. by Antonio de Almeida (1993) (EMI CDCC 7 54820 2)
- Wagner, Die Feen, conducted by Wolfgang Sawallisch, live performance Munich Opera Festival (1983) (ORFEO C 062 833 F)
- The Metropolitan Opera Gala 1991 (DEUTSCHE GRAMMOPHON DVD 00440-073-4582)
- James Levine's 25th Anniversary Metropolitan Opera Gala (!996) (DEUTSCHE GRAMMOPHON DVD B0004602-09)
