= Chérubin (Pinchas Steinberg recording) =

- RCA Victor Red Seal CD: 09026 60593 2

Studio album by Pinchas Steinberg
- Released: 1992
- Studio: Studio 1, Bavarian Radio, Munich
- Genre: Opera
- Length: 115:10
- Language: French
- Label: RCA Victor Red Seal
- Producer: Torsten Schreier

Chérubin is a 115-minute studio album of Jules Massenet's comic opera, performed by a cast headed by June Anderson, Samuel Ramey, Frederica von Stade and Dawn Upshaw with the Chorus of the Bavarian State Opera and the Munich Radio Orchestra under the direction of Pinchas Steinberg. It was released in 1992.

== Background ==
Von Stade, who sings the opera's title role, participated in this recording having already sung the part in concert in Carnegie Hall in 1984 and on stage with Santa Fe Opera in 1989.

== Recording ==
The album was digitally recorded on 8–16 April 1991 in Studio 1, Bavarian Radio, Munich, Germany. The album was co-produced by Bavarian Radio and BMG Classics.

== Cover art ==
The cover of the album, designed under the art direction of J. J. Stelmach, features a photograph by Murrae Haynes of von Stade performing in Chérubin at Santa Fe in 1989.

== Critical reception ==
=== Reviews ===
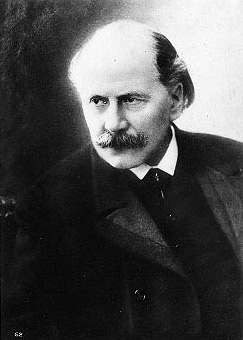
Jules Massenet in his late sixties, some five years after composing Chérubin

Richard Fairman reviewed the album in Gramophone in December 1992. In the title role, he thought, Frederica von Stade was good with reservations. She was successful in conveying the sensitive side of Chérubin's nature, and "marvellously touching, for example, in the nocturnal love duet, where Massenet conjures some of the score's most enchanting pages". Her Chérubin was less convincing, though, at those moments when he was at his most priapic, impetuous or eager for a fight. Vocally, she was in worse form than when she had sung the opera in concert seven years earlier, with less strength and ebullience in her tone and with signs of discomfort in her upper register. Both of the album's other female stars were slightly disappointing too. As the chaste ingénue Nina, Dawn Upshaw was very moving but "neither quite fresh and spontaneous" nor wholly in sympathy with Massenet's idiom. As the scintillating siren L'Ensoleillad, June Anderson tarnished the glamour of her performance by not singing with an even tone and by sliding up to her notes in unwarranted portamenti. The album's male principals raised no such concerns. Michel Sénéchal painted a "predictably engaging" portrait of his pompous Duke, and Samuel Ramey sang with an "appropriate air of mature wisdom" as the philosopher charged with the heavy burden of teaching Chérubin the difference between right and wrong. Conducting, Pinchas Steinberg favoured the brisk tempi appropriate to the opera's comic essence, although he slackened his pace whenever Massenet was seeking not just to amuse his audience but to speak to their hearts. The album's audio quality was good, with "spacious and clear sound". Readers unfamiliar with this long forgotten work would discover an erotic, rococo, "light and bubbly theatrical entertainment" that ultimately became something more, concluding in an affecting quarter of an hour in which Chérubin learned what the meaning of love truly was. Innocent of any cuts, the album could be recommended unequivocally to anyone wanting to get to know Massenet at his most cheerful.

J. B. Steane reviewed the album in Gramophone in January 1993. His assessment of Frederica von Stade's performance was more enthusiastic than his colleague's. She sang with "grace" in her opening quasi-minuet, with "ardour" in romantic passages, with "fine adolescent gallantry" when Chérubin was upholding his chivalric code and with a "touchingly restrained pathos" when it seemed as though the foolish young hothead might be digging an early grave for himself. As Nina, Dawn Upshaw sang "enchantingly" and conveyed the girl's uncomplicated greatness of spirit with subtlety and compassion. June Anderson's "accomplished" rendition of L'Ensoleillad was compromised by signs that the passing years had begun to dull the shine of her upper register. Samuel Ramey was "ideally firm and clean" in his singing but somewhat disappointing in his acting, making his philosopher rather starchy when a French cousin of Don Alfonso (in Mozart's Così fan tutte) would have been more enjoyable. The opera itself was even better than Cendrillon, Manon, Werther or any other of Massenet's more familiar compositions, indeed "the most finely-wrought, joyfully creative work in his output". The album was the most delightful of all the many that Steane had reviewed in the last three months.

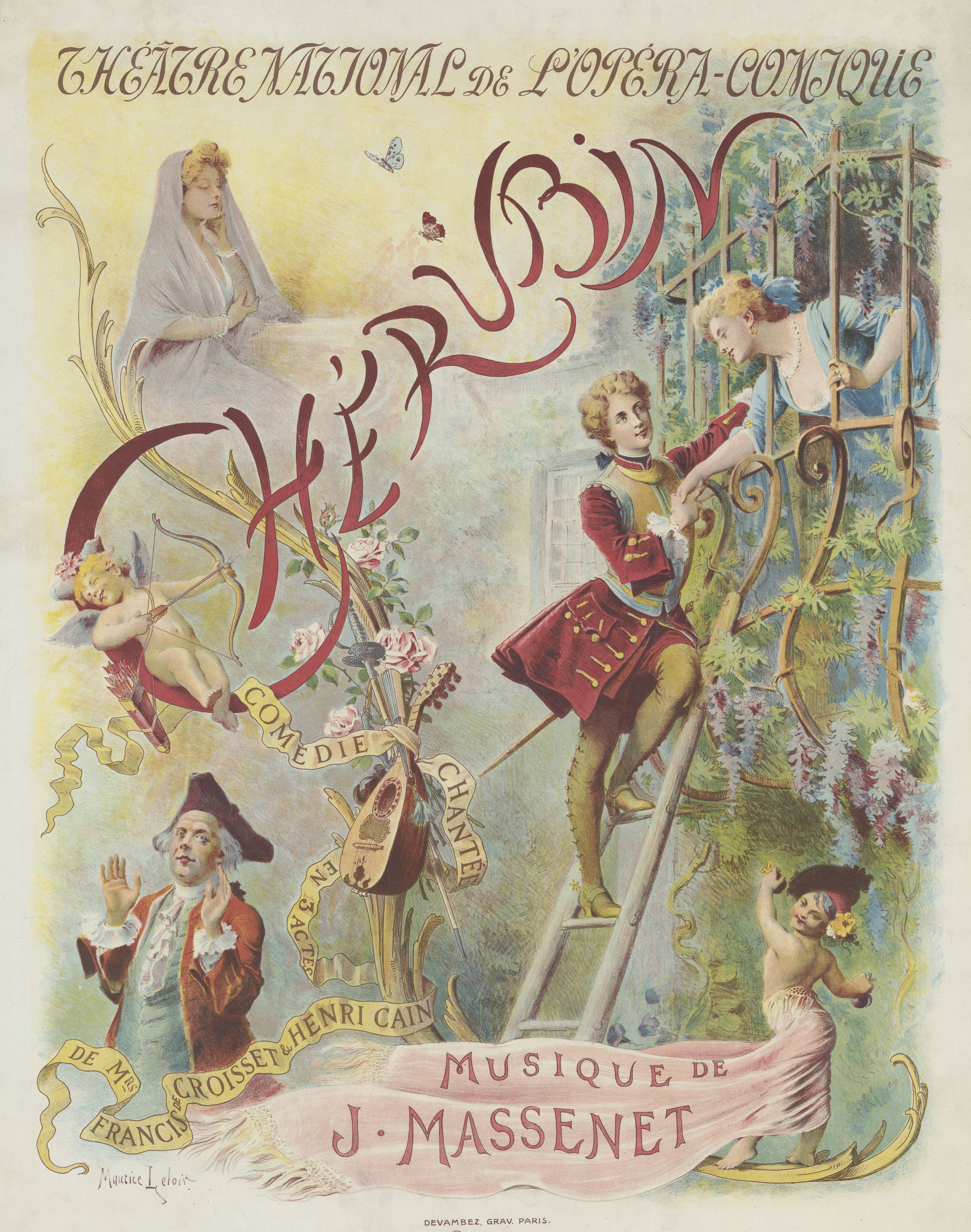
Maurice Leloir's poster for the première of Chérubin at the Opéra de Monte-Carlo in 1905

Eric Salzman reviewed the album in Stereo Review in February 1993. "What a cast!", he wrote, equally delighted by Frederica von Stade's Chérubin, Dawn Upshaw as "the faithful Nina", June Anderson as "the sexy dancer" and Samuel Ramey as "the Panglossian philosophy prof". He was just as enthusiastic about the chorus of the Bavarian State Opera, the Munich Radio Orchestra and Pinchas Steinberg's "elegant and inspired" conducting, but he used most of his article to praise the opera itself. Musically, its score was one of the most accomplished in Massenet's catalogue, blending "French Romanticism with Classical clarity, expressivity, wit and spirit". Indeed, its vocal writing was "as exquisite as anything in Massenet or French opera". Dramatically, there was no denying that it was ludicrous, passé and sexist, with a protagonist who was no longer the amorous butterfly of Mozart's Le nozze di Figaro but an "insufferable little macho punk of seventeen" who wanted to bed every woman that crossed his path. But, like its rascally hero, it was also utterly charming and ultimately good-hearted. All in all, the album was a "stunning" recording of a "remarkable and forgotten work".

Richard Fairman revisited the album in a survey of Massenet's discography in Gramophone's 2000 Awards issue. "With the three leading women's roles being taken by Frederica von Stade, June Anderson and Dawn Upshaw," he wrote, "it offers high-quality singing and lively personality to spare." Pinchas Steinberg's conducting and the album's audio quality were no less worthy of praise. The album as a whole was an "entertaining confection", giving collectors the opportunity to investigate an opera that had been forgotten for many decades but which included several stellar numbers that had once been familiar concert bon-bons.

=== Accolade ===
In the Gramophone Awards for 1993, the album was a runner-up for the prize for the year's best opera recording.

== Track listing: CD1 ==
Jules Massenet (1892-1912)

Chérubin (1905), Comédie chantée (sung comedy) in three acts, with a libretto by Francis de Croisset (1877–1937) and Henri Caïn (1857–1937) after de Croisset's play of the same name

- 1 (6:07) Overture

Act One

- 2 (5:09) "Servantes, bonnes et lingères" (Jacoppo, Servants, Count, Baron, Duke)
- 3 (3:05) "C'est moi, Philosophe!" (Nina, Jacoppo)
- 4 (4:08) "Mon tuteur! Monsieur, devant lui" (Nina, Duke, Baron, Jacoppo, Chérubin)
- 5 (4:27) "Nous danserons, c'est bien mieux" (Chérubin, Duke, Baron, Jacoppo, Countess, Baroness, Nina, Guests)
- 6 (10:$7) Fête pastorale (dance of villagers and farmhands)
  - "Bravo! - C'est ravissant!" (Nina, Guests, Chérubin, Duke, Baron, Jacoppo)
- 7 (8:08) "Où Chérubin se cache-t-il" (Count, Jacoppo, Countess, Nina, Chérubin)

== Track listing: CD2 ==
Act Two

- 1 (2:02) Entr'acte
- 2 (5:15) "Une chamber!... Rien!" (Travellers, Servants, Valets, Innkeeper, Countess, Baroness, Count, Baron, Duke)
- 3 (4:00) "Le vin rend gai, l'amour rend fou" (Ricardo, Manolas, Officers, Innkeeper, Countess, Baroness, Chérubin)
- 4 (5:42) "L'arme au fourreau. Le duel est défendu!" (Manolas, Chérubin, L'Ensoleillad, Ricardo, Officer, Jacoppo)
- 5 (2:48) "Vous parlez de péril, de crime" (L'Ensoleillad, Chorus)
- 6 (0:54) La Manola (dance of L'Ensoleillad)
- 7 (6:32) "Madame, en votre appartement" (Innkeeper, Chérubin, Ricardo, Manolas, L'Ensoleillad, Officers, Jacoppo)
- 8 (14:43) "Qui parle dans la nuit confuse?" (L'Ensoleillad, Chérubin, Count, Duke, Baron, Countess, Baroness)
- 9 (2:03) "Il est pris!" (Baron, Duke, Count, Chérubin, Innkeeper, Jacoppo, Servants, L'Ensoleillad, Countess, Baroness)

Act Three

- 10 (11:05) Entr'acte
  - "Chérubin! - Un moment" (Jacoppo, Chérubin, Innkeeper, Baroness, Countess, Baron, Count)
- 11 (3:50) Aubade: "Vive amour qui rêve, embrasse et fuit" (L'Ensoleillad, Chorus)
- 12 (5:50) "Par pitié! Ne pars pas!" (Chérubin, L'Ensoleillad, Duke, Chorus, Jacoppo)
- 13 (8:26) "Nina! - Chérubin!" (Chérubin, Nina, Duke, Ricardo, Jacoppo)

== Personnel ==
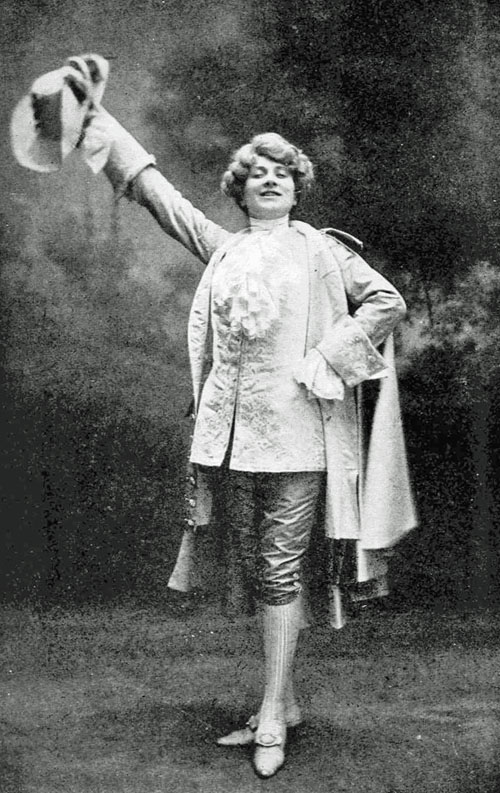
The first Chérubin: the Scottish soprano Mary Garden, who had also been the first Mélisande in Debussy's Pelléas et Mélisande in 1902

=== Musical ===
- Frederica von Stade (mezzo-soprano), Chérubin
- Samuel Ramey (bass), Jacoppo, a philosopher, tutor to Chérubin
- June Anderson (soprano), L'Ensoleillad, a Spanish dancer
- Dawn Upshaw (soprano), Nina, maid to the Countess
- Jean-Marc Ivaldi (baritone), Count
- Hélène Garetti (soprano), Countess
- Michel Trempont (baritone), Baron
- Brigitte Balleys (mezzo-soprano), Baroness
- Michel Sénéchal (tenor), Duke
- Claes Hakon Ahnsjö (tenor), Captain Ricardo
- Armand Arapian (baritone), Innkeeper
- Rainer Scholze (bass), Officer
- Chorus of the Bavarian State Opera (chorus master: Udo Mehrpohl)
- Munich Radio Orchestra
- Pinchas Steinberg, conductor

=== Other ===
- Jocelyne Dienst, French language coach
- Torsten Schreier, producer
- Hans Schmid, balance engineer
- Susanne Wocker, recording engineer
- Walter Spring, recording engineer

== Release history ==
In 1992, RCA Victor Red Seal released the album as a double CD (catalogue number 09026 60593 2) in a slipcase with a booklet. The latter provided photographs of Massenet, Anderson, Ramey, von Stade, Upshaw and Steinberg and libretti, synopses, notes by Norbert Christian and biographies of Anderson, Ramey, von Stade, Upshaw and Steinberg in English, French, German and Italian.
