= Pinchas Steinberg =

Israeli conductor (born 1945)

- פנחס שטיינברג
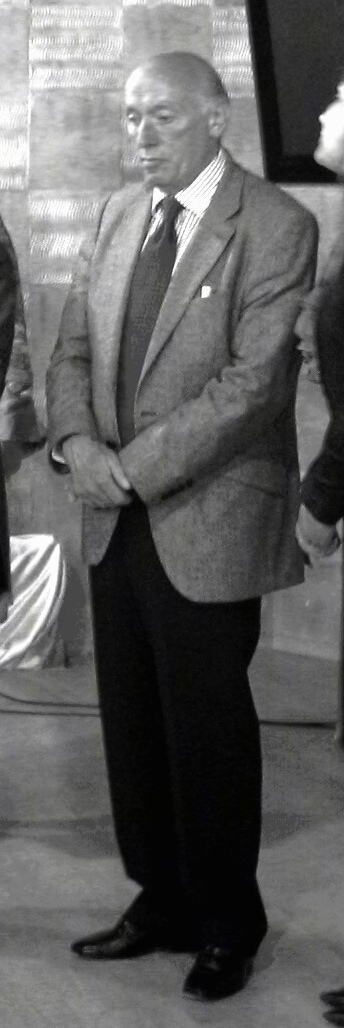

Personal details
- Born: 13 December 1945 (age 80) Mandatory Palestine

Pinchas Steinberg (Hebrew: פנחס שטיינברג; born 13 December 1945) is an Israeli conductor and violinist. He is currently the Chief Conductor of the Budapest Philharmonic Orchestra.

== Early career ==
Steinberg studied violin in the USA under Jascha Heifetz and Joseph Gingold. He also studied composition under Boris Blacher in Berlin.

His conducting debut was in 1974 with the Berlin Radio Symphony Orchestra, followed by invitations to conduct the Philharmonia Orchestra, Royal Philharmonic and London Symphony Orchestra.

== Guest Conducting ==
Steinberg was the Guest Conductor of the major European and American orchestras, including the Berlin Philharmonic, Czech Philharmonic, Orchestre de Paris, Orchestre National de France, Santa Cecilia Orchestra in Rome, Budapest Festival Orchestra, Israel Philharmonic, NHK Symphony Orchestra (Tokyo), Munich Philharmonic, Cleveland Orchestra, Boston Symphony Orchestra & Dallas Symphony Orchestra, Royal Stockholm Philharmonic, among many others.

== Festival Appearances ==
Guest appearances have included the festivals of Salzburg, Munich, Berlin, Prague, Bratislava, Vienna, Verona, Grenada, Orange and the Richard Strauss Festival in Garmisch.

== Opera ==
Steinberg's Opera performances include the Vienna State Opera, Covent Garden London, San Francisco, Paris, Rome Turin, Naples, Madrid, Barcelona, Munich, Berlin and Hamburg. His La Scala debut was in 2010, leading the Orchestra Filarmonica della Scala in 3 concerts of Robert Schumann’s Scenes from Goethe's Faust.

== Notable Achievements ==
- 1988 to 1993, Permanent Guest Conductor at the Vienna State Opera
- 1989 to 1996, Chief conductor Radio Symphony Orchestra in Vienna
- 2002-2005 Music director of the Orchestre de la Suisse Romande in Geneva.
- 2014–present, Chief conductor of the Budapest Philharmonic Orchestra

== Acclaimed Recordings & Repertoire ==
- Alfredo Catalani: La Wally (1990)
- Jules Massenet: Chérubin (1992) (awarded the Grand Prix du Disque, the Diapason d'Or, the German Critics Prize and the Caecilia Prize Bruxelles)
- Richard Wagner: Der fliegende Holländer (1993)
- Richard Strauss: Die Schweigsame Frau (2002)
- Wolfgang Amadeus Mozart: La Clemenza Di Tito (2006)

Cultural offices
Preceded by Lothar Zagrosek	Principal Conductor, Vienna Radio Symphony Orchestra; 1989–1996	Succeeded by Dennis Russell Davies
Preceded by György Győriványi Ráth	Chief Conductor, Budapest Philharmonic Orchestra; 2014–	Succeeded by incumbent
