= Le siège de Corinthe =

Opera by Gioachino Rossini

- Opera by Gioachino Rossini
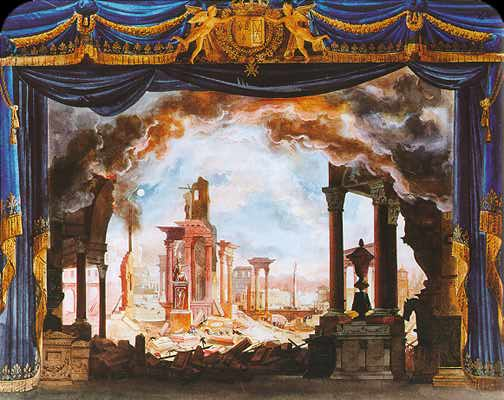
- The burning of Corinth: set design for the finale of the 1826 premiere
- Translation: The Siege of Corinth
- Librettist: Luigi Balocchi; Alexandre Soumet
- Language: French
- Based on: Third Siege of Missolonghi
- Premiere: 9 October 1826; Salle Le Peletier, Paris

L'assedio di Corinto (English: The Siege of Corinth; in its original French version Le siège de Corinthe) is an opera in three acts by Gioachino Rossini.

The opera was originally set to a French libretto by Luigi Balocchi and Alexandre Soumet, and was based on the reworking of some of the music from Rossini's 1820 opera for Naples, Maometto II, the Italian libretto of which was written by Cesare della Valle.

Le siège de Corinthe was Rossini's first opera written in French, and was first given at the Salle Le Peletier of the Paris Opéra on 9 October 1826. It then became popular across Europe in its 1828 Italian translation, L’assedio di Corinto, by Calisto Bassi.

== Composition history ==
The opera commemorates the siege and ultimate destruction of the town of Missolonghi in 1826 by Turkish troops during the ongoing Greek War of Independence (1821–1829). The same incident – condemned throughout Western Europe for its cruelty – also inspired a prominent painting by Eugène Delacroix (Greece Expiring on the Ruins of Missolonghi), and was mentioned in the writings of Victor Hugo. The reference to Corinth is an example of allegory, although Sultan Mehmed II had indeed besieged the city in the 1450s. Lord Byron's 1816 poem The Siege of Corinth has little, if any, connection with the opera as to its content.

Liszt wrote an Introduction and Variations for piano based on a march from this opera. That work was deemed lost or mistitled until 1976 when the introduction was discovered by Nancy B. Reich at Manhattanville College's library.

=== Revised version of Maometto II ===
The French version of this late Rossini opera was a partial rewrite of the composer's 1820 Italian opera, Maometto II, but with the same story and similar if differently named characters, in the setting of the Turks' 1470 conquest of the Venetian colony of Negroponte. That original version had premiered in Naples on 3 December 1820 – six years before the Missolonghi siege and massacre. The original Maometto was not well received, neither in Naples nor in Venice where Rossini tried out a somewhat revised version in 1823, this time with a happy ending using music from his own La donna del lago at the conclusion.

But in 1826, two years after settling in Paris, Rossini tried yet again, with yet another version (which included two ballets, as called for by French operatic tradition), transplanted it to the Peloponnese with the new title Le siège de Corinthe in a topical nod to the then-raging Greek war for independence from the Ottomans, and translated it into French. This time, Rossini succeeded, and the opera was performed in various countries over the next decade or so.

== Performance history ==
The first performance, in French, was at the Salle Le Peletier of the Paris Opéra on 9 October 1826. It was given as L'assedio di Corinto (translated by Calisto Bassi) in Parma on 26 January 1828 and it reached Vienna in July 1831. In the United States, the first performance was given in French by the Italian Opera House in New York in February 1833 and in Italian in February 1835. The opera became popular across Europe in its Italian translation by Calisto Bassi with a contralto in the tenor role of Neocle, but from the 1860s it disappeared entirely from the repertory and was no longer staged for roughly the next eighty years. However, the opera's overture remained widely popular and never left the concert orchestra repertory. More recently the overture has been performed and recorded by several contemporary classical orchestras, including the Academy of St. Martin-in-the-Fields conducted by Neville Marriner.

In 1949 Le siège de Corinthe was finally revived again in a production starring Renata Tebaldi in Florence. That production was repeated two years later in Rome. In 1969 La Scala revived it for the Rossini centennial with Beverly Sills, in her La Scala debut, as Pamira, Marilyn Horne as Neocle, and Thomas Schippers conducting. The opera used a performing edition by noted musicologist and bel canto expert Randolph Mickelson that made use of insertion arias from the original Neapolitan and Venetian versions and even from other obscure Rossini operas (as Rossini himself commonly did). In 1975, the Metropolitan Opera used the La Scala version for its premiere of the opera. The Met production was conducted by Schippers again and starred Beverly Sills in her Met debut, now opposite Shirley Verrett, Justino Díaz and Harry Theyard.

Since 1975, the only production of the opera in the US has been the October 2006 stagings of the French version by the Baltimore Opera, in a mid-19th century re-translation back into Italian, with one aria interpolated from one of the predecessor Maometto II versions and one from Rossini's Ciro in Babilonia. It featured Elizabeth Futral as Pamira and Vivica Genaux as Neocle.

Outside the US, the opera has been staged several times. It was produced in Florence in 1982 in Calisto Bassi's Italian version, starring Katia Ricciarelli and contralto Martine Dupuy, and under the direction of Pier Luigi Pizzi. In 1992 the same production was revived in Genoa starring Luciana Serra, but the original French version was chosen instead. The French version was also staged twice at the Rossini Opera Festival: in 2000 starring Michele Pertusi, Ruth Ann Swenson and Giuseppe Filianoti, and in 2017, following the new critical edition by Damien Colas, in a La Fura dels Baus production.

== Roles ==
Role	Voice type	Premiere Cast, 9 October 1826 (Conductor: François Antoine Habeneck)
Cléomène, Governor of Corinth	tenor	Louis Nourrit
Pamira, his daughter	soprano	Laure Cinti-Damoreau
Néoclès, a young Greek officer	tenor	Adolphe Nourrit
Mahomet II	bass	Henri-Étienne Dérivis
Adraste	tenor	Bonel
Hiéros	bass	Alexandre-Aimé Prévost
Ismène	mezzo-soprano	Frémont
Omar	tenor	Ferdinand Prévôt

== Synopsis ==
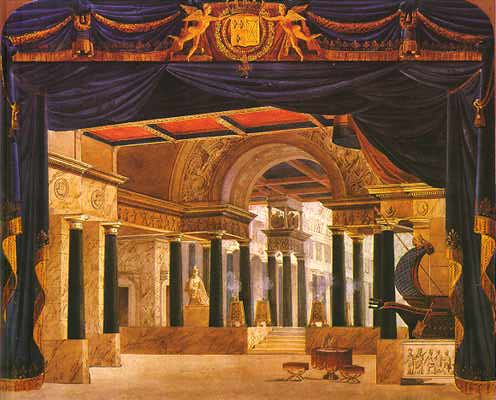
Décor for Act 1-Scene 1 of Le siège de Corinthe at the Paris Opéra

Place: Corinth
Time: 1459

=== Act 1 ===
SCENE ONE: Vestibule of the senate palace at Corinth

Cleomene, governor of Corinth, realizes that his depleted troops cannot withstand another attack. But Neocle, a young Greek officer, encourages the Greeks to keep fighting the Turks that are besieging the city. The soldiers depart for a new attack. Cleomene, impressed by Neocle's valor, has promised him his daughter Pamira in marriage. But she reveals that she loves a certain Almanzor whom she met recently in Athens. Cleomene starts questioning her about Almanzor, but he is called away to the battle. Before leaving he gives his daughter a sword which she must use on herself if the Turks succeed in capturing the city.

SCENE TWO: A Square in Corinth

The Turks are celebrating their victory and praising their leader, Maometto. Cleomene, now a prisoner, is brought in, and Maometto urges him to surrender; he refuses. Pamira rushes in to her father, then recognizes, in Maometto, the man she knew as Almanzor. Maometto offers to marry Pamira and make peace with the Greeks. Cleomene, however, insists she must marry Neocle. When Pamira refuses, Cleomene curses her and leaves her to Maometto.

=== Act 2 ===
Maometto's tent

Alone, Pamira is torn between her love for Maometto and her duty to her father and Greece. Maometto enters and tries to comfort her. Preparations begin for their wedding, but a commotion outside the tent interrupts the proceedings. It is Neocle, who has come to take Pamira back to the Greeks. Maometto, angry, is about to kill the intruder when Pamira claims he is her brother. The Greeks prepare for a new battle, and from the citadel Cleomene calls to Pamira. She deserts Maometto to join her father and country. Maometto vows that by sunrise every Greek will be dead.

=== Act 3 ===
The tombs of Corinth, illuminated by a multitude of fires

Neocle enters the catacombs, mastering his fear. He joins the Greeks who are preparing to make a final stand. In the distance, Pamira and the Greek women are heard in prayer. Cleomene recognizes Pamira's voice; but, feeling betrayed by her, he swears she is no longer his daughter. Maometto approaches and once again offers to marry Pamira and make peace with the Greeks. Cleomene would rather see Pamira die than married to their enemy. Neocle returns and reveals to Maometto that he isn't Pamira's brother, he's the man her father wants her to marry. Maometto, enraged, departs for the field of battle. Pamira enters and Neocle makes father and daughter reconcile. The three of them pray for God's protection. Jero, the guardian of the graves, enters with the Greek warriors; he blesses their banners and recalls ancient Greek victories at Marathon and Thermopylae. The men march off to battle, while Pamira and the women pray for God's mercy. When they hear Turkish cries of victory, the women prepare to die. Maometto, victorious, returns to claim Pamira; but she and the women kill themselves rather than submit. The building collapses, revealing behind it the city of Corinth in flames.

== Recordings ==
Year	Cast: Cléomène, Pamira, Néoclès, Maometto	Conductor, Opera House and Orchestra	Label
1969	Franco Bonisolli, Beverly Sills, Marilyn Horne, Justino Díaz	Thomas Schippers, Teatro alla Scala Orchestra and Chorus (Recording of a performance of the version prepared by Schippers and Randolph Mickelson at La Scala, 11 April)	Audio CD: Arkadia; Cat: CD 573; Legato Classics; Cat: LCD 135–2; Celestial Audio; Cat: CA 034
1974	Harry Theyard, Beverly Sills, Shirley Verrett, Justino Díaz	Thomas Schippers, London Symphony Orchestra, Ambrosian Opera Chorus (Recorded in July and August 1974)	Audio CD: EMI Classics; Cat: 64335
1975	Harry Theyard, Beverly Sills, Shirley Verrett, Justino Díaz	Thomas Schippers, Metropolitan Opera Orchestra and Chorus (Recording of a performance at the MET given in Italian in a version prepared by Thomas Schippers for La Scala, under the title ‘’L'assedio di Corinto")	Audio CD: Bensar; Cat: OL 41975
1992	Dano Raffanti, Luciana Serra, Maurizio Comencini, Marcello Lippi	Paolo Olmi, Orchestra and Chorus of the Teatro Carlo Felice, Genoa	Audio CD: Nuova Era; Cat: 7140-7142 & Cat: NE 7372/3; DVD: Hardy; Cat: HCD 4057
2000	Stephen Mark Brown, Ruth Ann Swenson, Giuseppe Filianoti, Michele Pertusi	Maurizio Benini, Opéra National de Lyon Orchestra and the Prague Chamber Chorus (Recording of a performance in French at the Rossini Opera Festival, Pesaro, 5 August)	Audio CD: House of Opera; Cat: CD 597; Charles Handelman, Live Opera; Cat: (unnumbered)
2010	Marc Sala, Majella Cullagh, Michael Spyres, Lorenzo Regazzo	Jean-Luc Tingaud, Virtuosi Brunensis and Camerata Bach Choir (Recording of performances at the Rossini in Wildbad Festival)	Audio CD: Naxos; Cat: 8.660329-30
