= Cesare della Valle =

Italian librettist (1776/77–1860)

Cesare della Valle (1776/77–1860) was Duke of Ventignano (a hamlet in Fucecchio, Florence). He is best known today as a playwright and librettist.

He wrote the libretto to Gioachino Rossini's opera Maometto II from his own drama tragedy Anna Erizo (1820). Both were based on real-life Ottoman Sultan Mehmed II who took Negroponte from the Venetians in 1470.

That opera was completely reworked a few years later into Le siège de Corinthe (1826), but based on the same characters and story created by della Valle.
