= Lisa Gasteen National Opera School =

The Lisa Gasteen National Opera School is a four-week program of study for young-professional or advanced-student opera singers and repetiteurs, founded by Lisa Gasteen, the Australian opera singer. It takes place in late-Spring and early-Summer in Brisbane, Queensland at venues provided by Queensland Conservatorium Griffith University. The summer school features a faculty of both Australian and international coaches and teachers. Endorsed by Lyndon Terracini, artistic director of Opera Australia, the summer school program will be held annually, subject to fundraising.

== Faculty and participants ==
The school launched in 2011 with musical faculty members including Lisa Gasteen AO, John Fisher, Giovanni Reggioli, Margaret Baker-Genovesi, Sharolyn Kimmorley AM and Jill Stoll. UK-based psychotherapist and expert on psychogenic dysphonia (voice problems due to emotional mismanagement) Phiroze Neemuchwala was a member of the non-musical faculty. Faculty members have been associated with the opera companies Metropolitan Opera, the Royal Opera, Covent Garden, Teatro alla Scala, Opera Australia, Teatro la Fenice, New York City Opera, Washington National Opera, Welsh National Opera, the Théâtre de la Monnaie, De Nederlandse Opera and Opera Queensland, as well as the Rossini Opera Festival, the Bergamo Donizetti Festival, Caramoor International Music Festival, Maggio Musicale Fiorentino, the Manhattan School of Music, Juilliard School, and both the Decca and Deutsche Grammophon classical recording labels.

Participation in the Lisa Gasteen National Opera School is open to Australian and New Zealand students by application and audition. Twenty places are offered to participants of all voice-types, as well as four student repetiteur positions.

== Background and course of study ==
The school was founded in 2011 by retired dramatic soprano Lisa Gasteen, who wanted to use her influence as Wagnerian soprano to help music education in Australia. Gasteen saw a need for an elite opera school for young Australian opera singers, being of the view that such students would look to gain experience in Australia before moving overseas to study or work. The financial benefits of bringing experienced opera coaches to Australia to work with a group of students as opposed to sending one student overseas were also a motivation for founding the school. Gasteen came out of retirement to raise funds for the inaugural summer school, performing in a fundraising concert with Australian-born international conductor Simone Young.

In its inaugural year, the school ran from Monday 21 November to Sunday 11 December. Attention is paid to suitability of repertoire, style and vocal technique. Vocal and repetiteur participants undertake a variety of both individual and ensemble coaching sessions, singing lessons, group "life skills" sessions, Alexander technique workshops, public and private workshops, and public master classes and performances.

In 2011, public master classes included a workshop lecture on the life and works of Claudio Monteverdi and a workshop on recitative and the use of the appoggiatura, both given by Margaret Baker-Genovesi, adjudicator and teacher, and retired opera singer. Giovanni Reggioli, Italian-born freelance conductor and coach, led a masterclass on Italian song. Public performances included an Italian song concert compered by Maestro Reggioli and a gala concert of opera scenes prepared by John Fisher.

Gasteen has discussed plans to develop the summer school into an autonomous opera school in the future, self-sustained by an endowment fund. The Queensland Conservatorium is considered an ideal location for a national opera school due to the high quality of performance venues such as the Conservatorium Theatre and the Concert Hall, as well as the ease of professional collaboration with Opera Queensland, with which the Conservatorium shares premises.

In 2012, The Lisa Gasteen National Opera School saw the return of guest coaches John Fisher, Giovanni Reggioli and Sharolyn Kimmorley and the addition of Sigfried Jerusalem and Philip Mayers to the music-teaching staff. German opera agent and advisor Manuela Kursidem was also in attendance at the school to provide first-hand advice to students wishing to sing in Europe.

In 2013, the returning faculty was joined by Australian operatic repetiteur and pianist Jennifer Marten-Smith.

In 2014, the program expanded to include a fourth week of teaching. The faculty featured returning guest coaches John Fisher, Giovanni Reggioli, Sharolyn Kimmorley and Philip Mayers. They were joined by bass, and former colleague of Gasteen, Robert Lloyd and repetiteur Richard Hetherington, a member of the permanent music staff at the Royal Opera House, Covent Garden.

In 2015, Hetherington joined the core staff again, which included a final Gala Concert featuring the Queensland Symphony Orchestra.

== Scholarships and prizes ==
The summer school provides a variety of scholarships, including four full-tuition scholarships for pianist repetiteurs, seven full and thirteen part-tuition scholarships for opera singers. In 2011 the Australian Singing Competition offered the Lisa Gasteen National Opera School Prize, a full-tuition scholarship, to one semi-finalist. In 2014 and 2015 the Australian Opera Awards Committee provided a full-tuition scholarship to one semi-finalist.
