= Pier Luigi Pizzi =

Italian opera director, set designer, and costume designer

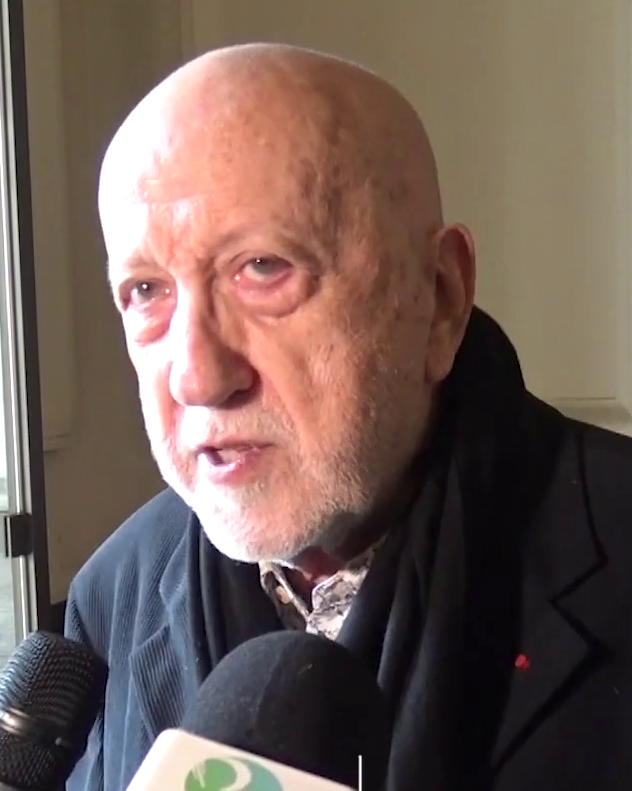
- Pizzi in 2021
- Born: 15 June 1930 (age 96); Milan, Italy
- Occupations: Theatre director, Set designer, Costume designer
- Years active: 1967 – present

Pier Luigi Pizzi (born 15 June 1930) is an Italian opera director, set and costume designer.

== Biography ==
Pizzi was born in Milan, Italy, and earned a degree in architecture at the Politecnico of Milan. Against the will of his sceptical father, he started working in the theatre in 1951 with Giorgio Strehler, and then at the Teatro Tommaseo in Genoa, which he soon brought together with Giorgio De Lullo and his theatre troupe Compagnia dei Giovani. Later he collaborated for many years as a set and costume designer with the director Luca Ronconi on both plays and operas. Pizzi debuted as an operatic director in 1977 with Don Giovanni in Turin. More opera productions followed, with Pizzi sketching sets and costumes as well.

Pizzi has worked in major houses including La Scala, the Burgtheater in Vienna, the Vienna State Opera, the Paris Opéra, the Royal Opera House at Covent Garden, the Bavarian State Opera in Munich, the Teatro Colón in Buenos Aires, and the Arena di Verona, as well as the opera houses in Florence, Naples, Palermo, Parma, and the Teatro la Fenice in Venice. He has created numerous productions for the Rossini Opera Festival in Pesaro, where he has had a working relationship for several decades.

In 1990, Pizzi opened the new Opéra Bastille in Paris with its production of Les Troyens. In December 2004, he created sets and costumes for Antonio Salieri's L'Europa riconosciuta for the reopening of the renovated La Scala, where he collaborated again after an approximately twenty-year break with director Luca Ronconi.

In October 2005, Pizzi was appointed artistic director of the Sferisterio Opera Festival in Macerata, where he had already worked as a director.

== Works ==
(Unless otherwise noted, Pizzi is responsible for the direction, sets, and costumes.)

- Maria Stuarda (1967, De Lullo directing, Francesco Molinari-Pradelli conducting)
- Carmen (1970, Ronconi directing, Arena di Verona)
- The Bacchae (by Euripides; 1973, Ronconi directing, Burgtheater)
- Die Walküre (1974, Ronconi directing, Wolfgang Sawallisch conducting, La Scala)
- Aida (1974, De Lullo directing, Claudio Abbado conducting, La Scala)
- La forza del destino (1974, Luigi Squarzina directing, Riccardo Muti conducting, Vienna State Opera 1974)
- Così fan tutte (1975, Giuseppe Patroni Griffi directing, Karl Böhm conducting, La Scala)
- Don Giovanni (1977, Turin)
- Les martyrs (1978, Alberto Fassini directing, Gianluigi Gelmetti conducting, Venice)
- Parisina (by Pietro Mascagni; 1978, Gianandrea Gavazzeni conducting, Rome)
- Orlando Furioso (by Antonio Vivaldi; 1978, Claudio Scimone conducting, Verona; plus San Francisco Opera, 1989)
- Fist (1980, Bavarian State Opera)
- Tancredi (1982, Gelmetti directing, Pesaro)
- Mosè in Egitto (1983, Claudio Scimone directing, Pesaro; plus Pesaro 1985 and Rome 1988)
- Hippolyte et Aricie (1983, John Eliot Gardiner conducting, Aix-en-Provence; plus Paris 1985, William Christie conducting)
- L'Orfeo (1984, Florence)
- Alceste (1984, Geneva; plus Paris 1985)
- I Capuleti e i Montecchi (1984, Muti conducting, Covent Garden)
- Rinaldo (1985, Charles Farncombe and Charles Mackerras conducting, Reggio Emilia and Paris, Théâtre du Châtelet; production often revived all around Europe and in Seoul)
- Nel Giorno di Santa Cecilia, festa teatrale by Pier Luigi Pizzi, music by Henry Purcell (1986, Charles Farncombe conducting, Reggio Emilia)
- Bianca e Falliero (1986, Donato Renzetti conducting, Pesaro)
- Alceste (1987, Muti conducting, with Rosalind Plowright, La Scala, Milan)
- Otello (1988, John Pritchard directing, Presaro; plus Chicago 1992)
- Don Carlo (1989, Abbado conducting, Vienna State Opera)
- Les Troyens (1990, Myung-whun Chung conducting, Paris)
- Les Danaïdes (by Salieri; 1990, Claudio Scimone conducting, Ravenna)
- Castor et pollux (1991, Christie conducting, Aix-en-Provence)
- La nascita di Orfeo by Lorenzo Ferrero, 1996, Teatro Filarmonico in Verona
- Aida (1999, Arena di Verona)
- L'Europa riconosciuta (2004, Ronconi directing, Muti conducting, La Scala reopening)
- Euryanthe (2004, Gérard Korsten conducting, Teatro lirico di Cagliari)
- La Gioconda (by Amilcare Ponchielli; 2005, Arena di Verona)
- A Midsummer Night's Dream (2006, Ion Marin conducting, Madrid)
- L'Orfeo (2008, William Christie conducting Les Arts Florissants, Madrid)

== Honours ==
Pizzi is a :

- France : Knight of the Légion d'honneur (a French civilian honor).
- Monaco : Commander of the Order of Cultural Merit (2006)

== Books ==
- Maria Ida Biggi (Hrsg.): Pier Luigi Pizzi alla Fenice. Marsilio 2005. 248 pages, 334 illustrations (color, black and white). (ISBN 88-317-8807-8)
