= Ernesto Palacio =

Peruvian tenor

Ernesto Palacio (born October 19, 1946) is a Peruvian tenor associated with Rossini, Donizetti, and Mozart roles. He is often characterised as a tenore di grazia.

Palacio studied theology and served as the Vice Consul of Peru in Milan before turning to music. While in Milan, he began vocal studies under Vladimiro Badiali and Renato Pastorino. After winning the first prize in the "Voci Nuovi Rossiniane" competition organised by RAI in 1972, he made his debut on radio as Lindoro in L'italiana in Algeri.

He performed across Italy, including at La Scala in Milan and the Teatro di San Carlo in Naples. He also appeared at the Royal Opera House in London, the Aix-en-Provence Festival, as well as venues in North and South America, including the Metropolitan Opera in New York, opera houses in Houston and Dallas, and the Teatro Colón in Buenos Aires.

Palacio appears on a number of recordings, notably in L'italiana in Algeri with Marilyn Horne and Maometto II with June Anderson and Samuel Ramey, both under Claudio Scimone.

In 2024, Palacio was nominated for a Grammy Award in Best Opera Recording, for the album Rossini: L'italiana In Algeri. In recent years, he has worked as a vocal coach and artist manager, notably, mentoring Juan Diego Flórez.
