= Natale de Carolis =

Italian operatic baritone

Natale de Carolis (born 25 July 1957 in Anagni) is an Italian operatic baritone, who has had an active career in major opera houses internationally since the early 1980s. He is particularly associated with the works of Wolfgang Amadeus Mozart and Gioachino Rossini.

Born in Anagni, Carolis studied singing with Renato Guelfi and Maria Vittoria. After winning the Toti dal Monte Singing Competition in Treviso, he made his professional opera debut in 1983 as Don Basilio in Rossini's The Barber of Seville at the Teatro Lirico Sperimentale in Spoleto for the Festival dei Due Mondi. In 1987 he made his debut at La Scala as Masetto in Mozart's Don Giovanni under conductor Riccardo Muti. Natale made his United States debut in 1988 as Figaro in The Marriage of Figaro at the Metropolitan Opera. He has since performed leading roles at the Berlin State Opera, the Cologne Opera, the Frankfurt Opera, the Glyndebourne Festival Opera, the Israeli Opera, La Fenice, the New National Theatre Tokyo, Opera Australia, the Rossini Opera Festival, the Royal Opera House in London, the Teatro Colón, the Teatro Comunale di Bologna, the Teatro Comunale Florence, the Teatro di San Carlo, and the Vienna State Opera among others.
