= Cecilia Gasdia =

Italian operatic soprano (born 1960)

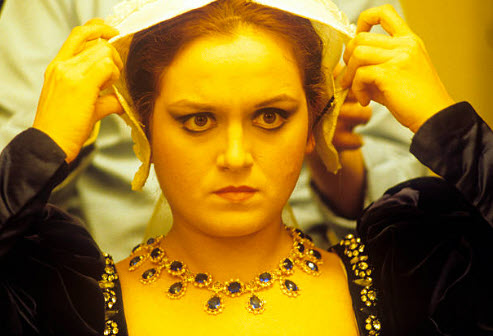
Cecilia Gasdia in Anna Bolena, 1982

Cecilia Gasdia (Italian: [tʃeˈtʃiːlja ɡaˈzdiːa]; born 14 August 1960, Verona) is an Italian operatic soprano.

== Biography ==
Gasdia studied music and piano at the Conservatorio di Verona, graduating in 1980. That same year she won the first prize in the "New Voices for Opera" competition dedicated to Maria Callas. In 1981 she made her operatic debut in Florence as Giulietta in Bellini's I Capuleti e i Montecchi and rose to prominence following her successful debut at La Scala in 1982 when at very short notice she replaced Montserrat Caballé in the title role of Donizetti's Anna Bolena. Following her debut at the Rossini Opera Festival in Pesaro in 1983 she became a well-known singer in Rossini's operas during the 1980s, with 14 different Rossinian roles in her repertoire.

She made her American debut on 5 October 1985 as Gilda in a concert performance of Rigoletto in Philadelphia conducted by Riccardo Muti (repeated on 8 October at Carnegie Hall). In the same year she made her Lyric Opera of Chicago debut as Giulietta in I Capuleti e i Montecchi. John Von Rhein of the Chicago Tribune wrote of her performance:

"With her pale features and petite, high-waisted figure, Gasdia looked as if she had stepped out of a painting by Raphael. She sang with a sweetness, purity and fluency of tone that was rich in soft shadings and consistent in quality from the top to bottom of her range."

Her Metropolitan Opera debut in 1986 as another 'Juliette', this time in Gounod's Roméo et Juliette. By the late 1990s Gasdia increasingly devoted herself to recitals and concerts, including a 2001 US concert tour with Andrea Bocelli. Throughout the course of her career, she has worked with Claudio Scimone and I Solisti Veneti both on the concert stage and in the recording studio. In 2018 she became General Manager and Artistic Director of the opera at the Arena di Verona Festival.

== Sources ==
- Bagnoli, Giorgio, The La Scala Encyclopedia of the Opera: A Complete Reference Guide (translated by Graham Fawcett), Simon & Schuster, 1993, p. 150; ISBN 0-671-87042-4
- Blum, Ronald (March 21, 2001). "Andrea Bocelli Set To Tour U.S." Associated Press. Archived from the original on October 22, 2012 – via HighBeam Research.
- Cummings, David (ed) International Who's Who in Classical Music 2003, Routledge, 2003, p. 268.
- Henahan, Donal, Philadelphia Orchestra Offers 'Rigoletto', The New York Times, 9 October 1985; accessed 14 December 2008.
- Metropolitan Opera Archives Gasdia, Cecilia (Soprano); accessed 14 December 2008.
- Von Rhein, John, "The Great Unknown", Chicago Tribune, 2 March 2008; accessed 14 December 2008.
