= Claudio Scimone =

Italian conductor (1934–2018)

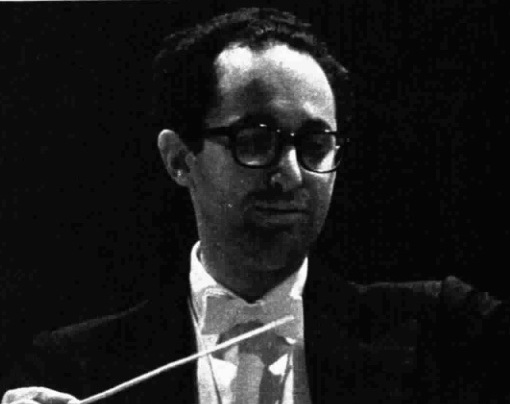
Claudio Scimone

Claudio Scimone (23 December 1934 – 6 September 2018) was an Italian conductor.

He was born in Padua, Italy and studied conducting with Dimitri Mitropoulos and Franco Ferrara. He established an international reputation as a conductor, as well as a composer. He revived many baroque and renaissance works. His discography includes over 150 titles, and he won numerous prizes, including the Grand Prix du Disque of the Académie Charles Cros.

Claudio Scimone was the founder of I Solisti Veneti (the ensemble with which most of his recordings were made) and at the time of his death was the honorary conductor of the Gulbenkian Orchestra in Lisbon, Portugal.

With the Philharmonia of London, he conducted the first recording of Muzio Clementi’s Symphonies.

Scimone led the world to discover the importance of Vivaldi's theatrical works, beginning with the first modern performance of Orlando furioso, featuring Marilyn Horne and Victoria de Los Angeles.

In the reborn Fenice Claudio Scimone directed the first modern revival of the Venetian version of Maometto secondo by Rossini.

He also gave the modern premieres of Moses in Egypt and Edipo a Colono by Rossini, and The Last Judgement by Salieri.

Claudio Scimone was awarded the title of Knight Grand Cross of the Order of Merit of the Italian Republic (the highest ranking honour of the Republic). He was also awarded an honorary law degree from the University of Padua.

Preceded by Juan Pablo Izquierdo	Principal Conductors, Gulbenkian Orchestra; 1979–1986	Succeeded by Muhai Tang
