= List of operas by Gioachino Rossini =

The Italian composer Gioachino Rossini (1792–1868) is best known for his operas, of which he wrote 39 between 1806 and 1829. Adopting the opera buffa style of Domenico Cimarosa and Giovanni Paisiello, Rossini became the dominant composer of Italian opera during the first half of the 19th century. Though working at the same time as Vincenzo Bellini and Gaetano Donizetti, he was recognized by his contemporaries as the greatest Italian composer of his time, an evaluation which has lasted into the 21st century.

The operas are catalogued in a critical edition from the Fondazione Rossini, Pesaro, and published by Casa Ricordi. This edition identifies individual operas by their EC numbers (Edizione critica).

== List of operas ==
Operas by Gioachino Rossini
Title	Genre	Acts	Libretto	Premiere		EC
Title	Genre	Acts	Libretto	Date	Venue	EC
Demetrio e Polibio (composed 1806–1809)	dramma serio	2 acts	Vincenzina Viganò-Mombelli, possibly after Pietro Metastasio	18 May 1812	Teatro Valle, Rome	I/1
La cambiale di matrimonio	farsa comica	1 act	Gaetano Rossi, after Camillo Federici and Giuseppe Checcherini's libretto (1807) for Carlo Coccia	3 November 1810	Teatro San Moisè, Venice	I/2
L'equivoco stravagante	dramma giocoso	2 acts	Gaetano Gasbarri	26 October 1811	Teatro del Corso, Bologna	I/3
L'inganno felice	farsa	1 act	Giuseppe Maria Foppa, after Giuseppe Palomba's libretto (1798) for Giovanni Paisiello	8 January 1812	Teatro San Moisè, Venice	I/4
Ciro in Babilonia , ossia La caduta di Baldassare	dramma con cori	2 acts	Francesco Aventi	14 March 1812	Teatro Comunale, Ferrara	I/5
La scala di seta	farsa comica	1 act	Giuseppe Maria Foppa, after Eugène de Planard's libretto (1808) for Pierre Gaveaux	9 May 1812	Teatro San Moisè, Venice	I/6
La pietra del paragone	melodramma giocoso	2 acts	Luigi Romanelli	26 September 1812	Teatro alla Scala, Milan	I/7
L'occasione fa il ladro , ossia Il cambio della valigia	burletta per musica	1 act	Luigi Prividali, after Eugène Scribe's Le prétendu sans le savoir (1810)	24 November 1812	Teatro San Moisè, Venice	I/8
Il signor Bruschino, ossia Il figlio per azzardo	farsa giocosa	1 act	Giuseppe Maria Foppa, after Le fils par hasard (1809) by René de Chazet and Maurice Ourry	27 January 1813	Teatro San Moisè, Venice	I/9
Tancredi (revised March 1813)	melodramma eroico	2 acts	Gaetano Rossi, after Voltaire; revised by Luigi Lechi	6 February 1813; rev. 21 March 1813	Teatro La Fenice, Venice rev. Ferrara, Teatro Comunale	I/10
L'italiana in Algeri	dramma giocoso	2 acts	Angelo Anelli (Note: Originally written (1808) for Luigi Mosca)	22 May 1813	Teatro San Benedetto, Venice	I/11
Aureliano in Palmira	dramma serio	2 acts	Attributed to Felice Romani, possibly in collaboration with Luigi Romanelli, or Gian Francesco Romanelli (Note: Richard Osborne 2007, p. 216, credits Romani, while Charles Osborne 1994, p. 38, and Weinstock 1987, p. 40, credit Gian Frencesco Romanelli. Libretti d'opera italiani lists Luigi Romanelli as librettist. See Aureliano in Palmira for more details; after Gaetano Sertor)	26 December 1813	Teatro alla Scala, Milan	I/12
Il turco in Italia	dramma buffo	2 acts	Felice Romani, after Caterino Mazzolà's libretto (1788) for Franz Seydelmann	14 August 1814	Teatro alla Scala, Milan	I/13
Sigismondo	dramma	2 acts	Giuseppe Maria Foppa	26 December 1814	Teatro La Fenice, Venice	I/14
Elisabetta, regina d'Inghilterra	dramma	2 acts	Giovanni Schmidt, after Carlo Federici and Sophia Lee	4 October 1815	Teatro di San Carlo, Naples	I/15
Torvaldo e Dorliska	opera semiseria	2 acts	Cesare Sterbini, after Jean-Baptiste de Coudry's Vie et amours du chevalier de Faubles (1790) (Note: Other libretti based on this work such as Claude-François Fillette-Loraux's libretto (1791) for Luigi Cherubini and Francesco Gonella's libretto for (1796) Simon Mayr and Ferdinando Paer)	26 December 1815	Teatro Valle, Rome	I/16
Il barbiere di Siviglia, ossia L'inutile precauzione (initially titled Almaviva)	commedia	2 acts	Cesare Sterbini, after Pierre Beaumarchais and Giuseppe Petrosellini's libretto (1782) for Giovanni Paisiello	20 February 1816	Teatro Argentina, Rome	I/17
La gazzetta, ossia Il matrimonio per concorso	dramma (opera buffa)	2 acts	Giuseppe Palomba (rev. by Andrea Leone Tottola), after Il matrimonio per concorso (1763) by Carlo Goldoni	26 September 1816	Teatro de' Fiorentini, Naples	I/18
Otello, ossia Il Moro di Venezia	dramma	3 acts	Francesco Maria Berio di Salsa, after Othello, ou le More de Venise (1792) by Ducis	4 December 1816	Teatro del Fondo, Naples	I/19
La Cenerentola, ossia La bontà in trionfo	dramma giocoso	2 acts	Jacopo Ferretti, after Cendrillon (1698) by Charles Perrault (Note: Several libretti derived from it such as Charles-Guillaume Étienne's libretto for Nicolas Isouard (1810) and Francesco Fiorini's libretto for Stefano Pavesi's Agatina (1814))	25 January 1817	Teatro Valle, Rome	I/20
La gazza ladra	opera semiseria	2 acts	Giovanni Gherardini, after La Pie voleuse (1815) by Baudouin d'Aubigny and Louis-Charles Caigniez	31 May 1817	Teatro alla Scala, Milan	I/21
Armida	dramma	3 acts	Giovanni Schmidt, after Gerusalemme liberata by Torquato Tasso	11 November 1817	Teatro di San Carlo, Naples	I/22
Adelaide di Borgogna, ossia Ottone, re d'Italia	dramma	2 acts	Giovanni Schmidt	27 December 1817	Teatro Argentina, Rome	I/23
Mosè in Egitto	azione tragico-sacra	3 acts	Andrea Leone Tottola, after L'Osiride (1760) by Francesco Ringhieri	5 March 1818	Teatro di San Carlo, Naples	I/24
Adina, ossia Il califfo di Bagdad (composed 1818)	farsa	1 act	Gherardo Bevilacqua-Aldobrandini (Note: Possibly after Felice Romani's libretto Il Califfo e la schiava for Francesco Basily (1819))	22 June 1826	Teatro Nacional de São Carlos, Lisbon	I/25
Ricciardo e Zoraide	dramma	2 acts	Francesco Maria Berio di Salsa, after the poem Ricciardetto by Niccolò Forteguerri	3 December 1818	Teatro di San Carlo, Naples	I/26
Ermione	azione tragica	2 acts	Andrea Leone Tottola, after Andromaque (1667) by Jean Racine	27 March 1819	Teatro di San Carlo, Naples	I/27
Eduardo e Cristina (sometimes titled Edoardo e Cristina)	dramma	2 acts	Giovanni Schmidt (Note: originally written [1810] for Stefano Pavesi), revised for Rossini by Gherardo Bevilacqua-Aldobrandini and Andrea Leone Tottola)	24 April 1819	Teatro San Benedetto, Venice	I/28
La donna del lago	melodramma	2 acts	Andrea Leone Tottola, after The Lady of the Lake by Sir Walter Scott	24 October 1819	Teatro di San Carlo, Naples	I/29
Bianca e Falliero, ossia Il consiglio dei tre	melodramma	2 acts	Felice Romani, after Blanche et Montcassin by Antoine-Vincent Arnault	26 December 1819	Teatro alla Scala, Milan	I/30
Maometto II (revised December 1822)	dramma	2 acts	Cesare della Valle, possibly after Felice Romani; (Note: The libretto is stated to have been derived from della Valle's own play Anna Erizo (1820) but may have come from Romani's libretto Maometto (1817) for Peter von Winter. Others have erroneously stated Voltaire's Le Fanatisme ou Mahomet le Prophète as a potential source.) revised by Gaetano Rossi	3 December 1820; rev. 26 December 1822	Teatro di San Carlo, Naples rev. Venice, Teatro La Fenice	I/31
Matilde di Shabran, ossia Bellezza e Cuor di Ferro (Note: also titled Matilde Shabran [initially], Bellezza e Cuor di Ferro [Naples, 1821] and Corradino [Milan, also 1821])	opera semiseria	2 acts	Jacopo Ferretti, after François-Benoît Hoffman's libretto Euphrosine, ou Le tyran corrigé (1790) for Étienne Méhul and Jacques-Marie Boutet de Monvel (1798), derived from Voltaire	24 February 1821	Teatro Apollo, Rome	I/32
Zelmira	dramma	2 acts	Andrea Leone Tottola, after Zelmire (1762) by Dormont de Belloy	16 February 1822	Teatro di San Carlo, Naples (Note: The opera was originally intended for performance in Vienna.)	I/33
Semiramide	melodramma tragico	2 acts	Gaetano Rossi, after Voltaire (Note: The libretto may also have been derived from one by Metastasio, which Rossi used for Semiramide riconosciuta by Giacomo Meyerbeer.)	3 February 1823	Teatro La Fenice, Venice	I/34
Ugo, re d'Italia (composed 1823–1824, unfinished)	dramma?	3? acts	Gaetano Rossi?	not performed	intended for London	–
Il viaggio a Reims, ossia L'albergo del Giglio d'Oro	dramma giocoso	3 acts (Note: now usually 1 act)	Luigi Balocchi, after Corinne ou l'Italie by Madame de Staël	19 June 1825	Théâtre Italien, Paris	I/35
Le siège de Corinthe (revision of Maometto secondo)	tragédie lyrique	3 acts	Luigi Balocchi and Alexandre Soumet, after the libretto for Maometto II	9 October 1826	Salle Le Peletier, Paris Opéra	I/36
Moïse et Pharaon, ou Le passage de la mer rouge (revision of Mosè in Egitto)	opéra	4 acts	Luigi Balocchi and Victor-Joseph Étienne de Jouy, after the libretto for Mosè in Egitto	26 March 1827	Salle Le Peletier, Paris Opéra	I/37
Le comte Ory	opéra bouffe	2 acts	Eugène Scribe and Charles-Gaspard Delestre-Poirson	20 August 1828	Salle Le Peletier, Paris Opéra	I/38
Guillaume Tell	opéra	4 acts	Victor-Joseph-Ėtienne de Jouy, Hippolyte-Louis-Florent Bis and Armand Marrast, after Friedrich Schiller (Note: Rossini and Adolphe Crémieux have also been credited for the libretto (Sadie, 2006, p. 270).)	3 August 1829	Salle Le Peletier, Paris Opéra	I/39

== Pasticci with Rossini's permission ==
Title	Genre	Acts	Libretto	Notes	Premiere date	Venue
Ivanhoé	pastiche	3 acts	Emile Deschamps and Gustave de Wailly, after Walter Scott's Ivanhoe	(consists entirely of music taken from earlier Rossini operas by Antonio Pacini)	15 September 1826	Odéon, Paris
Robert Bruce	pastiche	3 acts	Jean-Nicolas van Nieuwenhuysen and Alphonse Royer, after Walter Scott's History of Scotland	(adapted by Louis Niedermeyer from La donna del lago, Zelmira, Bianca e Falliero, Torvaldo e Dorliska and Armida)	30 December 1846	Salle Le Peletier, Paris (Paris Opéra)

== Other pasticci utilising Rossini's music ==
Title	Genre	Acts	Libretto	Notes	Premiere date	Venue
La fausse Agnès, ou Le poète campagnard	pastiche	3 acts	Castil-Blaze after Destouches	(consists of music by Rossini and other composers, including Domenico Cimarosa and Giacomo Meyerbeer)	Before June 1826	Théâtre de Madame, Paris
Le Neveu de Monseigneur	pastiche	2 acts	Jean-François Bayard, Thomas Sauvage and Romieu	(consists of music adapted by Luc Guėnėe from operas by Rossini and other composers, including Giovanni Pacini, Valentino Fioravanti and Francesco Morlacchi)	7 August 1826	Odéon, Paris
Le testament	pastiche	2 acts	Joseph-Henri de Saur and Léonce de Saint-Géniès	(adapted by Jean Frédéric-Auguste Lemierre de Corvey after operas by Rossini)	22 January 1827	Odéon, Paris
M. de Pourceaugnac	pastiche	3 acts	Possibly Castil-Blaze after Molière	(adapted from operas by Rossini and Carl Maria von Weber)	24 February 1827	Odéon, Paris
Cinderella or The Fairy and the Little Glass Slipper	pastiche	2 acts	Michael Rophino Lacy, after Jacopo Ferretti's libretto for La Cenerentola	(adapted from La Cenerentola, Guillaume Tell, Maometto secondo and Armida)	13 April 1830	Covent Garden, London
L'ape musicale	pasticcio	1 act	Lorenzo Da Ponte	(adapted from operas by Rossini, Cimarosa, Wolfgang Amadeus Mozart, Niccolò Antonio Zingarelli and Antonio Salieri)	20 April 1830	Park Theatre, New York (Note: Da Ponte had written the work in 1789 and revised it in 1791, 1792 and 1830. Only the 1830 revision uses Rossini's music.)
Andremo a Parigi?	pastiche	2 acts	Luigi Balocchi and Jean-Henri Dupin	(adapted by Jean-Henri Dupin from Il viaggio a Reims)	26 October 1848 (Note: Stanford University erroneously cites the premiere taking place in 1846.)	Théâtre-Italien, Paris
Un curioso accidente	pastiche	2 acts	Arcangelo Berettoni, after Carlo Goldoni	(adapted by Torribio Calzado from Aureliano in Palmira, La cambiale di matrimonio, La pietra del paragone and L'occasione fa il ladro)	27 November 1859 (Note: Also its only performance)	Théâtre-Italien, Paris

== Notes and references ==
=== Sources ===
- Cagli, Bruno; Gossett, Philip; Zedda, Albert, eds. (1979–2021). Edizione critica delle opere di Gioachino Rossini [Critical edition of the works of Gioachino Rossini]. Pesaro; Milan: Fondazione Rossini; Casa Ricordi. OCLC 14718769.
- Gossett, Philip (2001). "Rossini, Gioachino". Grove Music Online (8th ed.). Oxford University Press. doi:10.1093/gmo/9781561592630.article.23901. ISBN 978-1-56159-263-0. (subscription, Wikilibrary access, or UK public library membership required)
- Osborne, Charles (1994). The Bel Canto Operas of Rossini, Donizetti, and Bellini. Portland, Oregon: Amadeus Press. ISBN 978-0-931340-71-0.
- Osborne, Richard (2007). Rossini: His Life and Works (2nd ed.). Oxford: Oxford University Press. ISBN 978-0-19-518129-6.
- Weinstock, Herbert (1987) [1968]. Rossini: A Biography. Limelight Editions. ISBN 9780879100711.
