= Elisabetta Manfredini-Guarmani =

19th-century Italian opera singer (born 1780)

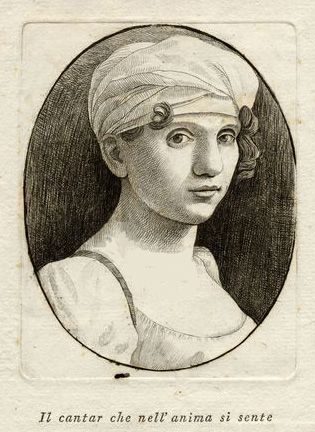
Elisabetta Manfredini-Guarmani

Elisabetta Manfredini-Guarmani (2 June 1780 – after 1828) was an Italian opera singer best known for having created the leading soprano roles in four of Rossini's operas, roles which he wrote specifically for her voice. Antonia Elisabetta Manfredini was born in Bologna and was the daughter of the composer and music theorist Vincenzo Manfredini. After her stage debut in 1810 when she sang in the premiere of Stefano Pavesi's Il trionfo di Gedeone at Bologna's Teatro del Corso, she went on to perform at La Fenice, La Scala, Teatro Regio di Torino, Rome's Teatro Argentina and several other opera houses, primarily in Northern Italy. In addition to the roles she created in Rossini's operas, she also sang in the world premieres of operas by several composers who are lesser known today, including Pietro Raimondi, Simon Mayr, and Ferdinando Paër. Her last known appearance was in 1828, after which there is no further trace of her. The date and place of her death are unknown.

== Early life and first performances ==
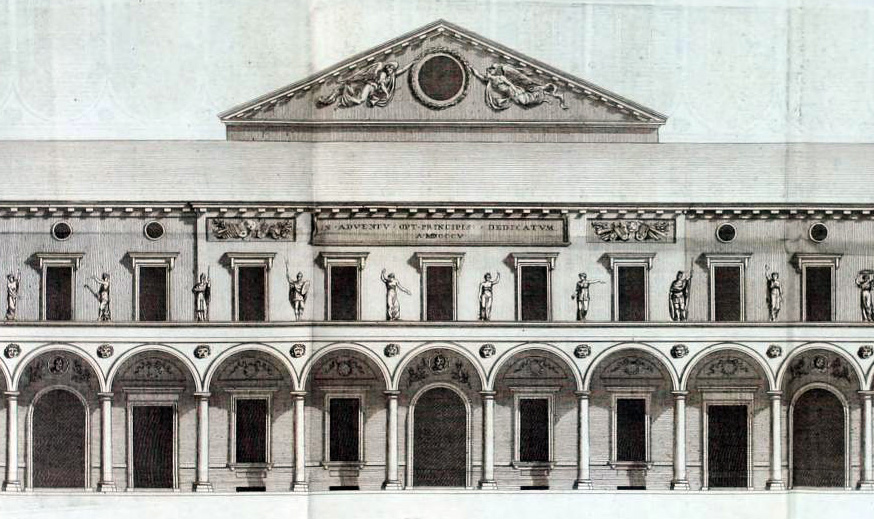
Teatro del Corso in Bologna where Manfredini-Guarmani made her professional debut on 11 March 1810

Manfredini-Guarmani was born in Bologna to a prominent musical family. Her father, Vincenzo Manfredini, was a well-known composer and music theorist who had been active at the Russian court from 1758 until his return to Bologna in 1769. Her mother, Maria Monari, was an Italian opera singer who was performing in Russia at the time of their marriage. The Manfredini family were originally from Pistoia. Vincenzo's father Francesco was a composer, violinist, and church musician, and his older brother Giuseppe was a noted castrato singer who had served the Russian court as a singing teacher during Vincenzo's time there. According to Italian musicologist Leonella Grasso Caprioli, Manfredini-Guarmani's baptismal certificate states her date of birth as 2 June 1780. Earlier sources have variously listed her birth year as 1786 and 1790, although they do not provide the exact day or month. Caprioli has suggested that the assumption of a post-1786 birth year may have been due to her relatively late appearance as a professional singer. Little is known about Manfredini-Guarmani's early life and training. In 1802, three years after her father's death, she married a fellow Bolognese, Vincenzo Antonio Guarmani and as a young woman appears to have been active in the musical life of the city. She sang in private concerts at the home of the composer Francesco Sampieri and by 1811 was already a member of Bologna's Accademia Filarmonica and an honorary member of the Accademia dei Concordi.

She made her professional debut on 11 March 1810 when she sang the role of Egla in the premiere of Stefano Pavesi's sacred opera, Il trionfo di Gedeone (The Triumph of Gideon), at the Teatro del Corso in Bologna. She was 30 years old, and it is unclear why she undertook an opera career at an age when many female singers of the day were already into their second decade on stage. However, Francesco Regli writing in 1860 described her as having come from a "respectable family which had fallen on hard times". Her debut performance received considerable praise, with the critic of Il Redattore del Reno writing:

Signora Elisabetta Manfredini Guarmani, who has appeared for the first time on stage [...] enchants with the grace of her singing, which deeply touches the soul.

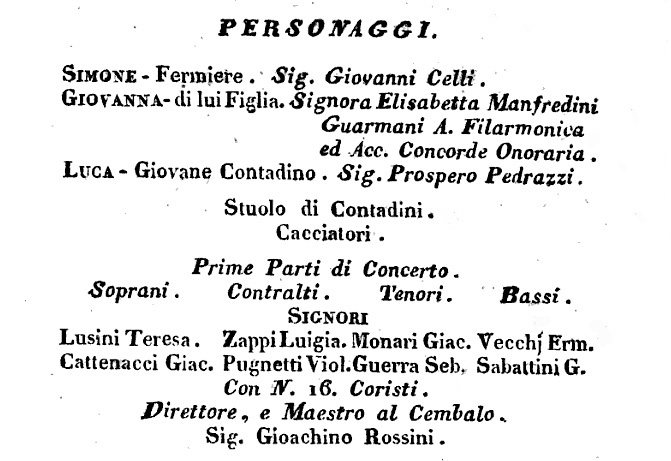
Cast list for the performance of Haydn's The Seasons at the Accademia Filarmonica in Bologna, 10 May 1811

Engagements followed later that year at the Teatro della Pergola in Florence, where she sang the title role in the premiere of Pietro Raimondi's Eloisa Verner, and at the Teatro Grande in Brescia, where she sang Ifigenia in the premiere of Mayr's Il sagrifizio di Ifigenia, a performance which inaugurated the new theatre. In the summer of 1811, she was back in Bologna to sing the title role in a revival of Paisiello's Nina, ossia La pazza per amore at the Teatro Marsigli.

== Singing for Rossini ==
Manfredini-Guarmani first worked with Gioachino Rossini in May 1811, when she sang in Haydn's oratorio The Seasons. The special performance of the oratorio (sung in Italian as Le quattro stagioni) was in celebration of the birth of the Napoleon II two months earlier and was conducted from the harpsichord by Rossini. When Rossini wrote his opera Ciro in Babilonia, he composed the role of Almira specifically for Manfredini-Guarmani's voice. Following its premiere at the Teatro Comunale on Ferrara in 1812, he went on to compose three more operas featuring her in the leading soprano role, Tancredi (1813), Sigismondo (1814), and Adelaide di Borgogna (1817). Adelaide had only a modest success when it premiered at the Teatro Argentina in Rome. The Gazzetta di Bologna reported that the music was not well-suited to her and that her voice had been affected by the fumes of the oil lamps used to light the theatre. Although this was the last Rossini role that she created, she continued to perform in multiple revivals of his other operas until 1824, appearing as Desdemona in Otello, Cristina in Eduardo e Cristina, Zenobia in Aureliano in Palmira, Elcìa in Mosè in Egitto, and the title role in Zelmira. According to Elizabeth Forbes, the music Rossini wrote for her suggests that she had a voice of "exceptional flexibility".

== More premieres and later career ==
Interspersed with her work in Rossini's operas, Manfredini-Guarmani created several roles in operas by other composers who are lesser known today, specialising in what Caprioli calls the "fragile and persecuted" pre-Romantic heroine. Francesco Regli described her as having sung those roles "angelically" with an extremely beautiful and well-schooled voice and clear diction, which made up for a certain lack of warmth in her interpretation.

In 1812, she sang in the premieres of Pavesi's Aspasia e Cleomene at the Teatro della Pergola in Florence and Teodoro at La Fenice in Venice. The Carnival season of 1814 found her at the Teatro Regio in Turin, where she created the roles of Rosanne in Generali's Bajazet and Cleopatra in Ercole Paganini's Cesare in Egitto. In 1815, shortly after appearing in Rossini's Sigismondo at La Fenice, she appeared there in the premiere of Coccia's Euristea o L'amore generoso. Later that year she was engaged by La Scala in Milan, where she created the role of Mandane in Paër's L'eroismo in amore and also sang the title role in a revival of Mayr's Ginevra di Scozia.

Manfredini-Guarmani's acquaintance with the Bolognese aristocrat and composer Francesco Sampieri, pre-dated her professional career. In addition to singing in private concerts at his house, they were both members of Bologna's Accademia Filarmonica and Accademia dei Concordi (founded by Sampieri). A year after her debut, she sang in the premiere of his La nascita del Re di Roma, Bologna's second musical celebration of the birth of the Napoleon II. He also composed a special aria for her which she inserted in her 1816 performances as Briseide in a revival of Paër's Achille at Forlì. She went on to create the title role in Sampieri's Il trionfo di Emilia which premiered in Rome in 1818. Ten years after her stage debut in Bologna, she returned there to sing in a revival of Morlacchi's Le Danaidi at the Teatro Contavalli. The performance on 28 November 1820 was a benefit for her, and she additionally performed a scene from Il trionfo di Emilia between the first and second acts of Le Danaidi.

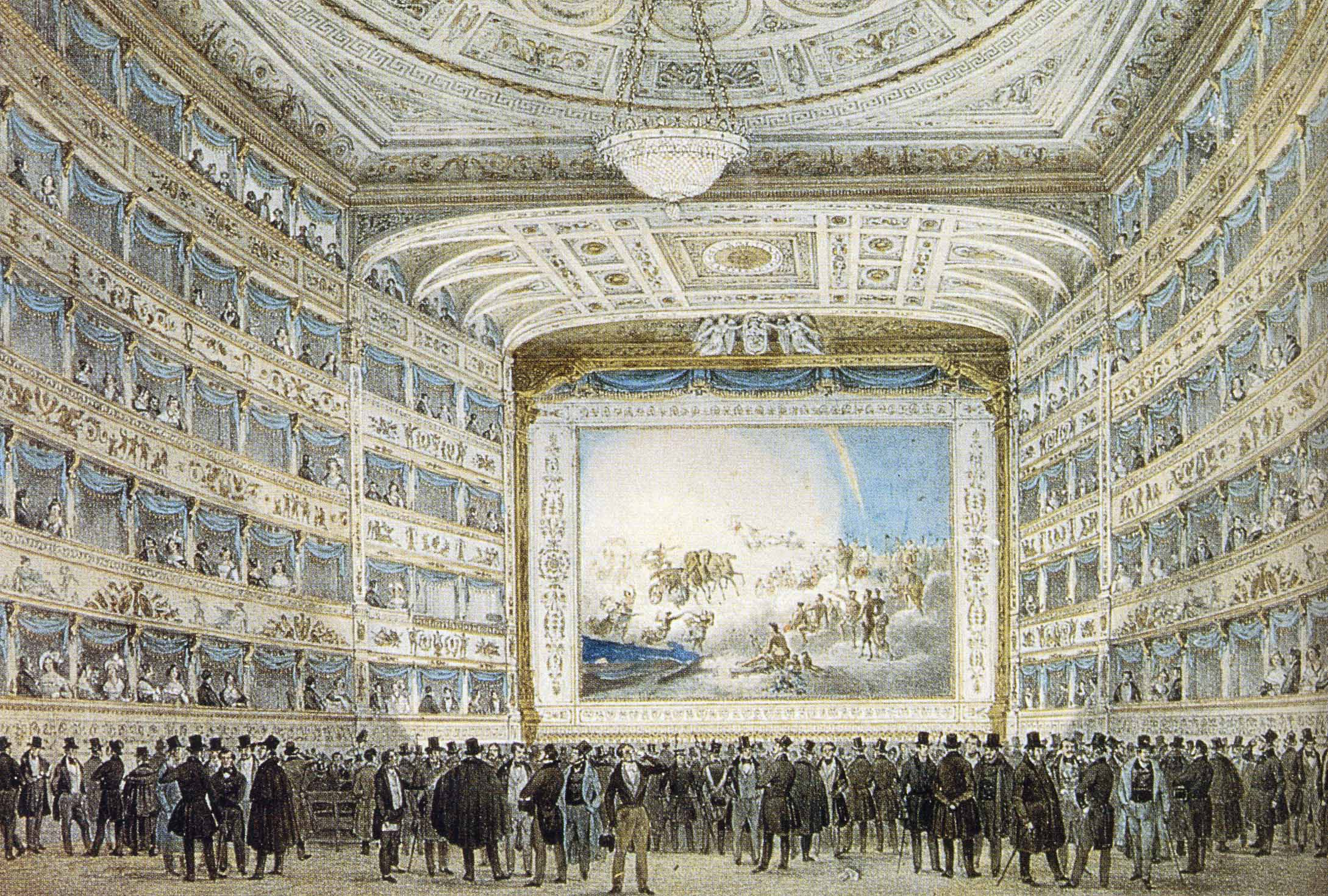
Teatro La Fenice in Venice, where Manfredini-Guarmani sang in the world premieres of Rossini's Sigismondo and Tancredi, Pavesi's Teodoro, and Coccia's Euristea

In her later career, she no longer created new roles, but continued to sing leading soprano roles in operas already in the repertory. In addition to her appearances in revivals of Rossini's operas, she sang the title role in Mayr's Medea in Corinto several times as well as Clotilde in his La rosa bianca e la rosa rossa. The critic in Teatri, arti e letteratura wrote of her 27 December 1828 performance in La rosa bianca e la rosa rossa at Rimini:

Signora Elisa Manfredini a distinguished singer, performed the prima donna role to great applause. Both her accomplished singing and her noble stage presence make her worthy of the unanimous praise she receives.

She was 48 at the time. After the Rimini appearance, there is no further trace of her. The date and place of her death are unknown.

== Roles created ==
Elisabetta Manfredini-Guarmani is known to have sung in the world premieres of the following works:

- Egla in Pavesi's Il trionfo di Gedeone (Teatro del Corso, Bologna, 11 March 1810)
- Eloisa in Raimondi's Eloisa Verner (Teatro della Pergola, Florence, Autumn 1810)
- Ifigenia in Mayr's Il sagrifizio di Ifigenia (Teatro Grande, Brescia, 26 December 1810)
- Minerva in Sampieri's La nascita del Re di Roma (Società del Casino, Bologna 5 July 1811)
- Almira in Rossini's Ciro in Babilonia (Teatro Comunale, Ferrara, 14 March 1812)
- Aspasia in Pavesi's Aspasia e Cleomene (Teatro della Pergola, Florence, Autumn 1812)
- Anaide in Pavesi's Teodoro (La Fenice, Venice, 26 December 1812)
- Amenaide in Rossini's Tancredi (La Fenice, Venice, 6 February 1813)
- Rosanne in Generali's Bajazet (Teatro Regio, Turin, 26 December 1813)
- Cleopatra in Ercole Paganini's Cesare in Egitto (Teatro Regio, Turin, 22 January 1814)
- Aldimira in Rossini's Sigismondo (La Fenice, Venice, 26 December 1814)
- Euristea in Coccia's Euristea o L'amore generoso (La Fenice, Venice, 21 January 1815)
- Mandane in Paër's L'eroismo in amore (La Scala, Milan, 26 December 1815)
- Amor della patria in Mayr's Egeria (Teatro Grande, Bescia, in the presence of Emperor Francis I of Austria, 1816)
- Adelaide in Rossini's Adelaide di Borgogna (Teatro Argentina, Rome, 27 December 1817)
- Emilia in Sampieri's Il trionfo di Emilia (Teatro Argentina, Rome, 19 January 1818)
