= Bruce Fowler (tenor) =

American classical tenor

Bruce Fowler (born 1965) is an American classical tenor who has had a major international performance career in operas and concerts since the early 1990s. He is known for his appearances in bel canto operas. His first recording, as the tenor soloist for Handel's Messiah with Telarc, was nominated for a Grammy Award. He has also recorded Gioachino Rossini's Stabat Mater for Harmonia Mundi, Rossini's Armida for Sony, Jacques Ibert's Angelique for Fonit Cetra, Georg Philipp Telemann's Der Tag des Gerichts and Hugo Weisgall's Six Characters in Search of an Author on New World Records.

Born in West Monroe, Louisiana, where he graduated from West Monroe High School, Fowler studied at Oklahoma Baptist University in Shawnee, Oklahoma, where he earned bachelor's degrees in both voice and church music. He did post-baccalaureate studies at the University of Houston and earned a master's degree in vocal performance (opera) from the University of North Texas in Denton, before becoming a member of the young artist program at the Lyric Opera of Chicago. He made his stage debut with that company as Évandre in Christoph Willibald Gluck's Alceste with Jessye Norman in 1990.

In the 1993-1994 season, Fowler appeared as Carlo in Gioachino Rossini's Armida at the Rossini Opera Festival in Pesaro, Italy with Renée Fleming in the title role, Ferrando in Così fan tutte at the Teatro Massimo Bellini in Catania, Lindoro in L'italiana in Algeri at the Cleveland Opera, and performed the role of Tonio in La fille du régiment with Opéra de Montréal.

In 1994, Fowler won first prize at the Operalia, The World Opera Competition. He went on to win several other competitions, including the Baltimore Opera International Vocal Competition, the Liederkranz Foundation competition, the Maguerite McCammon Award, and grants from the Sullivan Foundation.

In 1995-1996, Fowler sang Edward Milfort in La cambiale di matrimonio at the Rossini Opera Festival in Pesaro, Italy, Don Narciso in Il turco in Italia at the Teatro Comunale di Bologna and portrayed both Count Almaviva in The Barber of Seville and Prunier in La rondine with the Bonn Opera. Over the next several years, he made debuts at the New York City Opera (as Fenton in Falstaff), the Teatro de la Maestranza in Seville (as Count Almaviva), Teatro dell'Opera di Roma (as Count Almaviva), Opéra de Nice (as Ramiro in La Cenerentola), the Semperoper (as Ramiro), the Teatro Carlo Felice (as Lindoro), and in Il turco in Italia at La Scala (under the baton of Riccardo Chailly).

In 1999, Fowler appeared at the Finnish National Opera as Sir Riccardo Percy in Anna Bolena. In 2000, he made his debut at the Deutsche Oper Berlin as Lindoro in L'italiana in Algeri. Since then he has made appearances at the Opéra National de Paris, Berlin State Opera, the Salzburg Festival, Hamburg State Opera, Glimmerglass Opera, Michigan Opera Theater, Minnesota Opera, Opéra du Québec, Palm Beach Opera, the San Diego Opera and West Australian Opera, among many others.

He has performed concerts and recitals worldwide including appearances with the Vienna Philharmonic, the Akademie für Alte Musik in Berlin, the Opera Orchestra of New York, the Houston Symphony, Les musiciens du Louvre-Grenoble in Paris, the Mittel-Deutsche Rundfunks Orchester in Leipzig, Orchestra of Saint Luke's and the Mozarteum Orchestra in venues that include Carnegie Hall, Lyric Opera of Chicago, the Caramoor Festival, Orchestra Hall Chicago and the Palais des Beaux Arts in Brussels.Brussels.

He is a voice professor, with current and former students performing at the Metropolitan Opera, Wiener Staatsoper, Santa Fe Opera, Semper Oper Dresden, Seattle Opera; students and have won the Metropolitan Opera National Council Auditions Finals and the Gerda Lissner Competition.

Formerly teaching at the University of Oklahoma and having spent part of his summers as voice professor and stage director with the Franco American Vocal Academy in Salzburg, Austria, in 2013, he established a private studio for teaching.
