= Il signor Bruschino =

Opera by Gioachino Rossini

- Farsa by Gioachino Rossini
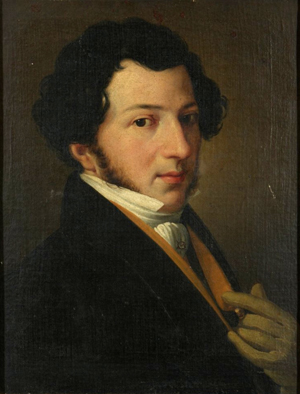
- Rossini c. 1815
- Librettist: Giuseppe Maria Foppa
- Language: Italian
- Based on: Le fils par hasard, ou ruse et folie by René de Chazet and Maurice Ourry
- Premiere: 27 January 1813; Teatro San Moisè, Venice

Il signor Bruschino, ossia Il figlio per azzardo (Signor Bruschino, or The Accidental Son) is a one act operatic farce (farsa giocosa per musica) by Gioachino Rossini to a libretto by Giuseppe Maria Foppa, based upon the 1809 play Le fils par hasard, ou ruse et folie by René de Chazet and Maurice Ourry. The opera was first performed in Venice at the Teatro San Moisè on 27 January 1813.

Between 1810 and 1813, the young Rossini composed five pieces for the Teatro San Moisè, beginning with La cambiale di matrimonio (Bill of Exchange of Marriage), his first opera, and ending with Il signor Bruschino. These farse were short pieces, popular in Venice at the end of the 18th century and the beginning of the 19th century. They were intimate, with a cast of five to eight singers, always including a pair of lovers, here Sofia and Florville, at least two comic parts, here Bruschino senior, Gaudenzio and Filiberto, and one or more minor roles, here Marianna, Bruschino junior and a policeman. The style called for much visual comedy improvised by the players, and often a compulsive linguistic ‘tic’. Here, Bruschino senior often repeats the phrase "Oh, it’s so hot!". As compared with many genres of opera, acting and comedic talent is more important relative to the required singing ability. Rossini's farces also have a significant sentimental element. Overall, it has been described as "a vivacious and fast-moving musical comedy, whose graceful score reveals traces still of Cimarosa and even Mozart."

Il signor Bruschino is forward-looking in its use of new musical effects. For example, in the overture, the second violins are instructed to tap their bows on their music stands. This lighthearted, energetic overture is one of several by Rossini to have gained considerable importance in the modern concert repertoire.

== Performance history ==
The opera was not performed in North America or in Britain until the 20th century. Its New York premiere took place at the Metropolitan Opera on 9 December, 1932, and it was first seen in England (in an amateur staging by the Kent Opera Group) on 14 July, 1960. Other performances have taken place in Italy and elsewhere in Europe, in particular, stagings in Paris and Macerata in 1992.

== Roles ==
Role	Voice type	Premiere Cast, 27 January 1813 (Conductor: - )
Gaudenzio, a tutor and Sofia's guardian	bass	Nicola De Grecis
Sofia	soprano	Teodolinda Pontiggia
Bruschino senior	bass	Luigi Raffanelli
Bruschino junior	tenor	Gaetano Dal Monte
Florville, Sofia's lover	tenor	Tommaso Berti
Filiberto, an innkeeper	bass	Nicola Tacci
Marianna, a maidservant	soprano	Carolina Nagher
A Police Commissioner	tenor	Gaetano Dal Monte
Servants	silent	

== Synopsis ==
Time: 18th Century
Place: Gaudenzio's castle in France.

Sofia and Florville are in love, but Sofia's guardian, Gaudenzio, opposes the match. Florville's father and Gaudenzio are old enemies. Florville's father dies, removing one barrier, but Gaudenzio has already agreed to wed Sofia to the son of his old friend, Signor Bruschino senior. Sofia has never met her fiancé, Bruschino junior, as they were betrothed by correspondence. On his way to meet Sofia, young Bruschino stops at a tavern, runs up an impressive bill and is detained when he is unable to pay. Seizing the opportunity, Florville pretends to be Bruschino junior so that he can marry Sofia. Complications arise when Bruschino senior arrives at Gaudenzio's house. Fortunately, however, he is eventually forced to accept Florville as his own son. In a playful trio, Florville (as Bruschino junior) begs his "father" for forgiveness, while Gaudenzio upbraids old Bruschino for his lack of fatherly sympathy.

== Musical numbers ==
- Sinfonia
- "Deh! tu m'assisti amore"
- Duettino - "Marianna!... Voi signore?"
- "Quanto è dolce a un'alma amante"
- "A voi lieto ritorno, cara Sofia"
- "Ah se il colpo arrivo a fare"
- "A noi su, trasformiamoci"
- "Nel teatro del gran mondo"
- "Lasciatemi... che violenza!..."
- "Per un figlio gia pentito"
- "Impaziente son io di Saper"
- "Ah, voi condur volete... Ah, donate il caro sposo"
- "Qui convien finirla"
- "Ho la testa, o e andata via?"
- "Va tutto ben"
- "E bel nodo, che due cori"
- "Ebben, ragion, dovere"
- "E tornato Filiberto"

== Recordings ==
Year	Cast: Gaudenzio, Sofia, Bruschino padre, Marianna, Florville	Conductor, Opera House and Orchestra	Label
1991	Samuel Ramey, Kathleen Battle, Claudio Desderi, Jennifer Larmore, Frank Lopardo	Ion Marin, English Chamber Orchestra (Recorded in the Henry Wood Hall, London, May)	Audio CD: DG; Cat: 477 5668 & 000875102
1988	Bruno Praticò, Patrizia Orciani, Natale de Carolis, Katia Lytting, Luca Canonici	Marcello Viotti, Orchestra dei Filarmonici di Torino	Audio CD: Claves CD 50-8904/05 (reissued on Brilliant Classics)
2000	Gianpiero Ruggeri, Hiroko Kouda, Ezio Maria Tisi, Claudia Schneider, Patrizio Saudelli	Gustav Kuhn, Orchester der Tiroler Festspiele Erl	Audio CD: Arte Nova Classics Cat: 74321 80783 2 OCLC 1115263344
