= Sigismondo =

Opera by Gioachino Rossini

- Opera by Gioachino Rossini
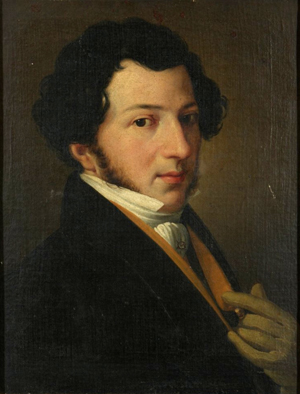
- Rossini c. 1815
- Librettist: Giuseppe Maria Foppa
- Language: Italian
- Premiere: 26 December 1814; La Fenice, Venice

Sigismondo is an operatic 'dramma' in two acts by Gioachino Rossini to an Italian libretto by Giuseppe Maria Foppa.

The opera was not a success and Rossini later re-used some of its music in Elisabetta, regina d'Inghilterra, The Barber of Seville, and Adina.

== Performance history ==
Sigismondo was first performed at the Teatro La Fenice, Venice, on 26 December 1814, with revivals in Cremona, Reggio Emilia, Padua and Senigallia (all in 1819), Florence and Siena (both in 1820) and finally in Bologna (1827).

Its modern revival took place in Rovigo in 1992 (see recording details below).

== Synopsis ==
Time: 16th Century
Place: Poland

== Roles ==
Role	Voice type	Premiere Cast, 26 December 1814 (Conductor: )
Sigismondo, King of Poland	contralto	Marietta Marcolini
Ladislao, Prime Minister of Poland	tenor	Claudio Bonoldi
Anagilda, sister of Ladislao	soprano	Marianna Rossi
Radoski, confidant of Ladislao	tenor	Domenico Bartoli
Ulderico, King of Bohemia	bass	Luciano Bianchi
Aldimira, daughter of Ulderico and wife of Sigismondo	soprano	Elisabetta Manfredini-Guarmani
Zenovito, Polish noble	bass	Luciano Bianchi

== Recordings ==
Year	Cast: Sigismondo, Ladislao, Aldimira, Ulderico	Conductor, Opera House and Orchestra	Label
1992	Sonia Ganassi, Bruno Lazzaretti, Rosella Ragatzu, Giacomo Prestia	Richard Bonynge, Rovigo Venezze Conservatory Orchestra	Audio CD: Bongiovanni; Cat: 8.660189-90
2017	Margarita Gritskova, Kenneth Tarver, Maria Aleida, Marcell Bakonyi	Antonino Fogliani, Virtuosi Brunensis, Recorded live at the Rossini in Wildbad Festival	CD Naxos Records; Cat:8.660403-04
2019	Marianna Pizzolato, Kenneth Tarver, Hera Hyesang Park, Il Hong	Keri-Lynn Wilson, Münchner Rundfunkorchester, Chor des Bayerischen Rundfunks	CD BR Klassik; Cat:900327
