= Emma di Resburgo =

Opera in two acts by Giacomo Meyerbeer

- Opera by Giacomo Meyerbeer
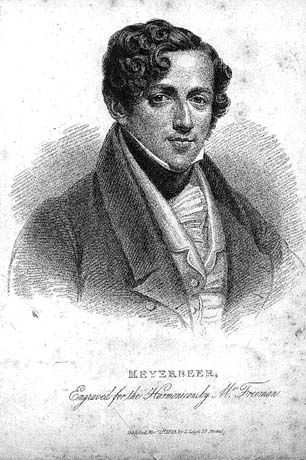
- Giacomo Meyerbeer, c. 1825
- Librettist: Gaetano Rossi
- Language: Italian
- Premiere: 26 June 1819; Teatro San Benedetto, Venice

Emma di Resburgo (Emma of Roxburgh) is a melodramma eroico (a heroic, serious opera) in two acts by Giacomo Meyerbeer. It was the composer's sixth opera and the third that he wrote for an Italian theatre. The libretto in Italian by Gaetano Rossi is set in Scotland and has the same storyline as previous operas by Étienne Méhul (Héléna, Paris, 1803, to a French text) and Simon Mayr (Elena, Naples, 1814, with an Italian text). Meyerbeer's opera had its premiere at the Teatro San Benedetto in Venice on 26 June 1819.

== Background ==
Born in Berlin to a wealthy family, as a young man Giacomo Meyerbeer had musical ambitions and studied and traveled in Italy. Much impressed and influenced by the leading Italian composer of operas of the day, Rossini, Meyerbeer composed an opera in the style of that composer, Romilda e Costanza, which was produced in Padua in 1817. Through the support of a star singer of the day, Carolina Bassi, Meyerbeer had the opportunity to compose an opera for Turin, which became his second opera for Italy, Semiramide riconosciuta. Both of these operas being successful with Italian audiences, Meyerbeer presented a third Italian opera in Venice. Although the previous operas which had used the same storyline had been set in Provence, the librettist Rossi and Meyerbeer moved the setting to Scotland, where the novels of Walter Scott, popular in continental Europe as well as Britain, had been set, thus producing one of the first Italian Romantic operas to feature a Scottish setting, followed by Rossini's La Donna del Lago, which had its premiere only three months after Emma di Resburgo. Meyerbeer had modeled his Italian operas after those of Rossini, and he became acquainted with Rossini through the success of Emma di Resburgo. The two composers became close friends, a relationship that continued later when they were both enjoying great success in Paris.

== Roles ==
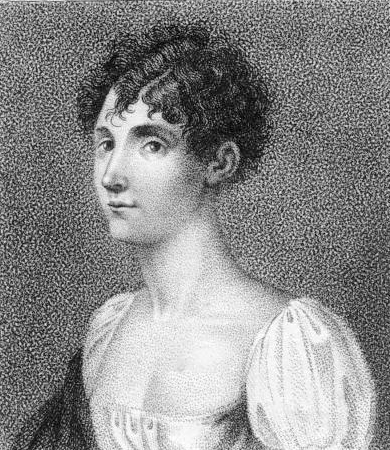
Rosa Morandi, who created the role of Emma, by Giovanni Antonio Sasso

Roles, voice types, and premiere cast
Role	Voice type	Premiere cast,26 June 1819 (Conductor: Giacomo Meyerbeer)
Edemondo	alto	Carolina Cortesi
Emma	soprano	Rosa Morandi
Norcesto	tenor	Eliodoro Bianchi
Olfredo	bass	Luciano Bianchi
Donaldo	tenor	Vincenzo Fracalini
Etelia	soprano	Cecilia Gaddi

== Synopsis ==
Scene: Scotland, about 1070

=== Act 1 ===
Countryside near the entrance of the castle of Tura, on the Clyde

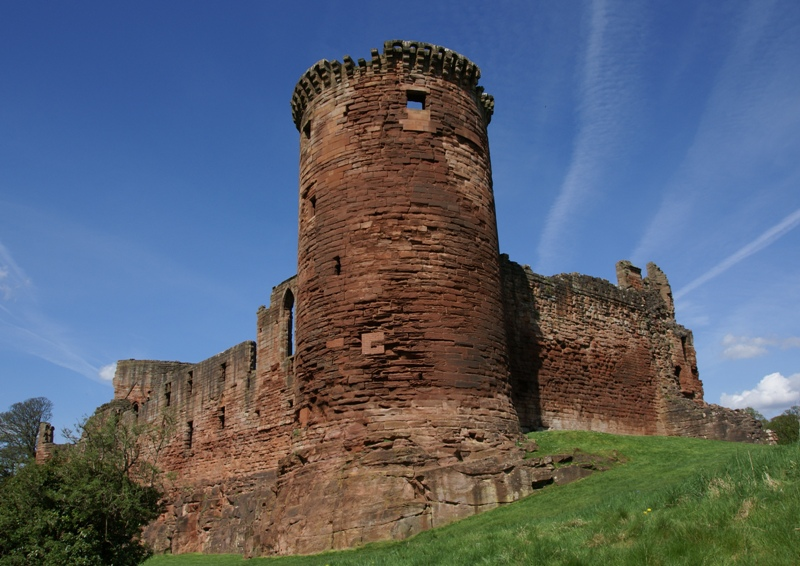
Photo of the south-east tower of Bothwell Castle, Lanarkshire, on the banks of the River Clyde, Scotland.

Olfredo, lord of the castle of Tura, Etelia his daughter and the shepherds of the estate sing of their happiness, living as they do in peace. These pastoral festivities are however interrupted by the arrival of the Earl of Lanark, Norcesto. A herald then proclaims that it is forbidden to grant asylum to Edemondo, who forfeited the title of Earl of Lanark and has been on the run since he was accused of murdering his father. Olfredo, who does not seem convinced of the guilt of Edemondo, then reminds Norcesto of the circumstances in which the Earl of Lanark was murdered. Edemondo was discovered by his father's bloody corpse, holding a dagger. His insistence that he had not murdered his father did not convince others. After he was accused of the crime Edemondo disappeared, as did his wife, Emma, and their son. Norcesto's father then took the title of the Earl of Lanark and upon his death Norcesto inherited the title. Norcesto seems to dislike being reminded of these events, and goes into the castle. Then a wandering bard appears and is welcomed by Olfredo. This is really Emma in disguise, who has resorted to this device in order to be near her son, Elvino. The boy has been sheltered in the castle by Olfredo, unknown to all but himself and Emma, since both his parents fled. Olfredo assures Emma that he will protect her and her son. A poor shepherd arrives at the castle: it is Edemondo, who, tired of his fugitive life, has returned in disguise to try to find his wife and son. He is joyously recognised by Emma and Olfredo.

Great hall of the castle of Tura decorated for a party given in honour of Olfredo

Olfredo brings Edemondo to his son Elvino, while Emma and the villagers celebrate the goodness of Olfredo. Norcesto arrives to the festivities; Edemondo and Emma immediately hide in the crowd. Upon seeing Elvino, Norcesto is amazed at the likeness of the child to Edemondo. He requires Olfredo to give him information about the boy. Norcesto no longer doubts the identity of the child's father. He orders his guards to seize the boy. Unable to do more, Emma intervenes and reveals her identity. She is taken prisoner in turn while Olfredo has the greatest difficulty in restraining Edemondo who wants to defend his son and his wife.

=== Act 2 ===
A gallery in the Palace of the Count of Lanark, Glasgow

Donaldo, a knight, reports to Norcesto that attempts to regain Edemondo have been unsuccessful. Very troubled, Norcesto orders that the imprisoned Emma be treated with dignity. Olfredo then arrives with his daughter and Norcesto has Emma brought in. She bitterly reproaches him for separating her from her son, to which Norcesto offers to reunite them if Emma will reveal the whereabouts of Edemondo. Emma refuses. The palace is stormed by Knights and villagers who have heard that Edemondo is in the vicinity and demand he be brought to justice for the murder of his father. Edemondo appears and reveals his identity to the crowd, protesting his innocence. This only infuriates the crowd the more, who insist he be put to death.

The Hall of Justice in the Palace

The judges come to deliver their verdict. : Edemondo is sentenced to death for the murder of his father. The execution is ordered to take place on his father's grave. However Norcesto seems reluctant to sign the execution order. Emma, shocked by the verdict, publicly accuses Norcesto of being the murderer. Embarrassed, Norcesto eventually denies being the author of this crime and signs the execution order.

The dungeon of the palace

Olfredo and Etelia his daughter visit Edemondo in the prison where he is awaiting execution. Olfredo feels that Norcesto is hiding a secret that appears to be tormenting him.

The cemetery where the counts of Lanark are buried at sunrise

Emma arrives at the monument on the grave of her husband's father. In despair at Edemondo's impending execution, she feels she will not long survive him. A funeral march with chorus is heard and the procession moves onto the stage. Guards and Knights lead Edemondo to the block. Emma throws herself into his arms and takes a last farewell. Norcesto arrives with Olfredo and Etelia at the last moment before the execution. Norcesto, disturbed by pangs of conscience, has decided to reveal the truth. It was his father who murdered Edemondo's father, and as proof Norcesto produces the deathbed confession his father signed and gave to him. Edemondo, Emma and their son are reunited, Edemondo regains his title of Earl of Lanark and all rejoice that justice has finally been done.

== Reception and performance history ==
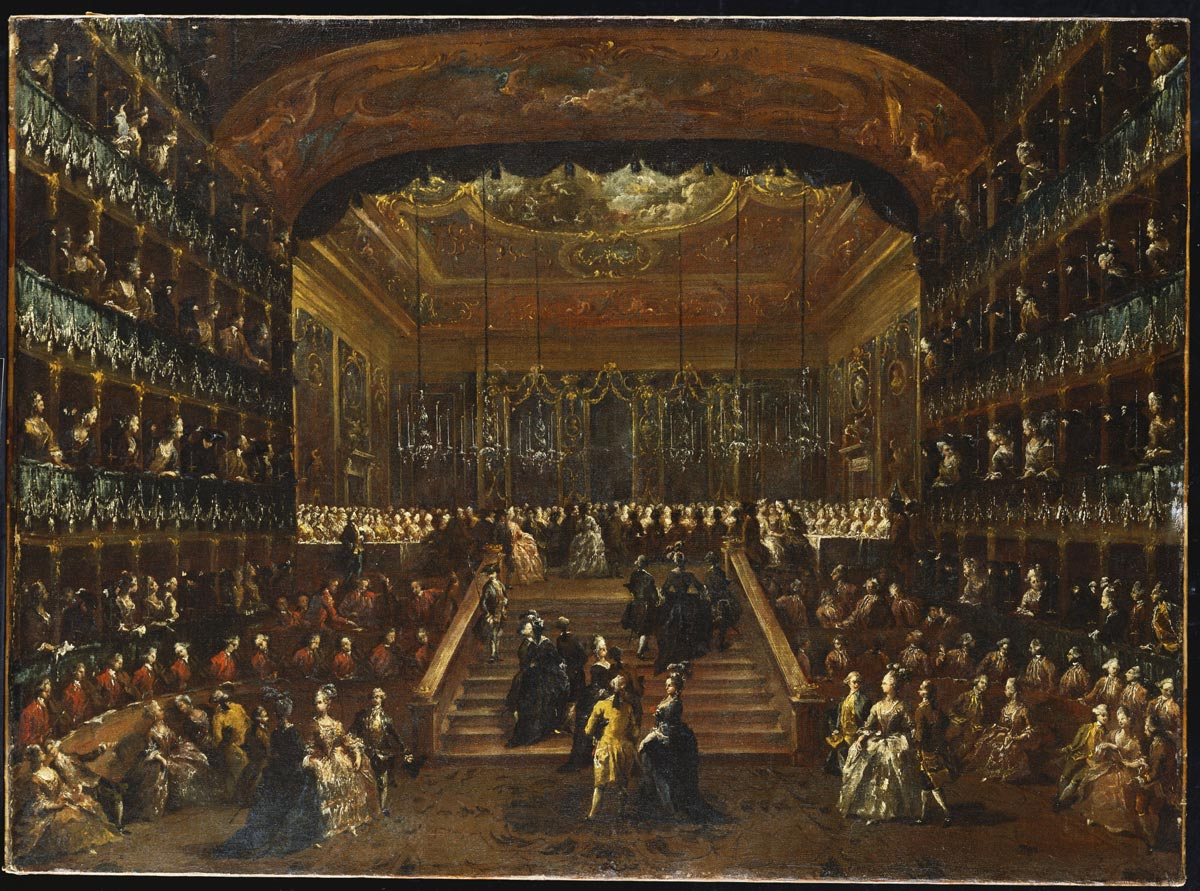
Ball in 1782 in the Teatro San Benedetto, Venice, where Emma di Resburgo had its first performance. By Francesco Guardi

The opera was received with great enthusiasm at its premiere and given 73 further performances. Italian audiences and critics were flattered that a German composer would come to Italy and compose operas in a thoroughly Italian style. Within a few years it received further performances not only in Italian opera houses but, with a text translated into German, in Dresden, London, Vienna, Munich, Berlin, and other European centres. It was the first of Meyerbeer's operas to be published. After Meyerbeer's lifetime the opera went unperformed for many years until a concert performance in Vienna in 2010, which was recorded.

== Musical features ==
The opera is darker and more intensely dramatic than Meyerbeer's previous works. Impressive and monumental choral scenes such as the Chorus of Judges and funeral march in the last act are a feature of the work. Among solo arias, the final aria for the heroine Emma (Il dì cadrà) with cors anglais, flutes, clarinets and horns, is especially notable.

== Recording ==
Recorded in 2010

Edemondo- Vivica Genaux
Emma - Simone Kermes
Norcesto - Thomas Walker
Olfredo - Manfred Hemm
Donaldo - Martin Vanberg
Etelia - Lena Belkina
Wiener Singakademie moderntimes 1800, orchestra and chorus
Conductor: Andreas Stoehr
Newplay Entertainment NE003 (2 CD)
