= Mykhailo Zherbin =

Mykhailo Zherbin (Жербін Михайло Михайлович 24 December 1911 – 2004) was a Ukrainian composer and engineer.

== Recordings ==
- Mykhailo Zherbin: songs: Vocalise-Prelude, Plyve moya dusha, Ostanni kvity Lena Belkina, Violina Petrychenko
