= Philibert Rozet =

Louis Philibert Rozet (died 11 April 1853) was a French playwright of the 19th century.

His plays were performed on the most important Parisian stages of the 19th century: Théâtre de la Porte Saint-Martin, Théâtre des Variétés, Théâtre du Palais-Royal, Théâtre du Vaudeville etc.

== Works ==
- 1779: Lamentine, ou les Tapouis, comi-tragic play in 2 acts and in verses, with Auguste-Étienne-Xavier Poisson de La Chabeaussière
- 1800: Arlequin portier, comedy-parade in 1 act mingled with vaudevilles, with Joseph Marty
- 1801: Colombine toute seule, scène-parade, mingled with vaudevilles, with Marty and Étienne Morel de Chédeville
- 1801: Jacasset ou, La contrainte par corps, comedy in 1 act
- 1810: Le Monde renversé, vaudeville in 1 act
- 1811: Les petits caquets, explanatory prologue of La sœur de la Miséricorde, in 1 act and in vaudevilles, with H. Simon
- 1811: Les Sabines de Limoges, ou l'Enlèvement singulier, vaudeville héroïque in 1 act, with Maurice Ourry and H. Simon
- 1816: Cadet Roussel dans l'île des Amazones,
- 1816: Le Bateau à vapeur, comedy in 1 act, mingled with couplets, with Henri Simon and Pierre Carmouche
- 181: M. Descroquignoles, ou le Bal bourgeois, comedy-foly in 1 act, mingled with couplets, with H. Simon, 1816
- 1820: Le Docteur Quinquina, ou le Poirier ensorcelé, foly-vaudeville in 1 acte, with Gabriel de Lurieu
- 1821: Le Pâris de Surêne ou La clause du testament, vaudeville in 1 act, with de Lurieu
- 1822: Les Tailleurs de Windsor, ou l'Acteur en voyage, comedy-vaudeville in 1 act, with de Lurieu
