= Giuseppe Mosca =

Italian opera composer

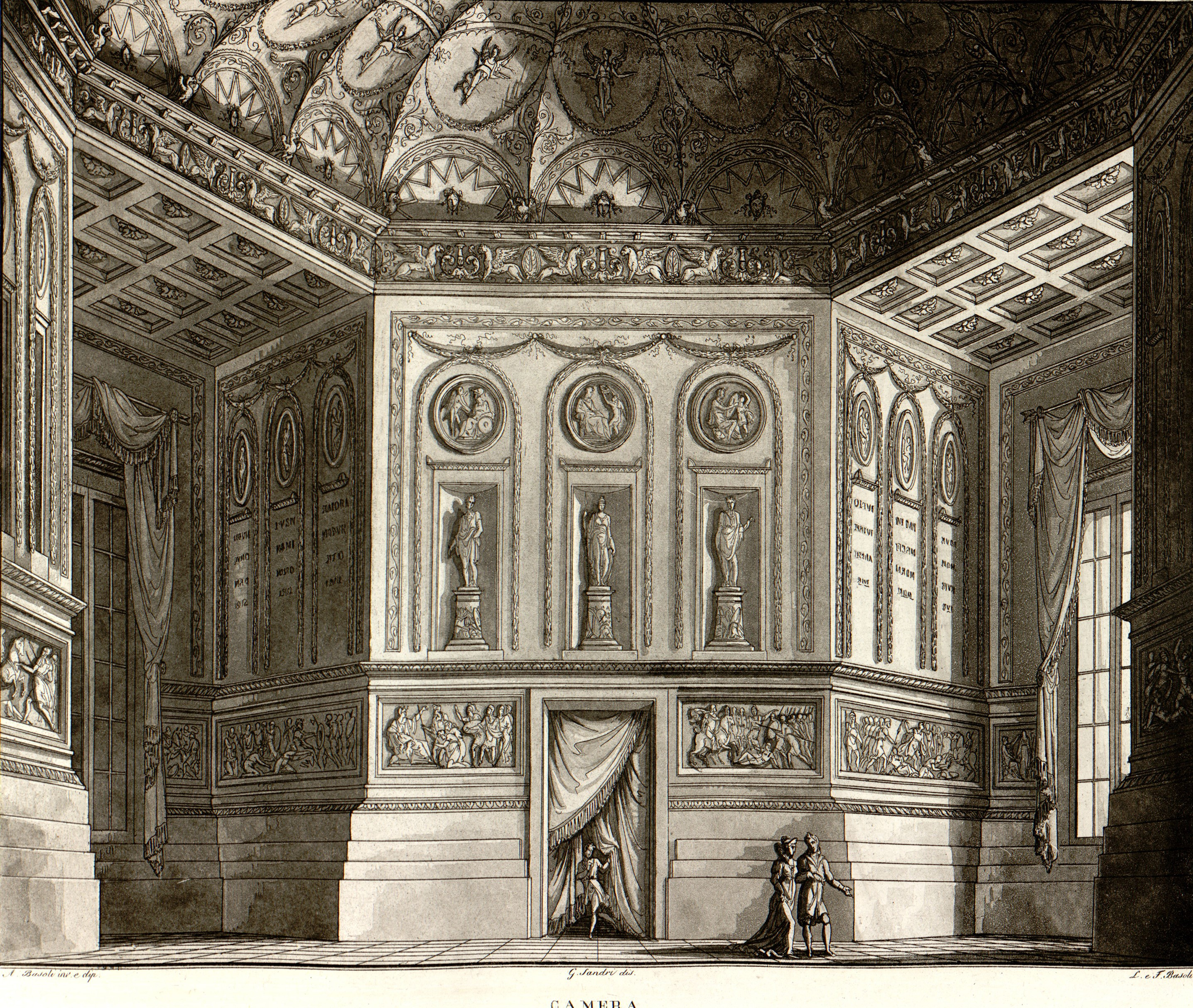
Set design for Amori all'Armi (Milan 1813)

Giuseppe Mosca (1772 in Naples – 1839 in Messina) was an Italian opera composer, the older brother of Luigi Mosca, also an opera composer. He is mainly remembered as the composer who said that Rossini copied in La pietra del paragone the "crescendo" from his opera I pretendenti delusi.

== Works ==
- aria "Mentre guardo, oh Dio! me stessa" from the opera Le bestie in uomini Ann Hallenberg, Fabio Biondi 2012
