= Francesco Albanese =

Italian opera singer (1912–2005)

- Photo with 1948 dedication
- Born: 13 August 1912; Torre del Greco, Naples, Kingdom of Italy
- Died: 11 June 2005 (aged 92); Rome, Italy
- Occupation: Operatic tenor
- Years active: 1940–2005

Francesco Albanese (13 August 1912 – 11 June 2005) was a lyric tenor, particularly associated with the Italian repertory.

A native of Torre del Greco, near Naples, Albanese studied in Rome with Francesco Salfi, and made his stage debut in 1940, at the Teatro dell'Opera di Roma, as Evandre in Gluck's Alceste, where he remained until 1942, also singing Almaviva, Fenton, Rinuccio. In 1942, he made his debut at La Fenice in Venice, as Ramiro, at the Maggio Musicale Fiorentino in Florence, as Don Ottavio, and at the Teatro alla Scala in Milan, as Fenton. After the war, he began appearing abroad, notably at the Teatro Nacional de São Carlos in Lisbon, the Royal Opera House in London, the Teatro Colón in Buenos Aires, and the Hungarian Opera House in Budapest.

Albanese's roles included: Nemorino in L'elisir d'amore, Jeník in Bedřich Smetana's La sposa venduta, Ernesto in Don Pasquale, Ismaele in Nabucco, Faust in Faust, Rodolfo in La bohème, Julien in Gustave Charpentier's Louise, Wolfgang Capito in Paul Hindemith's Mathis il pintore, Avito in Italo Montemezzi's L'amore dei tre re, Giasone in Luigi Cherubini's Medea, Pilade in Christoph Willibald Gluck's Iphigénie en Tauride and Rinaldo in Gioachino Rossini's Armida, as well as others.

Albanese had a fine, well-schooled voice. He can be heard on record in Armida (1952), La traviata (1953) and Iphigénie en Tauride (1957), in each of these opposite Maria Callas.

== Sources ==
- Grove Music Online, Elizabeth Forbes, Oxford University Press, April 2008.
