= Rosa Morandi =

Italian opera singer

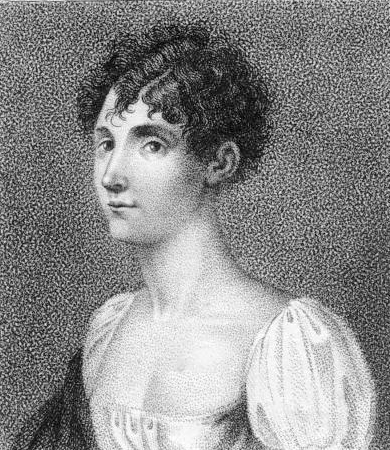
Rosa Morandi by Giovanni Antonio Sasso

Rosa Morandi (born in Senigallia, 15 July 1782; died in Milan 4 May 1824), was an Italian operatic mezzo-soprano. She is especially notable for having created leading roles in operas by Meyerbeer and Rossini.

== Training and career ==
Morandi studied with Giovanni Morandi, whom she married in 1804. She sang at La Scala in 1807 in Così fan tutte and other operas and appeared in the world premiere of Rossini's La cambiale di matrimonio in Venice in 1810. She sang in operas by Mozart, Domenico Cimarosa, Rossini and others at the Théâtre Italien in Paris from 1813 until 1817 and created leading roles in the world premieres of Rossini's Eduardo e Cristina and Meyerbeer's Emma di Resburgo in Venice in 1819. Morandi also appeared in the world premiere of Donizetti's Chiara e Serafina at La Scala in 1822 and was highly esteemed throughout her career for her dramatic and flexible singing.
