= Carolina Cortesi =

Italian opera singer

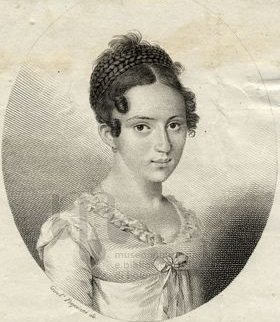
Carolina Cortesi c.1819

Carolina Cortesi (floruit 1819–1821) was an Italian contralto who in her brief career sang in the premieres of several operas of the early 19th century. Most notably, she created the roles of Eduardo in Rossini's Eduardo e Cristina and Edemondo in Meyerbeer's Emma di Resburgo.
