= Lena Belkina =

Ukrainian mezzo-soprano

- Лена Белкина
- Born: Elena Yuryneva Belkina; Олена Юріївна Бєлкіна; 27 November 1987 (age 38); Tashkent, Uzbek SSR
- Other names: Olena Leser
- Occupation: mezzo-soprano
- Website: www.olenaleser.com

Lena Belkina or Olena Leser (born 27 November 1987) is a Ukrainian mezzo-soprano.

== Career ==
Belkina studied at the Kyiv and Leipzig conservatories. From 2009 to 2012, she was a member of the Leipzig Opera, where she worked with P. Konwitschny in Eugene Onegin and Elektra and as Flora in La traviata and Zaida in Il turco in Italia. In 2010, she sang the opening concert of the Handel Festival Halle and made her debut at the Konzerthaus, Vienna in Meyerbeer's Emma di Resburgo. As part of the YSP 2010, Salzburg Festival, during Orfeo, she worked together with conductors such as Riccardo Muti and Ivor Bolton. Under Omer Meir Wellber she sang Olga in a UNITEL recording of Eugene Onegin at the Palau de les Arts, Valencia, and sang at oratorios and recitals in Leipzig, Frankfurt, Munich and Kyiv. At the Vienna State Opera, she debuted in October 2011 as Second Lady in The Magic Flute. At the Deutsche Oper am Rhein in 2011 she stood for Rosina in the new production of Il barbiere di Siviglia. In June 2012, she sang as Angelina Gianluigi Gelmetti in Mondovision's live filming of La Cenerentola, which was recently awarded with the 64th Prix Italia. In November 2012, she was heard in G. Mahler's Kindertotenlieder at the Leipzig Gewandhaus under the direction of Tomáš Netopil, live on MDR. As a member of the Vienna State Opera, she appeared from September 2012 in the following roles: Cherubino, Flora, Polina, and Daphnis during the last season.

== Discography ==
=== Audio CDs ===
- Dolci Momenti / Belcanto Arias (Rossini, Bellini, Donizetti). Lena Belkina, Münchner Rundfunkorchester, Alessandro De Marchi (conductor). Sony Classical, June 2015.
- Giacomo Meyerbeer, Emma di Resburgo. Complete recording with Simone Kermes, Vivica Genaux, Lena Belkina, Thomas Walker, Manfred Hemm, Martin Vanberg, Wiener Singakademie, moderntimes_1800, conductor: Andreas Stoehr. Newplay Classical Recordings, October 2015.
- Classic Vienna, Arias by Mozart, Gluck and Haydn. ORF Radio-Symphonieorchester Wien, Andrea Sanguineti (conductor). Sony Classical, June 2017.
- Passion For Ukraine folksongs and songs by Gregory Alchevskiy, Kyrylo Stetsenko, Mykhailo Zherbin and Illia Razumeiko: Vocalise-Prelude Lena Belkina, Violina Petrychenko. Solo Musica SM418 18th Nov 2022

=== DVD/BluRay ===
- Tschaikowski, Eugene Onegin, Lena Belkina as Olga, mit Kristīne Opolais, Artur Ruciński, Dmitry Korchak, Günther Groissböck. Palau de les Arts, Valencia 2012. Unitel Classica.
- Rossini, Aureliano in Palmira, Lena Belkina as Arsace. Live recording of Rossini Opera Festival Pesaro 2014; Mario Martone (director). Arthaus, 2014
