= Eduardo e Cristina =

Opera by Gioachino Rossini

- Dramma by Gioachino Rossini
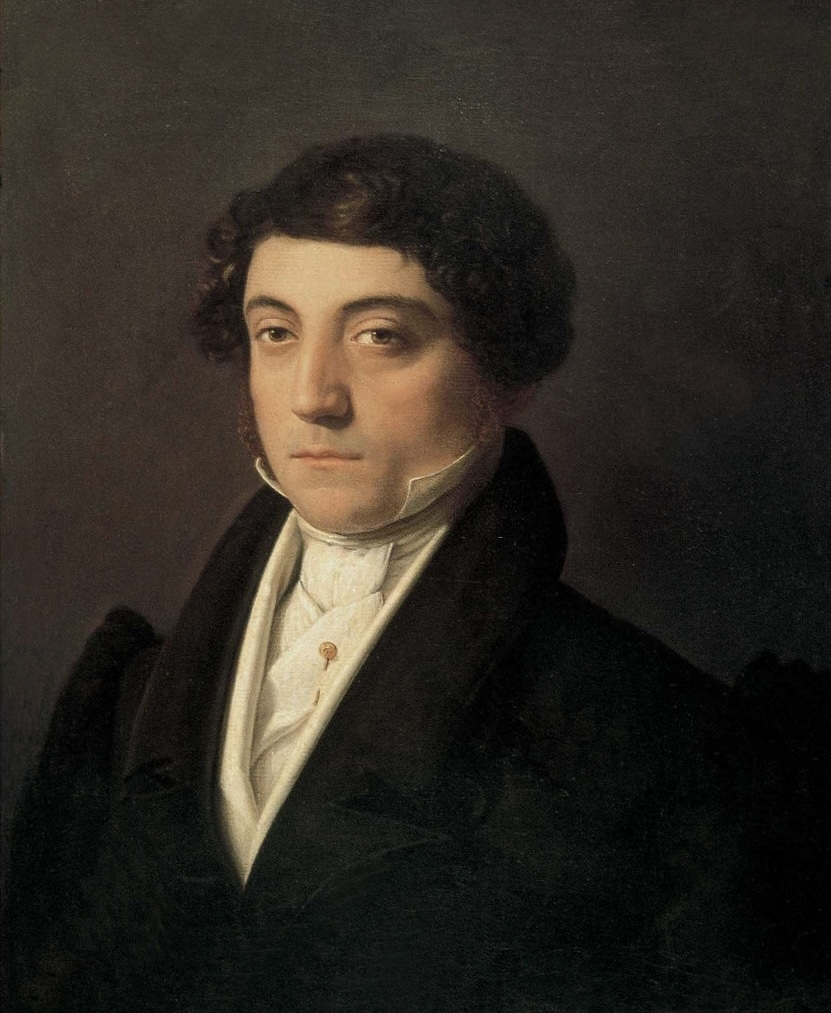
- Portrait of the composer
- Librettist: Giovanni Schmidt
- Language: Italian
- Premiere: 24 April 1819; Teatro San Benedetto, Venice

Eduardo e Cristina (Italian pronunciation: [eduˈardo e kkriˈstiːna]) is an operatic dramma in two acts by Gioachino Rossini to an Italian libretto originally written by Giovanni Schmidt for Odoardo e Cristina (1810), an opera by Stefano Pavesi, and adapted for Rossini by Andrea Leone Tottola and Gherardo Bevilacqua-Aldobrandini.

This pastiche work was composed in a great hurry for a first performance arranged less than a month after the premiere of Ermione. Rossini borrowed "19 of the 26 musical numbers" from his other works, including Adelaide di Borgogna, Ricciardo e Zoraide, as well as Ermione itself.

The opera was first performed at the Teatro San Benedetto, Venice, on 24 April 1819 and given 24 performances that season before being revived the following year at the more prestigious La Fenice. Ironically, while Ermione was not particularly well received, "Eduardo e Christina was a huge success". Apparently, the first performance was so well received that it took six hours, given the large number of encores.

== Performance history ==
The opera received productions elsewhere in Europe up to 1840, but after that they seem to have been very rare. It was given on 25 November 1834 in New York, Unlike most Neapolitan operas by Rossini, this one was "heavily altered from revival to revival". Among other productions, the opera was performed at the Rossini in Wildbad festival in 2017.

== Roles ==
Role	Voice type	Premiere Cast, 24 April 1819 (Conductor: )
Carlo, King of Sweden	tenor	Eliodoro Bianchi
Cristina, his daughter, secret wife of Eduardo	soprano	Rosa Morandi
Eduardo, general of the Swedish army	contralto	Carolina Cortesi
Giacomo, royal prince of Scotland	bass	Luciano Bianchi
Atlei, captain of the guard, friend of Eduardo	bass	Vincenzo Fracalini
Gustavo, small child of Eduardo and Cristina	silent	

== Synopsis ==
Place: Sweden
Time: "The distant past"

Eduardo, commander of the Swedish army, brings news of peace and is greeted triumphantly by King Carlo in Stockholm. That same day, the king announces that his daughter, Cristina, is to be married to Prince Giacomo of Scotland. Cristina, however, is already secretly Eduardo’s wife, and together they have a young son, Gustavo. Christina makes plans to escape, but during the wedding preparations little Gustavo is discovered. Cristina proclaims herself his mother, though she will not reveal the father’s name. When Eduardo appears, he reveals himself to be the boy’s father, and the illicit couple are led off to prison. Cristina continues to refuse a proposal of marriage to Giacomo, even though he has agreed to recognize Gustavo as his own son. Eventually Eduardo is freed by his friend and comrade in arms, Captain Atlei, and together they defeat a surprise attack by the Russians. After the battle, Eduardo hands his sword to King Carlo who, touched, forgives the couple and grants them his blessing.

== Recordings ==
Year	Cast (Carlo, Cristina, Eduardo, Giacomo, Atlei)	Conductor, Opera House and Orchestra	Label
1997	Omar Jara, Carmen Acosta, Eliseda Dumitru, Konstantin Gorny, Jorge Orlando Gómez	Francesco Corti, I Virtuosi di Praga (Recording of a performance at the Rossini in Wildbad Festival, July)	Audio CD: Bongiovanni; Cat: GB 2205/2206-2
2019	Kenneth Tarver, Silvia Dalla Benetta, Laura Poverelli, Baurzhan Anderzhanov, Xiang Xu	Gianluigi Gelmetti, Virtuosi Brunensis, Poznań Camerata Bach Choir	Audio CD:Naxos Records; Cat:8.660466-67
