= Ser Marcantonio =

Ser Marcantonio is an 1810 opera by Stefano Pavesi to a libretto by Angelo Anelli which later was used as the basis of Donizetti's Don Pasquale. The opera was a great success at its premiere at Teatro alla Scala, 26 September 1810 in Milan.

== Recording ==
conducted by Massimo Spadano 2011, Naxos
