= Armida (Rossini) =

1817 opera by Gioachino Rossini

- Opera by Gioachino Rossini
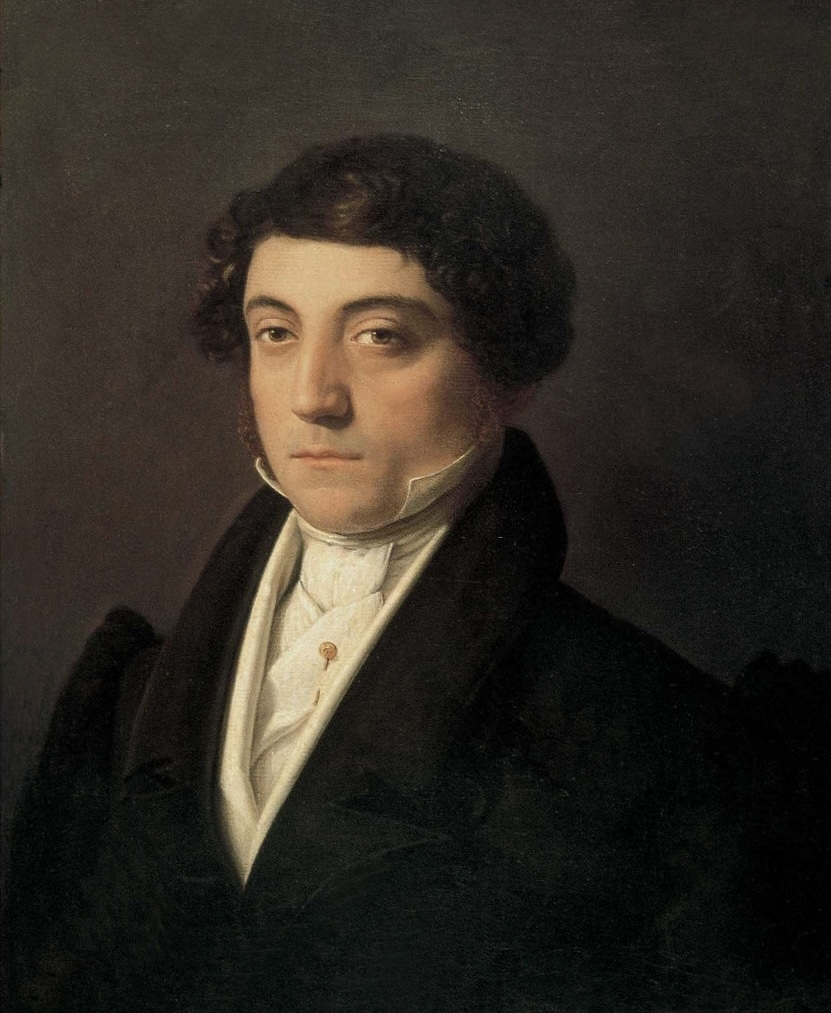
- Rossini in 1815
- Librettist: Giovanni Schmidt
- Language: Italian
- Based on: Scenes from Torquato Tasso's Gerusalemme liberata
- Premiere: 11 November 1817; Teatro di San Carlo, Naples

Armida is an opera in three acts by Italian composer Gioachino Rossini to an Italian libretto (dramma per musica) by Giovanni Schmidt, based on scenes from Gerusalemme liberata by Torquato Tasso.

== Performance history ==
Armida was written to be performed at the Teatro di San Carlo, Naples, on 11 November 1817 to celebrate the opening of the rebuilt opera house, which had been destroyed by fire the previous year. Isabella Colbran sang the title role, which is one of the longest and most demanding that Rossini wrote, with difficult coloratura passages of every kind during the entire opera. The most notable are to be found in "D'amore al dolce impero" during act 2, in the duets between Armida and Rinaldo, and in parts of the act 3 finale.

The first modern staging took place at the Teatro Comunale of Florence on 26 April 1952, during the Maggio Musicale Fiorentino, with Maria Callas and Francesco Albanese in the leading roles and Tullio Serafin conducting. Performances were given in Aix-en-Provence in 1988, with June Anderson, Rockwell Blake, Raúl Giménez, under conductor Gianfranco Masini, and at the Rossini Opera Festival in 1993, with Renée Fleming and Gregory Kunde, under conductor Daniele Gatti.

The United States premiere was given in Tulsa, Oklahoma on 29 February 1992 in celebration of the 200th anniversary of Rossini's birth with a cast that included Christine Weidinger in the title role, Thomas Young as Rinaldo, and Ronald Naldi as Ubaldo. A conjoint production by Tulsa Opera, Tulsa Ballet, and the Tulsa Philharmonic, the work was staged by Nicholas Muni, designed by John Boesche, conducted by Richard Bradshaw, and recorded for national broadcast on NPR. The Metropolitan Opera premiere took place on 12 April 2010, with Renée Fleming in the title role.

Armida was performed at the Rossini Opera Festival in Pesaro in August 2014 in a new production by Luca Ronconi.

== Roles ==
Roles, voice types, premiere cast
Role	Voice type	Premiere cast, 11 November 1817 Conductor: Nicola Festa
Armida, Princess of Damascus, a sorceress	soprano	Isabella Colbran
Rinaldo, a paladin knight	tenor	Andrea Nozzari
Gernando, a paladin	tenor	Claudio Bonoldi
Ubaldo, a paladin	tenor	Claudio Bonoldi
Carlo, a paladin	tenor	Giuseppe Ciccimarra
Goffredo, the leader of the paladins	tenor	Giuseppe Ciccimarra
Eustazio, his brother	tenor	Gaetano Chizzola
Idraote, king of Damascus and Armida's uncle	bass	Michele Benedetti
Astarotte, leader of Armida's spirits	bass	Gaetano Chizzola
Paladins, warriors, demons, spirits

== Synopsis ==
Time: First Crusade
Place: Near Jerusalem

=== Act 1 ===
Goffredo, commander of the Christian forces, comforts and rallies the Frankish soldiers, who are mourning the recent death of their leader. A noblewoman appears and introduces herself as the rightful ruler of Damascus. She claims that her throne has been usurped by her evil uncle Idraote and asks for help and protection. In fact she is the sorceress Armida and in league with Idraote, who has entered with her in disguise. Their plan is to weaken the Crusaders by enslaving some of their best soldiers. The men are so dazzled by Armida's beauty that they convince Goffredo to help her. Goffredo decides that the Franks must choose a new leader, who will then pick ten soldiers to go with Armida. They elect Rinaldo, much to the jealousy of the knight Gernando ("Non soffrirò l'offesa"). Armida and Rinaldo, who is the Crusaders’ best soldier, had met once before, and she is secretly in love with him. She now confronts him and reminds him how she saved his life on that occasion. When she accuses him of ingratitude, he admits that he's in love with her (Duet: "Amor... possente nome!"). Gernando sees them together and insults Rinaldo as a womanizer in front of the other men. They duel and Rinaldo kills Gernando. Horrified by what he has done, he escapes with Armida before Goffredo can punish him.

=== Act 2 ===
Astarotte, one of the princes of Hell, has led a group of demons into a forest to help Armida. She arrives there with Rinaldo, who's completely enthralled by her (Duet: "Dove son io!"). Even when she tells him about Idraote's plot, he doesn't turn against her. To Rinaldo's amazement, Armida then turns the forest into a vast pleasure palace. Armida muses on the power of love ("D'Amore al dolce impero") and offers for Rinaldo's entertainment a pantomime about a warrior being seduced by nymphs. Rinaldo, having lost all thoughts of military honor, gives himself over to Armida's enchantment.

=== Act 3 ===
Two of Rinaldo's fellow knights, Ubaldo and Carlo, have been sent on a mission to save him. When they arrive in Armida's enchanted gardens, they are overwhelmed by the beauty of them, even though they know it's all an illusion. With the help of a magical golden staff, they ward off the nymphs that try to seduce them, then hide when Rinaldo and Armida appear. Rinaldo is still captivated by the sorceress, but once he is alone, Ubaldo and Carlo confront him. When they show him his reflection in a shield, he's horrified to realize that he no longer recognizes himself as the honorable warrior he once was (Trio: "In quale aspetto imbelle"). Still torn by his love for Armida, Rinaldo prays for strength, then leaves with his comrades. Armida calls upon the powers of Hell to bring her lover back but finds herself helpless. She rushes off in pursuit of the men.

Armida reaches the three soldiers before they can sail away. She begs Rinaldo not to desert her and even offers to go into battle with him. Ubaldo and Carlo restrain Rinaldo, trying to bolster his strength, and ultimately drag him away from her. Armida struggles between love and desire for revenge ("Dove son io?... Fuggì!"). She chooses revenge, destroying the pleasure palace and flying away in a rage.

== Notable numbers ==
- Sinfonia

Act 1

- "Sventurata! Or che mi resta?" – quartet (Armida, Eustazio, Goffredo and Idraote)
- "Amor ! Possente nome !" – duet (Rinaldo and Armida)
- "Se pari agli accenti" – duet (Rinaldo and Gernando)

Act 2

- "D'amore al dolce impero" – rondo finale 2 (Armida)
- Danza e coro generale

Act 3

- "In quale aspetto imbelle" – terzet (Rinaldo, Ubaldo, and Carlo)
- "Se al mio crudel tormento" – rondo finale 3 (Armida)

== Recordings ==
Year	Cast: Armida, Rinaldo, Carlo, Goffredo	Conductor, opera house and orchestra	Label
1952	Maria Callas, Francesco Albanese, Gianni Raimondi, Mario Filippeschi	Tullio Serafin, Orchestra and Chorus of the Maggio Musicale Fiorentino (The first revival of the opera in the 20th century. Teatro Comunale, Firenze, 26/April/1952)	CD: Myto
1988	Nelly Miricioiu, Bruce Ford, Raúl Giménez, Raúl Giménez	Claudio Scimone, Netherlands Radio Symphony (Recording of a concert performance in the Concertgebouw, Amsterdam, 24 September)	CD: Celestial Audio; Cat: CA 494
1991	Cecilia Gasdia, Chris Merritt, William Matteuzzi, Bruce Ford	Claudio Scimone, I Solisti Veneti (Studio recording)	CD: Europa Musica; Cat: 350-211
1993	Renée Fleming, Gregory Kunde, Bruce Fowler, Donald Kaasch	Daniele Gatti, Orchestra del Teatro Comunale di Bologna (Recorded at the Rossini Opera Festival)	CD: Sony Classical; Cat: S3K 58 968
2010	Renée Fleming, Lawrence Brownlee, Barry Banks, John Osborn	Riccardo Frizza, Orchestra and Chorus of the Metropolitan Opera, New York. (Recording of a Met Live-in-HD performance)	DVD: Decca; 074 3416
2015	Carmen Romeu, Enea Scala, Dario Schmunck, Dario Schmunck	Alberto Zedda, Ghent Opera orchestra and chorus	DVD:Dynamic; Cat:DYN-57763
