= Ugo, re d'Italia =

Opera by Gioachino Rossini

- Unfinished opera by Gioachino Rossini
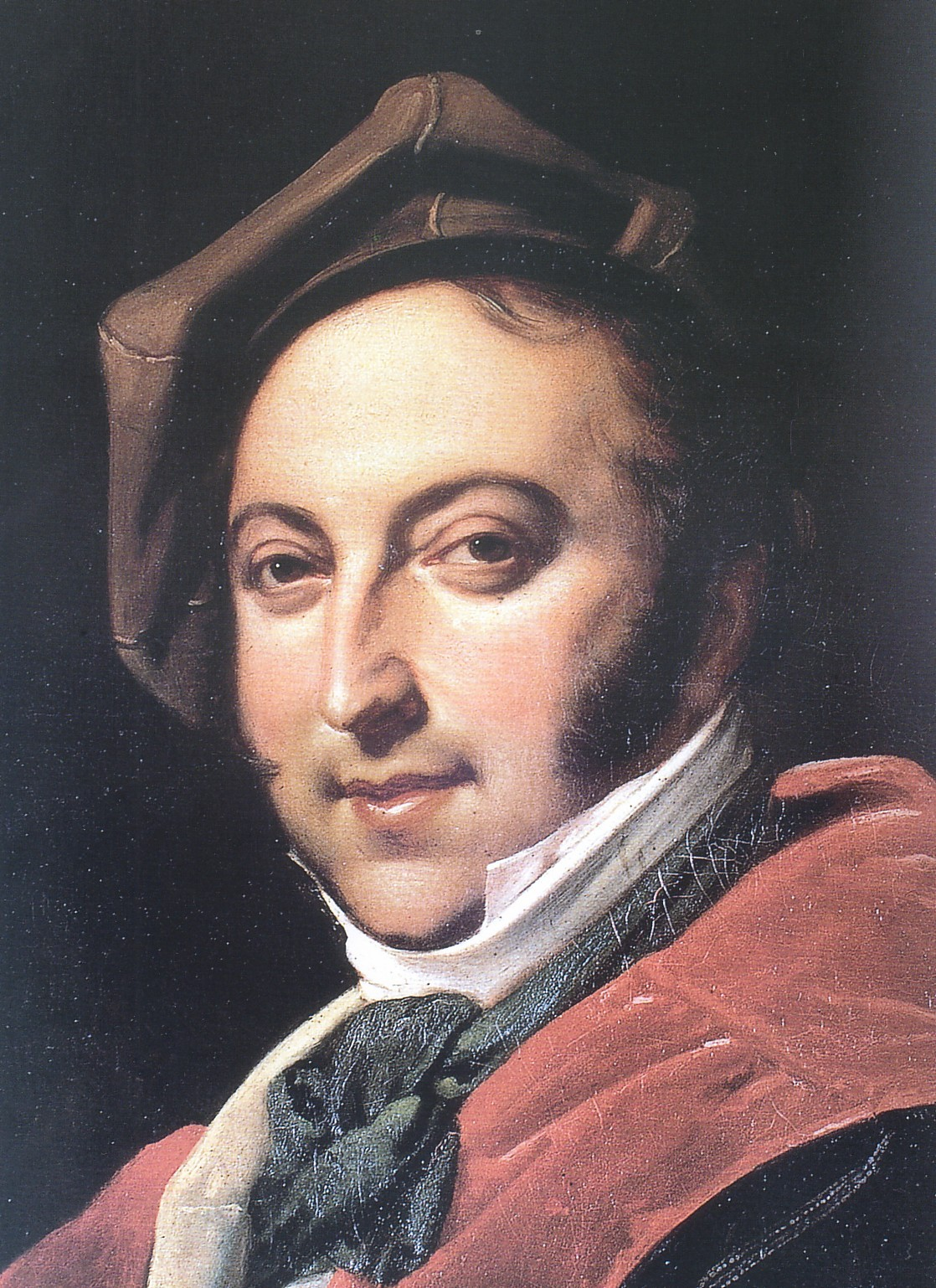
- Rossini c. 1820
- Language: Italian

Ugo, re d'Italia (Hugo, King of Italy) is an unfinished opera by Gioachino Rossini that was abandoned when the composer and his wife, Isabella Colbran, were staying in London from December 1823 until July of the following year. It was intended that the music was to be set to an existing libretto, La figlia dell'aria, by an unknown author.

Scholar Charles Osborne notes that "Rossini had been contracted to write it for performance in London", during the 1824 season although the London Morning Chronicle of 15 December notes that "he was to write two Operas during the season". No completed opera was ever forthcoming.

In addition, the composer was engaged to oversee a season of eight of his operas, while Colbran was engaged to sing in Zelmira and Ricciardo e Zoraide. But when Rossini failed to produce even one opera for the season, due as much to the couple's very hectic social life as anything else, a new contract was drawn up with Benelli noting that the opera was intended to be "commenced and in part finished" by 1 January 1825. Leaving behind the "preliminary workings and a bond for £400 with Benelli's bankers" (as surety for its completion), Rossini and Colbran left England on 25 July 1824, never to return.

== Rossini in Paris and London ==
According to music critic Andrew Porter, it took many attempts from 1816 onward to bring Rossini to London. Following the success of Semiramide in 1823, Rossini was able to spend the summer of that year in Italy, but by mid-1823, the impresario Giovan Battista Benelli (who had taken over the lease at the King's Theatre) prevailed. He had acquired the remaining two years of the lease from John Ebers, who remained as manager. A season was planned for 1824, part of which involved an obligation to complete a two-act opera to be called La figlia dell'aria. For this work, Rossini was to be paid 6,000 francs.

Having accepted the invitation to visit London in the following year, the Rossinis set out for France, arriving in Paris on 9 November to find that "Rossini fever had recently overtaken [that city]". This is demonstrated by the fact that in 1822 the Théâtre-Italien had put on 154 performances, 119 of which were of operas by Rossini. In 1823, six of the nine operas presented were also by the composer. Throughout the month following their arrival, Rossini was feted by the musical establishment and by Parisian society, all with the aim of enticing him into further involvement in their city.

The couple left Paris and arrived in London in late December, but soon became involved in a variety of social activities, which included meeting King George IV in Brighton where Rossini sang the "Largo al factotum" and the king attempted to join in. Other aspects of the social whirl included attendance at soirées, where he was paid £50 per appearance (this was at a time when £1 would have bought an hour's singing lesson), or offers from wealthy people to give singing lessons. All in all, Rossini made a significant amount of money, enough to acquire some savings for the first time in his life. As has been noted, "England, alas, had in large part prepared the way for his early retirement".

== Composition of Ugo ==
Upon Rossini's arrival in late December 1823, it was announced that Ugo would be prepared for "speedy performance", but by late May it appeared to be only "half written". Then Rossini accepted a post at the Academie Royale in Paris, and seemed to be planning to leave London within a month or two. However, Porter presents evidence that by late March, the opera had been completed. In fact, on 23 March 1824, Rossini signed a Bond of Indemnity with Mssrs. Ransom, Benelli's bankers, and deposited £400 with them as surety. Further delays took place, resulting in a new agreement being signed on 5 June with Benelli and his solicitor, which stated that the score, as far as it was complete, would be held by Benelli's bankers. Additionally, the composer agreed that by 1 January 1825 he would "compose and make complete for rehearsal and subsequent representation an opera......then commenced and in great part finished.

Several other things happened to affect the completion of the score. Benelli was declared bankrupt by early 1825 and fled the country and it is known that Mssrs. Ransom held onto "two packets of score and the £400" which they released to a James Kemp on 9 April 1830 upon his signature.

Regarding the fate of the Ugo score, there is some conflicting evidence. Porter notes that it never seems to have surfaced while Osborne states that "two packets of paper and a residual sum of £321.9s.0d [Three hundred and twenty one pounds, nine shillings] were reported to have been handed over to Rossini [in 1831].

== Surviving music ==
There are some sketches of this work preserved in the manuscript of Ermione which is held in the Bibliothèque nationale de France in Paris. One aria ("Vieni, o cara") was reconstructed. It has been recorded by Bruce Ford and released by Opera Rara. However, the music of this aria is largely borrowed from the aria "O fiamma soave" from La donna del lago.
