= Mayeur de Saint-Paul =

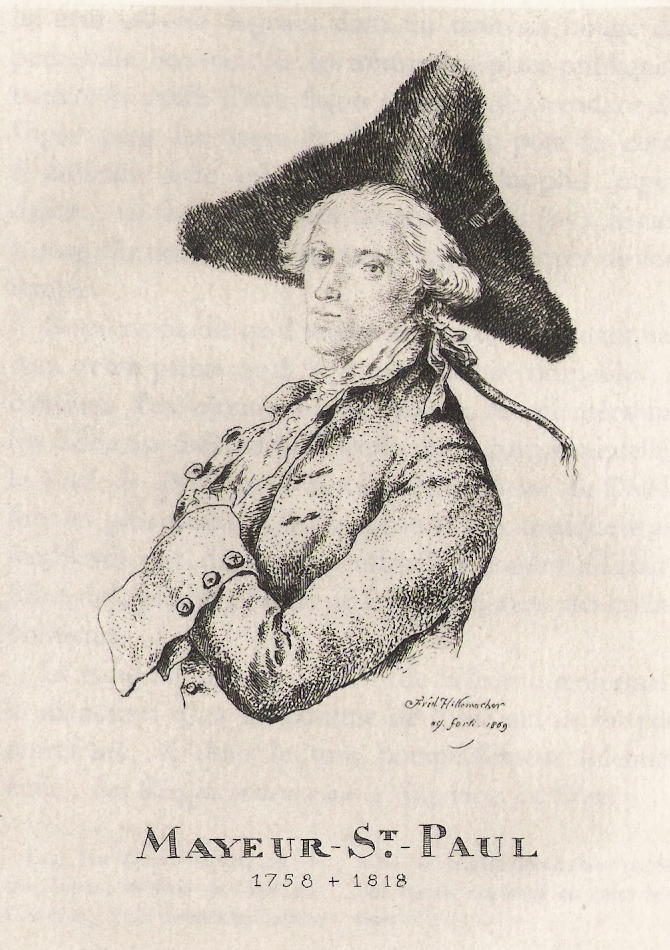
- Mayeur de Saint-Paul
- Born: François-Marie Mayeur; 6 June 1758; Paris, France
- Died: 18 December 1818 (aged 60); Paris, France
- Occupations: Actor; Playwright; Theatre manager

François-Marie Mayeur, called Mayeur de Saint-Paul, (6 June 1758, Paris – 18 December 1818, Paris) was an 18th–19th-century French actor, playwright and theatre director. He was baptised at Église Saint-Paul-Saint-Louis, hence his pseudonym.

== Biography ==
An actor since his childhood in the troupe of Audinot at the Théâtre de l'Ambigu-Comique, he soon became appreciated by the public but very undisciplined, he was locked several times at For-l'Évêque. In 1779 he joined the Grands Danseurs du Roi, in the company of Nicolet, where his popularity followed him.

At the end of the year 1789, he left to play in the French West Indies, especially in Saint-Domingue (today Haiti) with some other artists of the troupe led by the dancer Placide. But the Haitian Revolution forced him to return to France. He arrived in Bordeaux in 1791 and built a room he called Théâtre du Vaudeville-Variétés. Accused of being "moderate" by the revolutionaries in Bordeaux, he left the city and traveled to Nantes and in Paris in 1795, at the Théâtre de la Cité.

In 1798 he sailed again to the colonies and went to Île-de-France (today Mauritius) where he stayed two years, then returned to Paris to take the direction of the Théâtre de la Gaîté.

He then toured the province between 1805 and 1815, from Bordeaux to Lyon, Versailles and Dunkirk. Two years later, he went to Corsica to lead the Bastia theatre, but there met failure. Back in Paris, he died in poverty at the age of 60.

He is the author of sixty plays, often licentious and scandalous works, always anonymous... His Chroniqueur désœuvré (1781–1783) is a sum of rumors on theaters of Paris in the late eighteenth century.

== Pamphlets ==
- 1781: Le Désœuvré ou l'Espion du boulevard du Temple, London, (reprinted in 1782)
- 1782–1783: Le Chroniqueur désœuvré ou l'Espion du boulevard du Temple, contenant les annales scandaleuses et véridiques des directeurs, acteurs et saltimbanques du boulevard, avec un résumé de leur vie et mœurs par ordre chronologique, London, 2 t. in 1 vol. (and 2nd ed. en 1 vol., 1782)
- 1784: Le Vol plus haut, ou l'Espion des principaux théâtres de la capitale, contenant une histoire abrégée des acteurs et actrices de ces mêmes théâtres, enrichie d'observations philosophiques et d'anecdotes récréatives, Memphis, « chez Sincère, libraire, réfugié au Puits de la vérité ».
