= Carlo Federici =

Italian playwright and lawyer

Carlo Federici (1778–1849) was an Italian playwright and lawyer. He was the son of Camillo Federici, an even more prolific playwright. Affected by ill-health in his later years, Camillo dictated many of his plays to his wife and children, including Carlo. Federici was born in Genoa and educated in law at the University of Padua. His 1814 play Il paggio di Leicester, based on Sophia Lee's 1785 historical novel The Recess, was an intermediate source for the libretto of Rossini's opera, Elisabetta, regina d'Inghilterra.

== Works ==
Federici's dramatic works include: (Note: The dates given in this list are for a known performance but not necessarily for the premiere.)

- Il bianco mazzetto, Teatro San Luca, Venice, 1801
- L'amor paterno e la legge, Teatro San Giovanni Grisostomo, Venice, 1801
- Il duca di Ossona, Teatro San Giovanni Grisostomo, Venice, 1801
- Maria Stuardo regina di Scozia, Teatro San Giovanni Grisostomo, Venice, 1801
- Le prigioni di Lamberga, Teatro San Giovanni Grisostomo, Venice, 1801
- La sentinella, Teatro San Giovanni Grisostomo, Venice 1802
- Il paggio di Leicester, Teatro del Fondo, Naples, 1813
- Elisabetta regina di'Inghilterra, Teatro San Benedetto, Venice, 1820
