= La cambiale di matrimonio =

Opera by Gioachino Rossini

- Farsa by Gioachino Rossini
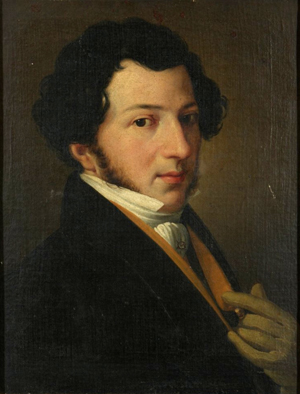
- Rossini c. 1815
- Librettist: Gaetano Rossi
- Language: Italian
- Premiere: 3 November 1810; Teatro San Moisè, Venice

La cambiale di matrimonio ([la kamˈbjale di matriˈmɔnjo]; English: The Bill of Marriage or The Marriage Contract although The Promissory of Marriage is a more precise translation) is a one-act operatic farsa comica by Gioachino Rossini to a libretto by Gaetano Rossi. The libretto was based on the play by Camillo Federici (1791) and a previous libretto by Giuseppe Checcherini for Carlo Coccia's 1807 opera, Il matrimonio per lettera di cambio. The opera debuted on 3 November 1810 at the Teatro San Moisè in Venice. It had a run of thirteen performances at Teatro San Moisè.

Composed in a few days when he was 18 years old, La cambiale di matrimonio was Rossini's first professionally performed opera (Demetrio e Polibio, composed in 1809, was his first composed although it was not performed until 1812). The overture, written when he was a student at the Liceo Musicale in Bologna, is an important part of the modern concert repertoire. As was to become typical of his later career, the duet "Dunque io son" was later reused, to greater effect, in act 1 of The Barber of Seville.

== Roles ==
Role	Voice type	Premiere Cast, 3 November 1810 (Conductor: )
Tobias Mill, an English merchant	baritone	Luigi Raffanelli
Fanny, his daughter	soprano	Rosa Morandi
Edoardo Milfort, Fanny's lover	tenor	Tommaso Ricci
Slook, a Canadian merchant	baritone	Nicola De Grecis
Norton, Mills' clerk	bass	Domenico Remolini
Clarina, Fanny's chambermaid	mezzo-soprano	Clementina Lanari

== Synopsis ==
Place: London, the chambers of Tobias Mill
18th Century

The servants Norton and Clarina discuss a letter which has arrived for their master, Tobias Mill, regarding an impending marriage contract from a Canadian businessman, Slook, who is due to arrive later that day. Mill enters, flustered from calculating the distance from the Americas to Europe, and orders the household to prepare for Slook's arrival, including the readying of his daughter, Fanny, whom he intends to marry off to the foreigner. After everyone leaves, Fanny arrives with her lover, Edoardo Milfort; their love has been kept a secret from Mill due to Edoardo's poor financial status. Norton enters and informs the lovers of the impending marriage contract, but their conversation is interrupted by Mill's entrance as the carriage arrives bearing the Canadian.

Slook enters harassed by the servants who are trying to take his coat: he is clearly unaccustomed to European greetings. Mill encourages Slook to talk to Fanny and to get to know her, but she remains quite hostile, trying to express her disinterest in marrying him with many "but's". However, she is soon joined by Edoardo, and they both threaten to cut out Slook's eyes and puncture his veins. Slook departs to the safety of his room, Fanny and Edoardo to other quarters, as Clarina and Norton return. Before Slook comes back, Clarina expresses her experiences with love and, then upon his return, Norton informs him that the goods he is interested in acquiring are already mortgaged.

Infuriated by this contractual double-crossing, Slook refuses to buy Fanny and tells Mill this. However, he refuses to give a reason fearing retribution from the lovers. Mill then threatens Slook with the prospect of a duel for refusing to carry through with the contract he has incurred. Having encountered three people who wish him dead within hours of his arrival in London, Slook prepares to leave and, when he returns from packing his belongings, he sees Fanny and Edoardo embracing, catching them red-handed, but they tell him about Mill's business-managerial sentiments toward marriage and of Edoardo's poor financial status; Slook responds by promising to make Edoardo his heir so that Fanny may be his.

Mill returns and prepares for his duel, although he fears that, if he dies, it may reflect poorly upon his reputation in the market. Slook reveals himself and clandestinely replaces a pistol with a peace pipe which Mill grabs, not realizing what it is. As they head to the field of battle (Slook armed with a pistol, Mill with a pipe), the ensemble rushes in and tries to convince Mill to give up the financial pretensions. Finally Slook convinces Mill to allow the couple to marry and all ends happily.

== Recordings ==
Year	Cast: Sir Tobia Mill, Fanni, Edoardo, Slook	Conductor, Opera House and Orchestra	Label
1959	Rolando Panerai, Renata Scotto, Nicola Monti, Renato Capecchi	Renato Fasano, I Virtuosi di Roma (Recorded by Mercury in the late summer of 1959 at the Teatro Grande, Brescia)	Audio CD: Italian Opera Rarities; Cat: LO 7738
1990	Bruno Pratico, Alessandra Rossi, Maurizio Comencini, Bruno de Simone	Marcello Viotti, English Chamber Orchestra	Audio CD: Claves Records, Switzerland
2006	Paolo Bordogna, Desirée Rancatore, Saimir Pirgu, Fabio (Maria) Capitanucci	Umberto Benedetti Michelangeli, Orchestra Haydn di Bolzano e Trento (Audio and video recordings made at performances at the Rossini Opera Festival, Pesaro, August).	Audio CD: Dynamic; Cat: CDS 529; DVD: Naxos; Cat: 2110228
2006	Vito Priante, Julija Samsonova, Daniele Zanfardino, Giulio Mastrototaro	Christopher Franklin, Württemberg Philharmonic Orchestra (Video recordings made at the performances at the Rossini at the Rossini in Wildbad Festival, Wildbad, 14 and 16 July 2006).	DVD: Bongiovanni; Cat: 20017

== Selected performances ==
Year	Cast: Sir Tobia Mill, Fanni, Edoardo, Slook	Conductor, Opera House and Orchestra	Locations and Dates
1984	William McCue, Meryl Drower, Harry Nicoll, Alan Watt	Christopher Franklin, Scottish Opera Orchestra	1983/1984 Scottish Opera season (Glasgow, UK); four (4) 1985 performances in Glasgow, UK (2 performances) and Newcastle, UK (2 performances)
2006	Vito Priante, Julija Samsonova, Daniele Zanfardino, Giulio Mastrototaro	Christopher Franklin, Württemberg Philharmonic Orchestra; Rossini in Wildbad	Bad Wildbad, Germany, 8, 14 and 16 July 2006
2012	Igor Bakan, Anna Maria Sarra, Andrew Owens, Ben Connor	Konstantin Chudovsky, Vienna Chamber Orchestra	Vienna, Austria, premiere held on 21 October 2012
2015	Matthew Stump, Jacqueline Piccolino, Brian Thorsett, Efraín Solís	Nicholas McGegan, Philharmonia Baroque Orchestra in partnership with the San Francisco Opera Center	San Francisco, CA, USA, 18 April 2015
2018	Coburn Jones, Fidelia Darmahkasih, Blake Friedman, Matthew Ciuffitelli	David Mayfield, Orchestra of the Phoenicia International Festival of the Voice	Phoenicia, NY, USA, 4 August 2018

== See also ==
- List of operas by Rossini
