= Giovanni Schmidt =

Italian librettist (c. 1775 – after 1839)

- Born: c. 1775; Livorno, Tuscany, Italy
- Died: After 1839 (aged 63–64); Naples, Campania, Italy
- Occupation: Librettist
- Years active: 1800–1839
- Employer: Teatro di San Carlo
- Style: Opera

Giovanni Schmidt (c. 1775, in Livorno – after 1839, in Naples) was an Italian librettist.

== Life ==
Schmidt moved to Naples while he was young, where he remained the rest of his life. Between 1800 and 1839, he wrote libretti for 45 operas, especially for the Teatro di San Carlo, for which he was the official poet. He and Andrea Leone Tottola were the two librettists who dominated theatrical life in Naples in the first quarter of the 19th century. His lyrics were mostly banal and verbose, but were set by the most important composers of the era, such as Giacomo Tritto, Gaetano Andreozzi, Luigi Mosca, Pietro Generali, Saverio Mercadante and Gioachino Rossini. For Rossini alone he wrote texts for Elisabetta, regina d'Inghilterra, Eduardo e Cristina, Armida and Adelaide di Borgogna, which are considered his best works. Because of this, he was depicted as a character in a scene from the 1991 film Rossini! Rossini!, directed by Mario Monicelli.

== Works ==
=== Libretti ===
- Meleagro (opera seria; music by Niccolò Antonio Zingarelli, 1798)
- Idante ovvero I sacrifici d'Eccate (dramma per musica; music by Marcos Portugal, 1800)
- Gli americani (opera seria; music by Giacomo Tritto; 1802)
- Piramo e Tisbe (opera seria; music by Gaetano Andreozzi, 1803)
- Leonora (dramma semiserio; music by Ferdinando Paer, 1804)
- Cesare in Egitto (opera seria; music by Giacomo Tritto, 1805)
- Andromeda (opera seria; music by Vittorio Trento, 1805)
- Il salto di Leucade (music by Luigi Mosca, 1812)
- Ecuba (tragedia per musica; music by Nicola Antonio Manfroce, 1812)
- Elisabetta, regina d'Inghilterra (dramma; music by Gioachino Rossini, 1815)
- Armida (dramma; music by Gioachino Rossini, 1817)
- Adelaide di Borgogna (dramma; music by Gioachino Rossini, 1817)
- Eduardo e Cristina (dramma; music by Gioachino Rossini, 1819)
- L'apoteosi d'Ercole (dramma per musica; music by Saverio Mercadante, 1819)
- Anacreonte in Samo (dramma per musica; music by Saverio Mercadante, 1820)
- Lo sposo in provincia (commedia; music by Giacomo Cordella, 1821)
- La sposa indiana (music by Pietro Generali, 1822)
- L'amante virtuoso (music by Giuseppe Balducci, 1823)
- Le nozze de' Sanniti (dramma per musica; music by Pietro Raimondi, 1824)
- Alessandro nelle Indie (dramma per musica; music by Giovanni Pacini, 1824)
- Anazilia (melodramma; music by Giovanni Pacini, 1825)
- Malvina (music by Michele Costa, 1829)
- Le nozze campestri (dramma per musica; music by Giacomo Cordella, 1840; music by Giuseppe Lillo, 1840)

=== Other works ===
- Cimarosa agli Elisi (sonetto; music by Pietro Casella, 1801)

== Bibliography ==
- The New Grove Dictionary of Music and Musicians. 2000.
- Pacini, Giovanni: Le mie memorie artistiche. Firenze, 1865. (in Italian)
- Rescigno, Edoardo: Dizionario rossiniano. 2002. (in Italian)
