= Maurice Ourry =

French poet, playwright and journalist (1776–1843)

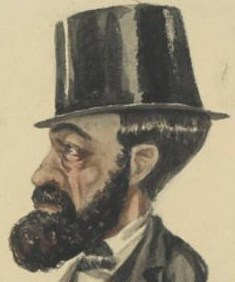
- Portrait of Maurice Ourry by Lhéritier
- Born: 19 October 1776; Bruyères-le-Châtel
- Died: 19 February 1843 (aged 66); Paris
- Occupations: Playwright, journalist, poet

Maurice Ourry (19 October 1776 – 19 February 1843) was a French poet, playwright and journalist.

== Biography ==
After his studies at the College of Juilly, he moved to Paris in 1794. His career was launched with his first vaudeville, La Danse interrompue, which obtained an important success. But the plays that followed, even if numerous, would not equal the success of the first.

An editor by the Journal des arts and the Journal de Paris of which he became chief editor, after the cessation of the newspaper, he founded the Nouveau journal de Paris, solely dedicated to the arts and literature. He also participated to the 'Encyclopédie des gens du monde and to the Dictionnaire de la conversation.

His plays were presented on the most important Parisian stages of the 19th century, including the Théâtre des Variétés, the Théâtre du Vaudeville, and the Théâtre de la Gaîté.

A member of the Caveau Moderne and the Soupers de Momus, seriously ill, he died from an operation in 1843.

== Works ==
- La danse interrompue, vaudeville in 1 act, with Pierre-Yves Barré, 1795
- La Ligue des femmes ou le Roman de la rose, comédie anecdotique in 1 act, in prose mingled with vaudevilles, with de Chazet, 1807
- Le Loup-garou, comedy in 1 act and in prose, mingled with couplets, with Francis baron d'Allarde, 1807
- Quitte à quitte, ou les Jeunes vieillards, comedy in 1 act and in prose, mingled with vaudevilles, 1807
- Les Amours de Braillard, ou Tout le monde en veut, imitation burlesque des Amours de Bayard by Monvel, in 1 act, in prose, mingled with couplets, 1808
- Le Mari juge et partie, comédy in 1 act and in verses, with de Chazet, 1808
- Monsieur Asinard ou Le volcan de Montmartre, 1809
- M. Asinard ou Le Volcan de Montmartre, folie in 1 act, mingled with couplets, with de Chazet, 1809
- Le fils par hasard, ou Ruse et folie, comedy in 5 acts, in prose, with de Chazet, 1809
- Le Jardin, turc, folie in 1 act, mingled with couplets, 1809
- Les baladines, imitation burlesque des Bayadères by Jouy, folie in 1 act, in prose, mingled with couplets, 1810
- Le mai d'amour ou Le rival complaisant, 1810
- Les commissionnaires, 1-act comedy, 1810
- Prologue des Ruines de Rome , 1810
- Le Mai d'amour, ou le Rival complaisant, comedy in 1 act and in prose, mingled with couplets, with de Chazet, 1810
- Les Époux de trois jours, ou J'enlève ma femme, 2-act comedy in prose, mingled with vaudevilles, with Commagny, 1810
- L'Acteur dans sa loge, prologue à travestissements, mingled with couplets, with François-Marie Mayeur de Saint-Paul, 1810
- Mahomet Barbe-bleue, imitation burlesque de Mahomet II, one-act play in prose, mingled with couplets, with Jean-Toussaint Merle, 1811
- Prologue d'Arlequin cendrillon, 1811
- Les Sabines de Limoges, ou l'Enlèvement singulier, vaudeville héroïque in 1 act, with Philibert Rozet and Henri Simon, 1811
- L'Enfant prodigue, ou le Panier percé, folie in 1 act, mingled with couplets, 1811
- Les Hommes femmes, folie in 1 act mingled with couplets, with de Chazet, 1811
- Irons-nous à Paris ? ou Revue de l'an 1810, vaudeville in 1 act, with Merle, 1811
- Ode sur la naissance du roi de Rome, 1811
- Saphirine, ou le Réveil magique, mélo-féerie in 2 acts extravaganza, preceded by the Livre du destin, prologue, with Merle, 1811
- Une journée de garnison, comedy in 1 act, mingled with couplets, with Merle, 1812
- Paris volant, ou la Fabrique d'ailes, folie-épisodique in 1 act in prose and vaudevilles, with Théaulon, 1812
- Crispin financier, comedy in 1 act, with Merle, 1812
- La Chevalière d'Éon, ou les Parieurs anglais, comedy in 1 act, in prose, mingled with vaudeville, with Commagny, 1812
- L'Anglais à Bagdad, comédie-anecdote in 1 act, in prose, mingled with vaudevilles, with Charles-François-Jean-Baptiste Moreau de Commagny, 1812
- La Famille mélomane, comedy in 1 act, mingled with couplets, with de Chazet, 1812
- La Houillière de Beaujonc, ou les Mineurs ensevelis, grand historical tableau vivant, 1812
- Jérusalem déshabillée, parody in un act, in prose and vaudevilles by the opéra de Baour-Lormian, with Commagny and Emmanuel Théaulon, 1812
- La Jeunesse de Henri IV ou La Chaumière béarnaise, one-act comedy, mingled with couplets, with Nicolas Brazier and Merle, 1814
- L'Habit de Catinat, ou La Journée de Marseille, one-act comedy, mingled with couplets, with Merle, 1814
- La Batelière du Loiret, one-act comedy, mingled with vaudevilles, with René de Chazet, 1815
- Malesherbes à St-Denis, poème élégiaque, 1815
- La fille grenadier, one-act comedy, with Merle, 1816
- Poèmes, poésies fugitives, romances, chansons, 1817
- Soirées dramatiques de Jérôme le porteur d'eau, 1817
- Épître au Roi, 1818
- La Leçon d'amour, ou le Rival complaisant, one-act comedy, in prose, mingled with vaudevilles, with Merle, 1818
- La France délivrée, ode, 1818
- La Maison de Pantin, one-act comedy, mingled with couplets, with Merle, 1818
- Et nous aussi nous chantons les vêpres, ou Fanfan Laqueue aux Vêpres siciliennes by Casimir Delavigne, 1820
- Pierre, Paul et Jean, comédie-vaudeville in 2 acts, with Charles-Augustin Sewrin, 1821
- Monsieur Blaise, ou les Deux Châteaux, two-act comedy, mingled with vaudevilles, with Sewrin, 1821
- La Peste de Barcelonne ou le Dévouement français, poem, 1821
- La Morale du Vaudeville, chansonnier à l'usage des enfants et jeunes gens des deux sexes, 1822
- Thompson et Garrick, ou l'Auteur et l'acteur, comedy in 1 act and in verses, mingled with vaudevilles, with Jacquelin, 1822
- Ninette à la Cour, play by Favart, revival with changes, with Armand d'Artois, 1822
- Les mauvaises têtes, one-act comedy, with Sewrin, 1823
- L'Écarté, ou Un lendemain de bal, one-act comedy, mingled with vaudevilles, with de Chazet and Jacques-André Jacquelin, 1822
- Les Funérailles de Louis XVIII, stances, 1824
- Le nouveau caveau pour 1825
- Le Sacre de Charles X, ode, 1825
- Les Bourbons et la France, poems, odes, stances, epistles, etc., followed by the translation in verses of The Rape of the Lock, by Alexander Pope, 1826
- Voltaire à Francfort, anecdotical comedy in 1 act, with Brazier, 1831
- L'Enfance de Boïeldieu, opéra comique and anecdotical in 1 act, 1834
- Conquêtes de l'homme, le puits artésien de Grenelle, poème lyrique, 1841
- Épître à Mlle Mars sur l'annonce de sa retraite, 1841
- Chants et chansons populaires de la France, with Théophile Marion Dumersan, Paul Lacroix and Antoine Le Roux de Lincy, 1843

== Bibliography ==
- Louis Gabriel Michaud, Biographie universelle ancienne et moderne, 1860, (p. 512)
- Gustave Vapereau, Dictionnaire universel des littératures, 1884
- Lieven d'Hulst, Cent ans de théorie française de la traduction, 1990, (p. 187)

== Honours ==
- Croix de la Légion d'honneur (1827)
