= Adelaide di Borgogna =

Opera by Gioachino Rossini

- Opera by Gioachino Rossini
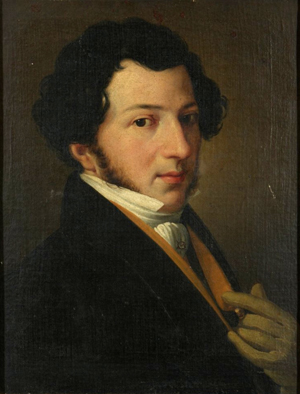
- Rossini c. 1815
- Librettist: Giovanni Schmidt
- Language: Italian
- Premiere: 27 December 1817; Teatro Argentina, Rome

Adelaide di Borgogna, ossia Ottone, re d’Italia (Adelaide of Burgundy, or Otto, King of Italy) is a two-act opera composed by Gioachino Rossini (with contributions by Michele Carafa) to a libretto by Giovanni Schmidt. It was premièred at the Teatro Argentina in Rome on 27 December 1817.

The libretto of the opera is based on an episode in medieval Italian history. Lotario II, King of Italy from 945 to 950, was poisoned by Berengario, who usurped the Italian crown. Lotario’s widow, Adelaide of Burgundy, took refuge in the fortress of Canossa (Canosso in the opera), to escape Berengario, who wanted to force her to marry his son Adelberto. In Canossa, Adelaide was protected by Attone (Iroldo in the opera) but, unable to resist the siege by Berengario, she asked for the intervention of Otto the Great (Ottone in Italian), the “Holy Roman Emperor” of Germany, offering to be his wife if he granted her the royal rights due to her. Otto crossed the Alps with his army, went down to Lombardy, freed Adelaide, married her, and took her with him to Germany.

However, Giovanni Schmidt’s libretto contains some historical inaccuracies: the action is dated in 947, when in reality Lotario died in 950; moreover, the fortress of Canossa is said to be located near Lake Garda, but in reality it is on the Apennines of Reggio Emilia.

The scene takes place partly in the fortress of Canossa, partly in Otto’s camp.

== Performance history ==
20th century and beyond

Performances have included concert versions with Della Jones as Ottone and Eiddwen Harrhy as Adelaide given at London's Queen Elizabeth Hall in November 1978, and another at Usher Hall in Edinburgh on 19 August 2005 with the Scottish Chamber Orchestra and Chorus with Jennifer Larmore as Ottone and Majella Cullagh as Adelaide.

The Festival della Valle d'Itria in Martina Franca in Italy presented staged performances in August 1984, with Ottone sung by Martine Dupuy and Adelaide by Mariella Devia. In addition, the Rossini Opera Festival staged it in Pesaro in August 2006, with Daniela Barcellona and Patrizia Ciofi singing the roles of Ottone and Adelaide respectively and it was presented again in a new production in 2011, also with Barcellona as well as Jessica Pratt in the title role.

== Roles ==
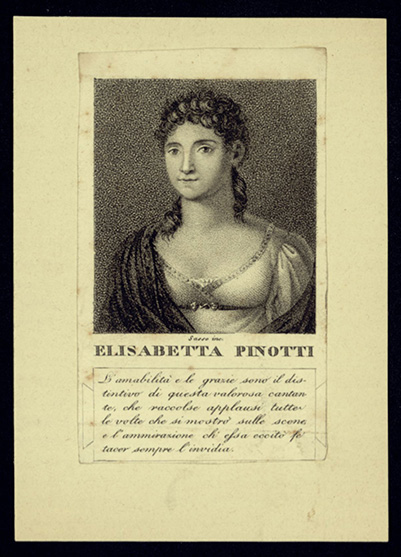
Elisabetta Pinotti, who created the role of Ottone, by Giovanni Sasso

Roles, voice types, premiere cast
Role	Voice type	Premiere cast, 27 December 1817
Adelaide	soprano	Elisabetta Manfredini-Guarmani
Ottone	contralto	Elisabetta Pinotti
Adelberto	tenor	Savino Monelli
Berengario	bass	Gioacchino Sciarpelletti
Eurice	mezzo-soprano	Anna Maria Muratori
Ernesto	tenor	Giovanni Puglieschi
Iroldo	mezzo-soprano or tenor	Luisa Bottesi

== Recordings ==
Year	Cast (Ottone, Adelaide, Berengario, Adalberto)	Conductor, Opera house and orchestra	Label
1984	Martine Dupuy, Mariella Devia, Armando Caforio, Aldo Bertolo	Alberto Zedda, Martina Franca Festival Orchestra and New Cambridge Chorus (Recording of a performance at the Festival della Valle d'Itria in Martina Franca, southern Italy, 4 August)	CD: Fonit Cetra; Cat: 3984 27591
2005	Jennifer Larmore, Majella Cullagh, Mirco Palazzi, Bruce Ford	Giuliano Carella, Scottish Chamber Orchestra and Chorus (Recording of a concert performance in the Usher Hall, Edinburgh, 19 August)	CD: Opera Rara; Cat: ORC 32
2011	Daniela Barcellona, Jessica Pratt, Bogdan Mihai, Nicola Uliviero	Dmitri Jurowski, Orchestra and Chorus of Teatro Comunale di Bologna. (Recording of a performance at the Rossini Opera Festival in Pesaro)	Blu-ray DVD: Arthaus Musik, Cat: 108060
2018	Margarita Gritskova, Ekaterina Sadovnikova, Baurzhan Anderzhanov, Gheorghe Vlad	Luciano Acocella, Virtuosi Brunensis, Camerata Bach Choir, Poznań, Recorded live at the Rossini in Wildbad Festival	CD:Naxos Records; Cat:8.660419-21
