= Luigi Mosca =

Italian composer

- Born: 23 October 1773; Naples, Italy
- Died: 3 November 1832 (aged 59); Naples, Italy
- Education: Pietà dei Turchini Conservatory
- Occupations: Composer; Voice teacher

Luigi Mosca (1775 – 30 November 1824) was an Italian composer of operas and sacred music and a noted singing teacher. He composed eighteen operas, most of which were originally for theatres in Naples, but played throughout Italy in their day.

== Biography ==
Mosca was born in Naples and studied at the Pietà dei Turchini Conservatory there. Like his elder brother Giuseppe Mosca (also an opera composer), he studied composition under Fedele Fenaroli.

== Works ==
=== Operas ===
- L'impresario burlato (opera buffa, libretto by Francesco Antonio Signoretti, Teatro Nuovo, Naples, 1797)
- La sposa tra le imposture (opera buffa, libretto by Francesco Antonio Signoretti, Teatro Nuovo, Naples, 1798)
- Un imbroglio ne porta un altro (opera buffa, libretto by Giuseppe Palomba, Teatro Nuovo, Naples, 1799)
- Gli sposi in cimento (opera buffa, libretto by Francesco Saverio Zini, Teatro Nuovo, Naples, 1800)
- L'omaggio sincero (musical allegory in honour of Ferdinand I of the Two Sicilies, libretto by Giuseppe Pagliuca, Teatro del Palazzo Reale, Naples, 1800)
- Le stravaganze d'amore (opera buffa, libretto by Francesco Saverio Zini, Teatro Nuovo, Naples, 1800)
- Gli amanti volubili (opera buffa, libretto by Jacopo Ferretti, Teatro Valle, Rome, 1801)
- L'amore per inganno (L'amoroso inganno; La cantatrice di spirito) (opera buffa, libretto by Giuseppe Palomba, Teatro dei Fiorentini, Naples, 1801)
- Il ritorno impensato (Il ritorno inaspettato) (opera buffa, libretto by Francesco Saverio Zini, Teatro dei Fiorentini, Naples, 1802)
- L'impostore ossia Il Marcotondo (opera buffa, libretto by Andrea Leone Tottola, Teatro Nuovo, Naples, 1802)
- La vendetta femminina (opera buffa, Teatro dei Fiorentini, Naples, 1803; as La lezione vendetta, Théâtre-Italien, Paris, 1806)
- Gli zingari in fiera (opera buffa, libretto by Giuseppe Palomba, Genoa, 1806)
- I finti viaggiatori (opera buffa, libretto by Nicasio De Mase, Teatro dei Fiorentini, Naples, 1807)
- L'italiana in Algeri (opera buffa, libretto by Angelo Anelli, La Scala, Milan, 1808)
- La sposa a sorte (opera buffa, libretto by Giuseppe Palomba, Teatro dei Fiorentini, Naples, 1810)
- Il salto di Leucade (opera seria, libretto by Giovanni Schmidt, Teatro San Carlo, Naples, 1812)
- L'audacia delusa (opera buffa, libretto by Giuseppe Palomba, Teatro dei Fiorentini, Naples, 1813)
- Il bello piace a tutti (excerpt held in the Vatican Library)

== Sources ==
- de Rosa di Villarosa, Carlo Antonio (1840). "Mosca, Luigi" in Memorie dei compositori di musica del regno di Napoli. Stamperia reale (in Italian)
- Tartak, Marvin & Beghelli, Marco (2001). "Mosca, Luigi". In Sadie, Stanley & Tyrrell, John (eds.). The New Grove Dictionary of Music and Musicians (2nd ed.). London: Macmillan Publishers. ISBN 978-1-56159-239-5.
- Wier, Albert Ernest (ed.) (1938). "Mosca, Luigi" in The Macmillan Encyclopedia of Music and Musicians, Volume 2. The Macmillan Company
