= Camillo Federici =

Italian dramatist and actor

Camillo Federici (9 April 1749 – 23 December 1802) was an Italian dramatist and actor.

He was born at Garessio, a small town in Piedmont. His real name was Giovanni Battista Viassolo; he took his pen-name from the title of one of his first pieces, Camillo e Federico. He was educated at Turin, and showed an early fondness for literature, especially for the theatre. The praise he received for his early attempts made him persevere this choice of career, and he obtained engagements with several companies both as writer and actor.

He made a happy marriage in 1777, and soon afterwards left the stage and devoted himself entirely to writing. He settled at Padua, and the reputation of his numerous comedies rapidly spread in Italy, for a time eclipsing that of his predecessors. Most of his plays were melodramas, and his work became repetitive, but he caught something of the new spirit appearing in German dramatic literature, in the works of Schiller, Iffland and Kotzebue. When his financial success came to an end, he found a helpful friend in a wealthy merchant of Padua, Francis Barisan, for whose private theatre he wrote many pieces.

In 1791 he became dangerously ill and was unable to work for several years. His works, in the absence of any copyright law, were published by others without his permission. In 1802, he undertook to prepare a collected edition; but of this four volumes only were completed when he was again taken ill, and died at Padua.

The publication of his works was completed in 14 volumes in 1816. Another edition in 26 volumes was published at Florence in 1826 to 1827. A biographical memoir of Federici by Neymar appeared at Venice in 1838. Federici's son Carlo was also a playwright.

== Bibliography ==
- D'Agostino, John, Camillo Federici (1749-1802) Online English translation of biography of Federici. Retrieved 30 December 2012
