= Margarita Gritskova =

Russian mezzo-soprano

Margarita Gritskova Маргарита Грицкова
- Born: Margarita Vitalievna Gritskova; 9 December 1987 (age 38); Saint Petersburg, RSFSR, USSR
- Education: Saint Petersburg Conservatory
- Occupation: Operatic mezzo-soprano
- Organizations: Vienna State Opera
- Awards: Luciano Pavarotti International Competition in Modena

Margarita Vitalievna Gritskova (Russian: Маргарита Витальевна Грицкова; born 9 December 1987) is a Russian mezzo-soprano in opera and lied singing. A member of the Vienna State Opera since 2012, she is focused on roles by Rossini such as Rosina in Il barbiere di Siviglia and La Cenerentola, but has also performed in Baroque opera and contemporary works such as Tri sestri by Péter Eötvös.

== Life and career ==
=== Education and early career ===
Born in Saint Petersburg, Gritskova studied piano and voice at the Saint Petersburg Conservatory with Irina Petrovna Bogacheva. She won several international singing competitions. During her studies, she performed the title role in Bizet's Carmen at the Saint Petersburg Conservatory, conducted by Mariss Jansons, in 2008. Gritskova has performed on Tenerife, in St. Moritz and Budapest, among others.

From the 2010/11 season, she was a member of the ensemble of the Deutsches Nationaltheater Weimar, where she appeared in roles such as Carmen, Ottone in Monteverdi's L'incoronazione di Poppea, Cherubino in Mozart's Le nozze di Figaro, Bradamante in Handel's Alcina, Maddalena in Verdi's Rigoletto, Olga in Tchaikovsky's Eugene Onegin, and Flora in Verdi's La traviata.

=== Vienna State Opera ===
From the 2012/13 season, Gritskova joined the ensemble of the Vienna State Opera. There she performed especially in Mozart roles, including Dorabella in Così fan tutte, Sesto and Annio in La clemenza di Tito, Idamante in Idomeneo, and Cherubino in Le nozze di Figaro. Her Rossini roles included Rosina in Il barbiere di Siviglia, Angelina and Tisbe in La Cenerentola, and Isabella in L'italiana in Algeri. She also appeared as Smeton in Donizetti's Anna Bolena, Carmen, Feodor in Mussorgsky's Boris Godunov, the Dryad in Richard Strauss's Ariadne auf Naxos, Krista in Janáček's Věc Makropulos, and Masha in Tri sestri by Péter Eötvös.

=== Guest opera engagements ===
In 2015, Gritskova first appeared at the Salzburg Festival as Cherubino. She also performed at the Rossini festivals in Bad Wildbad and Pesaro, and in 2017 appeared as Isolier in Rossini's Le comte Ory at the Operklosterneuburg festival. In 2018, she first performed at the Opernhaus Zürich as Charlotte in Massenet's Werther.

In 2021, Gritskova returned to the Deutsches Nationaltheater Weimar as Amneris in Verdi's Aida.

In April 2022, she appeared as Marchesa Melibea in Rossini's Il viaggio a Reims at the Bolshoi Theatre in Moscow, performing the role on 13 and 15 April.

In March 2023, she sang Angelina in Rossini's La Cenerentola with Victorian Opera at the Melbourne Recital Centre. Later that year, she appeared as Princess Eboli in Verdi's Don Carlo at Oper Klosterneuburg. In 2025, she sang Princess Eboli in Don Carlos at the Finnish National Opera in Helsinki.

=== Concert and gala appearances ===
Gritskova has also taken part in concerts and recitals, including the farewell concert for José Carreras at Carnegie Hall in New York City in September 2017.

On 1 October 2022, Gritskova performed at the First Baltic Charity Ball at the Boris Yeltsin Presidential Library in Saint Petersburg. She appeared in the gala concert with the Saint Petersburg State Academic Symphony Orchestra; the event, held with the support of the Saint Petersburg Committee for Culture, raised funds for the Life Line charitable foundation for seriously ill children.

In June 2024, Gritskova was one of the featured singers at the Opera Ball at the Moscow Manege. The event was the continuation, under a new name, of the Vienna Ball in Moscow.

== Awards ==
- 2001: First prize at the II Open Rachmaninoff Regional Festival
- 2003: Grand Prix at the II Open Rubinstein Children's Competition
- 2004: Prize at the international competition In the Sign of Talents for especially gifted children – awarded with the Academic Likhachev Star
- 2006: Prize of the III. open Russian music competition for singing and piano duos
- 2007: Prize of the III. open Russian music competition for opera singers
- 2008: Prize For the Youngest Talent at the Luciano Pavarotti International Competition in Modena.
- 2009: First prize and award for youngest talent at the IV International Competition in Colmenar Viejo
- 2010: Finalist at the international singing festival "Operalia"
