= Elisabetta, regina d'Inghilterra =

Opera by Gioachino Rossini

- dramma per musica by Gioachino Rossini
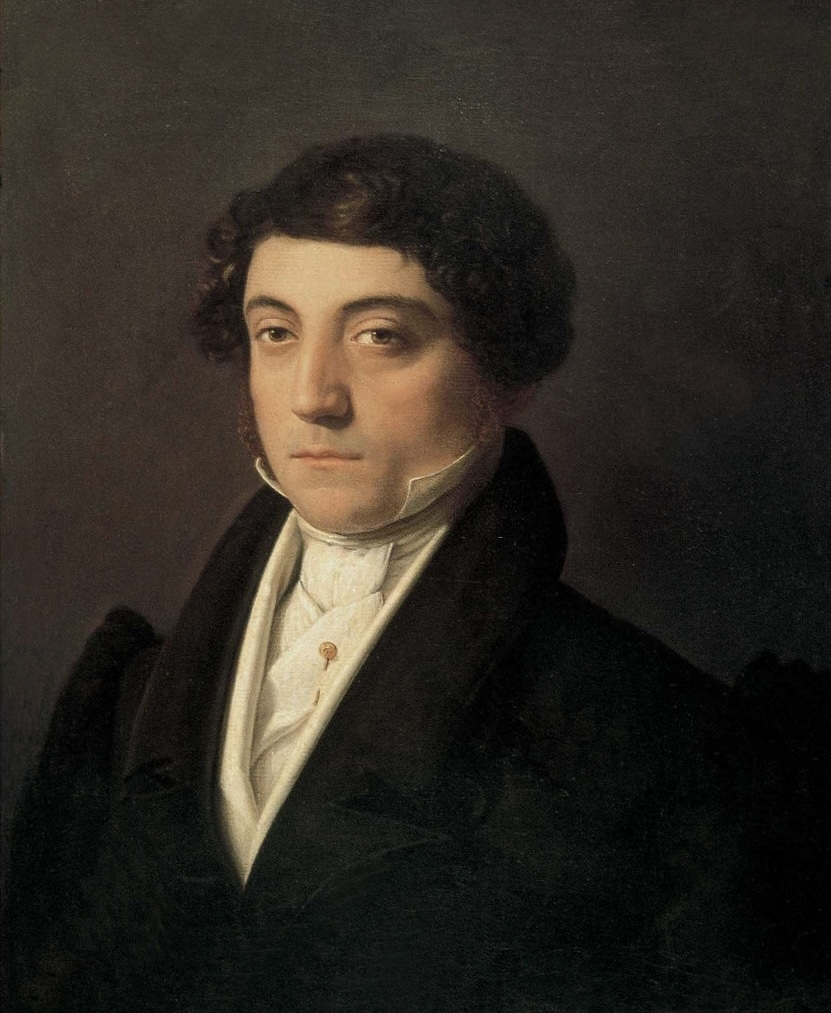
- Portrait of the composer
- Librettist: Giovanni Schmidt
- Language: Italian
- Based on: Il paggio di Leicester by Carlo Federici and The Recess (1785) by Sophia Lee
- Premiere: 4 October 1815; Teatro San Carlo, Naples

Elisabetta, regina d'Inghilterra (Italian pronunciation: [elizaˈbɛtta reˈdʒiːna diŋɡilˈtɛrra]; Elizabeth, Queen of England) is a dramma per musica or opera in two acts by Gioachino Rossini to a libretto by Giovanni Schmidt, from the play Il paggio di Leicester (Leicester's Page) by Carlo Federici, which itself "was derived from a novel The Recess (1785) by Sophia Lee."

It was premiered at the Teatro San Carlo in Naples on 4 October 1815 and was the first of nine operas which Rossini wrote for the San Carlo. Altogether, this was one of eighteen operas which he wrote during the time he spent in Naples.

Rossini took melodies from other operas to compose Elisabetta, including the overture, first written for Aureliano in Palmira, which is more famous as the overture to The Barber of Seville. As Holden notes, with the re-uses of earlier music, "it is as if Rossini wished to present himself to the Neapolitan public by offering a selection of the best music from operas unlikely to have been revived in Naples."

Some of Elisabetta's music was recycled in later operas and a part of Elisabetta's first aria was re-used by Rossini four months later in Rosina's aria "Una voce poco fa" in the opera The Barber of Seville.

== Performance history ==
The opera was first given in the UK on 30 April 1818 at the King's Theatre in London.

Notable performances include Palermo (1970), Arles (1975), Teatro Regio di Torino, the Teatro San Carlo, Naples (1991), in New York (1998, given by Opera Northwest), at the Teatro Margarita Xirgu, Buenos Aires (2004), and at the Rossini Festival in Pesaro (2004).

== Roles ==
Role	Voice type	Premiere Cast, 4 October 1815 (Conductor: Nicola Festa)
Elisabetta (Elizabeth I of England)	soprano	Isabella Colbran
The Earl of Leicester, Commander of the army	tenor	Andrea Nozzari
Matilda, secretly married to Leicester	soprano	Girolama Dardanelli
Enrico, Matilda's brother	contralto	Maria Manzi
The Duke of Norfolk	tenor	Manuel Garcia
Guglielmo, Captain of the Royal Guard	tenor	Gaetano Chizzola
Knights, ladies, noble Scotsmen hostages to Elisabetta, official followers of Leicester, pages, royal guards, soldiers, people (chorus)

== Synopsis ==
Time: Reign of Elizabeth I
Place: London

=== Act 1 ===
Throne Room of Whitehall Palace,

The Earl of Leicester is celebrating his victory over the Scots. The Duke of Norfolk, who is also present, scowls with jealousy. The Queen enters: (Aria: Quant'è grato all'alma mia). Leicester is honored, and says he has brought home the sons of nobility as hostages. However, he recognizes his wife, Matilda, and her brother, Enrico, as belonging to that group.

When they are alone, Leicester reproaches his wife (Duet: Incauta, che festi?). Because she is the daughter of Mary, Queen of the Scots, she is in danger. Matilda tells Leicester that the Queen loves him as well. She mourns her ill fortune: (Aria: Sento un'interna voce). Leicester decides that, to avoid suspicion, he will speak to neither Matilda nor to her brother, Enrico.

Royal apartments

Instead, Leicester tells Norfolk of his secret marriage and Norfolk, in turn, tells the Queen: (Duet: Perché mai, destin crudele). She reacts to the news in fury.

The hostages and Leicester are sent for. The Queen offers to make him consort, and, upon his refusal, she accuses him of treason, and has both him and Matilda arrested.

=== Act 2 ===
Rooms in the Palace

The Queen states that she has sentenced Matilda to death. She demands that Matilda renounce her marriage to Leicester in return for his, her brother, Enrico's, and her own safety. Leicester enters, tears the document up, and is once again arrested along with Matilda. Also, the Queen banishes Norfolk for behaving badly towards Leicester.

Outside the Tower of London

People lament Leicester's upcoming execution. Norfolk appears. He induces the crowd to try to free Leicester.

Leicester's prison cell

He laments his fate. Norfolk enters and convinces Leicester that he has begged the Queen to pardon him, instead of having betrayed him. The Queen enters to see Leicester prior to his death. Norfolk has hidden, and Matilda and Enrico are hiding as well. Leicester tells the Queen that Norfolk has accused him. Norfolk emerges with a dagger drawn to stab the Queen, when Matilda emerges and throws herself between them. The Queen condemns Norfolk to death, and, in the aria, Bell'alme generose, pardons Leicester and the Scottish prisoners.

== Recordings ==
Year	Cast (Elisabetta, Leicester, Matilde, Enrico, Norfolk)	Conductor, Opera House and Orchestra	Label
1971	Leyla Gencer; Umberto Grilli; Margherita Guglielmi; Giovanna Vighi, Pietro Bottazzo	Gianandrea Gavazzeni, Orchestra and Chorus of Teatro Massimo, Palermo, (Recording of a performance in Palermo)	Audio CD: Celestial Audio; Cat: CA 235
1975	Montserrat Caballé, José Carreras, Valerie Masterson, Rosanne Creffeld, Ugo Benelli	Gianfranco Masini, Ambrosian Opera Chorus, London Symphony Orchestra	Audio CD: Philips; Cat: 432 453–2
1985	Lella Cuberli; Antonio Savastano, Daniela Dessi, Adriana Cicogna, Rockwell Blake	Gabriele Ferro, Orchestra and Chorus of Teatro Regio di Torino, (Recording of a performance in Turin)	DVD: Hardy Classic Video; Cat: 4007
1999	Inga Balabanova, Harald Quadeen, Akie Amou, Mario Zeffiri, Agata Bienkowska	Herbert Handt, Stuttgarter Philarmoniker, Tschechischer Kammerchor, (Recording of a performance at Kursaal Bad Wildbad during the Rossini in Wildbad Festival, July)	Audio CD: Bongiovanni; Cat: GB 2291/92-2
2002	Jennifer Larmore; Bruce Ford; Majella Cullagh; Manuela Custer, Antonino Siragusa	Giuliano Carella, The Geoffrey Mitchell Choir, London Philharmonic Orchestra	Audio CD: Opera Rara; Cat: ORC 22
2024	Serena Farnocchia Patrick Kabongo Veronica Marini Mara Gaudenzi Mert Süngü	Antonino Fogliani, Kraków Philharmonic Chorus and Orchestra	Audio CD: Naxos Cat: 8.660538-39
