= Stefano Pavesi =

Italian composer

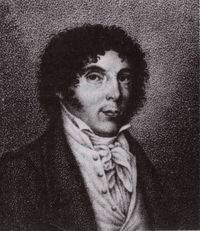
- Born: 22 January 1779; Casaletto Vaprio, Italy
- Died: 28 July 1850 (aged 71); Crema, Italy
- Occupation: Composer

Stefano Pavesi (22 January 1779, Casaletto Vaprio – 28 July 1850) was an Italian composer. He is primarily known as a prolific opera composer; his breakthrough opera was Fingallo e Comala, and his acknowledged opera masterpiece is Ser Marcantonio. He also served as the maestro di cappella of Crema Cathedral from 1814 to 1818 (shared with Giuseppe Gazzaniga), and alone from 1818 (upon Gazzaniga's death) until his death at the age of 71.

== Life and career ==
His first music studies were in Crema (neighboring his birthplace), followed by studies in Naples. While in Naples, Pavesi actively joined the Parthenopean Republic. After its suppression, Pavesi was denounced, imprisoned, and deported to France (allegedly Cimarosa intervened to prevent his execution). In France he played the serpent in Napoleon's army band and remained in Italy after the Battle of Marengo. He returned to Crema in 1814 after the Austrian occupation of northern Italy after the War of the Sixth Coalition. He suffered a stroke in 1831 after the failure of his opera Fenella.

== Operas ==
Among his 66 operas are:

- La pace (Livorno, Teatro degli Avvalorati 1801)
- L'avvertimento ai gelosi (La scuola dei gelosi) (Venezia, Teatro San Benedetto 1803)
- L'amante anonimo (Venezia, Teatro San Moisè 1803)
- I castelli in aria (Verona, Teatro Filarmonico 1803)
- La forza dei simpatici (Verona, Teatro Filarmonico 1803)
- Andromaca (Genova, Teatro Sant'Agostino 1804)
- La fiera di Brindisi (Firenze, Teatro della Pergola 1804)
- Fingallo e Comala (Venezia, Teatro La Fenice 1805)
- Il trionfo di Emilia (Milano, Teatro alla Scala 1805)
- Amare, e non voler essere amante ossia L'abitore del bosco (Venezia, Teatro La Fenice 1805)
- L'incognito ossia L'abitatore del bosco (rev. di Amare, e non voler essere amante) (1805)
- I cherusci (I riti cherusci; Dattalo e Amanzia) (Venezia, teatro La Fenice 1807)
- Gli antichi Cherusci (rev. of I cherusci) (1818)
- Sapersi scegliere un degno sposo ossia Amor vero, e amor interessato (L'amor vero) (Venezia, Teatro La Fenice 1807)
- Il maldicente ossia La bottega del caffè (Firenze, Teatro degli Infuocati 1807)
- Il servo padrone ossia L'amor perfetto (Bologna, Teatro Marsigli-Rossi 1808)
- La festa della rosa (Venezia, Teatro La Fenice 1808)

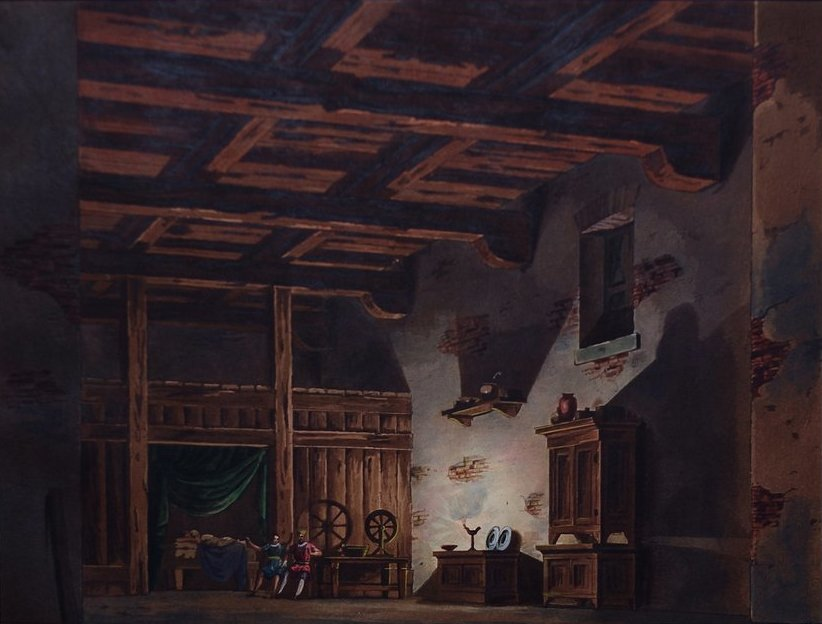
Set design by Alessandro Sanquirico for La gioventù di Giulio Cesare, Milan, La Scala, 1817

- Il trionfo delle belle (Corradino; Corradino cuori di ferro; Il trionfo del bel sesso; Elena e Corrado; L'odio delle donne) (Venezia, Teatro San Moisè 1809)
- Odoardo e Cristina (Napoli, Teatro San Carlo 1810)
- Ser Marcantonio Milano, Teatro alla Scala, 1810
- Il trionfo dell'amore ossia Irene e Filandro (Napoli, Teatro Nuovo 1811)
- Nitteti (Torino, Teatro Regio 1811)
- Agatina o La virtù premiata (Milan, Teatro alla Sala 1814)
- La gioventù di Giulio Cesare, libretto by Felice Romani (Milan, Teatro alla Scala 1817)
- Arminio ossia L'eroe germano (Arminio, ossia L'eroe cherusco) (Venezia, Teatro La Fenice 1821)
- Antigona e Lauso (Milano, Teatro alla Scala 1822)
- I cavalieri del Nodo (Napoli, Teatro San Carlo 1823)
- Il solitario ed Elodia (Napoli, Teatro San Carlo 1826)
- La donna bianca d'Avenello (Milano, Teatro della Canobbiana 1830)
- Fenella ossia La muta di Portici (Libretto di Gaetano Rossi, Venezia, Teatro La Fenice 1831)
- Ardano e Artula

== Non-operatic works ==
- Dies Irae Concertato (1818): After becoming maestro di cappella of the Crema Cathedral upon Giuseppe Gazzaniga's death in 1818, his main creative outlet was church music. His Dies Irae Concertato dates from 1818, and may have been written for Gazzaniga's funeral.

== Bibliography ==
- Sanseverino, Fausto. Notizie Intorno la Vita e le Opere del Maestro di Musica Stefano Pavesi. Printed by Giovanni Ricordi, Milan 1851. To date the only biography of Pavesi, written a year after his death.
- Pavesi, Stefano. Dies Irae Concertato. Rey M. Longyear, editor. A-R Editions, Inc. Madison, Wisconsin, 1998. The first printed edition of the score, prepared by Longyear from the autograph full score and manuscript parts at the Biblioteca Comunale in Crema, Italy.
