= Anna Caterina Antonacci =

Italian soprano

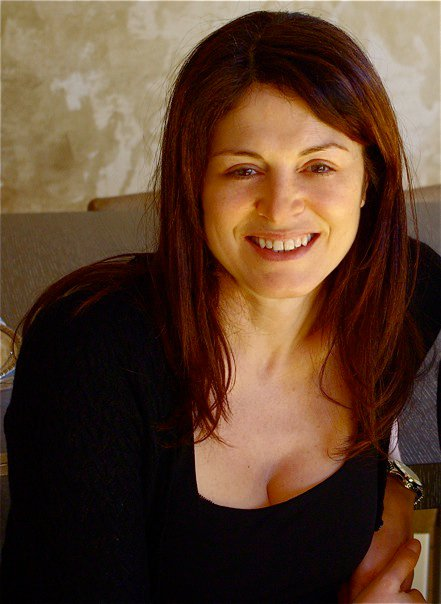
Anna Caterina Antonacci, July 2012

Anna Caterina Antonacci (born 5 April 1961) is an Italian soprano known for roles in the bel canto and Baroque repertories. After long performing as a mezzo-soprano, particularly the Rossini canon (but never its great contralto breeches roles), around 2005 she made the move to soprano official. Maestro Riccardo Muti has described her voice as a Falcon soprano.

== Life and career ==
Anna Caterina Antonacci was born in Ferrara, Italy on April 5, 1961. She studied in Bologna and made her debut as Countess Ceprano in Verdi's Rigoletto, in 1984, at the Maggio Musicale Fiorentino. In 1994, she made her Royal Opera debut as Elcia in Mosè in Egitto. She appeared there again in 2006 in Carmen opposite Jonas Kaufman. In 2003 she created the role of Victoria Bearing in the world premiere of Marco Tutino's Vita at the Teatro alla Scala in Milan, and in 2015 that of Cesira in Tutino's Two Women (La ciociara) at the San Francisco Opera. She was profiled at length by The New York Times in March 2012. In 2013, she appeared in La voix humaine at the Opéra-Comique. She had been married until his death in 2023 of cancer to the water polo player Luca Giustolisi, with whom she had a son, Gillo.

== Repertory ==
- Bellini: Adalgisa (Norma), Romeo (I Capuleti e i Montecchi)
- Berlioz: Cassandre (Les Troyens), Marguerite (La damnation de Faust), Cléopâtre (La mort de Cléopâtre)
- Bizet: Carmen (Carmen)
- Cherubini: Medea (Medea)
- Cimarosa:Orazia (Gli Orazi ed i Curiazi)
- Donizetti: Elisabetta (Maria Stuarda)
- Giramo: la pazza (La pazza)
- Gluck: Alceste (Alceste), Armide (Armide), Iphigénie (Iphigénie en Tauride)
- Halévy: Rachel (La Juive)
- Handel: Agrippina (Agrippina), Rodelinda (Rodelinda), Serse (Serse)
- Manfroce: Polissena (Hecuba)
- Massenet: Dulcinée (Don Quichotte), Chimène (Le Cid), Charlotte (Werther)
- Mayr: Clotilde (La rosa bianca e la rosa rossa)
- Monteverdi: Amore, Pallade, Poppea and Nerone (L'incoronazione di Poppea)
- Mozart: both Fiordiligi and Dorabella (Così fan tutte), Donna Elvira (Don Giovanni), Elettra (Idomeneo), Marcellina (Le nozze di Figaro), Vitellia (La clemenza di Tito),
- Paër: Briseide (Achille)
- Paisiello: Elfrida (Elfrida), Nina (Nina)
- Puccini: Kate Pinkerton (Madama Butterfly)
- Purcell: Dido, First Witch, Sailor (Dido and Aeneas)
- Rossini: Rosina (Il barbiere di siviglia), Dorliska (Torvaldo e Dorliska), Ninetta (La gazza ladra), Semiramide (Semiramide), Ermione (Ermione), Elisabetta (Elisabetta, regina d'Inghilterra), Elena (La donna del lago), Zelmira (Zelmira), Elcia (Mosè in Egitto), Anaï (Moïse), Angelina (La Cenerentola)
- Tutino: Cesira (La ciociara), Victoria Bearing (Vita)
- Verdi: Countess Ceprano (Rigoletto), Flora (La traviata), both Alice Ford and Meg Page (Falstaff), Marchesa del Poggio (Un giorno di regno)

== Discography ==
Operas

- Berlioz: Les Troyens, John Eliot Gardiner, Théâtre du Châtelet
- Bizet: Carmen, Antonio Pappano, Covent Garden
- Handel: Rodelinda, William Christie, Glyndebourne Opera
- Marschner: Hans Heiling, Renato Palumbo, Cagliari Opera
- Monteverdi: L'incoronazione di Poppea, Ivor Bolton, Bavarian State Opera
- Mozart: Così fan tutte (Fiordiligi), Gustav Kuhn, Orchestra Filarmonica Marchigiana
- Mozart: Don Giovanni, Riccardo Muti, Vienna State Opera
- Mozart: Le nozze di Figaro, Claudio Abbado, Vienna State Opera
- Rossini: Ermione, Andrew Davis, Glyndebourne
- Verdi: Falstaff (Meg Page), Riccardo Muti, La Scala

Solo

- Era La Notte/Anna Caterina Antonacci (Monteverdi, Strozzi, Giramo)
- Monteverdi, Giramo, Strozzi, Carissimi, Cesti: "Lamenti Barocchi" Sergio Vartolo, Naxos 1995
