= Ermione =

Opera by Gioachino Rossini

- Opera by Gioachino Rossini
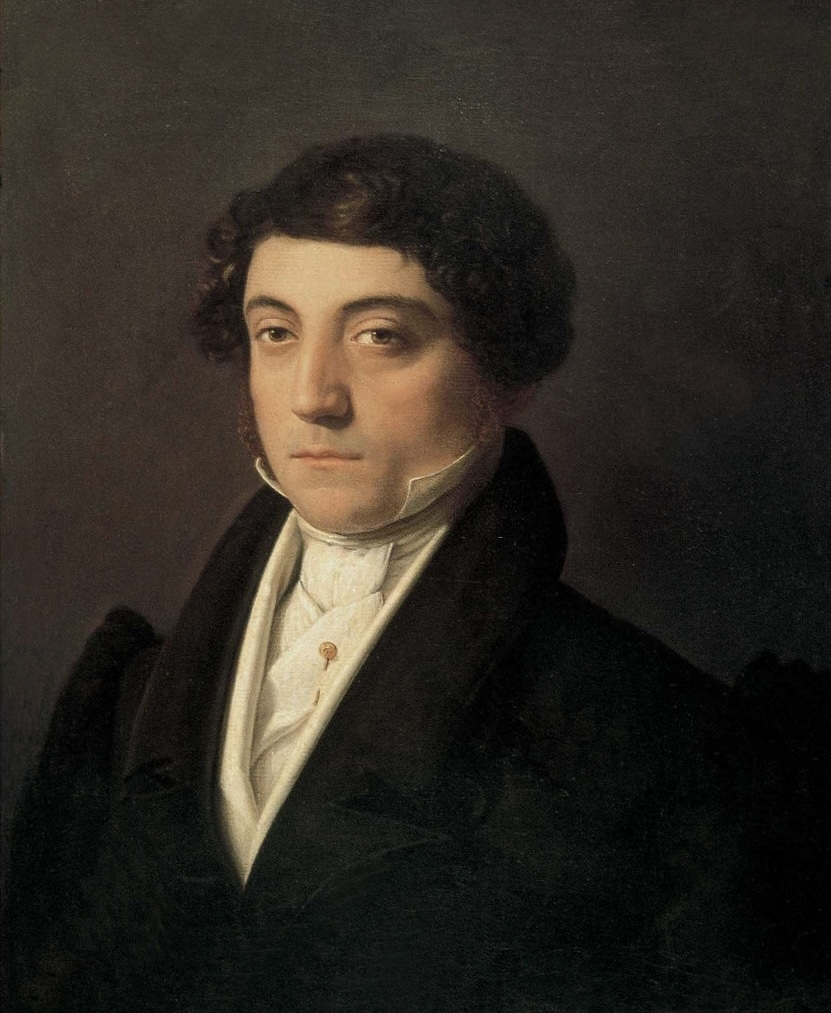
- Portrait of the composer
- Librettist: Andrea Leone Tottola
- Language: Italian
- Based on: Jean Racine's Andromaque
- Premiere: 27 March 1819; Teatro di San Carlo, Naples

Ermione (1819) is a tragic opera (azione tragica) in two acts by Gioachino Rossini to an Italian libretto by Andrea Leone Tottola, based on the play Andromaque by Jean Racine.

== Performance history ==
19th century

Ermione was first performed at the Teatro di San Carlo, Naples, on 27 March 1819. For reasons that are as yet unclear, the opera was withdrawn on 19 April after only seven performances, and was not seen again until over a hundred years after Rossini's death. One possible explanation for its failure might be Rossini's choice to renounce the use of secco recitative in favour of accompanied declamation and to connect each closed number to the next in a manner reminiscent of Gluck's French operas and of Spontini (the latter was also to have a huge influence on Weber's Euryanthe, four years later).

Despite the opera's failure, Rossini seemed to be quite fond of this work and kept its manuscript, along with a few others from his Neapolitan years, until his death. The autograph score was then delivered by the widow, Olympe Pélissier, to Eugène Lecomte who entrusted it to the Bibliothèque Musée de l'Opéra de Paris. Eventually, a concert performance was given in Siena in August 1977.

In old age, when asked if he would have liked Ermione to be translated and produced on French stages, the composer is reported to have replied: "It's my little Italian Guillaume Tell; and it will not see the light of day until after my death."

20th century and beyond

The first modern staging was at the Rossini Opera Festival in Pesaro on 22 August 1987, with Montserrat Caballé, Marilyn Horne, Chris Merritt and Rockwell Blake. In Britain, a concert performance took place at the Queen Elizabeth Hall on 10 April 1992, and the first staging was at Glyndebourne on 22 May 1995. In the US, a concert performance was given at the San Francisco Opera on 26 June 1992, and the opera was first staged by Opera Omaha on 11 September 1992 in a production by Jonathan Miller.

Other stagings of Ermione in recent years have taken place in Naples (1988 and 2019), Madrid, Rome (1991), Buenos Aires (1992) and Santa Fe (2000). The New York City Opera and Dallas Opera joined together to mount a production in 2004. A concert performance of Ermione was presented at Palacio de le Ópera A Coruña in June 2015 conducted by Alberto Zedda and starring Angela Meade (Ermione), Michael Spyres (Pirro), Barry Banks (Oreste) and Marianna Pizzolato (Andromaca). The first German stage production was presented at Volkstheater Rostock on 5 March 2016 conducted by David Parry and starring Gulnara Shafigullina (Ermione), Paul Nilon (Pirro), Ashley Catling (Oreste) and Jasmin Etezadzadeh (Andromaca).

== Roles ==
Role	Voice type	Premiere Cast, 27 March 1819 (Conductor: Nicola Festa)
Ermione (Hermione), daughter of Helen and Menelaus	soprano	Isabella Colbran
Andromaca (Andromache), widow of Hector	contralto	Benedetta Rosmunda Pisaroni
Pirro, (Pyrrhus) son of Achilles and king of Epirus	tenor	Andrea Nozzari
Oreste (Orestes), son of Agamemnon	tenor	Giovanni David
Pilade (Pylades), Oreste's companion	tenor	Giuseppe Ciccimarra
Cleone, Ermione's confidante	mezzo-soprano	Maria Manzi
Fenicio, Pirro's tutor	bass	Michele Benedetti
Cefisa, Andromaca's confidante	contralto	Raffaella De Bernardis
Attalo, Pirro's confidant	tenor	Gaetano Chizzola
Astianatte (Astyanax), Andromaca's son	silent	
Lords of Epirus, Trojan prisoners, Oreste's attendants, Spartan maidens

== Synopsis ==
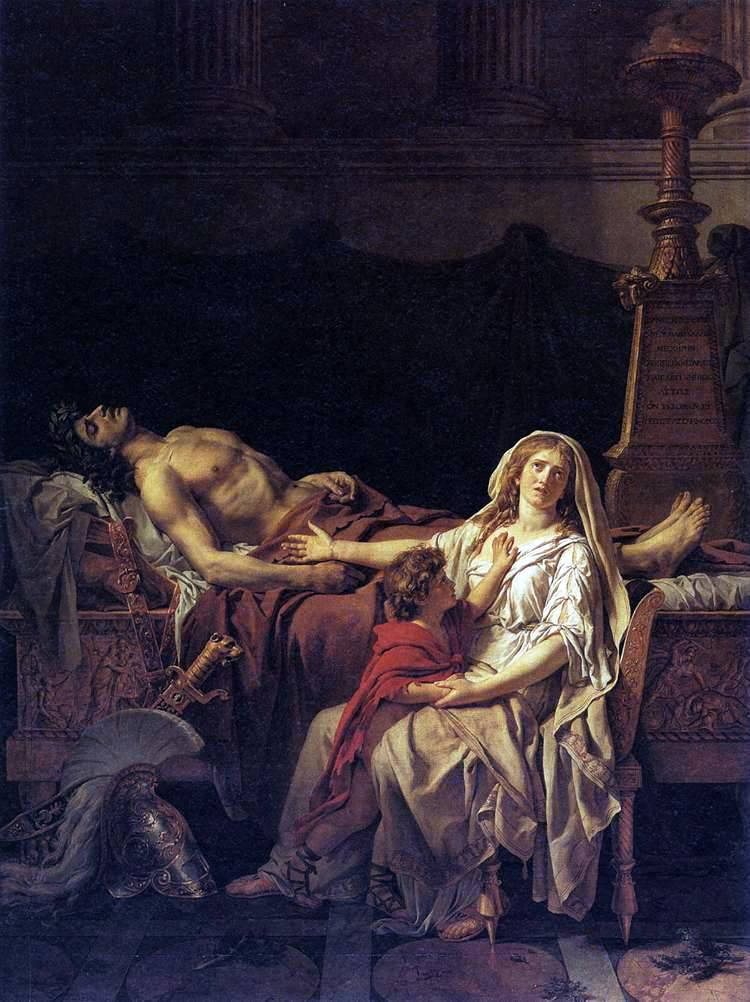
La Douleur et les Regrets d'Andromaque sur le corps d'Hector son mari, 1783

Place: In and around Pirro's palace in Epirus
Time: Soon after the Trojan War

=== Overture ===
Unusually, the overture is interrupted twice by the laments of the captive Trojans.

=== Act 1 ===
Scene 1: A dungeon in the palace

Astianatte sleeps while the prisoners continue their lament (Chorus: Troja! Qual fosti un di / "Troy! Once so great"). Andromaca arrives, escorted by Fenicio, Attalo and Cefisa, and embraces her son (Cavatina: Mia delizia! / "My only joy!"). Attalo reminds her that Astianatte will be released if she can forget Hector, her dead husband, and give in to Pirro's advances. Fenicio, fearing another outbreak of war, rebukes Attalo, and reluctantly tears Andromaca away from her son.

Scene 2: The gardens outside the palace

Cleone and some maidens invite Ermione to go hunting with them (Chorus: Dall'Oriente l'astro del giorno / "The sun is rising in the east"), but she is angry that Pirro has forsaken her and is courting Andromaca. Pirro arrives, expecting Andromaca, but she is not there. He sees Ermione and tries to escape, but she detains him and they quarrel (Duet: Non proseguir / "Say no more"). They are interrupted by a chorus of grandees, who announce the arrival of Oreste (Sul lido, di Agamennone il figlio, Oreste, è giunto / "On our shores Agamemnon's son Oreste has landed"), to Pirro's alarm and Ermione's delight. Pirro recovers and leaves to arrange Oreste's reception; meanwhile, Ermione fears that Oreste's arrival will only lead to the marriage of Pirro and Andromaca.

Scene 3: The throne room in the palace

Oreste, overwrought, appears with Pilade, who tries to calm him. He declares his unrequited love for Ermione, but Pilade tells him that he must do his duty (Cavatina and duet: Che sorda al mesto pianto ... Ah! come nascondere la fiamma vorace / "She is deaf to my tears ... Ah, how can I hide this voracious flame"). A march announces the arrival of Pirro and Ermione, attended by Fenicio, Attalo, the grandees and guards. Andromaca also enters, but stays at the back of the stage. Oreste tells Pirro that he represents all the kings of Greece, who are agreed that Astianatte must die before he is able to avenge the death of Hector, his father. Pirro defies Oreste, saying that he will do as he wishes, and that Astianatte may even share the throne with him (Aria: Balena in man del figlio l'asta di Achille ... Deh serena i mesti rai ... Non pavento: quest'alma ti sprezza / "Achilles' spear flashes in his son's hand" ... "Brighten your gloomy gaze" ... "You cannot frighten me: my soul despises you"). Andromaca and Ermione are aghast, Oreste warns Pirro that the Greeks will be angry with him, and Pilade vows that he will save Oreste from Pirro's anger.

Scene 4: The gardens outside the palace

Ermione tells Cleone that her love for Pirro has turned to hate. Oreste declares his love for Ermione, but she rejects him (Duet: Amarti? / "I? Love you?"). Pirro arrives with the grandees and his retinue, who announce that he has changed his mind and will return to Ermione (Chorus: Alfin l'Eroe da forte / "At last, the resolute hero"). Pirro then tells Oreste, to the astonishment of everyone, that he will, after all, hand over Astianatte to him. (Ermione, then the others and Pirro: Sperar, poss'io? ... A me Astianatte / "Should I, can I, hope?" ... "Bring Astianatte here") As the guards prepare to do so, Andromaca pleads with Pirro to give her time to think. Ermione is furious, and Pirro again rejects her. Andromaca vows to commit suicide if she is compelled to marry Pirro, while Pilade urges Oreste to leave with him. The Act ends in general consternation.

=== Act 2 ===
The palace's entrance hall

Andromaca arrives to tell Pirro that she will marry him. Overjoyed, he sends Attalo away to release Astianatte and make preparations for the wedding. Andromaca, unhappy, swears to herself that she will not be unfaithful to her dead husband, and while Pirro urges her to make her vows at the altar, she again resolves to kill herself (Duet: Ombra del caro sposo ... Vieni a giurar / "Ghost of my dear husband ... Come and swear at the altar").

Pirro leaves. Andromaca decides that, before she dies, she will make Pirro swear that Astianatte will be spared. Ermione, accompanied by Fenicio and Cleone, appears and insults Andromaca, who forgives her and departs. She asks Fenicio to tell Pirro that she still loves him, even if he is planning to desert her (Aria: Di, che vedesti piangere / "Tell him that you have seen my tears"). He leaves, and Cleone tells Ermione that Pirro is not worthy of her. Ermione contemplates suicide (Aria: Amata, l'amai / "I was loved and loved him").

Pirro appears in the gallery to the sound of a festive march, and he and the wedding procession pass by (Chorus: Premia, o Amore, sì bella costanza / "God of love, reward this touching constancy"). Ermione swoons, but when her maidens and friends try to comfort her, she demands revenge. Oreste enters and tells her that he still loves her. She hands him a dagger and, trembling, he leaves to avenge her. She asks the gods to strengthen his arm, while Cleone and the chorus comment on her anguish (Chorus and duet: Il tuo dolor ci affretta a consolarti ...Se l'amor mio ti è caro ... Incerto, palpitante ... Se a me nemiche stelle / "We come to console you ... If my love is dear to you" ... "Uncertain, palpitating" ... "Unless, o gods, you are my enemies"). She rushes out in a fury, followed by the others.

Fenicio and Pilade meet, predicting Pirro's downfall if he goes ahead with his marriage to Andromaca (Duettino: A così triste immagine / "Such sad imaginings"). They leave in opposite directions.

Ermione returns, extremely agitated. She does not know whether she loves or hates Pirro, and regrets ordering Oreste to kill him (Aria: Parmi, che a ogn'istante de' suoi rimorsi al grido / "I imagine that at any time he may utter a cry of remorse). Oreste appears, wild-eyed, stumbling and holding out the bloodstained dagger. He tells Ermione that she is avenged, (Duet: Sei vendicata / "You are avenged") and describes how Pirro spared Astianatte and swore to make him his heir. Surrounded by angry soldiers drawing their swords, Pirro was attacked and killed, but not by Oreste, who says that he had given the dagger to another man and then reclaimed it. Ermione accuses Oreste of murder, and he realises that she was still in love with Pirro. She asks the Eumenides to destroy Oreste.

Pilade and his sailors arrive, telling Oreste to flee with them. At first he refuses, but as Ermione tells him that she hopes that he will drown, she faints. He asks thunderbolts and death to do their worst as Pilade and the men half-carry him to their ship (Finale: Ah! Ti rinvenni / "Ah! I have found you").

== Recordings ==
Year	Cast: Ermione, Andromaca, Pirro, Oreste	Conductor, Opera House and Orchestra	Label:
1986	Cecilia Gasdia, Margarita Zimmermann, Ernesto Palacio, Chris Merritt	Claudio Scimone, Monte Carlo Philharmonic Orchestra and the Prague Philharmonic Chorus	Audio CD: Erato Records; Cat: 2292-45790
1995	Anna Caterina Antonacci, Diana Montague, Jorge López Yáñez, Bruce Ford	Andrew Davis, London Philharmonic Orchestra and the Glyndebourne Festival Chorus	DVD: Warner Music Vision; Cat: 0630 14012-2; Kultur Cat: D 2850
2008	Sonia Ganassi, Marianna Pizzolato, Gregory Kunde, Antonino Siragusa	Roberto Abbado, Teatro Comunale di Bologna Orchestra and Prague Chamber Choir (Recording of a performance in the Adriatic Arena, Pesaro, August)	Audio CD: Celestial Audio; Cat: CA 808; DVD: Dynamic; Cat: CDS 33609
2009	Carmen Giannattasio, Patricia Bardon, Paul Nilon, Colin Lee	David Parry, London Philharmonic Orchestra and the Geoffrey Mitchell Choir	Audio CD: Opera Rara; Cat: ORC42
2024	Serena Farnocchia (Ermione), Aurora Faggioli (Andromacha), Moisés Marín (Pirro), Patrick Kabongo (Oreste), Chuan Wang (Pilade)	Kraków Philharmonic Orchestra, Antonino Fogliani	ASIN : B0D217GW59
