= Otello (Rossini) =

Opera by Gioachino Rossini

- Opera by Gioachino Rossini
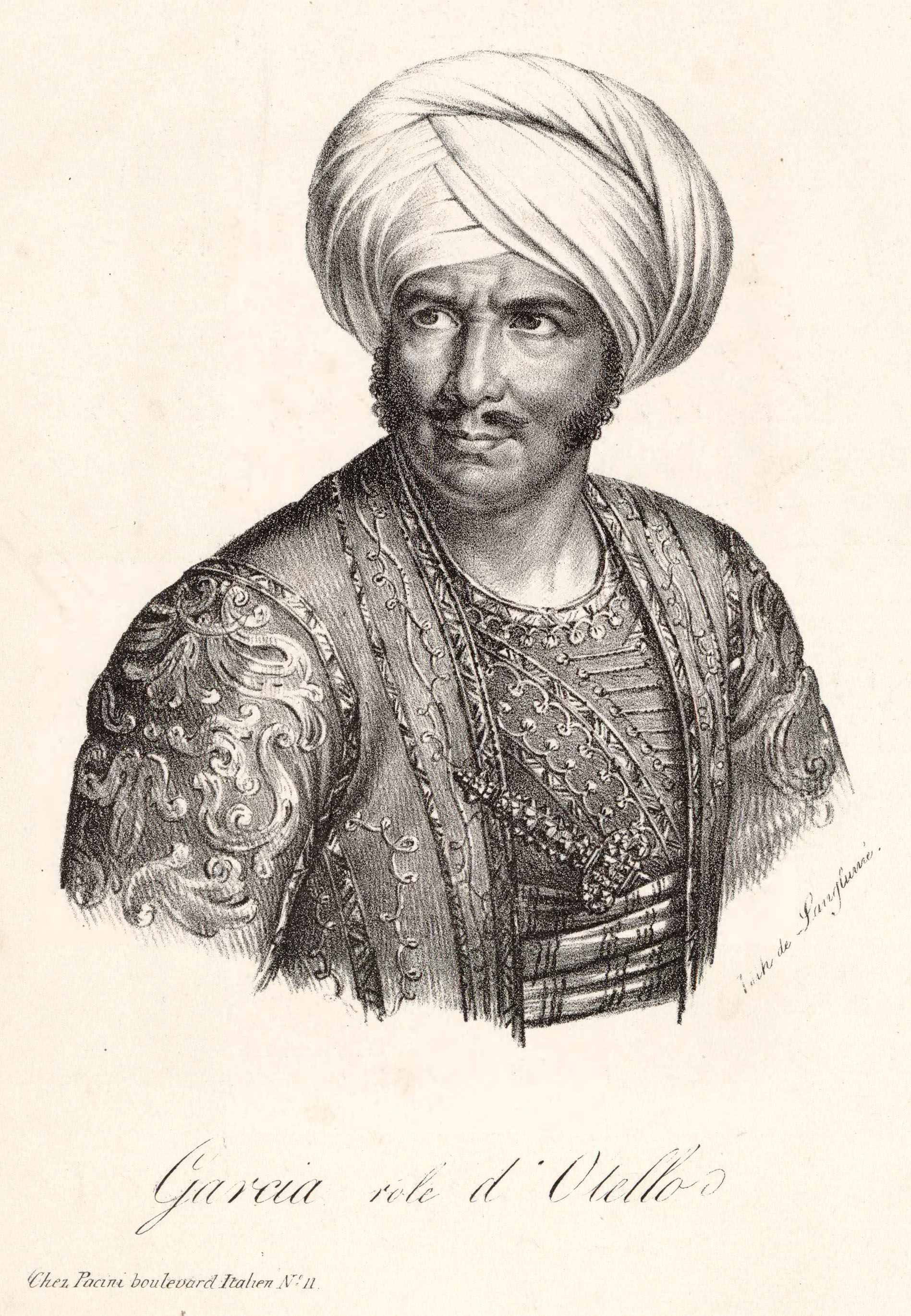
- Manuel Garcia as Otello in Paris, 1821
- Librettist: Francesco Maria Berio di Salsa
- Language: Italian
- Based on: Jean-François Ducis's play Othello, ou le More de Venise
- Premiere: 4 December 1816; Teatro del Fondo, Naples

Otello is an opera in three acts by Gioachino Rossini to an Italian libretto by Francesco Berio di Salsa. The work, which premiered in December 1816, is based on a French adaptation of the story (Othello, ou le More de Venise by Jean-François Ducis, 1792), not Shakespeare's play Othello, as neither Rossini nor his librettist knew the English drama.

The plot of the libretto differs greatly from Shakespeare's play in that it takes place wholly in Venice, not mainly on Cyprus, and the dramatic conflict develops in a different manner. The role of Iago is much less diabolical than Shakespeare's play or Verdi's 1887 opera Otello, which was also based on it. Shakespeare derived his play from the story Un Capitano Moro ("A Moorish Captain") by Cinthio, a disciple of Boccaccio, first published in 1565. In further contrast, the role of Roderigo, a sub-plot in Shakespeare and Verdi, is very prominent in Rossini's version—some of the most difficult and brilliant music being assigned to the character Rodrigo. The roles of Otello, Iago, and Rodrigo are all composed for the tenor voice.

Rossini's Otello is an important milestone in the development of opera as musical drama. It provided Verdi with a benchmark for his own adaptations of Shakespeare. A 1999 Opera Rara CD of the opera includes an alternative happy ending, a common practice with drama and opera at that period of the 19th century.

== Performance history ==
=== 19th century ===
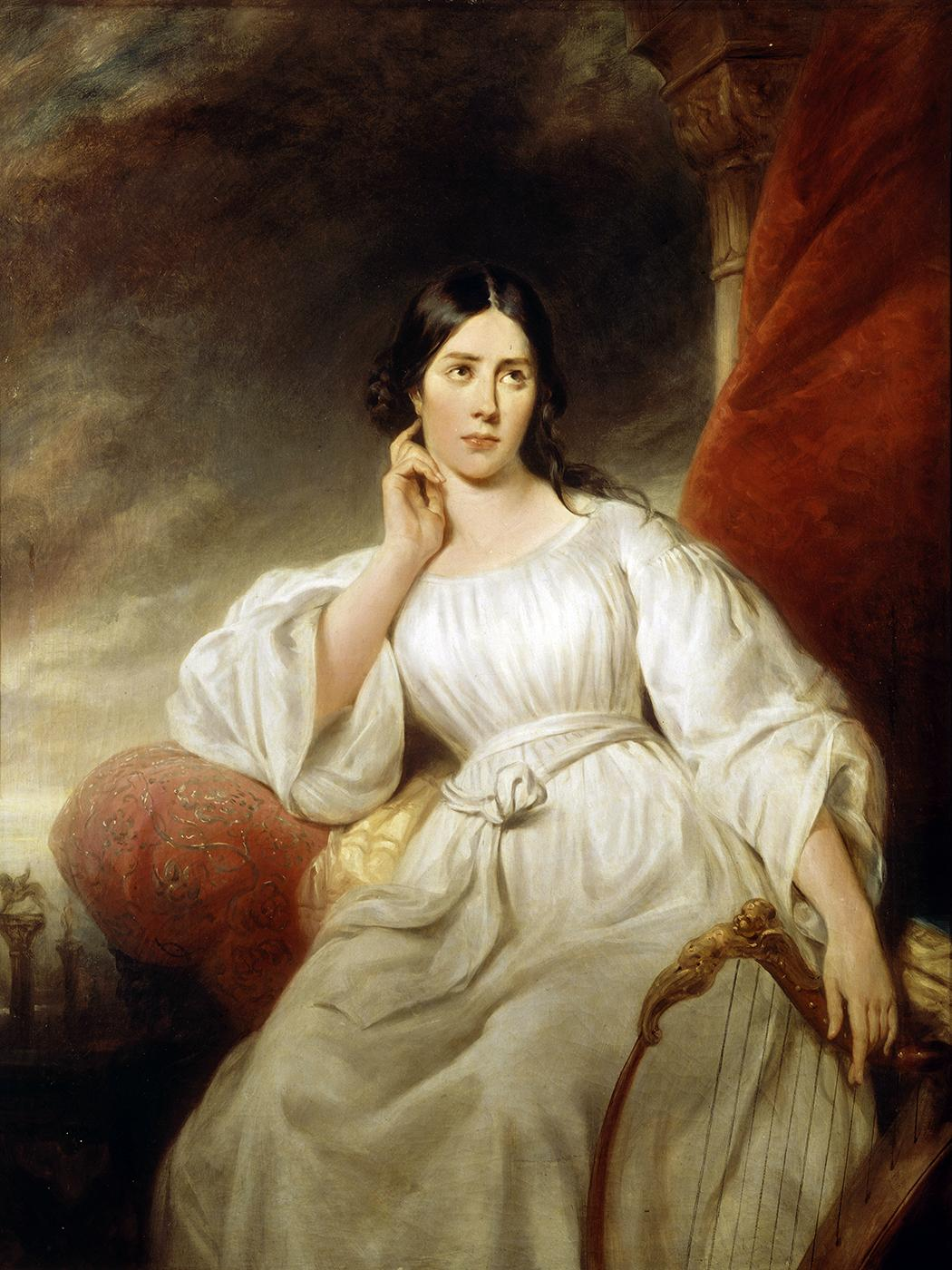
Maria Malibran as Desdemona by Henri Decaisne, 1830

The first performance took place at the Teatro del Fondo in Naples on 4 December 1816. It was first performed in Paris on 5 June 1821 at the Théâtre Italien (with Manuel García as Otello and Giuditta Pasta as Desdemona), in London on 16 May 1822 at the King's Theatre, and in New York on 7 February 1826 at the Park Theatre.

The role of Iago is indicated in the early scores as that of a tenor and was taken up in the early years by tenors Ciccimarra, Luigi Campitelli and Domenico Reina. Yet curiously, only three years after the premiere, Rossini adapted the role for the baritone voice and it was frequently sung thereafter by baritones, including the most renowned bel canto-era "secondo basso cantante", transitional baritones, and practicing Verdian baritones of the 19th century. During this period, Iago was assigned to the Italian sometimes-second-tenor, sometimes-baritone Giovanola at the Théâtre Italien in Paris on 26 July 1823 with Giuditta Pasta as Desdemona. The Spanish baritone (later pedagogue) Manuel García, Jr. sang the role on his family's trip to New York in 1826. The Italian baritone Ferdinando Lauretti sang it at Verona in 1827 and a review of this performance was dispatched to London's The Harmonicon, which mentions his "character of Iago, a part for a bass which was greatly improved by Rossini, during his engagement at your Italian opera." Domenico Cosselli sang the role at Turin's Teatro d'Angennes in 1828, as did the Italian primo basso Federico Crespi (1833), Antonio Tamburini (from 1834), Luciano Fornasari (in 1844), Giovanni Belletti (in 1849), Joseph Tagliafico in 1850, Giorgio Ronconi (from 1851), Francesco Graziani (from 1869), and Antonio Cotogni (in 1869). French baritone Paul Barroilhet appeared in 1844 in Paris, where he interpolated the aria "" (transposed from C to B-flat) from Rossini's La donna del lago. His successor, Jean-Baptiste Faure, sang the role in 1871.

A French printed edition from 1823 shows Iago's part written in the bass clef.

=== 20th century and beyond ===
After a long period of relative neglect, in the late 20th century the opera began once more to appear on the world's stages. A production by Pier Luigi Pizzi was given at the Rossini Opera Festival in Pesaro in 1988. The same production was performed at the Royal Opera House, Covent Garden, in 2000 with Bruce Ford, Mariella Devia, Juan Diego Flórez and Kenneth Tarver in leading roles. The opera received its premiere recording in 1978, with a cast headed by José Carreras and Frederica von Stade under the direction of Jesús López Cobos for Philips Records. Despite the relatively small discography of the opera in its entirety, the overture has been recorded multiple times, by artists including Sir Neville Marriner, Riccardo Chailly, Christian Benda and Donato Renzetti. The French conductor Antonio de Almeida also recorded ballet music from the opera in 1976 for Philips Records.

In October 2012, Opera Southwest in Albuquerque, New Mexico, presented three performances of the opera. The first gave both the original and the alternative "happy" ending. Prior to the second performances, the audience voted for the ending they preferred, and the chosen version was then performed. Also in 2012, the opera was staged in Zürich by the Vlaamse Opera. The same production was given in Ghent and Antwerp in February and March 2014. Buxton Festival presented the opera in concert form in July 2014.

Otello was performed in a production at the Theater an der Wien and the Oper Frankfurt in 2019, with Enea Scala in the title role, cast by Damiano Michieletto as a successful Muslim Arab in today's Venetian business world, with Karolina Makuła and Nino Machaidze as Desdemona.

== Roles ==
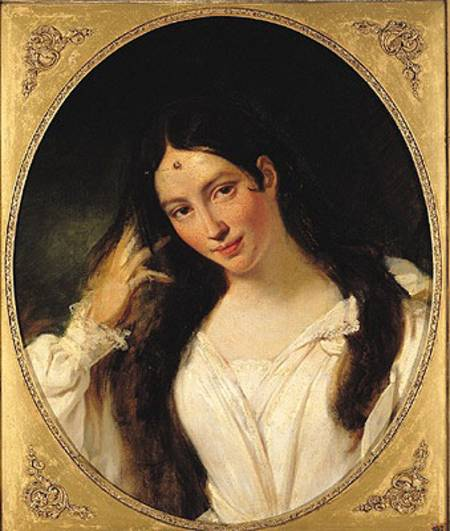
Maria Malibran as Desdemona by François Bouchot (1834)

Roles, voice types, premiere cast
Role	Voice type	Premiere cast, 4 December 1816
Otello	tenor	Andrea Nozzari
Desdemona	soprano	Isabella Colbran
Rodrigo	tenor	Giovanni David
Iago	tenor	Giuseppe Ciccimarra
Emilia	soprano	Maria Manzi
Elmiro (Brabantio)	bass	Michele Benedetti
The Doge of Venice	tenor	Gaetano Chizzola
Lucio	tenor	Nicola Mollo
A gondolier	tenor	Nicola Mollo

== Synopsis ==
Place: Venice
Time: End of the 15th Century

According to the booklet of the performances of 1818 in Milan:

Otello, an African in the service of Adria (Venice), returns victorious from a battle against the Turks. He secretly weds Desdemona, daughter of his enemy Elmiro Patrizio Veneto, already promised to Rodrigo, son of the Doge. Jago, another lover rejected by Desdemona and secret enemy of Otello, in order to be revenged for wrongs done to him, pretends to favor the love-suit of Rodrigo. He intercepts a letter by the latter, with which he leads Otello to believe his wife unfaithful, which is the basis for the action, which ends with Otello stabbing Desdemona to death, and the death of Otello himself, after discovering the deceit of Jago and the innocence of his wife.

As in Verdi's Otello, Desdemona's aria "Salce" ("Willow Song") is a pivotal moment in the final act.

== Related works ==
- The Duetto buffo di due gatti draws principally from excerpts of this opera.
- Franz Liszt based the Canzone from the Années de pèlerinage, supplement Venezia e Napoli, on the offstage gondolier's song "Nessun maggior dolore" from this opera.

== Recordings ==
Year	Cast: Otello, Desdemona, Iago, Rodrigo	Conductor, Opera house and orchestra	Label
1978	José Carreras, Frederica von Stade, Gianfranco Pastine, Salvatore Fisichella	Jesús López Cobos, Ambrosian Opera Chorus, Philharmonia Orchestra	CD: Philips; Cat: 432 456-2; For details, see here
1988	Chris Merritt, June Anderson, Ezio Di Cesare, Rockwell Blake	John Pritchard, Orchestra and Chorus of RAI Torino (Video recording of a performance in the Rossini Opera Festival, Pesaro, August)	DVD: Encore; DVD 2223
1999	Bruce Ford, Elizabeth Futral, Juan José Lopera, William Matteuzzi	David Parry, Philharmonia Orchestra and the Geoffrey Mitchell Choir	CD: Opera Rara; Cat: ORC 18
2008	Michael Spyres, Jessica Pratt, Giorgio Trucco, Filippo Adami	Antonino Fogliani, Virtuosi Brunensis and the Transilvania Philharmonic Choir (Recorded at a performance at the Rossini in Wildbad festival)	CD: Naxos Records, Cat: 8.660275-76
2012	John Osborn, Cecilia Bartoli, Edgardo Rocha, Javier Camarena	Muhai Tang, Orchestra La Scintilla, Zürich Opera, (Recording of a performance in March)	Blu-ray Disc: Decca, Cat: 074 3865
2015	Gregory Kunde, Carmen Romeu, Robert McPherson, Maxim Mironov	Alberto Zedda, Vlaamse Opera orchestra and chorus	CD:Dynamic; Cat:CDS7711
