= Bruce Ford (tenor) =

American operatic tenor

Bruce Ford (born August 15, 1956) is an American operatic tenor, particularly associated with Mozart roles and the bel canto repertory.

Ford was born in Lubbock, Texas, and studied at Texas Tech University, the University of Texas, and later as a member of the Houston Grand Opera Studio in Houston, where he created Philip Glass's The Madrigal Opera in 1981.

He left for Europe, where he made his official operatic debut in Wuppertal in 1983, as Belmonte and Tamino, then in Mannheim in 1985, as Ferrando and Don Ramiro. In 1985, he also appeareared at the Grand Théâtre de Bordeaux as Almaviva, and the Aix-en-Provence Festival, as Lindoro.

He began specializing in the bel canto repertory notably Rossini, appearing at the Pesaro Festival and the Wexford Festival in roles such as Argirio in Tancredi, Uberto in La donna del lago, Rinaldo in Armida, Agorante in Ricciardo e Zoraide, Antenore in Zelmira, Erisso in Maometto II, Oreste and Pirro in Ermione, etc.

In 1991, he sang in Mitridate, re di Ponto at the Royal Opera House in London. He also appeared at La Monnaie in Brussels, at La Scala in Milan, the Vienna State Opera, the Metropolitan Opera in New York, etc.

In the 1990s, he began a long collaboration with Opera Rara, appearing in numerous concert performances and recordings of rare operas by Donizetti, Mercadante, Mayr, Meyerbeer, and Pacini.

In 2007, he performed the title role in Otello for the Washington Concert Opera, an opera organization which produces rare operas that might otherwise not be heard.

Notable recordings include; Le domino noir, Rosmonda d'Inghilterra, Maria de Rudenz, Margherita d'Anjou, Carlo di Borgogna, Maria, regina d'Inghilterra, Zoraida di Granata, Il crociato in Egitto, Pia de' Tolomei, Elisabetta, regina d'Inghilterra, Otello, etc.

== Sources ==
- Le guide de l'opéra, Roland Mancini & Jean-Jacques Rouveroux, (Fayard, 1995) ISBN 2-213-59567-4

Biography from Opera Rara

https://opera-rara.com/artist/bruce-ford
