= Michele Benedetti =

Michele Benedetti may refer to:

- Michele Benedetti (bass) (1778–after 1828), Italian bass
- Michele Benedetti (diver) (born 1984), Italian diver
