= La donna del lago =

1819 opera by Gioachino Rossini

- Opera by Gioachino Rossini
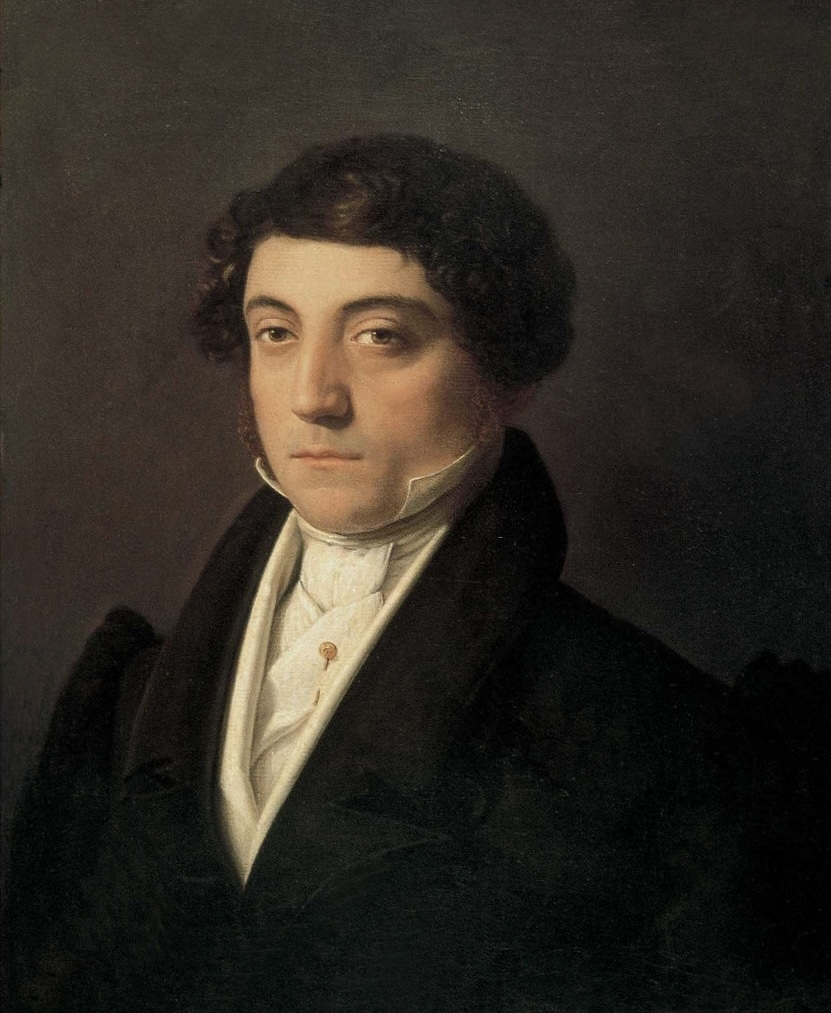
- Portrait of the composer
- Translation: The Lady of the Lake
- Librettist: Andrea Leone Tottola
- Language: Italian
- Based on: The Lady of the Lake by Sir Walter Scott
- Premiere: 24 September 1819; Teatro San Carlo, Naples

La donna del lago (English: The Lady of the Lake) is an opera composed by Gioachino Rossini with a libretto by Andrea Leone Tottola (whose verses are described as "limpid" by one critic) based on the French translation of The Lady of the Lake, a narrative poem written in 1810 by Sir Walter Scott, whose work continued to popularize the image of the romantic Scottish Highlands. Scott's basic story has been noted as coming from "the hint of an incident stemming from the frequent custom of James V, the King of Scotland, of walking through the kingdom in disguise".

It was the first of the Italian operas to be based on Scott's romantic works, and marked the beginning of romanticism in Rossini's work. Scott was "deeply influential in the development of Italian romantic opera" to the extent that by 1840 (barely 20 years after this opera), there were 25 Italian operas based on his works, the most famous being Donizetti's Lucia di Lammermoor of 1835. Others in German, French and English followed.

Written for the Teatro San Carlo in Naples, this was the seventh of nine operas which Rossini wrote for that house between 1815 and 1822. Although the première on 24 September 1819 was not a success, there followed many performances throughout major European venues (as well as being presented in Cuba and by major South American houses) until about 1860, after which the opera disappeared until 1958. In modern times, performances have been given fairly frequently.

== Composition history ==
The period between La gazza ladra (1817) and Semiramide (1823) was marked by the creation of 12 operas, among them several masterpieces composed for the San Carlo in Naples, including La donna del lago, in which Rossini brilliantly explores and innovates upon the form of opera seria. After being obliged to leave Pesaro hurriedly in May 1819 (it turned out to be his last visit there), Rossini returned to Naples in early June with no projects in the offing, except to become involved with overseeing a new production of his La gazza ladra there. Also, a commission from Milan's La Scala for an opera, which would become Bianca e Falliero, had been offered and was planned for December of that year. Suddenly, the Italian composer Gaspare Spontini withdrew from a commitment to write two operas for the Naples house that season, thus leaving a huge gap. Rossini was quickly asked to write an opera for a September premiere; rather than use an existing libretto, the house insisted upon a wholly new opera and he accepted the challenge.

It seems Rossini was initially attracted to Scott's poem when, in musicologist Philip Gossett's opinion, he was introduced to it in translation by the young French composer Désiré-Alexandre Batton, a student of his and Prix de Rome winner then in Italy. On hearing about the poem from Batton, Rossini asked for a copy and within a few days informed Batton he was so delighted with it he would compose an opera based on it. He then immediately called upon the Naples-based librettist Andrea Leone Tottola (who is described as "a comparative mediocrity when set against the likes of a Felice Romani)". Later, the librettist claimed the topic for "this difficult task" had been chosen by the Naples impresario.

As he worked on the libretto, Tottola "was also intrigued by the epic Celtic tales of Ossian" published in 1760 by James Macpherson, who claimed to have found poems written by an ancient bard. The published translations acquired international popularity and set off a craze for idealising and romanticizing the Scottish Highlands. Napoleon and Thomas Jefferson read the Ossian poems, Goethe included them in The Sorrows of Young Werther, and Schubert and Mendelssohn both composed music to them. The young Walter Scott was also greatly influenced by them.

Initially, Tottola was well aware of the difficulties which he faced in reducing Scott's epic poem, with its detailed descriptions of the Scottish landscape and culture as well as its many characters. In his preface, the librettist summed it up by stating:

It is, in fact, no easy task to simplify the many beauties and many moments of interest of a poem in order to arrive at the regular conduct of a drama and to observe the strict laws of the stage. It therefore became unavoidable that I should make some arbitrary changes in the original ...

But together, composer and librettist, reflecting the poetic meter of the Ossian tales, "strove to interweave a sense of these very rhythms into the score and libretto." Richard Osborne describes what they accomplished:

It is astonishing what he and Tottola achieved in so short a time: a complex and sophisticated theatrical structure, an unusually rich vein of dramatically viable melody, exquisite orchestrations, and a striking use of the kind of off-stage effects Rossini had been experimenting with in the royal pageants of Ricciardo e Zoraide.

Osborne also notes the way in which "the source materials have been interwoven, giving the sense of a music drama that has in some measure been 'through-composed'." Gossett is less enthusiastic, noting that "it is almost impossible for Italian poetry to capture the quality of Scott's characteristic verse," but he does agree that "the spirit of the poem is there".

With the original September deadline missed, the new opera was presented in October and "was an enormous success", although it was not without some early disruptions from the audience.

The opera is best considered as a transitional work between baroque and classical forms and romanticism. It was the first and also the last but one en travesti opera that Rossini would write for Naples, the last one being Maometto secondo. Due to the influence of the French style during the reigns of Joseph Bonaparte and Joachim Murat, tenors had substituted castrati and contraltos for heroic roles there.

== Performance history ==
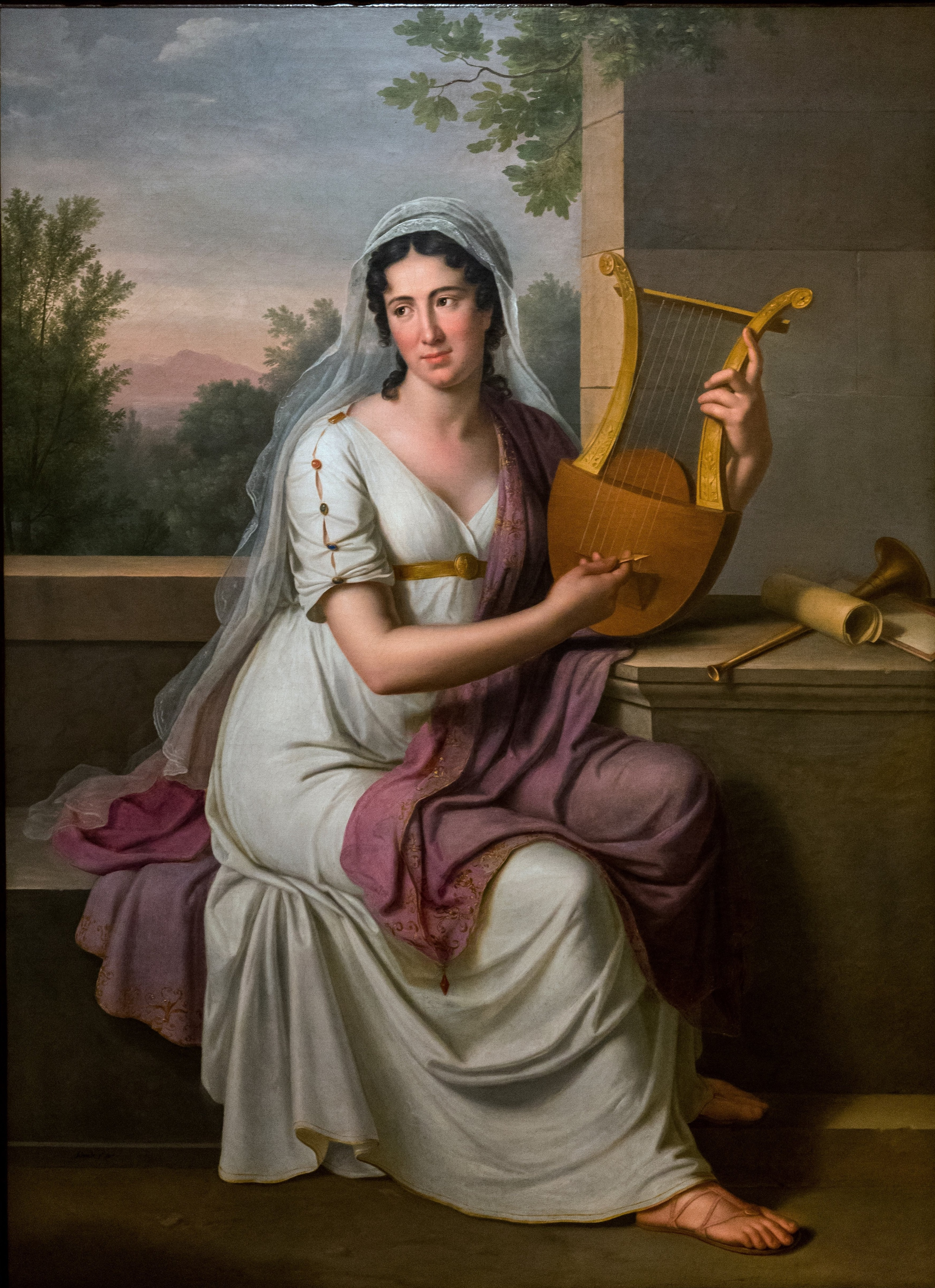
Soprano Isabella Colbran, the first Elena

Contralto Benedetta Rosmunda Pisaroni, the first Malcolm

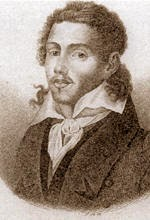
Tenor Giovanni David, the first Uberto

=== Première ===
The opera received its première on 24 September 1819, with a debut cast of seasoned singers who regularly worked together, including Isabella Colbran as Elena, Benedetta Rosmunda Pisaroni as Malcolm and Giovanni David as Uberto/King James.

Initial reactions were mixed, with the conservative faction displeased by its seeming elaborateness and concerted numbers compared to the simplicity of Ricciardo e Zoraide the previous year. A contemporary account of the evening's events reveals that, in the absence of members of the royal court, there were disruptions. A. Azevedo, in his 1864 book on the composer, notes that "the public found itself free of all restraint [....] the audience whistled and booed, and challenged both artists and composer throughout almost the entire evening." However, he does state that after the brilliance of Colbran's rondo finale, they were very enthusiastic and called her onto the stage many times, as they did Rossini (who had refused to appear and had already left for Milan, where he was under contract to compose Bianca e Falliero.).

=== 19th century ===
Despite the opera's initial poor reception in Naples, on arrival in Milan, Rossini announced it was an unqualified success, which as it happens, it then proceeded to be. La donna remained in the San Carlo's repertoire for 12 years, up to the 1834/35 season. It was performed in London in February 1823 and was staged for 15 seasons until 1851, while it had its American debut in New Orleans in June 1829 followed by New York in 1833.

Many major cities in Italy, several in Spain, as well as St. Petersburg and many South American houses saw productions up to 1860, when there was a performance in Trieste. After that it disappeared.

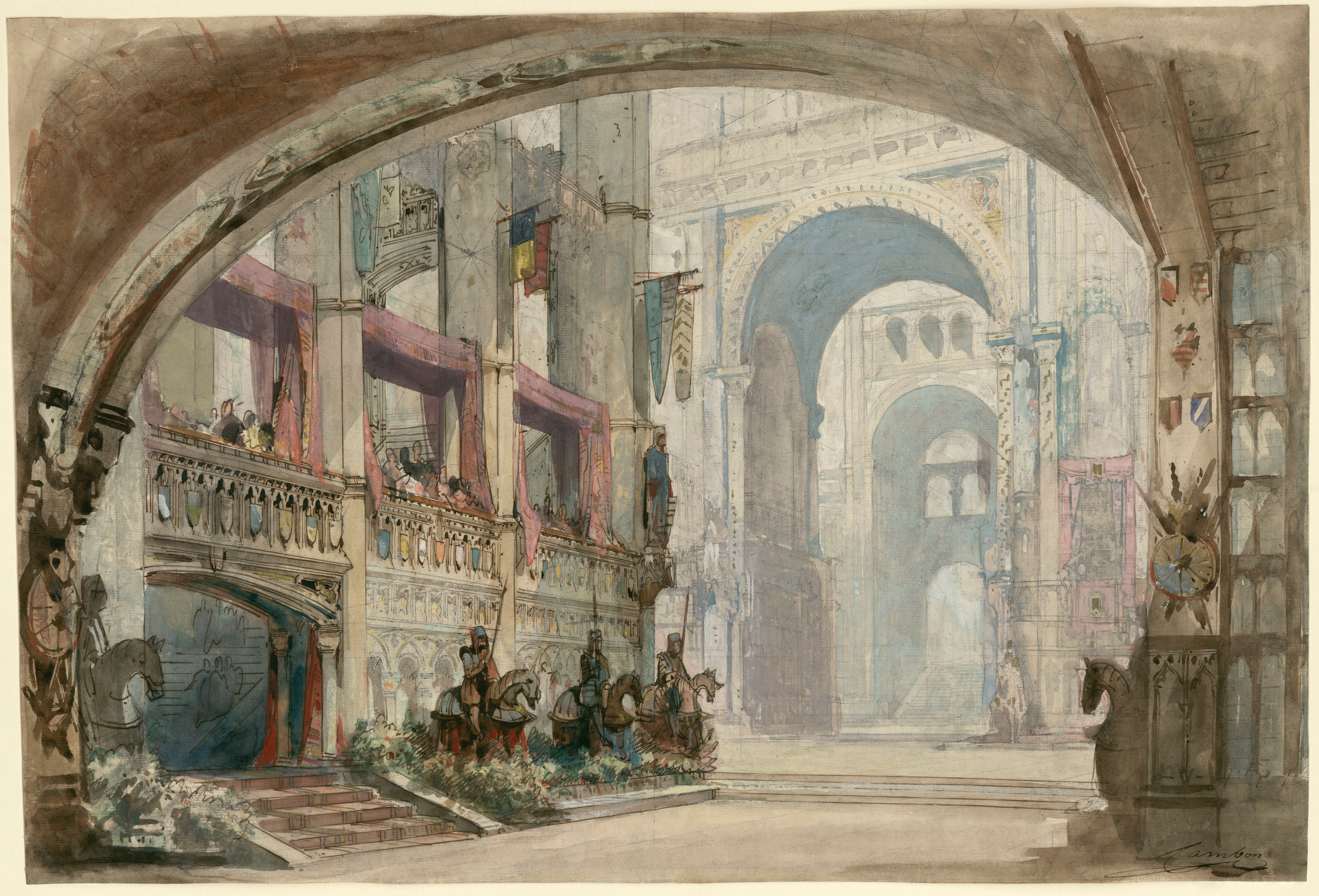
Set design for Act III, Scene 3 of Robert Bruce, a French-language pasticcio based heavily on La donna del lago

Although not staged at the Opéra, La donna was seen in Paris for 13 seasons between 1824 and 1854. While Rossini was living there, he was approached by the director of the Opéra, Léon Pillet, in 1846, with a request to write a new work. Rossini declined, because the company had never performed La donna. Pillet therefore began collaborating with the composer Louis Niedermeyer and librettist Gustave Vaëz to change the story of La donna to a different time and incorporate elements from another Scott work; eventually, with Rossini's blessing, they also added music from Zelmira and Armida, amongst others. This "pasticcio", Robert Bruce, was given on 30 December 1846 and “throughout the winter, to appreciative audiences".

=== 20th century and beyond ===
La donna went unperformed for almost a century until 1958, when a revival took place in Florence, where it was also recorded in performance at the Teatro della Pergola during the Maggio Musicale on 9 May. Ten years later, it was presented at the 1969 Camden Festival in London, with Kiri Te Kanawa in the lead role.

In 1981, after an absence from America of almost 150 years, a production was mounted by the Houston Grand Opera, starring Frederica von Stade, Marilyn Horne, and Rockwell Blake, and conducted by Claudio Scimone. The same production and cast were later presented at Covent Garden. In 1981, the Rossini Opera Festival at Pesaro presented the first staging of H. Colin Slim's new critical edition starring Lella Cuberli and Philip Langridge. The same production was revived in 1983 with Katia Ricciarelli, Lucia Valentini Terrani and Samuel Ramey.

A variety of European and American companies - about 25 in all - performed the opera from the 1960s into the early 2000s, and recordings of many of these exist, including a concert performance in the Théâtre du Châtelet, Paris, on 2 March 1986. 1990 saw Cecilia Gasdia and Rockwell Blake in a performance in the Teatro Regio di Parma in January 1990.

In 1992, to mark the bicentenary of Rossini's birth, La Scala mounted its first production of the opera in 150 years, with a cast that included bel canto experts June Anderson, Rockwell Blake, and Chris Merritt, directed by Werner Herzog and conducted by Riccardo Muti. Anna Caterina Antonacci starred in a concert performance in the Concertgebouw, Amsterdam, on 28 March 1992.

Juan Diego Flórez sang the role of Uberto in a performance in the Palafestival, Pesaro in August 2001, repeating that role in 2002 (with Malcolm sung by Daniela Barcellona) at the Opéra Berlioz-Le Corume on 23 July with the orchestra of the Rome Opera. Both Florez and Barcellona appeared in the Kleines Festspielhaus in Salzburg in August, with Ruth Ann Swenson as Elena and Bruce Fowler (tenor) as Rodrigo.

2003 saw a concert performance under Eve Queler given by the Opera Orchestra of New York on 19 May. Elena was sung by Ruth Ann Swenson, Malcolm by Stephanie Blythe and Rodrigo by Bruce Fowler (tenor). A concert performance was also given as part of the Edinburgh Festival at Usher Hall, on 18 August 2006.

The Paris Opera staged its first production of the work in June 2010 at the Palais Garnier with a cast headed by Rossini specialists Joyce DiDonato as Elena and Juan Diego Flórez as King James/Uberto. The production by Luís Pasqual was conducted by Roberto Abbado. This production travelled from Paris to La Scala in October 2011, omitting the balletic elements.

The opera, featuring some of the Paris cast, was given by The Royal Opera, Covent Garden in the Spring of 2013. The production, by John Fulljames, was conducted by Michele Mariotti. A new co-production with the Metropolitan Opera was presented on 13 July 2013 by The Santa Fe Opera as part of its festival season, also starring Joyce DiDonato, with Lawrence Brownlee as Uberto/The King, Marianna Pizzolato as Malcolm, René Barbera as Rodrigo and Wayne Tigges as Douglas. The Metropolitan Opera's première of this opera began on 16 February 2015 with a similar cast to La Scala, but a new production, including DiDonato as Elena and Juan Diego Flórez as Uberto.

== Roles ==
Role	Voice type	Premiere Cast, 24 October 1819 (Conductor: Gioachino Rossini)
Elena (Ellen), Lady of the Lake	soprano	Isabella Colbran
Malcom (Malcolm) Groeme (Graeme), Rebel chieftain, Elena's lover (en travesti)	contralto	Benedetta Rosmunda Pisaroni
Uberto di Snowdon, alias of Giacomo V, Re di Scozia (King James V of Scotland) Enamoured of Elena	tenor	Giovanni David
Duglas (Douglas) d'Angus, Elena's father, rebel and former tutor to King James	bass	Michele Benedetti
Rodrigo (Roderick) di Dhu, Rebel chief of the Highlanders, betrothed to Elena	tenor	Andrea Nozzari
Serano, Douglas's retainer	tenor	Gaetano Chizzola
Albina, Elena's confidante	mezzo-soprano	Maria Manzi
Bertram, Servant to the King	bass	Massimo Orlandini
Chorus: Pastori, Pastorelle scozzesi, Bardi, Grandi di Scozia, Dame scozzesi, Guerrieri del Clan Alpino, Cacciatori, Guardie reali Scottish shepherds and shepherdesses, bards, Scottish nobles and their ladies, Highland warriors, hunters, royal guards

== Instrumentation ==
The instrumentation is:

- Woodwinds: 2 flutes, 2 oboes, 2 clarinets in Bes and 2 bassoons.
- Brass: 2 trumpets, 2 horns in E♭, 3 trombones.
- Percussion: 2 timpani (E♭ and B♭), bass drum.
- Strings: 1 harp, first violins, second violins, violas, violoncellos and double basses.

== Synopsis ==
Scotland under King James V (reigned 1513–1542) was in a state of unrest. Amongst the rebels were Douglas (Elena's father), Rodrigo (to whom she has been betrothed) and Malcolm (whom she loves). The King is in the habit of going about his lands disguised as Uberto. Seeing Elena he instantly falls in love with her, but she repels his advances stating that he is confusing hospitality and friendship for romantic interest. In the meantime he has realised that she is related to his enemies. The clans gather to overthrow the king, and Rodrigo and Douglas discover Elena's secret love for Malcolm. She tries to keep the peace, but the call to arms diverts the soldiers. The battle does not go well, and Rodrigo is killed. Again the king in disguise encounters Elena and gives her a ring to take to the king if she is ever in trouble. She decides to use it and goes to Stirling Castle where she finds that both Malcolm and Douglas are prisoners. She pleads their cases, and the king magnanimously pardons them and blesses the union, now unimpeded by Rodrigo, between Elena and Malcolm.

== Plot ==
Place: Scotland
Time: First half of the sixteenth century

=== Act 1 ===
Scene 1: The shores of Loch Katrine, with the Ben Ledi mountains in the background (Note: Some libretti divide the action into much smaller scenes, ten in the first act and seven in the second)

Shepherds are watching flocks at dawn on the shore and men in the nearby forests are hunting (Chorus: Del dì la messaggiera già il crin di rose infiora / "It is the day of the harvest and rose tresses are fully blossomed). Elena appears in a boat on the lake and sings of her longing for her true love, Malcolm (Cavatina: Oh mattutini albori| vi ha preceduti Amor / "Love has preceded you, to awake me again from my slumbers"). At the edge of the lake, Elena hears the sound of horns and vainly hopes that Malcolm will be among the hunters. However, King James - who has disguised himself as "Uberto" in the hope of meeting the beautiful Elena - approaches from a distance, claiming to be a lost hunter. She offers him shelter and James accepts, and the two cross the lake towards Elena's home (Duettino: Scendi nel piccol legno / "Get into my little boat"). As they sail off, the men in his entourage arrive, searching for the disguised King (Chorus: Uberto! Ah! dove t'ascondi? / "Oberto, where are you hiding?"). Frustrated, they agree to widen the search and pray for guidance in finding their leader.

Scene 2: Douglas's home

Arriving at her home, Elena explains her simple life. But Uberto/King James sees insignias of his ancestors and learns that Elena's father is Douglas, the King's tutor, who has since become a rebel exiled from the court, a decision which Uberto in an aside says the King regrets. Elena's friends arrive and sing of her betrothal by her father to Rodrigo, chief of the Highlanders, a Scots tribe opposed to King James. Uberto/James becomes jealous. However, he suspects that Elena is not in love with Rodrigo (Duet: Le mie barbare vicende / "What good will it do to hear about my cruel fortunes?"). Directly, he asks if there is someone she loves, and learns this was only a brief episode in her past. Encouraged, he prepares to leave Elena's house (Duet: Cielo! in qual estasi! / "Heavens, I feel myself transported in ecstasy"), and he and Elena expresses similar emotions. All leave as Elena goes inside.

Malcolm arrives, having decided to join the Highlanders (Mura felici, ove il mio ben si aggira! / Dopo più lune io vi riveggo / "Happy walls, that shelter my beloved. After so long I will see her again!"). Alone, he recalls fond memories of Elena: (Aria: Elena! oh tu, che chiamo!, Deh vola a me un istante / "Elena! you whom I call!, Ah!, fly back to me for a moment, come back to me and say I love you"). Then he swears he will take her away from the strongest man or die in the attempt. Unseen, Malcolm then watches Elena and her father discussing her upcoming marriage to Rodrigo. She is reluctant, but Douglas orders her to obey his command: (Aria: Taci, lo voglio, e basti / "Be quiet! It is my wish...Show me that you're a daughter worthy of her father"). As he leaves, trumpets announce Rodrigo; Douglas orders Elena to follow him.

Malcolm, who has overheard the conversation, approaches Elena and they pledge their undying devotion to each other (Duettino: Vivere io non saprò/ potrò, mio ben, senza di te / (Elena, then Malcolm): "Beloved, I shall not be able to live, my love, without you"). Together they leave.

Scene 3

The Highland warriors urge one another to fight (Chorus: Qual rapido torrente / "Like a swift-flowing stream, surging over obstacles in its way") and welcome Rodrigo. He pledges to lead them to victory but, aside, expresses anxiety to see his future bride: (Cavatina: Eccomi a voi, miei prodi / "I come to you my brave honor of the native soil"). His soldiers assure him he will win the hand of the woman he loves, as well as military victory.

Douglas enters and he and Rodrigo greet one another, the latter fervently expressing his desire to see Elena. (Rodrigo and Chorus: Ma dov'è colei / "But where is Elena, who kindles such a sweet flame in my breast"). Acclaimed by the assembled crowd for her beauty, Elena enters. Rodrigo approaches, declaring his love: (Aria: Quanto a quest'alma amante / "My loving soul finds the sweetness of this moment"). Concerned that she does not appear to respond, Douglas assures Rodrigo that she is restrained by modesty. Father, daughter and suitor each express their hopes, concerns and fears: (Trio: Di opposti affetti un vortice / "A whirlwind of contrary emotions, Swirls about me").

Malcolm and his men arrive to join the Highlanders, demanding to be put to the test. Elena tries to hide her emotions, but Douglas immediately understands where her heart lies. At the same time, Rodrigo offers friendship to Malcolm and introduces Elena as his bride-to-be; but he, too, perceives a connection between Malcolm and Elena. In a quartet accompanied by the chorus of soldiers and women, each expresses his or her conflicting emotions: (Rodrigo: Crudele sospetto, Che me agiti il petto / "Cruel suspicion That sets me shuddering"; then Elena and Malcolm together: Ah cèlati, o affetto, nel misero petto! / "Ah my affection - keep yourself hidden"; then Douglas: Ah l'ira, il dispetto, mi straziano il petto! / "Ah! Anger and resentment Tear my heart apart"; finally Albina and chorus: Crudele sospetto gli serpe nel petto! / "Cruel suspicion twists Like a snake").

Abruptly, Serano enters to warn of an attack by the King's forces. The Bards (Coro dei Bardi) enter and sing Già un raggio forier d'immenso splendor, addita il sentier di gloria, di onor, in which they are then joined by Albina E vinto il nemico, domato l'audace. As Rodrigo, Malcolm and the Highland warriors prepare to depart for battle, everyone joins in singing Su... amici! guerrieri! / "Go on, friends and warriors, Go on, let's march, let's fight". All leave for battle.

=== Act 2 ===
Scene 1: A thick wood with a cave

In the woods, Uberto/King James has come to find Elena, hoping to save her from the coming battles (Cavatina: Oh fiamma soave, che l’alma mi accendi! pietosa ti rendi a un fido amator. / "Oh sweet flame. Show compassion To a faithful lover"). Meanwhile, Elena asks Serano to find her father, whom she expects to see before he goes off to fight; Serano leaves. Uberto/King James then approaches Elena and declares his love, but she tells him she loves Malcolm: (Duet, leading to a trio: Elena and Uberto: Alla ragion deh rieda / "Ah! may your agitated and overburdended soul Return to reason's control"). Nevertheless, Uberto gives Elena a ring he says the King gave him, and emphasizes that it will see her through any danger. He prepares to leave, but Rodrigo steps forward, having overheard their exchange: (Duet: Qual pena in me già desta / "What distress in my fatal misfortune"". This becomes a trio with Rodrigo's: Misere mie pupille! / "O my wretched eyes!".) Overwhelmed with rage and jealousy, Rodrigo orders his men to reveal themselves and kill this stranger. Elena pleads with Rodrigo's men, and Rodrigo decides to duel with Uberto himself. The two exit; Elena, trying in vain to calm them, follows.

Scene 2: The interior of the cave

Malcolm enters, looking for Elena, but finds only Albina. Serano joins them, explaining that Elena has gone in search of her father, Douglas, who is on a peace mission to the King's palace. Despondent at losing Elena, Malcolm seeks his own death: (Aria: Ah! si pera: ormai la morte! fia sollievo a’ mali miei / "Ah! Let me perish; death now Would be a relief for my ills. But if she comes to me she will bring eternal happiness to my life"). However, he is confronted by the arriving clansmen who announce that Rodrigo has been slain and the Highlanders face certain defeat. Malcolm leaves for the palace, determined to rescue Elena even if it means his life.

Scene 3: A room in the King's palace

Douglas begs his former student King James for forgiveness, not for himself but for his daughter and those who helped him on the field of battle. The King refuses, and orders him imprisoned. As Douglas is led away, the King is saddened by having to act so severely. Meanwhile, Elena has gained entry to the palace by showing her ring from "Uberto", and hopes to save her father, Malcolm and Rodrigo (of whose death she is unaware). Suddenly, in the next room, she hears the voice of "Uberto" expressing love for her: (Aria: Aurora! ah sorgerai avversa ognor per me? D’Elena i vaghi rai mostrarmi. / "Dawn! Ah! will you always Arise inauspiciously for me? Oh God! Why show me Elena's fair eyes?"). When "Uberto" comes in, Elena is thrilled, certain he will help her gain an interview with the King.

Scene 4: The King's Throne Room

The two enter the throne room as members of the court join them: (Chorus: Imponga il Re: noi siamo servi del suo voler / "Let the King give us his orders"). Elena, puzzled by the courtiers' behaviour towards "Uberto", suddenly she realises that Uberto and King James are one. King James, softened by his affection for Elena, decides to forgive Douglas; but he makes a show of severity by condemning Malcolm. Finally, he relents and brings the young couple together. In her rondo finale, Elena rejoices to have saved both her father and her true love, while everyone else rejoices that peace has been restored: (Rondo: Tanti affetti in tal momento! mi si fanno al core intorno, che l’immenso mio contento / "So many emotions at such moment / Come clamouring about my heart / That I cannot explain to you / My immense happiness")

== Music ==
In describing the conclusion of the first act in musical terms, Philip Gossett makes us aware that, in the stretta,:

Rossini brings all the tunes together contrapuntally, with full orchestra, three separate choruses, soloists, opera, trumpets, harp, for what is certainly the most exhilarating moment in all his operas. Whether or not it is true to Scott, it is clearly motivated by an intense desire to capture the spirit of Scott, and this desire draws Rossini down compositional paths that he has never taken before.

It is significant that Naples, for whose Teatro San Carlo the opera was written, was the scene of many innovations in the opera seria form. Given its sophisticated opera-going audience "the composer could experiment with musical and dramatic forms in ways that would have met with incomprehension elsewhere." Preceding as it did Maometto II and Zelmira, "in its variety of moods, of forms, of vocal styles, of orchestration, it [La Donna del Lago] is one of the most engaging operas Rossini ever wrote [....] and is Rossini's most tuneful opera."

In summing up the musical and creative significance of this opera in Rossini's overall career, Gossett suggests that while Malcolm's two arias and Elena's final "tanti affetti" are "bel canto" at its finest, in this opera Rossini:

embraced all musical techniques known to him, pushed into dramatic and structural territory largely uncharted in Italian opera, explored the riches of the orchestra, redefined the nature of the chorus, created, in short, a tradition to which later composers who still knew these works could only look back in awe.

Charles Osborne notes that the music of Act 2 "remains on a high level" (when compared to the structural innovations of act 1) but several aspects draw his attention. These include Oberto's "andante cavatina" which begins with Elena: Oh fiamma soave ("Oh sweet flame / That sees my breast on fire!), followed by the duet Alla ragion, deh rieda ("Ah! may your agitated and overburded soul") which then leads into a cabaletta trio with Rodrigo "the two tenors vying with each other in high-flying vocal agility", with the "winner" being Uberto with his high D. Osborne concludes by noting, as have other scholars, that this opera anticipates how the composer moved towards Guillaume Tell.

In his introductory essay in the booklet accompanying the Opera Rara recording, Jeremy Commons takes many of the above comments one step further by drawing attention to the way in which the composer takes the melody of Elena's opening cavatina (Oh mattutini albori! / "Oh rays of morning"), brings it back and into the duet with Uberto (Elena: Scendi nel piccolo legno / "Step down into my little craft"), echoes it in the orchestra when the couple arrive at the island, and then re-introduces it right at the end of act 2 when we hear Uberto singing it off-stage in the form of a canzoncina: Aurora! ah sorgerai ( "Dawn! Ah! Will you always / Arise inauspiciously for me?"). Commons explains that this linking "is evidence that Rossini was taking the first step towards a concept of an opera, not as a series of disparate items, but as an organized whole in which the parts refer back and forth to each other, adding extra resonances each time that material returns."

The aria Oh! quante lacrime finor versai, from Act I of the opera, is notable for being the basis for Rossini's "Introduction, Theme, and Variations for Clarinet and Orchestra", a staple work of the solo clarinet repertoire.

== Recordings ==
Year	Cast: Elena, Malcolm, Uberto (Giacomo), Rodrigo di Dhu	Conductor, Opera House and Orchestra	Label:
1970	Montserrat Caballé, Julia Hamari, Franco Bonisolli, Pietro Bottazzo	Piero Bellugi, Orchestra and Chorus of RAI Torino (Recording of a broadcast performance, 20 April)	Audio CD: Opera d'Oro; Cat: OPD 1206
1981	Frederica Von Stade, Marilyn Horne, Rockwell Blake, Dano Raffanti	Claudio Scimone, Houston Symphony Orchestra and Houston Grand Opera Chorus (Recording of a performance at the Houston Grand Opera, 18 October)	Audio CD: Celestial Audio; Cat: CA 417
1983	Katia Ricciarelli, Lucia Valentini Terrani, Dalmacio Gonzales, Dano Raffanti	Maurizio Pollini, The Chamber Orchestra of Europe and the Prague Philharmonic Choir	Audio CD: CBS "Masterworks", Cat: CD 39311; Fonit Cetra, Cat: CDC 31
1992	June Anderson, Martine Dupuy, Rockwell Blake, Chris Merritt,	Riccardo Muti, Teatro alla Scala Orchestra and Chorus (Recorded at performances at La Scala, June)	Audio CD: Philips; Cat: 473 307-2; DVD: Opus Arte, Cat: OALS 3009D
2006	Carmen Giannattasio, Patricia Bardon, Kenneth Tarver, Gregory Kunde	Maurizio Benini, Scottish Chamber Orchestra and the Edinburgh Festival Chorus (Recording of a concert performance in the Usher Hall, Edinburgh, 18 August)	Audio CD: Opera Rara, Cat: ORC 34
2008	Sonia Ganassi, Marianna Pizzolato, Maxim Mironov, Ferdinand von Bothmer	Alberto Zedda, SWR Radio Orchestra Kaiserslautern; Prague Chamber Choir; Recorded live at the Rossini in Wildbad Festival	Audio CD:Naxos Records; Cat:8.660235-36
2015	Joyce DiDonato, Daniela Barcellona, Juan Diego Florez, John Osborn	Michele Mariotti, Metropolitan Opera orchestra and chorus, Paul Curran, stage director	Erato Records, Cat:2564605098

== Bibliography ==
- André, Naomi (2006). Voicing gender: castrati, travesti, and the second woman in early-Nineteenth-century Italian opera. Bloomington (Ind.): Indiana University Press. ISBN 9780253217899.
- Ferguson, W. (1998). The Identity of the Scottish Nation: an Historic Quest. Edinburgh: Edinburgh University Press. ISBN 0748610715.
- Gossett, Philip & Patricia Brauner La donna del lago p. 785, in Holden (2001)
- Harewood, Earl of, ed. (1987). Kobbé's complete opera book (10th ed.). London: Bodley Head. ISBN 0370310179.
- Holden, Amanda, ed. (2001). The New Penguin Opera Guide. London: Penguin. ISBN 9780140514759.
- Hopkins, Kate (20 May 2013). "Opera Essentials: La donna del lago A quick guide to Rossini's turbulent love story". Royal Opera House.
- Lajarte, Théodore (1878), Bibliothèque musicale du Théâtre de l'Opéra, volume 2 [1793–1876]. Paris: Librairie des Bibliophiles. View at Google Books.
- Mays, Desirée (2013), Opera Unveiled: 2013. Santa Fe, NM: The Santa Fe Opera, 2013. ISBN 978-1-4675-5718-4
- Morère, P. (2004). Scotland and France in the Enlightenment. Bucknell University Press. ISBN 0838755267.
- Osborne, Charles (1994), The Bel Canto Operas of Rossini, Donizetti, and Bellini, Portland, Oregon: Amadeus Press. ISBN 0-931340-71-3
- Opera at Movie Theaters: 2014-2015 Season (includes English and Italian libretti). Opera Journeys Publishing. 2014.
- Osborne, Richard (1998), "Donna del lago, La" in Stanley Sadie, (Ed.), The New Grove Dictionary of Opera, Vol. One. p. 1221. London: MacMillan Publishers, Inc. 1998 ISBN 0-333-73432-7 ISBN 1-56159-228-5
- Pistone, Danièle (Trans. E. T. Glasgow) (1995), Nineteenth Century Italian Opera from Rossini to Puccini, Portland, OR: Amadeus Press. ISBN 0-931340-82-9
- Warrack, John and West, Ewan (1992), The Oxford Dictionary of Opera New York: OUP. ISBN 0-19-869164-5
- Zedda, Alberto. "La donna del lago" (trans. Susannah Howe). Naxos.

=== Performances ===
- "La donna del lago". La Scala. 2011. Archived from the original on 2 April 2015.
- "La donna del lago". Metropolitan Opera. 2015. Archived from the original on 15 March 2015.

=== Recordings ===
- Commons, Jeremy (2007), "La donna del lago" in booklet accompanying the Opera Rara recording
- Gossett, Philip (1983), "La Donna del Lago and the revival of the Rossini 'opera seria' " in the booklet accompanying the 1983 Pollini recording.
- Kaufman, Tom (2007), "Historical Performances of La donna del lago" in booklet accompanying the Opera Rara recording

=== Rossini ===
- Gallo, Denise (2010) [2002]. Gioachino Rossini: A Research and Information Guide (2 ed.). Abingdon: Routledge. ISBN 9781135847012.
- Osborne, Richard (1990), Rossini, (Master Musicians Series). Ithaca, New York: Northeastern University Press. ISBN 1-55553-088-5 ISBN 1-55553-088-5
- Osborne, Richard (2007), Rossini: His Life and Works Oxford University Press. ISBN 978-0-19-518129-6
- Toye, Francis (1987). Rossini, the man and his music (Revised edition of Rossini: A Study in Tragi-Comedy, Heinemann, London 1934. ed.). New York: Dover Publications. ISBN 9780486253961.
- Weinstock, Herbert (1968). Rossini: A Biography. New York: Knopf. OCLC 192614, 250474431. Reprint (1987): New York: Limelight. ISBN 978-0-87910-071-1.
