= Giovanni David =

Italian opera singer 1790-1864

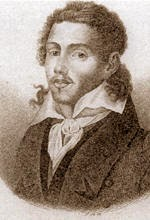
Tenor Giovanni David

Giovanni David (15 September 1790 in Naples – 1864 in Saint Petersburg) was an Italian tenor particularly known for his roles in Rossini operas.

== Overview ==
David (also known as Davide) was the son of the tenor Giacomo David, with whom he studied. He made his operatic début in Siena in 1808 in Adelaide de Guesclino by Johann Simon Mayr. He is notable for the principal roles written for him by Gioachino Rossini, mostly for Domenico Barbaia's theatres in Naples:

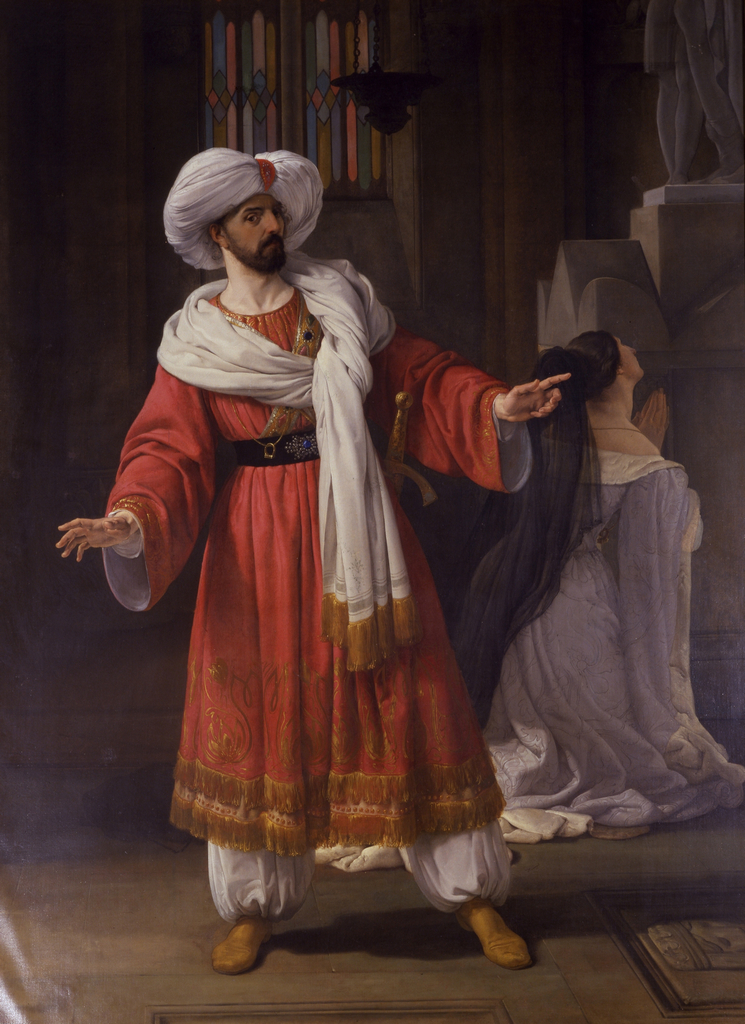
Giovanni David as Agobar in Pacini's Gli arabi nelle Gallie

- Narciso in Il turco in Italia (1814)
- Rodrigo in Otello (1816)
- Ricciardo in Ricciardo e Zoraide (1818)
- Oreste in Ermione (1819)
- Uberto (James IV of Scotland) in La donna del lago (1819)
- Ilo in Zelmira (1822)

He also created the roles of Fernando in the revised version of Bellini's Bianca e Fernando (1828) and Leicester in Donizetti's Il castello di Kenilworth (1829).

David was noted for his vocal range of almost 3 octaves in performance (up to b♭′&prime). However, according to Italian sources, David was certainly able to reach up only to F_{5} (and possibly to G_{5} or even to A_{5}), but not higher. He was also famous for his ability to sing extremely florid music, although compared with his contemporary, Andrea Nozzari, his acting ability was limited.

He retired from the stage in 1839, and subsequently managed an opera company in Saint Petersburg, Russia.
