= Sonia Ganassi =

Italian mezzo-soprano (born 1966)

Sonia Ganassi (born 1966) is an Italian mezzo-soprano. Born in Reggio Emilia, she made her debut as Rosina in Rossini’s The Barber of Seville in Rome in 1992. She has performed in many of the world’s famous opera houses including the Metropolitan Opera in New York City, the Royal Opera House in London and the Teatro alla Scala, Milan. She is best known for her work in the bel canto repertoire. Her roles in Rossini operas also include soprano parts, such as Elisabetta in Elisabetta, regina d'Inghilterra (ROF, 2004), Elena in La donna del lago (Lady of the Lake) (Rossini in Wildbad, 2006), Ermione (ROF, 2008), and Elcia in Mosè in Egitto (ROF, 2011). In 2009 she participated in a live recording of Giuseppe Verdi's Messa da Requiem conducted by Antonio Pappano (EMI Classics 6 98936 2). In October 2019 she debuted the leading role of Lady Macbeth in Verdi's Macbeth at the Teatro Lirico di Cagliari.

== Repertory ==
Her roles included:

Operatic role
Role	Opera	Composer
Romeo Montecchi	I Capuleti e i Montecchi	Bellini
Teresa	La sonnambula	Bellini
Adalgisa	Norma	Bellini
Marguerite	La damnation de Faust	Berlioz
Carmen	Carmen	Bizet
Giovanna Seymour	Anna Bolena	Donizetti
Maffio Orsini	Lucrezia Borgia	Donizetti
Elisabetta I	Maria Stuarda	Donizetti
Sara	Roberto Devereux	Donizetti
Leonora	La Favorita	Donizetti
Pierrotto	Linda di Chamounix	Donizetti
Zayda	Dom Sébastien	Donizetti
Rodelinda	Rodelinda	Händel
Helene	Hin und zurück	Hindemith
Zanetto	Zanetto	Mascagni
Charlotte	Werther	Massenet
Idamante	Idomeneo, Re di Creta	Mozart
Cherubino	Le nozze di Figaro	Mozart
Donna Elvira	Don Giovanni	Mozart
Dorabella	Così fan tutte	Mozart
Nicklausse	Les contes d'Hoffmann	Offenbach
Concepción	L'Heure espagnole	Ravel
Siveno	Demetrio e Polibio	Rossini
Isabella	L'Italiana in Algeri	Rossini
Sigismondo	Sigismondo	Rossini
Elisabetta	Elisabetta, regina d'Inghilterra	Rossini
Rosina	Il barbiere di Siviglia	Rossini
Angelina	La Cenerentola	Rossini
Elcìa	Mosè in Egitto	Rossini
Ermione	Ermione	Rossini
Elena	La donna del lago	Rossini
Emma	Zelmira	Rossini
Sinaïde	Moïse et Pharaon	Rossini
Jocasta	Oedipus rex	Stravinsky
Cuniza	Oberto, Conte di San Bonifacio	Verdi
Lady Macbeth	Macbeth	Verdi
Fenena	Nabucco	Verdi
Principessa d'Eboli	Don Carlo	Verdi
Amneris	Aida	Verdi
