= William Matteuzzi =

Italian opera singer

William Matteuzzi (born 12 December 1957 in Bologna, Italy) is an Italian operatic tenor renowned for his impressive vocal range and prominent upper register, reaching a high F (above the tenor high C) in full voice, which enabled him to participate in the recent revival of the tenore contraltino repertoire. he is nicknamed "the King of the high F". He is also admired as a fine musician and elegant vocalist.

He won the Enrico Caruso Singing Competition in 1980, which led him to Teatro alla Scala.

He has sung a wide repertoire ranging from Claudio Monteverdi or Antonio Vivaldi (Orlando furioso) to Wolfgang Amadeus Mozart (Così fan tutte), Vincenzo Bellini (I Puritani and La Sonnambula), Gaetano Donizetti (La fille du régiment) and Giovanni Pacini (L’ultimo giorno di Pompei).

A highly respected Rossini specialist, he made his Metropolitan Opera debut in 1988 as Count Almaviva in Il barbiere di Siviglia. He has performed Rossini's comic operas La scala di seta, L'occasione fa il ladro, L'italiana in Algeri, La gazza ladra, La Cenerentola, La pietra del paragone, Il viaggio a Reims, Le comte Ory as well as his opere serie Otello, Zelmira, Armida, Ricciardo e Zoraide, Maometto II, Semiramide, etc.

He now mainly dedicates himself to teaching singing and giving master classes in Italy, Germany and Japan, but he has latterly founded an ensemble for recording Monteverdi operas, which has released recordings of L'incoronazione di Poppea and L'Orfeo.
