= Maxim Mironov =

Russian opera singer (born 1981)

- Максим Миронов
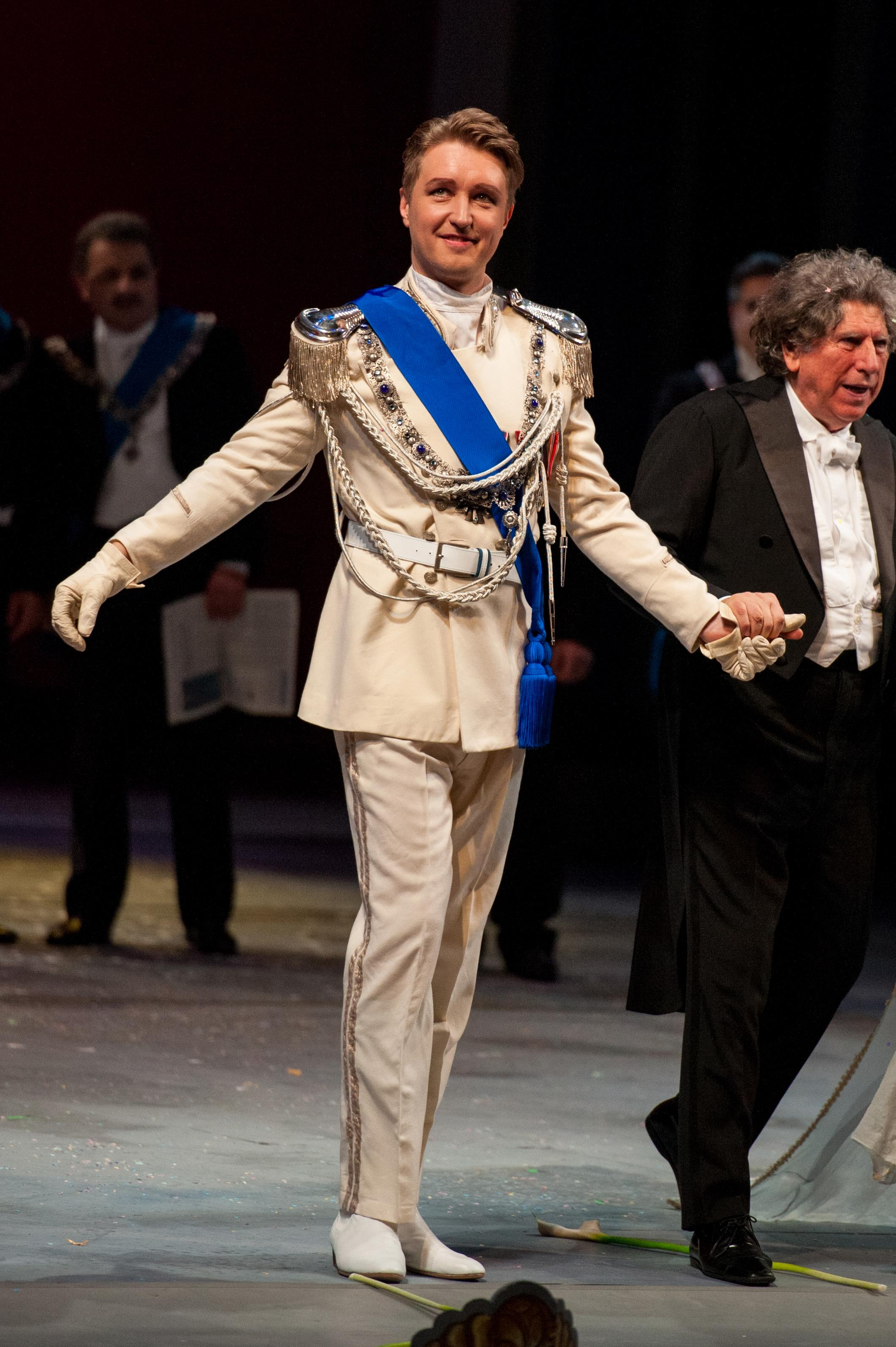
- Mironov as Prince Ramiro in La Cenerentola, Teatro di San Carlo (2015)
- Born: 30 September 1981 (age 43); Tula, Soviet Union
- Occupation: Opera singer (tenor)
- Years active: 2002–present
- Website: www.maximmironov.com

External videos
- "Cessa di più resistere", Count Almaviva's aria from The Barber of Seville by Gioachino Rossini on YouTube

Maxim Vyacheslavovich Mironov (Russian: Макси́м Вячесла́вович Миро́нов; born 30 September 1981 in Tula) is a Russian tenor, best known for his interpretation of the bel canto repertoire. In 2001, he joined the Helikon Opera Theatre in Moscow, where he made his operatic debut in André Grétry's opera Pierre le Grand. Mironov won the 2nd Prize at the Neue Stimmen international singing competition in Germany in 2003. In Europe Mironov has performed in many opera houses.

He has sung at a number of summer festivals, including Glyndebourne Festival Opera, Rossini Opera Festival in Pesaro, Rossini in Wildbad Festival, the Festival of Stresa and the Aix-en-Provence Festival.

Mironov made his U.S. debut in 2011 with the Los Angeles Opera, California. Since then he has performed at the Washington National Opera.

== Discography ==
Maxim Mironov has numerous recordings on CD and DVD for Dynamic, Bongiovanni, Bel Air Classic, Naxos Records and Opus Arte.

- La Cenerentola, Rossini, (2011, DVD) as Don Ramiro

with José Maria Lo Monaco, Maxim Mironov, Paolo Bordogna, Roberto de Candia Nicola Ulivieri, director Evelino Pidò; Dynamic

- La Donna del lago, Rossini (2008, CD) as Uberto/Giacomo V

with Sonia Ganassi, Maxim Mironov, Marianna Pizzolato, Ferdinand von Bothmer, Olga Peretyatko, Wojciech Adalbert Gierlach, Stefan Cifolelli; director Alberto Zedda; Naxos

- L'Italiana in Algeri, Rossini (2006, DVD and CD) as Lindoro

with Christianne Stotijn, Maxim Mironov, Marco Vinco, Giorgio Caoduro, director Riccardo Frizza; BelAir Classiques

- La Cenerentola, Rossini, (Glyndebourne, 2005 DVD) as Don Ramiro

with Raquela Sheeran, Lucia Cirillo, Ruxandra Donose, Nathan Berg, conductor Vladimir Jurowski, director Peter Hall; Opus Arte

- Maometto II, Rossini (2005, DVD) as Erisso

with Lorenzo Regazzo, Carmen Giannattasio, Maxim Mironov, Annarita Gemmabella; La Fenice Theatre Orchestra, director Claudio Scimone; Dynamic

- Pierre le Grand, Gretry (2003, DVD) Title role

Maxim Mironov, Elena Voznessenskaya, Nikolai Galin, Chorus and Orchestra of Helikon Opera; director Sergey Stadler; Arthaus

- Opera and Ballet Highlights, "The Blu-Ray Experience" (DVD) Opus Arte

== Selected repertoire ==
- Count Almaviva in Il barbiere di Siviglia (Gioachino Rossini)
- Prince Ramiro in La Cenerentola (Rossini)
- Lindoro in L'italiana in Algeri (Rossini)
- Count Libenskoff in Il viaggio a Reims (Rossini)
- Narciso in Il turco in Italia (Rossini)
- Comte Ory in Le comte Ory (Rossini)
- Rodrigo in Otello (Rossini)
- Ricciardo in Ricciardo e Zoraide (Rossini)
- Dorvil in La scala di seta (Rossini)
- Alberto in La gazzetta (Rossini)
- Idreno in Semiramide (Rossini)
- Tenor in Stabat Mater (Rossini)
- Fenton in Falstaff (Giuseppe Verdi)
- Castor in Castor et Pollux (Jean-Philippe Rameau)
- Orphée in Orfeo ed Euridice (Christoph Willibald Gluck)
- Achille in Iphigénie en Aulide (Gluck)
- Chapelou in Le postillon de Lonjumeau (Adolphe Adam)
- Tebaldo in I Capuleti e i Montecchi (Vincenzo Bellini)
- Arturo in I puritani (Bellini)
- Elvino in La sonnambula (Bellini)
- Nemorino in L'elisir d'amore (Gaetano Donizetti)
- Edgardo in Lucia di Lammermoor (Donizetti)
- Leicester in Maria Stuarda (Donizetti)
- Ernesto in Don Pasquale (Donizetti)
- Tonio in La fille du régiment (Donizetti)
- Roberto Devereux in Roberto Devereux (Donizetti)
- Don Ottavio in Don Giovanni (Wolfgang Amadeus Mozart)
- Ferrando in Così fan tutte (Mozart)
- Belmonte in Die Entführung aus dem Serail (Mozart)
- Marzio in Mitridate, re di Ponto (Mozart)
