= Camden Festival =

Annual spring festival in London, England

Camden Festival was an annual spring festival founded in 1954 and held in London, England. Originally, it was named the St Pancras Festival until 1965. It continued until 1987.

The festival specialised in the revival of long-forgotten operas, some of which subsequently made their way back into the repertory. Performances were given at St Pancras Town Hall until 1969, and thereafter at the Bloomsbury Theatre (formerly Collegiate Theatre).

Among now well-known singers who appeared in the Festival was the young Kiri Te Kanawa who sang Elena in Rossini's La donna del lago in 1969 prior to joining the Covent Garden Opera in 1970.

The Camden Festival was superseded by the Bloomsbury Festival in 1988. Today, the festival consists of a very broad range of cultural events, as evidenced by its 2013 programme, and opera appears as only a very small part of its programming.
