= Ricciardo e Zoraide =

Opera by Gioachino Rossini

- Opera by Gioachino Rossini
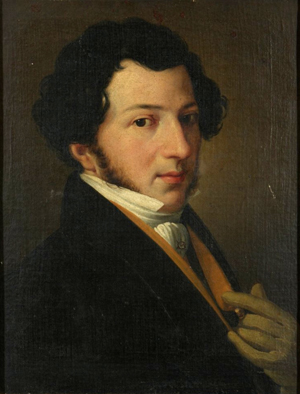
- Rossini c. 1815
- Librettist: Francesco Berio di Salsa
- Language: Italian
- Based on: Il Ricciardetto, epic poem by Forteguerri
- Premiere: 3 December 1818; Teatro San Carlo, Naples

Ricciardo e Zoraide (Ricciardo and Zoraide) is an opera in two acts by Gioachino Rossini to an Italian libretto by Francesco Berio di Salsa. The text is based on cantos XIV and XV of Il Ricciardetto, an epic poem by Niccolò Forteguerri.

== Performance history ==
Ricciardo e Zoraide was first performed at the Teatro San Carlo, Naples, on 3 December 1818. It continued to be performed until 1846 but fell out of favor afterwards and was not performed in public again until its revival at the Pesaro Rossini Opera Festival in 1990. The Rossini Opera Festival featured a new production of the opera in 2018. Among other performances, the opera received a production at the Rossini in Wildbad festival in 2013.

== Roles ==
Role	Voice type	Premiere Cast, 3 December 1818 (Conductor: Nicola Festa )
Agorante, King of Nubia, infatuated with Zoraide	tenor	Andrea Nozzari
Zomira, wife of Agorante	contralto	Benedetta Rosmunda Pisaroni
Zamorre, confidant of Agorante	tenor	Gaetano Chizzola
Elmira, confidant of Zomira	mezzo-soprano	Raffaella de Bernardis
Ircano, a Middle Eastern prince	bass	Michele Benedetti
Zoraide, daughter of Ircano, in love with Ricciardo	soprano	Isabella Colbran
Ricciardo, a Christian paladin knight, in love with Zoraide	tenor	Giovanni David
Fatima, confidant of Zoraide	mezzo-soprano	Maria Manzi
Ernesto, friend of Ricciardo, Christian camp ambassador,	tenor	Giuseppe Ciccimarra

== Synopsis ==
Place: the city of Dongola in ancient Nubia.
Time: The time of the Crusades

The Nubian King Agorante, who is infatuated with Zoraide, has defeated her father, Ircano and captured her. Ricciardo, a Christian knight and Zoraide's lover, accompanies an emissary to plead for her release. Agorante's jealous wife, Zomira, arranges the capture of Ricciardo as well and plots to have the young lovers executed to protect her position as Queen. The opera ends with an army of Christian knights rescuing Ricciardo and Zoraide. Ricciardo spares Agorante's life.

== Recordings ==
Year	Cast: Agorante, Zoraide, Ricciardo, Zomira, Ircano	Conductor, Opera House and Orchestra	Label:
1990	Bruce Ford, June Anderson, William Matteuzzi, Gloria Scalchi, Giovanni Furlanetto	Riccardo Chailly, Orchestra del Teatro Comunale di Bologna, Prague Philharmonic Chorus	VHS Video: Bel Canto Society; Cat: #619
1995	Bruce Ford, Nelly Miricioiu, William Matteuzzi, Della Jones, Alastair Miles	David Parry, Orchestra of the Academy of St Martin in the Fields and the Geoffrey Mitchell Choir	Audio CD: Opera Rara; Cat: ORC 14
2018	Randall Bills, Alessandra Marianelli, Maxim Mironov, Silvia Beltrami, Nahuel di Pierro	José Miguel Pérez-Sierra, Virtuosi Brunensis and the Camerata Bach Choir of Poznań	Audio CD: Naxos Records; Cat:8 660419-21|
2019	Sergey Romanovsky, Pretty Yende, Juan Diego Flórez, Victoria Yarovaya, Nicola Ulivieri	Giacomo Sagripanti, Orchestra Sinfonica Nazionale della RAI, Marshall Pynkoski, stage director	DVD:C Major; Cat: 752704
