= John Osborn (tenor) =

American operatic tenor (born 1972)

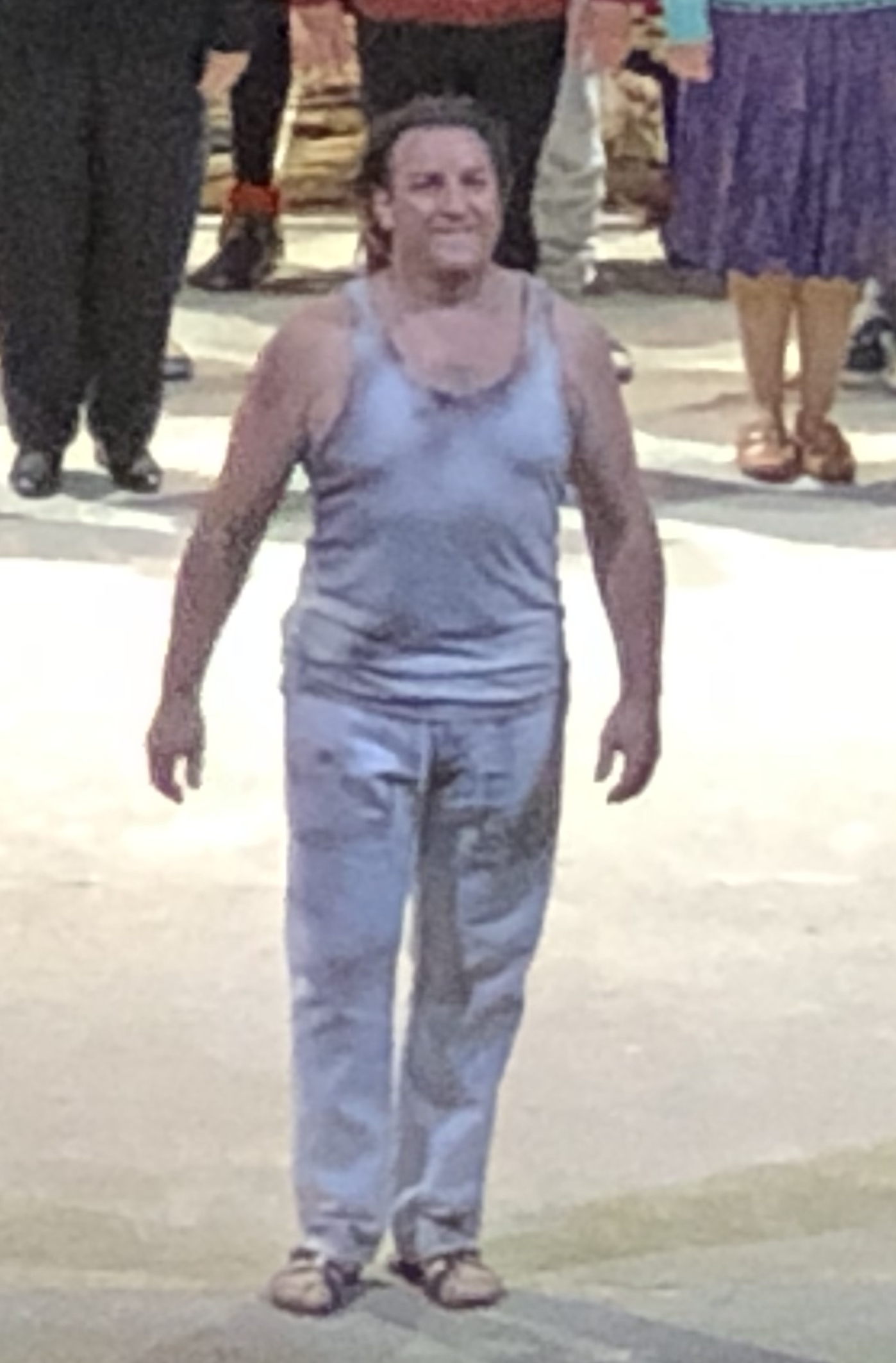
- Osborn in 2019, in Les Pêcheurs de perles in Barcelona
- Born: May 16, 1972 (age 54); Sioux City, Iowa
- Education: Simpson College
- Occupation: Operatic tenor
- Organizations: Leipzig Opera; Oper Frankfurt
- Awards: Metropolitan Opera National Council Auditions
- Website: www.johnosborntenor.com

John Osborn (born May 16, 1972) is an American operatic tenor. He is particularly associated with the bel canto repertoire, especially the works of Rossini, Donizetti and roles in French Grand Opera.

== Life and career ==
Osborn was born in Sioux City, Iowa, and studied music at Simpson College. He made his professional debut in The Saint of Bleecker Street at the Des Moines Metro Opera in 1993.

Osborn was a winner of the Metropolitan Opera National Council Auditions in 1994 at the age of 21. He made his Met debut in Salome in 1996, and has subsequently sung the roles of Don Ottavio in Mozart's Don Giovanni and Count Almaviva in Rossini's The Barber of Seville, Goffredo in Rossini's Armida, Rodrigo di Dhu in Donizetti's La donna del lago, and Arnold in Rossini's Guillaume Tell with the company.

Osborn is an alumnus of the Music Academy of the West summer conservatory program, where he attended in 1997.

In 2007, he had made his role debut as Arnold with Antonio Pappano conducting the Orchestra and Chorus of the Accademia Nazionale di Santa Cecilia, a role he has since repeated at the Royal Opera House in London, Theater an der Wien, Grand Théâtre de Genève, Dutch National Opera, Opéra de Lyon, Wiener Staatsoper, Teatro Regio di Torino and his debut at Carnegie Hall with Gianandrea Noseda. In 2011 he appeared in the demanding lead role of Raoul in Meyerbeer's Les Huguenots at La Monnaie in Brussels. He has recently reprised the role at the Semperoper and in Geneva. Osborn has sung the title of role of Rossini's Otello at the Opéra de Lausanne, Teatro San Carlo in Naples, and also in Tokyo, Vienna, Paris, Lyon, Zurich and at the Salzburg Festspielhaus, among other venues.

Further lead roles in French opera repertoire include Roméo in Gounod's Roméo et Juliette at the Salzburg Festival and the Arena di Verona Festival, Hoffmann in Offenbach's Les contes d'Hoffmann in Lyon, Amsterdam, Teatro Reina Sofia Belles Arts in Valencia, and in Naples; Des Grieux in Massenet's Manon at the Opéra de Lausanne, Teatro Colon in Buenos Aires, and the title role of Benvenuto Cellini in Amsterdam and the Liceu in Barcelona and at Opera di Roma; Prince Léopold in Halevy's La Juive at the Opéra Bastille, in Zürich, Amsterdam and at the Munich Opera Festival; the title role of Massenet's Werther with Oper Frankfurt; and the title role in Auber's Fra Diavolo in Rome.

In 2017 the tenor won widespread acclaim for his performances in the leading role of Jean de Leyde in Meyerbeer's Le prophète in two different productions, one at the Théâtre du Capitole de Toulouse and the other at the Aalto-Musiktheater Essen.

Osborn is the recipient of the 2011 Goffredo Petrassi Award for his contributions to Italian culture, 2012 Aureliano Pertile Award in Asti, Italy for his portrayal as Roméo at the Arena di Verona; 2014 Premio Bellini D’Oro in Catania, Sicily for his Elvino in Bellini's La sonnambula in Bari's Teatro Petruzzelli and Alfredo Germont in Verdi's La traviata at the Arena di Verona; 2016 "Prix d’Amis" from the Friends of the Dutch National Opera for his performances as Cellini in Benvenuto Cellini; the Italian “Franco Abbiati” Critics Award for best Male Singer for his critically acclaimed performances as Fernand in Donizetti's La favorite at La Fenice, Cellini in Benvenuto Cellini at Teatro dell’opera di Roma, and his Otello at the Teatro San Carlo di Napoli in the season 2016; and most recently the Italian "Oscar della Lirica" from Fondazione Arena di Verona in the category of "Best Tenor" 2016/17 (Awards Ceremony held in Haiku, Hainan, China).

Audio recordings include Tribute to Gilbert Duprez with Constantine Oberlian and the Kaunas Symphony Orchestra on Delos Records, L'amour consacré and La coppia degli acuti with wife and soprano, Lynette Tapia, Christopher Larkin conducting the English Chamber Orchestra; Guillaume Tell (the complete French version) with Antonio Pappano and the Accademia Nazionale di Santa Cecilia; and Bellini's Norma for Decca with Cecilia Bartoli, Sumi Jo, and Michele Pertusi, and Rossini's Semiramide from the Rossini Festival Bad Wildbad on Naxos, and Meyerbeer's Robert le diable.

Video recordings include the Halevy's Clari (DVD: Decca); Rossini's Armida (The Met Live in HD: Decca); and Bellini's I puritani (DVD: Opus Arte), Benvenuto Cellini staged by Terry Gilliam (TV), and also Les contes d'Hoffmann with Dutch National Opera, staged by Tobias Kratzer; and also one by Laurent Pelly (Opéra de Lyon Japan Tour's televised by NHK).
