= Giuseppe Ciccimarra =

Italian opera singer (1790–1836)

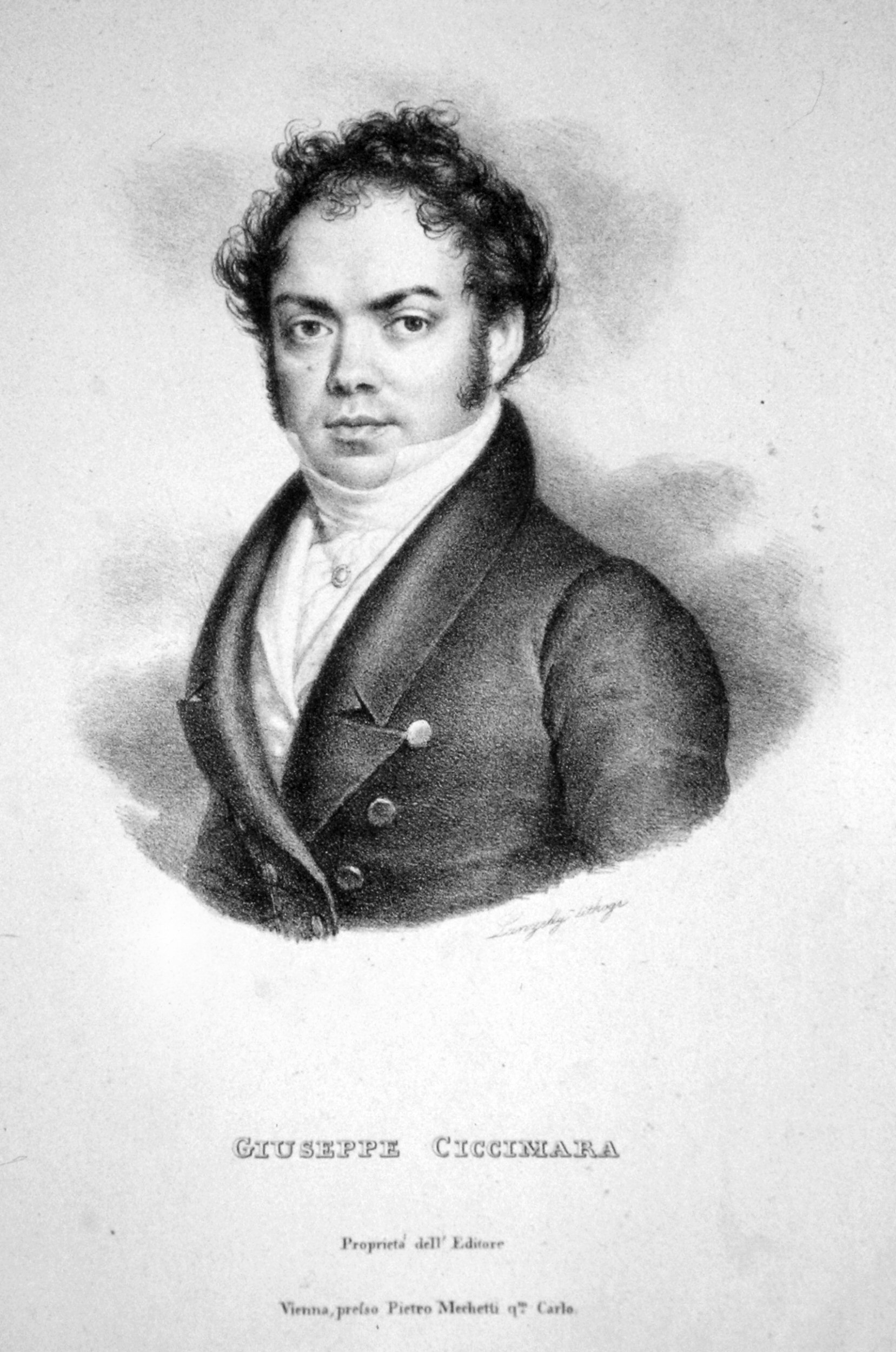
- Ciccimara c.1820; lithograph by Joseph Lanzedelly the Elder
- Born: 22 May 1790; Altamura
- Died: 5 December 1836 (aged 46); Venice
- Occupation: Italian Tenor

Giuseppe Ciccimarra (22 May 1790 – 5 December 1836) was an Italian tenor, closely associated with Rossini roles.

== Career ==
Ciccimarra was born in Altamura. He was considered one of the best comprimario tenors of his time.

For Rossini, he created, at the Teatro San Carlo in Naples, several roles including: Iago in Otello, Goffredo in Armida, Aronne in Mosè in Egitto, Ernesto in Ricciardo e Zoraide, Pilade in Ermione, Condulmiero in Maometto II.

Ciccimarra retired from the stage in 1826, and taught voice and piano in Vienna. Among his pupils were Josef Tichatschek, creator of Wagner's Rienzi and Tannhäuser, the Austrian tenor Heinrich Kreutzer, Adele Muzzarelli, soprano, soubrette and dancer and Sophie Löwe, one of the most famous opera singers of her time. He died in Venice.

== Sources ==
- Roland Mancini and Jean-Jacques Rouveroux (orig. H. Rosenthal and J. Warrack, French edition), Guide de l’opéra, Les indispensables de la musique (Fayard, 1995). ISBN 2-213-59567-4
