= Benedetta Rosmunda Pisaroni =

Italian opera singer

Portrait of Benedetta Rosmunda Pisaroni by Giovanni Antonio Sasso

Benedetta Rosmunda Pisaroni (16 May 1793 in Piacenza – 6 August 1872 in Piacenza) was an Italian soprano who later became a contralto.

She was born as Benedetta Pisaroni to Giambattista Pisaroni and Luigia Pratti. Active on the operatic stage from 1811 to 1831, she suffered from smallpox in the early years of her career, which caused a change (downward) in her extended vocal range.

Appearing in Bergamo, Padua, Bologna, Venice, Milan, Rome, and eventually Paris in the 1810s and 1820s, she was closely associated with the operas of Gioachino Rossini and Giacomo Meyerbeer.

== Roles created ==
- Romilda in Meyerbeer's Romilda e Costanza (1817)
- Zomira in Rossini's Ricciardo e Zoraide (1818)
- Andromaca in Rossini's Ermione (1819)
- Malcolm in Rossini's La donna del lago (1819)
- Almanzor in Meyerbeer's L'esule di Granata (1821)

== Sources ==
- Forbes, Elizabeth (1992), 'Pisaroni, Benedetta Rosmunda' in The New Grove Dictionary of Opera, ed. Stanley Sadie (London) ISBN 0-333-73432-7
