= Michele Benedetti (bass) =

Italian opera singer

Michele Benedetti (17 October 1778 – after 1828 ) was an Italian bass particularly associated with Rossini roles.

== Career ==
Benedetti was born in Loreto. He sang in the world première of Giuseppe Farinelli's Calliroe in 1808 and at the Italian première of Spontini's La vestale in 1811, both in Naples, where his career was based.

He created several Rossini roles in Naples, notably: Elmiro in Otello, Idraote in Armida, the title role in Mosè in Egitto, Ircano in Ricciardo e Zoraide, Fenicio in Ermione, Douglas in La donna del lago, Leucippo in Zelmira.

For Donizetti, he created the roles of Atkins in Alfredo il grande (1823) and the King in Gianni di Calais (1828), and for Bellini in 1826 the role of Clemente in Bianca e Gernando.

He also sang in Paris and London, and appeared in premières of operas by Mayr, Pacini, and Mercadante.

Stendhal wrote an enthusiastic critique of his interpretation of Mosè.
