= Carmen Giannattasio =

Italian operatic soprano (born 1975)

- Born: 24 April 1975 (age 51)
- Origin: Italy
- Genres: Opera
- Instrument: Voice
- Years active: 1999–

Carmen Giannattasio (born 24 April 1975 in Avellino) is an Italian operatic soprano. She studied at the Conservatoire Domenico Cimarosa of Avellino and simultaneously at the University of Salerno (degree in Russian and English Literatures). From 1999 to 2001 she attended the school for young opera singers (L’Accademia di Perfezionamento) at La Scala, Milan. In 2002 she won first and audience prize at Operalia competition in Paris.

== Biography ==
Giannattasio has worked with many renowned international conductors including Maurizio Benini, Semyon Bychkov, Roland Böer, Sir Colin Davis, Plácido Domingo, Dan Ettingerá, Asher Fisch, Riccardo Frizza, Daniele Gatti, Michel Plasson, René Jacobs, Riccardo Muti, Daniel Oren, Zubin Mehta, Myung-whun Chung, Antonio Pappano, Michele Mariotti, and David Parry.

In 2012, she made her Royal Opera House, Covent Garden debut as Mimi in John Copley's production of La boheme and her Metropolitan Opera, New York, debut as Leonora in David McVicar's production of Il trovatore. In the same year she also had a debut at Arena di Verona in Zeffirelli's production of Mozart's Don Giovanni starring Ildebrando D'Arcangelo. In December 2012 she was acclaimed in Naples as Violetta in La Traviata under the direction of Turkish cinema director Ferzan Ozpetek.

== Discography ==
She has recorded many CDs with Opera Rara. These include Rossini's La donna del lago and Ermione (which won a 2011 The Gramophone Award); Donizetti's Parisina d'Este; and Bellini's Il pirata.

She performed the role of Alice in Meyerbeer's "Robert le Diable" in a concert performance in Selerno, recorded by Brilliant Classics in 2012.

She has also recorded Verdi Messa da Requiem; Domenico Cimarosa's "Il marito disperato"; and Donizetti's "Ugo, conte di Parigi" as well as his "Caterina Cornaro".

2005's Gran Teatro La Fenice performance Rossini's "Maometto Secondo" released as DVD from Dynamic.

2008's Teatro Comunale di Bologna performance Verdi's "Simon Boccanegra" released as Blu-ray from Arthaus Musik (2010).

2012's "La traviata" staged by Ferzan Özpetek at Teatro di San Carlo was released as PAL DVD from CG Entertainment (2015).
