= Pietro Antonio Giramo =

Italian Baroque composer

Pietro Antonio Giramo (fl.1619 in Naples – c. 1630) was an Italian baroque composer. His surviving works consist of two works in collections 1619, 1620, the Arie for several voices (Naples, 1630) and a reprint of two cantatas; Il pazzo con la pazza ristampata and Uno ospedale per gl’infermi d’amore (A Hospital for the Love-Sick) (after 1630).

== Recordings ==
- Thomas Hengelbrock
