= Andrea Nozzari =

Italian tenor

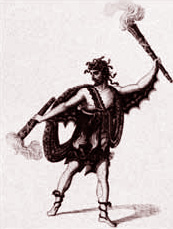
Andrea Nozzari as Poliflegonte in Simon Mayr's Il sogno di Partenope

Andrea Nozzari (27 February 1776 – 12 December 1832) was an Italian tenor.

Nozzari was born in Vertova and studied in Bergamo and Rome. He is notable for the principal roles written for him by Gioachino Rossini and mostly premiered in Domenico Barbaia's theatres in Naples. These were:

- Leicester in Elisabetta, regina d'Inghilterra (1815)
- Otello in Otello (1816)
- Rinaldo in Armida (1817)
- Osiride in Mosè in Egitto (1818)
- Agorante in Ricciardo e Zoraide (1818)
- Pirro in Ermione (1819)
- Rodrigo in La donna del lago (1819)
- Paolo Erisso in Maometto II (1820)
- Antenore in Zelmira (1822)

He also premièred the title roles in Giovanni Pacini's Alessandro nelle Indie (1824) and Donizetti's Alfredo il grande, and roles in operas by Michele Carafa, Manuel García, Johann Simon Mayr, Saverio Mercadante, Nicola Antonio Manfroce and Stefano Pavesi.

Nozzari's voice had a baritonal quality, and his intense acting was much valued by composers and the public. Stendhal thought him one of the finest singers in Europe. Among his pupils were Antonio Poggi, Giovanni Battista Rubini and Nicola Ivanoff.

He died in Naples.
