= Teatro Lirico di Cagliari =

Opera house in Cagliari, Italy

Coordinates: 39°13′33″N 9°07′24″E

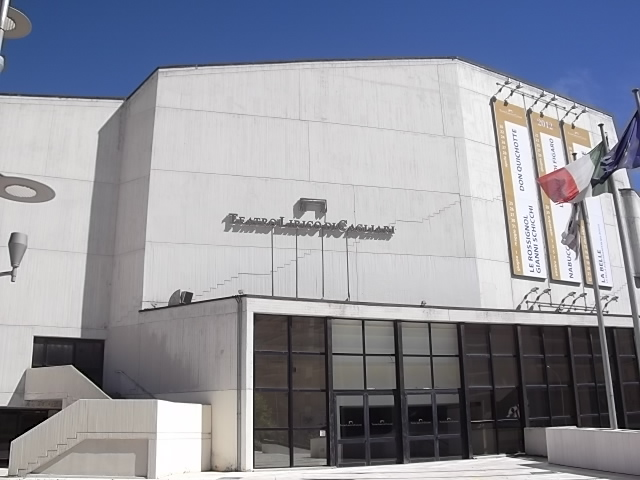
The theatre access at the stalls level.

The Teatro Lirico di Cagliari is an opera house in Cagliari. It is the main theatre of the city.

The Teatro Lirico was built in order to provide a large theatre to the city. After the destruction of the Teatro Civico, damaged by the shelling of Cagliari operated by the Allies during World War II, and the destruction of the Politeama Regina Margherita due to a fire in 1942, after the war there was not a suitable theatre in Cagliari.

The project, by the Italian architects Luciano Galmozzi, Pierfrancesco Ginoulhiac e Teresa Ginoulhiac Arslan, won a bid for the contract in 1967. The opera house was inaugurated in 1993. It covers a surface of 5,000 square metres (54,000 sq ft) among the stage (which is 22 to 23.40 metres (72.2 to 76.8 ft) wide; 12.5 to 25 metres (41 to 82 ft) long; and 23 metres (75 ft) high), the auditorium (with 1,628 seats divided into stalls, 800 seats, and two loggias, 431 and 397 seats) and the foyer. Various rooms, like laboratories, offices, bar, book shop and restaurant were added after the inauguration.

The Teatro Lirico di Cagliari has received some important national prizes, in particular the Premio Franco Abbiati in 2001 for its innovatory programme. The prize was also awarded to the Teatro Lirico di Cagliari in 2000 and 2005 for Lucia di Lammermoor and Carmen respectively. Conductor Carlos Kleiber gave his last concert here in February 1999.

== See also ==
- Cagliari
