= Chris Merritt =

American tenor (b. 1952)

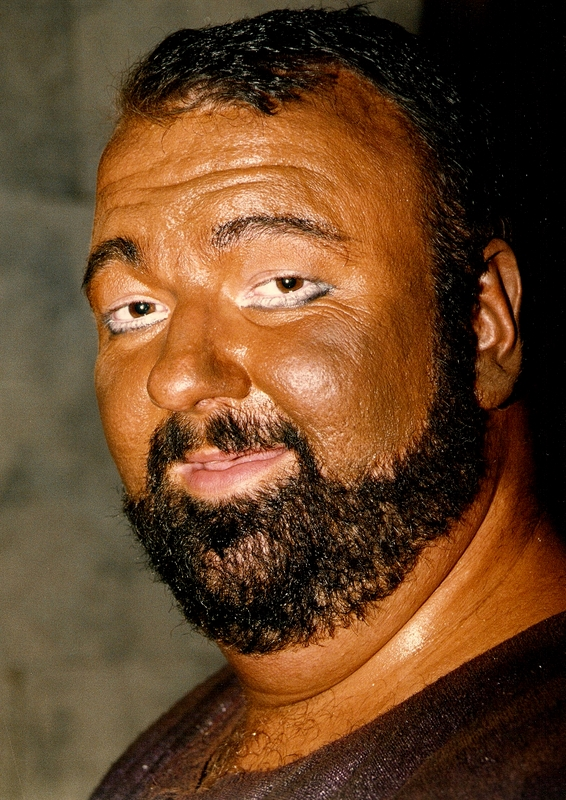
Merritt performing in 1986 as the titular character in a production of the opera Othello

Chris Merritt (born September 27, 1952, in Oklahoma City) is an American tenor.

== Education ==
Merritt began piano studies at 8 years of age with Viola Knight. During this time, he also studied art at the Oklahoma Museum of Art. At 9 years of age he began dance studies under Jewel Grigsby. He credits Al Ossenkopp, one of the music teachers at his Oklahoma City high school, with inspiring him to take up a singing career.

Finally, Merritt began singing lessons in the preparatory department of Oklahoma City University at 15 years of age. His teacher was Florence Gillam Birdwell. By this time, he had already changed piano studies to Oklahoma City University (OCU) preparatory department with Dr. Robert Laughlin. It was also at OCU where he made his first operatic appearance in Douglas Moore's The Ballad of Baby Doe, at the age of 17, in a university production and singing alongside university-school-mate Leona Mitchell. At 18 and 19 years of age he performed and studied at Inspiration Point Fine Arts Colony, Arkansas, under direction of Dr. Isaac van Grove. At age 20 he was accepted at the Wolf Trap Farm Park for the Performing Arts in Virginia as fellowship artist where he studied and coached with John Moriarti, Benton Hess and Rhoda Levine. At age 21 he was accepted into the summer season "Apprentice Program for Singers" at The Santa Fe Opera. During his college career at Oklahoma City University from 1970 to 1978, Merritt's voice teachers were Inez Lunsford Silberg and Florence Gillam Birdwell. Later, he also received an Honorary Doctorate of Music from that institution.

== Career ==
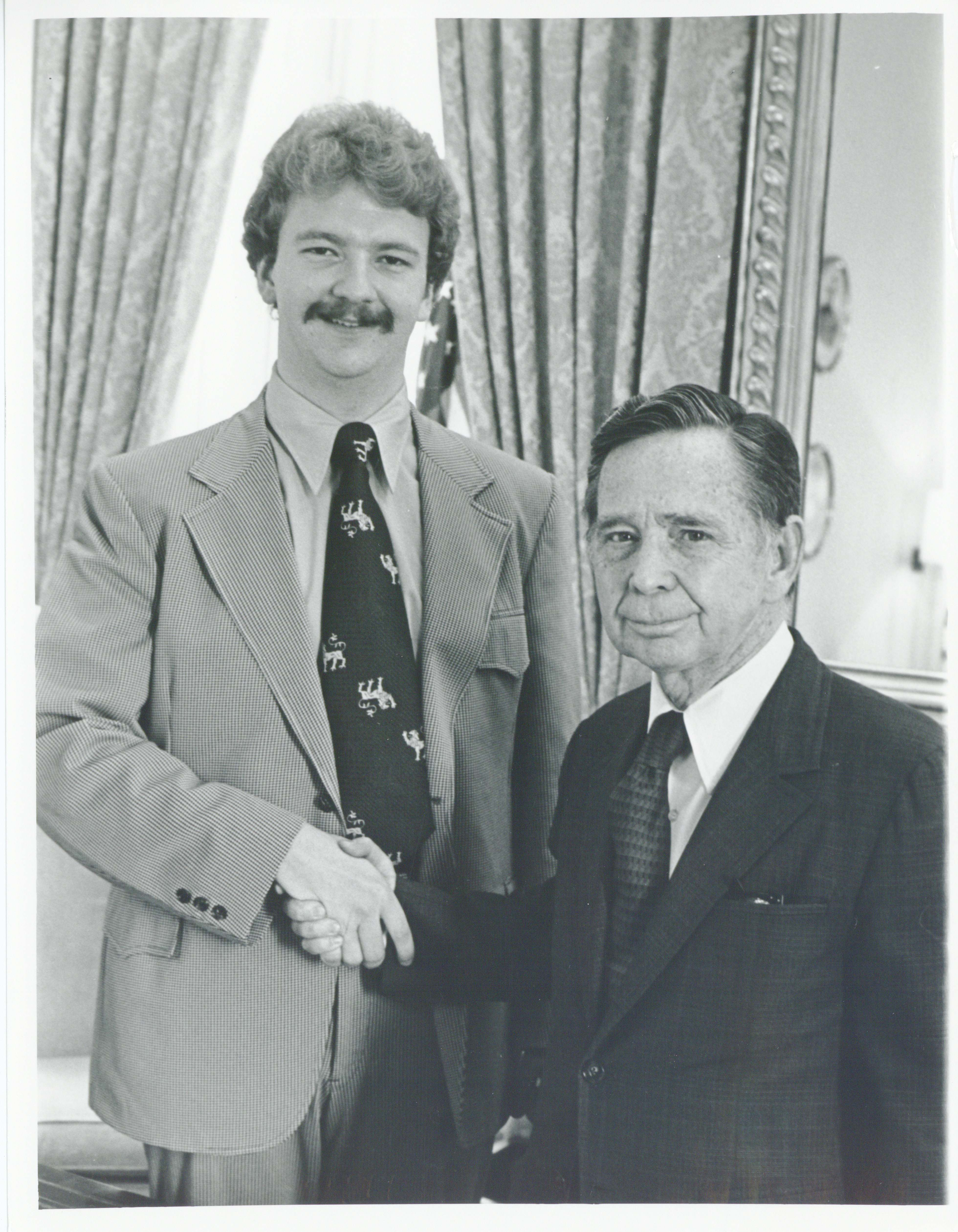
Merritt (left) meeting U.S. House Speaker Carl Albert

Merritt made his professional debut at The Santa Fe Opera in 1975, as Dr. Caius in Verdi's Falstaff, singing with Thomas Stewart in the title role in a production by Colin Graham and conducted by Edo de Waart. However, he also appeared in the Metropolitan Opera's National Council Regional Auditions National Finals Concert on March 28, 1976.

In 1977, Merritt attended the American Institute of Musical Studies (AIMS) in Graz, Austria as a scholarship recipient. After hearing him at a presentation-concert, an agent sent him out on an audition tour through Austria, Switzerland and Germany. Merritt returned to the AIMS program in 1978 where he made his European debut in a concert broadcast live from Graz' Schloss Eggenberg on ORF Austrian National Radio, singing Janáček's song-cycle The Diary of One who Vanished and collaborating with pianist Norman Shettler.

Merritt began a three-year engagement as ensemble member of the Landestheater Salzburg in the fall of 1978, while from 1981 to 1984 he sang as an ensemble member at the Staedtische Buehnen Augsburg in Germany.

From 1978 to 1984, Merritt performed as guest artist in Kiel, Karlsruhe and Linz, as well as two seasons performing with "Fest In Hellbrunn" in Salzburg. Here he was heard singing in such operas as Gluck's La Danza (also in a studio recording for ORF Austrian National Recording), Haydn's Philemon und Baucis, Telemann's Der Geduldige Sokrates, Offenbach's Les Deux Aveugle and Richard Strauss' Des Esels Schatten, in a world premier of the posthumously-completed full-orchestration, which was recorded and televised for Austrian National Television. The performances with Fest in Hellbrunn were all conducted by Ernst Maerzendorfer.

Performances of concert work during this period included Haydn's Die Schoepfung and Bach's St Matthew Passion (Evangelist and arias) in Denmark, Augsburg and with the Wiener Symphoniker in Vienna's Musikverein, Bruckner's Te Deum at Vienna's Konzerthaus, Beethoven's Ninth Symphony with the Hamburg Symphoniker, and Verdi's Messe da Requiem in Kiel. In Salzburg he was heard in Carl Orff's Carmina Burana, Mozart's Requiem, and Handel's Messiah. Additionally in Salzburg he was heard singing in Leopold Mozart's Lauretanische Litenei, Adlgasse's Te Deum and Michael Haydn's Requiem, all of which were recorded for the Schwann-Koch Label.

Also during this time in Salzburg, Merritt sang in concert performances of the world premiere of Franz Richter Herf's Odysseus, together with Barbara Bonney. This was also recorded.

Auditioning for Beverly Sills during her tour of Germany searching for US talent to bring back home won him the role of Arturo in I Puritani for his debut with the New York City Opera in 1981. That same year, Merritt met Marcel Prawy of the Vienna State Opera in Salzburg who arranged a house audition at the Viennese opera company. Merritt was offered the role of Leopold in Halevy's La Juive for his debut in concert performances alongside of José Carreras and Cesare Siepi. In 1983, Merritt made his debut at New York City's Carnegie Hall, singing Argirio in Rossini's Tancredi with Marilyn Horne and later in 1983, he made his Paris debut singing the role of Amenophis under Georges Prêtre at the Palais Garnier in Rossini's Moïse et Pharaon, the composer's Mose in Egitto rewritten in French. The production was directed by Luca Ronconi. Also that same year, Merritt made his UK debut in London with the London Philharmonic Orchestra singing Beethoven's Ninth Symphony at the Royal Festival Hall, conducted by Klaus Tennstedt.

Merritt had five important debuts in 1985: he was heard at London's Royal Opera House, Covent Garden as Giacomo/Uberto in Rossini's La donna del lago, then at the Hamburg State Opera as Idreno in Rossini's Semiramide. His Italian debut was at Pesaro's Rossini Opera Festival, singing the role of Paolo Erisso in the composer's Maometto II in a production by Pier Luigi Pizzi. Shortly after, he performed the role of Conte Libenskof in Rossini's Il viaggio a Reims in a production at Milan's La Scala directed by Luca Roconi and conducted by Claudio Abbado. Finally, Merritt made his debut at the Lyric Opera of Chicago as Percy in Donizetti's Anna Bolena, singing with Joan Sutherland in a production directed by Lotfi Mansouri with Richard Bonynge conducting.

His Metropolitan Opera debut took place on November 30, 1990, when he sang again with Marilyn Horne and Samuel Ramey the role of Idreno in Rossini's Semiramide. That same season he sang there in the role of Arturo in I puritani along with Edita Gruberova and Paul Plishka, conducted by Richard Bonynge. Other principal roles in which he was featured at the Met included those in Rusalka, with Renee Fleming and Dolora Zajick in 1997, and in Káťa Kabanová with Karita Mattila and Magdelena Kozena in 2005, his last appearance in that house.

Elsewhere, he sang again at Covent Garden as Idreno in Semiramide, Arnold in Guillaume Tell (in 1990 and in 1992), in Henze's Boulevard Solitude and in Katja Kabanova. At the San Francisco Opera he sang in Maometto II (debut in 1988), and also in the role of Arnold in Guillaume Tell in 1992 and 1997/98 season, in Rossini's Otello, in I vespri siciliani, and in St. Francis d'Assise and Doktor Faust. On August 6, 1993, he sang the title role in Sigurd at the sole performance of that rarely performed opera at the Festival Montpellier. In 1988 and in 1989 he appeared in the opening productions of La Scala's opera season, in Guillaume Tell and I Vespri Siciliani. Both were conducted by Riccardo Muti. He then returned as Rodrigo in La donna del lago, also conducted by Muti. At the Opéra de Paris, he returned to sing the title role of Benvenuto Cellini, appeared in two different seasons as Herod in Salome, as Le Lepreux in Olivier Messiaen's Saint François d'Assise, and as Eleazar in La Juive.

In 2006, Merritt appeared in the American premiere production of Thomas Adès' The Tempest, marking his return to The Santa Fe Opera.

== See also ==
- The Rossini Bicentennial Birthday Gala
