= Geoffrey Mitchell (conductor) =

- Born: 6 June 1936
- Died: 27 June 2026 (aged 90)
- Occupations: chorister; choral conductor; choir manager

Geoffrey Mitchell (1936–2026) was a British countertenor-voiced chorister, choral conductor choir manager and academic.

== Career ==
Mitchell was born on 6 June 1936 and joined Exeter Cathedral choir at the age of eight, eventually becoming head chorister. Ten years later, he joined the Renaissance Singers, while undertaking National Service in the Royal Navy.

Mitchell has performed with the Purcell Singers, Schütz Choir, Cantores in Ecclesia, Pro Cantione Antiqua and the John Alldis Choir and as a soloist. He was chorus manager of the BBC Singers for over 11 years.

He was a Professor of Counter-Tenor at the Royal Academy of Music and chairman and vice-president of the National Federation of Cathedral Old Choristers’ Associations. He was also chief guest conductor of Carillon, guest conductor of Brazil's Camerata Antiqua of Curitiba, and director of the London Festival Singers.

At live performances by Pink Floyd of their Atom Heart Mother suite, he conducted his own Geoffrey Mitchell Choir as well as the brass section. Filmed extracts from two of these 1971 performances are included in the Pink Floyd box set The Early Years 1965–1972. The choir has performed several times at the BBC Proms.

He conducted on early recordings of Jesus Christ Superstar and Evita for Andrew Lloyd Webber. He received a Grammy nomination in 1972 for "Best Pop Vocal Performance By A Duo, Group Or Chorus", for his work on the former's London production album.

His awards included an honorary Diploma from the Royal Academy, the licentiate of Trinity College of Music, and a Gramophone Classical Music Award in 2011.

Mitchell died on 27 June 2026, shortly after his 90th birthday. Exeter Cathedral Old Choristers' Association's obituary describes him as "one of the pioneers who brought about the revival of the counter-tenor voice in the mid-twentieth century."
