= Zelmira =

Opera by Gioachino Rossini

- Opera by Gioachino Rossini
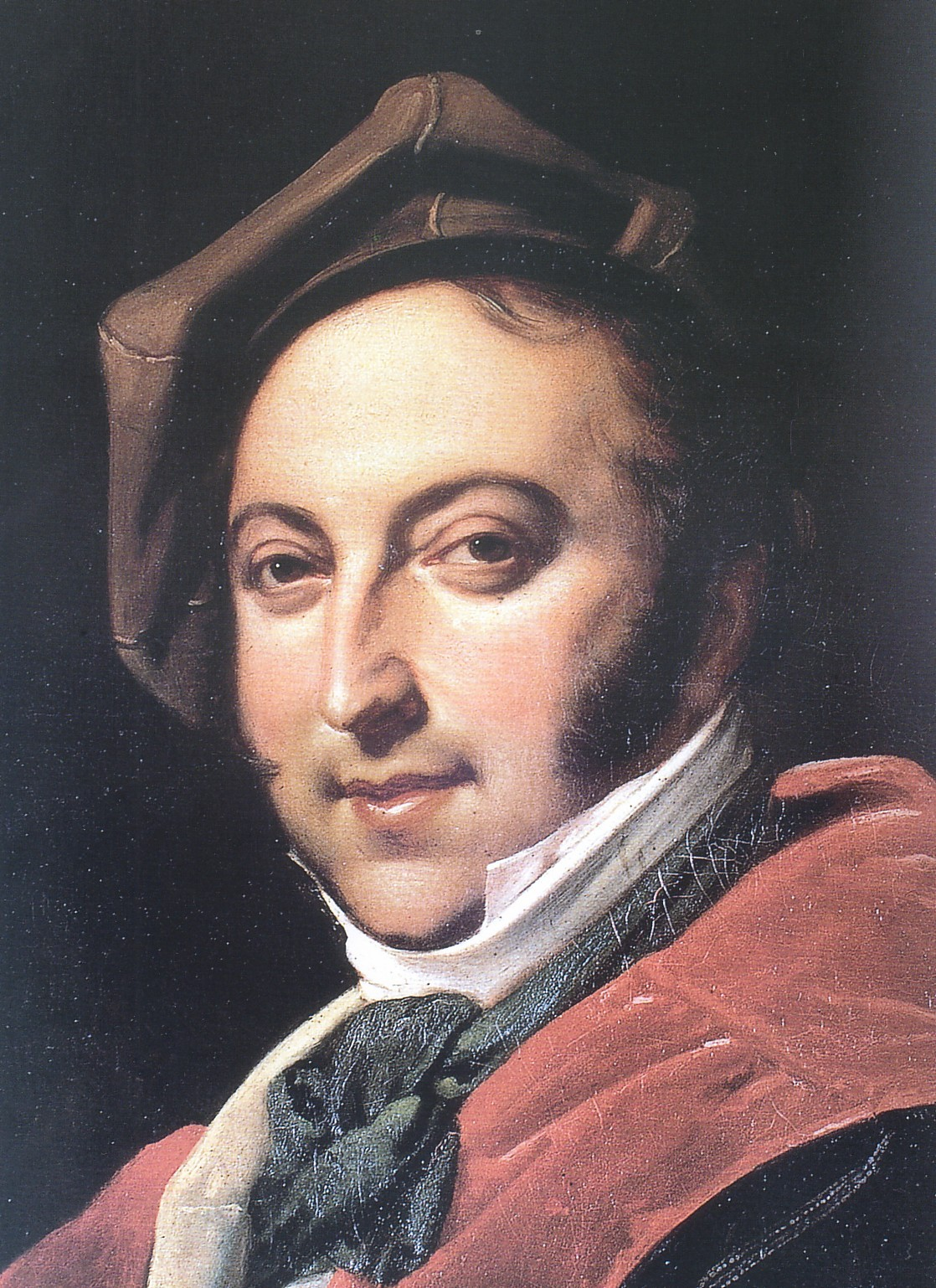
- Rossini c. 1820
- Librettist: Andrea Leone Tottola
- Language: Italian
- Based on: Zelmire by de Belloy
- Premiere: 16 February 1822; Teatro di San Carlo, Naples

Zelmira (Italian pronunciation: [dzelˈmiːra]) is an opera in two acts by Gioachino Rossini to a libretto by Andrea Leone Tottola. Based on the French play, Zelmire by de Belloy, it was the last of the composer's Neapolitan operas. Stendhal called its music Teutonic, comparing it with La clemenza di Tito but remarking: "...while Mozart would probably, had he lived, have grown completely Italian, Rossini may well, by the end of his career, have become more German than Beethoven himself!"

== Performance history ==
The first performance of Zelmira was in Naples at the Teatro di San Carlo on 16 February 1822. This was followed by a successful premiere in Vienna on 13 April 1822, as part of a three-month-long Rossini Festival for which Rossini wrote some additional music. Performances in several Italian cities were followed by the London premiere on 24 January 1824, with Rossini conducting and Isabella Colbran (now his wife) in the title role. It was seen in Paris in 1826. There was one presentation in the US in New Orleans "around" 1835.

Over 100 years were to pass before the opera was presented in Naples in 1965, but "to no great acclaim". The work was given a production by the Rome Opera in 1989 and revived at the Pesaro Festival in 2009 with a cast including Juan Diego Flórez, Kate Aldrich and Gregory Kunde.

== Roles ==
Role	Voice type	Premiere Cast, 16 February 1822 (Conductor: Nicola Festa)
Polidoro, King of Lesbos	bass	Antonio Ambrosi
Zelmira, his daughter	soprano	Isabella Colbran
Emma, her confidant	contralto	Anna Maria Cecconi
Ilo, Prince of Troy and husband of Zelmira	tenor	Giovanni David
Antenore, a usurper from Mytilene	baritenor	Andrea Nozzari
Leucippo, his confidant, a general	bass-baritone	Michele Benedetti
Eacide, a follower of Prince Ilo	tenor	Gaetano Chizzola
High priest of Jupiter	bass	Massimo Orlandini
Priests, populace, Mytilene army, Ilo's followers, Zelmira's young son (silent)

== Synopsis ==
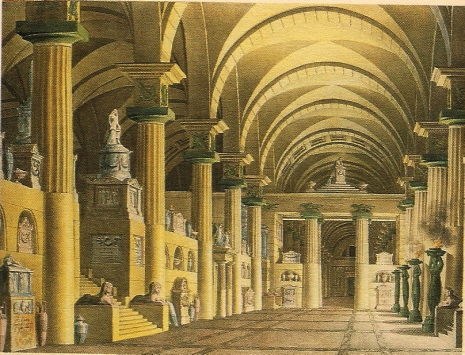
Set for the mausoleum (lithograph by Pasquale Canna, 1771 - 1830)

The opera's complicated plot revolves around Zelmira, her father Polidoro, the wise and beloved king of the Isle of Lesbos, and her husband, Prince Ilo. Before the action begins, Ilo had departed the island to defend his homeland. While he was gone, Azor, the lord of Mytilene and a disappointed suitor of Zelmira, had invaded Lesbos with the intention of assassinating King Polidoro and taking over his throne. Zelmira, however, had managed to conceal her father in the royal mausoleum and then told Azor that he was hiding in the temple to Ceres. Azor burnt down the temple, thinking he had killed the King, but he was in turn killed on orders from Antenore, who also aspired to the throne.

=== Act 1 ===
The Mytilene warriors are mourning the death of Azor. Antenore, with the help of Leucippo, plots to take over the throne of Lesbos by trying to incriminate Zelmira in the deaths of Azor and her father. At first, even Emma, Zelmira's confidante, believes the accusations. Fearing for the safety of her young son, Zelmira reveals to Emma that her father is still alive and asks her to take the child into hiding. Prince Ilo returns to the island. Zelmira is afraid to tell him of the accusations against her or to defend herself. Instead, Prince Ilo hears only Antenore's version of the story. Antenore is crowned King of Lesbos. Leucippo attempts to murder Ilo, but is stopped by Zelmira. Found with the dagger in her hand, Zelmira is now also accused of attempting to murder her husband and is imprisoned.

=== Act 2 ===
Leucippo intercepts a letter from Zelmira to Ilo in which she tells him that her father is still alive and that the accusations against her are false. He and Antenore temporarily free her from prison and trick her into revealing her father's hiding place. Both father and daughter are recaptured and await their deaths at the hands of the plotters. Meanwhile, Prince Ilo is distraught at what he believes to be the death of Polidoro and the unhappy end to his marriage. Emma appears and tells Prince Ilo the truth about Zelmira. He and his men rescue Zelmira and Polidoro. Zelmira is happily reunited with her husband and child, while both Antenore and Leucippo are led off in chains.

== Recordings ==
Year	Cast: Zelmira, Ilo, Emma, Antenore, Polidoro	Conductor, Opera House and Orchestra	Label
1965	Virginia Zeani, Nicola Tagger, Anna Rota, Gastone Limarilli, Paolo Washington	Carlo Franci, Orchestra and Chorus of the Teatro San Carlo (Recording of a performance at Naples, 10 April)	Audio CD: Great Opera Performances; Cat: G.O.P. 780; Opera d'Oro; Cat: OPD 1455
1989	Cecilia Gasdia, William Matteuzzi, Bernarda Fink, Chris Merritt, Jose Garcia	Claudio Scimone, I Solisti Veneti	Audio CD: Erato; Cat: 45419
2003	Elizabeth Futral, Antonino Siragusa, Manuela Custer, Bruce Ford, Marco Vinco	Maurizio Benini, Scottish Chamber Orchestra	Audio CD: Opera Rara; Cat: ORC 27
2009	Kate Aldrich, Juan Diego Flórez, Marianna Pizzolato, Gregory Kunde, Alex Esposito	Roberto Abbado, Orchestra and Chorus of the Teatro Comunale di Bologna, (Recording of a performance at the Rossini Opera Festival in the Adriatic Arena, Pesaro, August)	DVD: Decca, Cat: 0440 074 3465 9
2020	Silvia Dalla Benetta, Mert Süngü, Marina Comparato, Joshua Stewart, Federico Sacchi	Gianluigi Gelmetti, Virtuosi Brunensis, Górecki Chamber Choir, Recorded live at the Rossini in Wildbad Festival	Audio CD:Naxos Records; Cat:8660468-70
