= Marco Bordogni =

Italian operatic tenor and singing teacher (1789–1856)

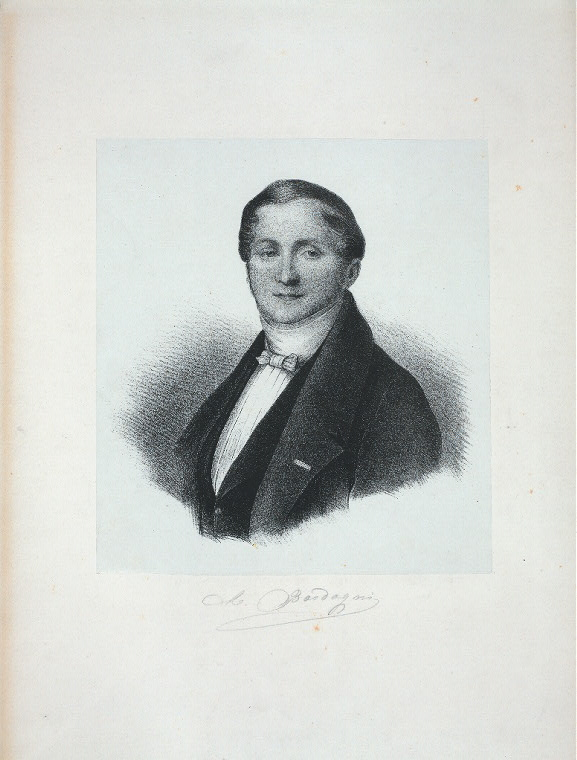
- Bordogni c.1838
- Born: Giulio Marco Bordogni; 23 January 1789; Gazzaniga, Italy
- Died: 31 July 1856 (aged 67); Paris, France
- Occupations: opera singer (tenor); vocal pedagogue

Giulio Marco Bordogni (23 January 1789 – 31 July 1856), usually called just Marco Bordogni, was an Italian operatic tenor and singing teacher of great popularity and success, whose mature career was based in Paris.

== Biography ==
Bordogni was born in Gazzaniga, near Bergamo, Italy. He was a late exponent of that formidable generation of tenors that flourished in Bergamo between the two centuries. It originated with Giacomo David, Jesus and Adamo Bianchi, and continued, in the first decades of the 19th century, with such leading figures as Andrea Nozzari, Giovanni David (Giacomo's son and pupil), Eliodoro Bianchi, Domenico Donzelli, Giovanni Battista Rubini and Bordogni himself. Gaetano Crivelli too can be considered an honorary member of the group, having been born in the neighbouring Brescia.

Bordogni made his operatic debut in Novara in 1808 without initially meeting with much success. In 1813 he distinguished himself as a performer of the role of Argirio in Rossini's Tancredi at the Ferrara revival with a tragic ending and at the inauguration of the Teatro Re in Milan, and later became very active in promoting that composer's music. He appeared in many of Rossini's operas on their first presentation in various towns and theatres, mainly performing the roles originally sung by Giovanni David. In 1825 he created the role of Conte di Libenskof in Rossini's Il viaggio a Reims. He sang for many years at the Théâtre des Italiens in Paris. He became a teacher at the Paris Conservatoire in 1823 and continued to teach there until shortly before his death, which occurred in Paris. His pupils included Juliette Borghèse and Hermine Küchenmeister-Rudersdorf.

He was the author of a published singing method and composed many sets of vocalises which remained in use for singers for a century afterwards. He was probably the most influential teacher of the English tenor Sims Reeves, who went to him in 1843: Other students include Sophie Cruvelli and Giovanni Matteo Mario.

Bordogni was awarded the Légion d'Honneur on 10 May 1839 by M. de Gasparin, at the same time that it was awarded to the Director of the Opéra Duponchel, and to the composer Hector Berlioz, who wrote that Bordogni was the best singing-master of that period. His daughter Louise Bordogni sang successfully in New York City in 1834.

== Town or theatre first performances of Rossini operas ==
The following list comprises the town or theatre's first performances of Rossini operas in which Marco Bordogni appeared. From this list one can recognize the singer's considerable virtuosity, ranging between his traditional baritonal tenor roles, and the leading tenor contraltino parts written by Rossini in tragic, serio-comic and comic operas.

In addition to the Rossini roles, Bordogni also gave first performances at the Théâtre-Italien in Paër’s Agnese di Fitz-Henry (Ernesto) in 1819; in Mayr’s Medea in Corinto (Giasone) in 1823; in Mercadante’s Elisa e Claudio ossia L'amore protetto dall'amicizia (Claudio) (also in 1823); and in Vaccai’s Giulietta e Romeo (Capellio) in 1827.

Rôle	Opera’s title	Theatre	Town	First performance’s date
Argirio	Tancredi	Teatro Re (inauguration)	Milan	18 December 1813
Argirio	Tancredi	Real Teatro San Carlo	Naples	14 April 1818
duca Bertrando	L'inganno fortunato (L’inganno felice)	Salle Louvois du Théâtre-Italien	Paris	13 May 1819
Narciso	Il turco in Italia	Salle Louvois du Théâtre-Italien	Paris	23 May 1820
Jago	Otello ossia Il moro di Venezia	Salle Louvois du Théâtre-Italien	Paris	5 June 1821
Giannetto	La gazza ladra	Salle Louvois du Théâtre-Italien	Paris	18 September 1821
Leicester	Elisabetta, regina d'Inghilterra	Salle Louvois du Théâtre-Italien	Paris	10 March 1822
Argirio	Tancredi	Salle Louvois du Théâtre-Italien	Paris	23 April 1822
Ramiro	La Cenerentola ossia La bontà in trionfo	Salle Louvois du Théâtre-Italien	Paris	8 June 1822
Osiride	Mosè in Egitto	Salle Louvois du Théâtre-Italien	Paris	20 October 1822
Giacomo V-Uberto	La donna del lago	Théâtre de l'Académie Royale de Musique	Paris	7 September 1824
Liebenskof	Il viaggio a Reims (premiere)	Salle Louvois du Théâtre-Italien	Paris	19 June 1825
Idreno	Semiramide	Salle Louvois du Théâtre-Italien	Paris	8 December 1825
Antenore	Zelmira	Salle Louvois du Théâtre-Italien	Paris	14 March 1826
Almaviva	Le barbier de Séville ou La précaution inutile (in French)	Théâtre de l'Académie Royale de Musique	Paris	14 January 1828

== Legacy ==
In 1928, the Melodious Études for Trombone were published in New York. These études were arranged by Joannès Rochut, then principal trombonist of the Boston Symphony Orchestra. The études had been transcribed directly from Bordogni's "Vocalises". Since then, the "Vocalises" have been transcribed for many instruments and are a standard method of study for many music students.

== Notes and references ==
- Casaglia, Gherardo (2005)."Marco Bordogni". L'Almanacco di Gherardo Casaglia (in Italian).
