= Enrico Crivelli =

Italian opera singer

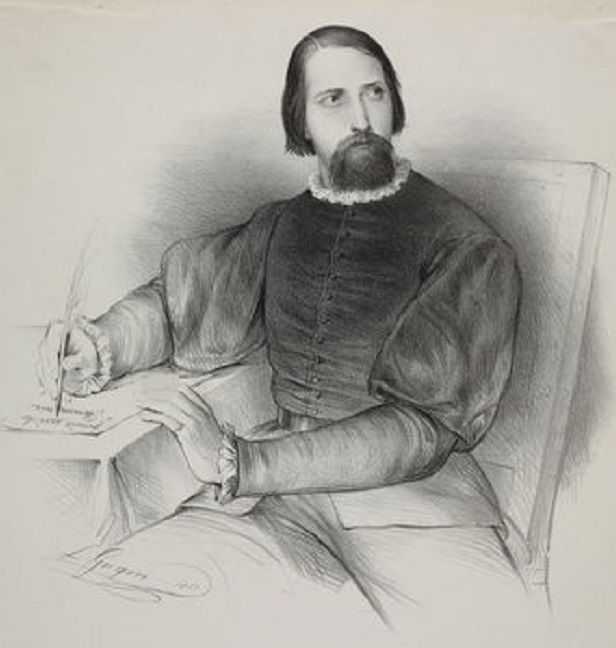
- Born: 20 July 1820; Brescia, Italy
- Died: c.1870 Milan, Italy
- Occupation: opera singer (baritone)
- Relatives: Gaetano Crivelli (father)

Enrico Crivelli (20 July 1820 – c.1870) was an Italian opera singer who sang leading baritone and bass-baritone roles in the major opera houses of Italy as well as in Spain, Russia, Germany, France, and England. He also composed collections of art songs and published two books on the art of singing. He was born in Brescia, the youngest son of the celebrated tenor Gaetano Crivelli and died in Milan after a career spanning almost 30 years.

== Life and career ==
Crivelli was born in Brescia to a musical family, the most famous of which was his father, the tenor Gaetano Crivelli. His two older brothers also became musicians. Domenico Crivelli (1793–1852) was a composer and singing teacher. Giovanni Crivelli (1801–1833) was also a baritone opera singer who died in London at the age of 32. Crivelli initially studied law at the wish of his father. However, following his father's death in 1836 and with the encouragement of Simon Mayr, he began singing studies with Eliodoro Bianchi. He made his stage debut in 1841 as Filippo in Bellini's Beatrice di Tenda at the Teatro Filarmonico in Verona.

He went on to sing leading baritone roles in the major opera houses of Northern Italy, appearing at La Fenice, La Scala, and the Teatro Regio di Torino amongst others, as well as in Spain, Russia, Germany, France, and England. He sang a wide repertoire ranging from bel canto roles such as Alphonse in La favorita, Severo in Poliuto, Figaro in Il barbiere di Siviglia, and Iago in Rossini's Otello to Verdian roles which included the title role in Nabucco, Miller in Luisa Miller, Conte di Luna in Il trovatore, Guido di Monforte in I vespri siciliani, and Rolando in La battaglia di Legnano. Crivelli also created a number of roles in the world premieres of now-forgotten operas such Tristano in Federico Ricci's Griselda. Beginning in the 1850s, he essayed several bass-baritone roles including Oroveso in Norma and the title role in Mosè in Egitto (both at the Theatre Royal, Malta in 1850), Assur in Semiramide (Teatro Regio di Parma in 1859), and Oberthal in Le prophète (Teatro Regio di Torino in 1862).

Crivelli composed a number of art songs and published two books on the art of singing, Metodo di canto and Grammatica musicale. He was member of the music academies of Rome, Florence, Bologna, Turin, and Brescia and an honorary member of the academies of Zaragoza and Cordoba in Spain. He died in Milan c.1870. The exact date of his death is unknown.

== Roles created ==
Roles sung by Crivelli in world premieres include:

- Alberigo in Francesco Malipiero's Alberigo da Romano; Venice, La Fenice, 26 December 1846
- Tristano in Federico Ricci's Griselda; Venice, La Fenice, 13 March 1847
- Simacan in Giovanni Sebastiani's Atala; Rome, Teatro Argentina, 7 July 1850
- Arturo Sainville in Mariano Neri's Un equivoco; Rome, Teatro Argentina, 9 February 1851
- Eliseo Barthon in Angelo Villanis's La vergine di Kent; Turin, Teatro Regio, 1 March 1856
- Filippo in Serafino De Ferrari's Il matrimonio per concorso; Venice, La Fenice, 7 August 1858
- Corso Donati in Antonino Marchisio's Piccarda Donati; Parma, Teatro Regio, 24 February 1860
