= Zoraida di Granata =

Opera by Gaetano Donizetti

- Opera by Gaetano Donizetti
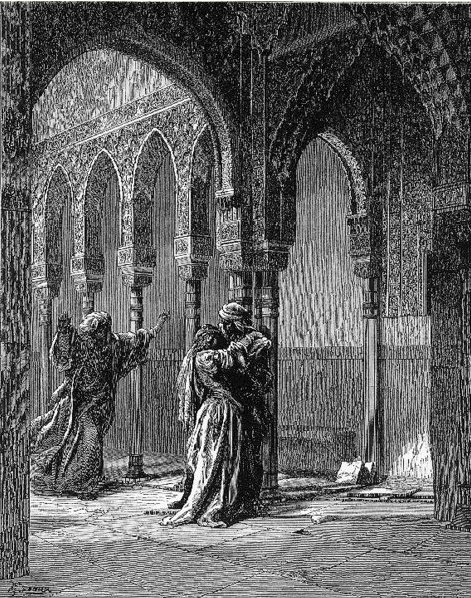
- Gustave Doré: Zoraida falls in the Captive's arms
- Librettist: Bartolomeo Merelli
- Language: Italian
- Based on: Gonzalve de Cordoue by Jean-Pierre Claris de Florian
- Premiere: 28 January 1822; Teatro Argentina, Rome

Zoraida di Granata (also Zoraide di Granata or Zoraïda di Granata) is a two-act melodramma eroico (opera seria or 'heroic' opera) by Gaetano Donizetti. The Italian libretto, partly prepared by Bartolomeo Merelli (whose delays Donizetti criticized), drew on Jean-Pierre Claris de Florian's 1791 play Gonzalve de Cordoue ou Grenade Reconquise and on Luigi Romanelli's libretto for Giuseppe Nicolini's Abenamet e Zoraide.

== History ==
When Donizetti arrived in Rome, carrying a letter of introduction from his teacher and mentor Johann Simon Mayr to poet and librettist Jacopo Ferretti, he secured his help in revising Merelli's text.

Although it was Donizetti's first theatrical success "and the opera in which he began to adopt 'Rossinian' techniques", the original 1822 version of this violent love story was never given a complete performance because Amerigo Sbigoli, the tenor originally cast in the role of Abenamet, died shortly before the first night, with no replacement available. Donizetti quickly adapted this role for contralto, though omitting three numbers in the process.

The first performance took place at the Teatro Argentina, Rome, on 28 January 1822 and it and its composer received great acclaim in the weekly Notizie del giorno:

"A new and very happy hope is rising for the Italian musical theatre. The young Maestro Gaetano Donizetti...has launched himself strongly in his truly serious opera, Zoraida. Unanimous, sincere, universal was the applause he justly collected from the capacity audience...".

The opera was presented in a revised edition at the same theatre on 7 January 1824, and given a revival in Lisbon in 1825.

== Roles ==
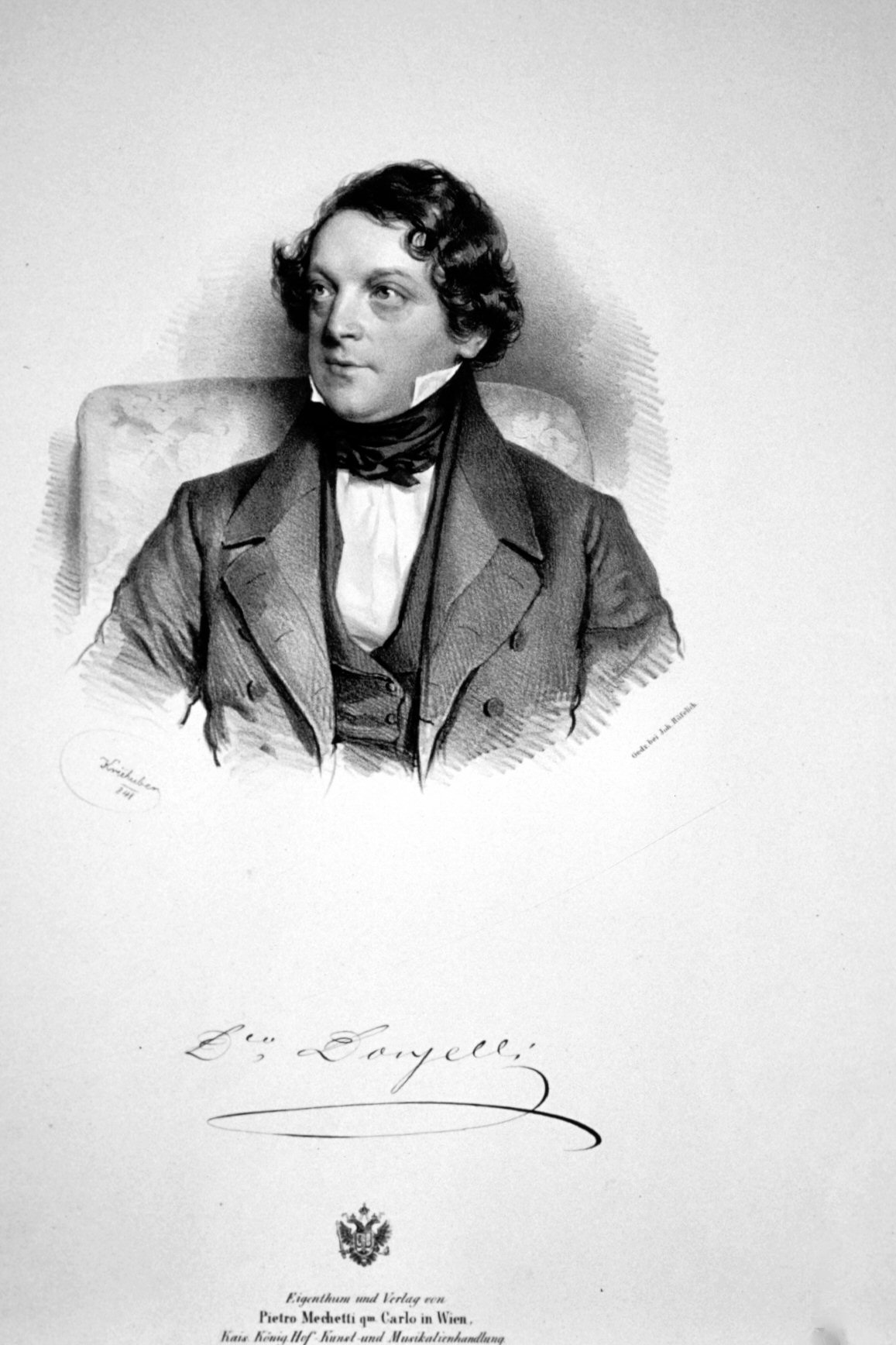
Domenico Donzelli, 1842

Role	Voice type	Premiere cast, 28 January 1822 (Conductor: - )
Almuzir, King of Granada	tenor	Domenico Donzelli
Almanzor, friend of Abenamet	bass	Gaetano Rambaldi
Zoraida, in love with, and loved by, Abenamet	soprano	Maria Ester Mombelli
Abenamet, General of the Moors	originally tenor (then substitute contralto)	Amerigo Sbigoli (Adelaide Mazzanti)
Ines, a Spanish slave and friend of Zoraida	mezzo-soprano	Gaetana Corini
Aw Zegri	bass	Alberto Torri

== Synopsis ==
Time: 1480
Place: Granada, Spain.

The murderous and duplicitous Almuzir wishes to marry Zoraida, the daughter of the late king, who in turn loves Abenamet, the victorious General of the Moors. To save Abenamet from the sentence of death passed on him consequent to the machinations of Almuzir, Zoraida agrees to the marriage. She survives Abenamet's doubts as to her fidelity and somewhat implausibly is allowed to marry him.

== Recordings ==
=== 1822 version ===
Year	Cast (Almuzir, Zoraida, Abenamet, Almanzor)	Conductor, Opera House and Orchestra	Label
1998	Bruce Ford, Majella Cullagh, Paul Austin Kelly, Matthew Hargreaves	David Parry, Geoffrey Mitchell Choir, Orchestra of the Academy of Saint Martin in the Fields	Opera Rara, ORC17; (CD 1, CD 2, CD 3 tracks 1–9)

=== 1824 version ===
The Opera Rara recording contains an additional twenty pieces from the 1822 version, with Diana Montague in the role of Abenamet (CD 3, tracks 10–14, and CD 4).
