= Juliette Borghèse =

French mezzo-soprano

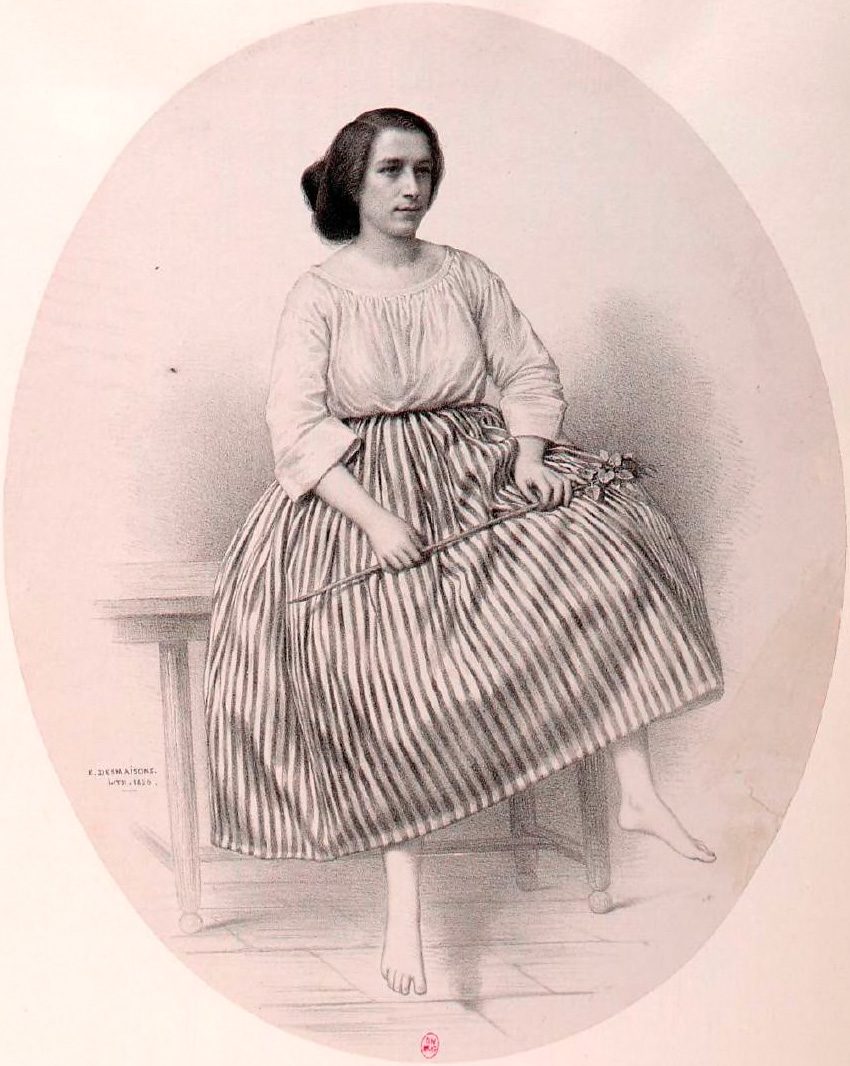
Juliette Borghèse as Rose Friquet in Les dragons de Villars

Jeanne Joseph Félix Amédée Juliette Bourgeois, known as Juliette Borghèse (born 28 June 1834) was a French mezzo-soprano.

Borghèse was born in Cloyes-sur-le-Loir, the daughter of Aimé Jean Bourgeois and Marie Amédée Proust, and studied at the Paris Conservatory under Marco Bordogni and Louis Benoît Alphonse Révial; she graduated in 1853, whereupon she traveled to New Orleans, performing there for one season. Returning to Rouen, she soon bowed at the Paris Opéra, where she remained briefly, and at the Théâtre-Lyrique, where she debuted in the role of Rose Friquet in the world premiere of Les dragons de Villars by Aimé Maillart. On 22 September 1857 she married marine officer Louis Pierre Alexandre Sauvage Dufour, whereupon she began appearing under the name Juliette Borghèse-Dufour. She continued on the roster of the Théâtre-Lyrique, performing such works as Euryanthe, Oberon, and Preciosa, all by Carl Maria von Weber. After three years in Paris she embarked upon a touring career, appearing in Marseille, Bordeaux, Lyon, Nantes, Brussels (at La Monnaie), and Anvers; her repertoire consisted of such works as La favorite, Le prophète, and Robert le diable, among others. She returned to the Théâtre-Lyrique in 1869; in 1872 she was once more in Bordeaux, after which nothing further is known of her career.
