= Americo Sbigoli =

Italian opera singer

Americo (Amerigo) Sbigoli (died January 1822) was an Italian tenor.

He is best known for the unusual manner of his death, as documented by the composer Giovanni Pacini. Singing the second tenor part in a performance of Pacini's opera Cesare in Egitto, Sbigoli took part in a vocal quintet with first tenor Domenico Donzelli. In the course of the quintet, Sbigoli's character was to sing a phrase "closely resembling one sung just previously by Donzelli". Attempting to match Donzelli's powerful voice, Sbigoli overstrained himself, burst a blood vessel in his neck, and died shortly thereafter.

While tragic in and of itself, this incident also had a small but significant impact on the course of music history, as Sbigoli was scheduled to sing the role of Abenamet in the premiere of Gaetano Donizetti's opera Zoraida di Granata at the Teatro Argentina. No other tenors were available to replace Sbigoli, and the premiere was no more than a week or two thereafter, on January 28; thus, Donizetti had to hurriedly revise the opera, transforming the tenor Abenamet —a military general— into a newly created role for female contralto. Despite this last-minute revision, the opera was hugely acclaimed upon its premiere, and marked Donizetti's first major success, boosting his career immeasurably.

According to the diary of Prince Agostino Chigi, the Teatro Argentina held a benefit on Feb. 15, 1822 for the widow and children of Americo Sbigoli, raising six thousand lire.
