= Maillart =

Maillart is a surname, and may refer to

- Aimé Maillart (1817–1871), French composer
- Ella Maillart (1903–1997), Swiss travel writer
- Robert Maillart (1872–1940), Swiss civil engineer
