= Cividate =

Cividate may refer to one of several towns/comunes in Italy:

- Cividate Camuno, in the province of Brescia
- Cividate al Piano, in the province of Bergamo
