= Domenico Crivelli =

English opera singer (died 1856)

Domenico Francesco Maria Crivelli (1793/1796 – 31 December 1856), often referred to simply as Signor Crivelli was an Italian born English opera singer and singing teacher.

== Career ==
He was born in Lombardy, Italy, and came to England in 1817 with his father Gaetano Crivelli (1768–1836), who was then principal tenor at the King's Theatre. His father had studied with Andrea Nozzari and Giuseppe Aprile and later taught the tenor Domenico Donzelli.

Domenico became principal professor of singing at the Royal Academy of Music at its foundation in 1823 and continued there until his death, having taught most of the English opera singers of that period. He died on 31 December 1856, at his home, 71, Upper Norton Street, Portland Place, London. He wrote a method of singing, "L'Arte del Canto" or "The Art of Singing" (1841).
