= Ciro in Babilonia =

1812 opera by Gioachino Rossini

Ciro in Babilonia, ossia La caduta di Baldassare
- Azione sacra by Gioachino Rossini
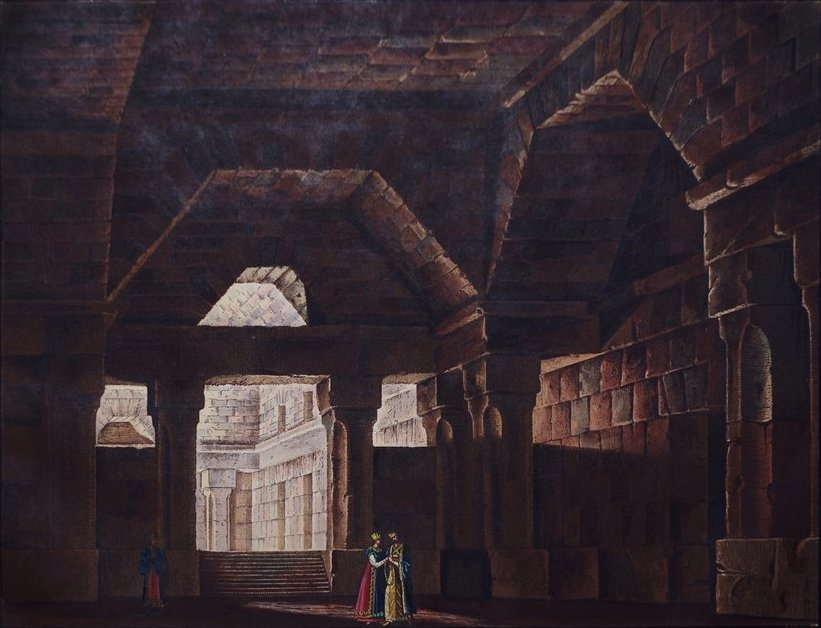
- Set design by Alessandro Sanquirico at La Scala, 1818
- Librettist: Francesco Aventi
- Language: Italian
- Premiere: 14 March 1812; Teatro Comunale, Ferrara

Ciro in Babilonia, ossia La caduta di Baldassare (Cyrus in Babylon, or The Downfall of Belshazzar) is an azione sacra in two acts by Gioachino Rossini with a libretto by Francesco Aventi. It was first performed at the Teatro Comunale in Ferrara during Lent, 1812. The exact date of the premiere is unknown but is believed to be 14 March. During Lent it was the custom for Italian opera houses either to close or to stage works on themes from the Bible. Ciro in Babilonia is one of two Lenten operas by Rossini (along with Mosè in Egitto) and is based on the Biblical story of the overthrow of the Babylonian king Belshazzar by the Persian ruler Cyrus the Great.

== Performance history ==
In a concert form, the work's UK premiere took place on 30 January 1823 at the Theatre Royal Drury Lane in London. The quasi-opera premiered in the United States on 7 July 2012 at the Caramoor Center for Music and the Arts as part of the Festival, starring contralto Ewa Podleś in the title role, tenor Michael Spyres as Baldassare (Belshazzar), and soprano Jessica Pratt as Amira, with Will Crutchfield conducting. Performances with the same principal singers opened in a more elaborate staging on 10 August 2012 at the Rossini Festival in Pesaro.

== Roles ==
Role	Voice type	Premiere Cast, 14 (?) March 1812 (Conductor: – )
Baldassare, King of Assyria	tenor	Eliodoro Bianchi
Ciro, King of Persia	contralto	Marietta Marcolini
Amira, wife of Ciro, imprisoned by Baldassare	soprano	Elisabetta Manfredini-Guarmani
Argene, confidant of Amira	mezzo-soprano	Anna Savinelli
Zambri, Babylonian prince	bass	Giovanni Layner
Arbace, captain in Baldassare's army, in love with Argene	tenor	Francesco Savinelli
Daniello, prophet	bass	Giovanni Fraschi

== Synopsis ==
Time: 539 B.C.
Place: Babylon

https://www.rossinioperafestival.it/en/stories/ciro-in-babilonia/

The plot of "Ciro in Babilonia" concerns the events, drawn from the Bible, surrounding the invasion of Babylon by Ciro (Cyrus), king of Persia. During the fighting, Ciro's wife, Amira, and their son are captured by Baldassare (Belshazzar), king of Babylon. Under a plan hatched by Arbace, Ciro's general, Ciro disguises himself as an ambassador to the Babylonians, so as to embed himself in Baldassare's court and plot the release of his wife and son. After a series of tribulations and plot twists (including divine intervention), Baldassare is defeated, and in triumph, Ciro is joyfully reunited with his wife and son.

== Recordings ==
Year	Cast: Baldassare, Ciro, Amira, Argene	Conductor, Opera House and Orchestra	Label
1988	Ernesto Palacio, Caterina Calvi, Daniela Dessi, Oriana Ferraris	Carlo Rizzi, Orchestra Sinfonica di Sanremo and Coro Francesco Cilea di Reggio (Recording of a performance in the Teatro Chiabrera, Savona, 30 October)	Audio CD: Hunt, Cat: 105; Arkadia, Cat: CDAK 105.2; Celestial Audio, Cat: CA 502
2004	Riccardo Botta, Annarita Gemmabella, Luisa Islam-Ali-Zade, Maria Soulis	Antonino Fogliani, Württembergische Philharmonie Orchestra and ARS Brunensis Chamber Choir (Recorded at 3 performances at the Rossini in Wildbad Festival, July)	Audio CD: Naxos Records; Cat: 8.660203/4
2008	Cyril Auvity, Nora Gubisch, Elena de la Merced, Sophie Daneman	Jean-Claude Malgoire, La Grande Écurie et La Chambre du Roy and Choeur de Chambre de Namur (Recording of a concert performance in the Théâtre des Champs-Élysées, 12 January)	Audio CD: Premiere Opera; Cat: ??
2012	Michael Spyres, Ewa Podleś, Jessica Pratt, Carmen Romeu	Will Crutchfield, Orchestra and Chorus of the Teatro Comunale di Bologna, (Recording of a performance at the Rossini Festival in Pesaro, August)	DVD: Opus Arte, Cat: OA1108D; Blu-ray: Cat OABD7123D
