= Teresa Seneke =

Italian composer (1848–1875)

Teresa Seneke (1848 – November 1875) was an Italian composer who is best known for her opera Le Due Amiche (The Two Friends).

== Biography ==
Seneke was born in Chieti and died at age 27 in Rome. Little is known about her education or personal life. Le Due Amiche premiered in Rome at the Teatro Argentina in 1869, when Seneke was only 21. In addition to this opera, she composed vocal, piano, and dance music. Her compositions were originally published by Olivieri and more recently by Alfred Music.

== Works ==
Seneke's compositions include:

=== Opera ===
- Le Due Amiche (libretto by Carlo D'Ormeville)

=== Songs ===
- "Ad Una Giovinetta"
- "'Addio"
- "Danze"
- "Il Disinganno"
- "Il Lamento"
- "Il Mio Destino"
- "Il Pensiero Dominante"
- "La Preghiera"
- "Melodie"
- "Oltre la Tomba"
- "Rimembranze di Roma"
- "S'io T'amo?"
- "Stornelli"
- "Una Corona di Fiori"
