= Ewa Podleś =

Polish coloratura contralto singer (1952–2024)

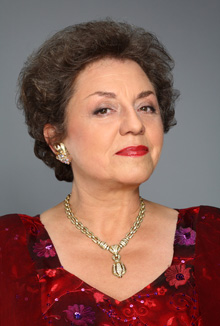
- Podleś in 2010
- Born: 26 April 1952; Warsaw, Poland
- Died: 19 January 2024 (aged 71); Warsaw, Poland
- Education: Warsaw Academy of Music
- Occupation: Operatic coloratura contralto
- Years active: 1975–2017
- Organizations: Grand Theatre, Warsaw
- Spouse: Jerzy Marchwiński

Ewa Maria Podleś (Polish: [ˈɛva ˈpɔdlɛɕ]; 26 April 1952 – 19 January 2024) was a Polish operatic coloratura contralto who had an active international career both on the opera stage and in recital. She was known for the agility of her voice and a vocal range which spanned more than three octaves. She excelled in Rossini roles such as Rosina in Il barbiere di Siviglia, the title role of La Cenerentola, Isabella in L'italiana in Algeri and the title role of Tancredi. She was able to perform roles that Handel had written for castratos, such as Rinaldo and Giulio Cesare. Podleś appeared on leading stages of the world and made many recordings.

== Life and career ==
Ewa Maria Podleś was born in Warsaw on 26 April 1952. She studied at the Warsaw Academy of Music with Alina Bolechowska. During her studies she made her stage debut on the chamber stage of the Grand Theatre, Warsaw, as Dorabella in Mozart's Così fan tutte in 1975. She became known when she won the bronze medal at the 1978 International Tchaikovsky Competition in Moscow, which opened the way to winning in Geneva and Athens the same year. She achieved second place in Barcelona in 1981.

In 1984 she became a member of the Grand Theatre in Warsaw, where she succeeded especially in the coloratura roles by Rossini, Rosina in Il barbiere di Siviglia and the title role of La Cenerentola, but also as Bizet's Carmen. In 1984 she made her debut at the Metropolitan Opera (Met) in New York City in the title role of Handel's Rinaldo, repeated at the Théâtre du Châtelet in Paris. She performed the same year at the Aix-en-Provence Festival as Rosina, and as Adalgisa in Bellini's Norma in Vancouver. She rarely performed in Poland until the mid 1990s.

Though known mainly for her interpretation of Baroque works, Podleś's repertoire ranged from Handel's Giulio Cesare to songs by Shostakovich. The coloratura contralto roles (some of them trouser roles) in Rossini's operas remained central to her repertoire. Critics noted the expressive power of her voice and her ability to cope with the florid singing demanded of Rossini's heroes and heroines. Her voice had a wide range, spanning more than three octaves, and was called rare in type and beauty. It appears that her lowest note sung on stage is a B♭2 ("Pour une femme de mon nom" at La Scala) and her highest is a D6 ("Sudò il guerriero" from Il Ritorno di Tobia by Haydn). She also performed and gave a lot of recital, notably with her husband, later with the pianist Garrick Ohlsson and Anna Marchwiński.

In 1996, she sang the role of the Marquise de Berkenfeld in Donizetti's La fille du régiment at La Scala in Milan, a performance which was preserved on DVD. Her return to the Met took place on 24 September 2008, when she sang the role of La Cieca in Ponchielli's La Gioconda. Her later performances included the role of Bertarido in Handel's Rodelinda, the title role in Rossini's Tancredi, the title role in Handel's Giulio Cesare, Isabella in Rossini's L'italiana in Algeri, Erda in Wagner's Ring cycle (at the Seattle Opera), Klytämnestra in Strauss' Elektra (with the Canadian Opera Company and Opéra de Nice) and Madame de la Haltière in Massenet's Cendrillon (at London's Royal Opera House and Opéra-Comique) as well as Grandma ("Babulenka") in Prokofiev's The Gambler at Opéra de Monte-Carlo. She performed the title role in Rossini's Ciro in Babilonia when the work was revived 2012, in the US premiere at the Caramoor International Music Festival in July and at the Rossini Opera Festival in Pesaro, Italy, in August. Podleś was scheduled to sing Azucena in Verdi's Il trovatore at the Atlanta Opera in 2009, but withdrew.

Podleś's final performance was in La fille du régiment at Barcelona's Liceu in May 2017. On 1 June, she announced that she was pausing her singing career ahead of an upcoming orthopaedic operation, while continuing to teach and with an intention to return to performing. However, her website listed no further appearances during the remainder of her life.

Ewa Podleś was the subject of a 2015 biography, Ewa Podleś, Contralto Assoluto, written by Brigitte Cormier.

=== Personal life ===
Podleś and her husband, the pianist Jerzy Marchwiński, lived in Warsaw. Marchwiński died on 7 November 2023. Podleś died from lung cancer at a hospice facility in Warsaw on 19 January 2024, at the age of 71.

== Recordings ==
Podleś made many recordings, CDs and DVDs of complete operas as well as symphonic works, arias and songs. She took part in the first recording of Krzysztof Penderecki's Te Deum, conducted by the composer. Several recordings earned international awards, such as Airs Célébres a Grand Prix du Disque, Mélodies Russes (Russian songs) a Grand prix de l'Académie française); a recording of Rossini's Tancredi earned the CD Classic's "The Best Buy 1995" award and a nomination for the 1996 Grammy Award. Arias by Rossini won her both the Preis der deutschen Schallplattenkritik and the "Record of the Year" 1996 award of Studio magazine. Mahler's Symphony No. 2 earned her the "Palmarés Nouvelle Académie du Disque".

=== CD ===
- Airs Célèbres (Handel, Vivaldi, Purcell, Gluck, and Marcello) with Patrick Peire
- Chopin: Mélodies with Abdel Rahman El Bacha
- Chopin: Songs with Garrick Ohlsson
- de Falla: El amor brujo with Krzysztof Penderecki
- Duets (Mendelssohn, Brahms, Schumann) with Joanna Kozłowska and Jerzy Marchwinski (piano)
- Gluck: Armide as La Haine with Marc Minkowski
- Gluck: Orfeo ed Euridice as Orfeo with Peter Maag
- Gluck: Orphée et Eurydice as Orphée with Patrick Peire
- Handel Arias from Rinaldo and Orlando with Constantin Orbelian
- Handel: Ariodante as Polinesso with Marc Minkowski
- Mahler: Symphony No. 2: "Resurrection" with Jean-Claude Casadesus
- Mahler: Symphony No. 3 with Antoni Wit
- Mozart: Requiem with Michel Corboz and L'Ensemble vocal et instrumental de Lausanne
- Offenbach: Orphée aux enfers as L'Opinion publique
- Penderecki: Seven Gates of Jerusalem with Kazimierz Kord
- Penderecki: Te Deum and Lacrimosa
- Ewa Podleś & Garrick Ohlsson Live
- Marta Ptaszynska: Concerto for Marimba; Songs of Despair and Loneliness
- Prokofiev: Alexandr Nevsky with Jean-Claude Casadesus
- Puccini: Il trittico with Bruno Bartoletti
- Respighi: Il Tramonto with Michał Nesterowicz
- Rossini Arias for Contralto with Pier Giorgio Morandi
- Rossini Gala with Wojciech Michniewski
- Rossini: Tancredi as Tancredi with Alberto Zedda
- Russian Arias with Constantin Orbelian
- Russian Melodies (Tchaikovsky, Mussorgsky, Rachmaninoff), with Graham Johnson
- A Treasury of Polish Songs with Ewa Pobłocka

=== DVD ===
- Handel: Giulio Cesare in Egitto as Cornelia from Barcelona Opera
- Donizetti: La fille du régiment as Marquise de Berkenfeld
- Ponchielli: La Gioconda as La Cieca from Barcelona Opera
- Rossini: Ciro in Babilonia as Ciro from Pesaro Rossini Opera Festival
- Massenet: Cendrillon as Madame de la Haltière from Royal Opera Covent Garden
- Tchaikovsky: The Queen of Spades as the Countess from a 2011 production of the Gran Teatre del Liceu, Barcelona
