= Les Dragons de Villars =

Opera by Lous-Aimé Maillart

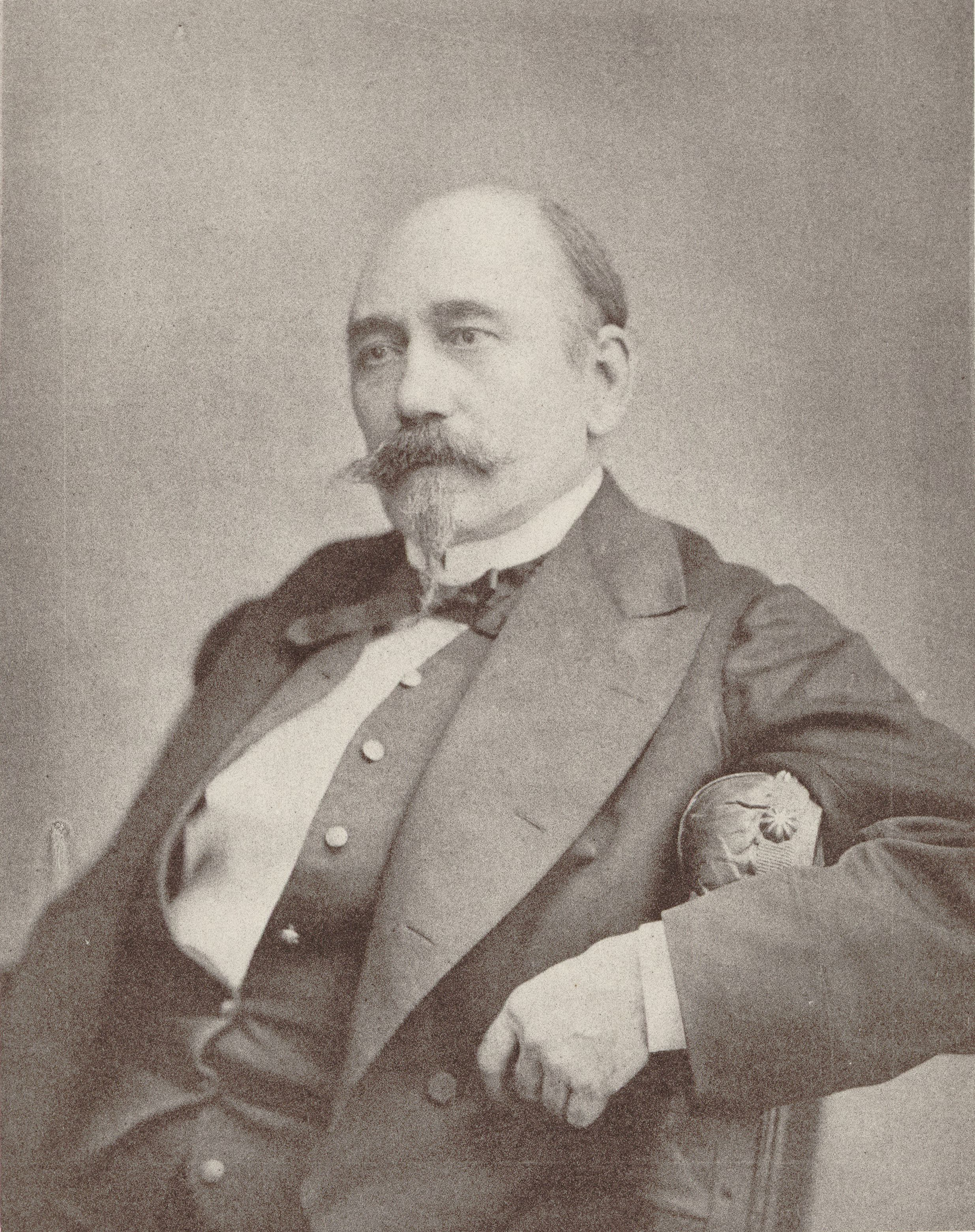
Aimé Maillart

Les Dragons de Villars (The Dragoons of Villars) is an opéra-comique in three acts by Aimé Maillart to a libretto by Lockroy and Eugène Cormon. The story of the opera was said to have been borrowed from La Petite Fadette by George Sand, updated by the librettists to the time of Louis XIV. It was premiered by the Théâtre Lyrique in Paris on 19 September 1856. It is also known by the English title The Hermit's Bell.

== Background ==
The piece was first offered to the director of the Opéra-Comique, Émile Perrin, who found it too dark, even after having the composer play some of it to him. It was next offered to one of the Seveste brothers at the Théâtre-Lyrique. They also rejected it, as did their successor Pierre Pellegrin. Some years later, the authors met Léon Carvalho, who had just taken over the direction of the Théâtre-Lyrique, and who accepted the completed piece without reading a word or hearing a note.

== Performance history ==
The premiere of Les dragons de Villars was very successful. It was the debut of Juliette Borghèse, who was said "to have created an enthusiasm" as Rose Friquet. The opera, which had notched up 153 performances at the Théâtre Lyrique by 1863, was to become popular throughout Europe, as well as being staged in New Orleans (1859) and New York (1868). Revived at the Opéra-Comique in 1868, it achieved 377 performances at that theatre by 1917. The work was given in London in French by a visiting French company in 1875 and in English as The Dragoons in 1879. Gustav Mahler conducted the work in Budapest in 1888, and Wilhelm Furtwängler conducted it in Strasbourg in 1910. A production was mounted at the Théâtre de la Porte Saint-Martin in Paris on 3 June 1935. The opera was in the repertory of the Opéra de la Monnaie in Brussels from 1942 to 1953. It was staged in 1986 in the composer's native Montpellier by the Théâtre Lyrique du Midi.

== Roles ==
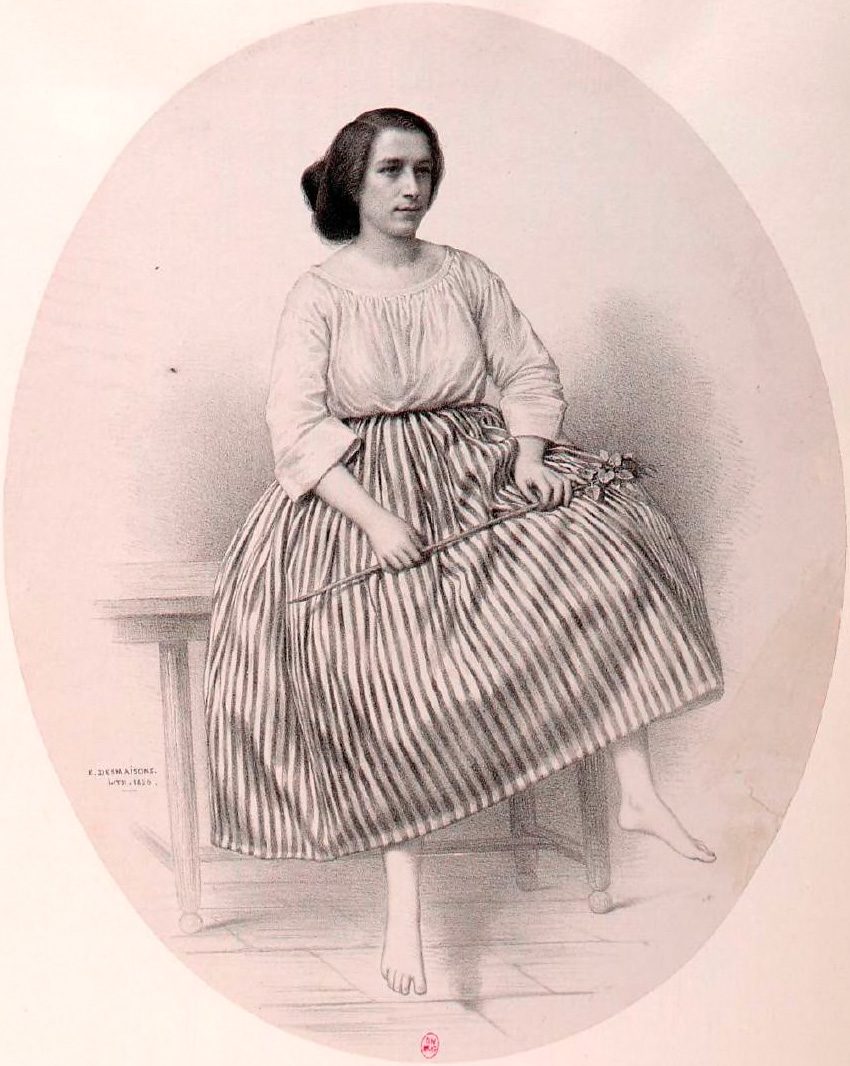
Juliette Borghèse as Rose Friquet (1856)

Roles, voice types, premiere cast
Role	Voice type	Premiere cast, 19 September 1856 Conductor: Adolphe Deloffre	Opéra-Comique, 5 June 1868 Conductor: Adolphe Deloffre
Thibaut, a rich farmer	tenor	Adolphe Girardot	Ponchard
Georgette, his wife	soprano	Caroline Girard	Caroline Girard
Rose Friquet, a poor peasant	soprano	Juliette Borghèse	Galli-Marié
Sylvain, labourer with Thibaut	tenor	Scott	Paul Lhérie
Belamy, sergeant	baritone	Grillon	Auguste Barré
Herdsman	bass	Henry Adam	Bernard
Dragoon	–	Quinchez	Michaud
Lieutenant	–	Garcin	Eugène
Chorus: dragoons and peasants

== Synopsis ==
The scene is laid in a French mountain-village near the frontier with Savoy towards the close of the war in the Cévennes in 1704.

=== Act 1 ===
Peasant women in the service of Thibaut, a rich country squire, are collecting fruit. Georgette, Thibaut's young wife, controls their work. She treats them to a favourite Provençal song, in which a young girl, forgetting her vows made to a young soldier, gives her hand to another suitor. She is interrupted by the sound of trumpets. Thibaut hurries in and tells the women to hide themselves at once, because soldiers are marching into the village. He conceals his own wife in the pigeon-house. A detachment of dragoons arrive, and Belamy, their corporal, asks for food and wine at Thibaut's house. He learns that there is nothing to be had and also that all the women have fled, fearing the unprincipled soldiers of King Louis XIV who have been sent in pursuit of a group of Protestant fugitives – or Camisards – hiding in the mountains; and that the 'Dragons de Villars' are said to be an especially wild and dissolute set.

Belamy, disgusted, and after having had dinner and a sleep in Thibaut's own bed, decides to march on. The squire gladly offers to accompany the soldiers to St Gratien's grotto near the hermitage, where they have orders to search for the Huguenot refugees. While Belamy is sleeping, Thibaut calls his servant Sylvain and scolds him because he has now repeatedly been absent over-long on his errands; finally he orders him to saddle the mules.

Sylvain stammers out that they have gone astray in the mountains, but he is sure of their being found. While Thibaut expresses his fear that they have been stolen by the fugitives, Rose Friquet, an orphan-girl and poor goat-keeper, brings the mules, riding on the back of one of them. Thibaut reproaches her, but Sylvain thanks her warmly, and though she mockingly repudiates his thanks, he discovers that she has taken the mules to divert Thibaut's attention from Sylvain's secret missions to bring food each day to the refugees. Sylvain carries food every day to the refugees, and Rose, despised and supposed to be wicked and malicious, protects him because he once intercepted a stone, which was meant for her head.

While the soldiers are eating, Belamy, who has found Georgette's bonnet, demands an explanation. Thibaut finds a pretext for going out, but Rose lets out to Belamy Georgette's hiding-place. The young wife cries for help and Rose runs in to fetch Thibaut. Belamy is delighted with the pretty Georgette, but she tells anxiously, that all the women in the village must remain true to their husbands, for the hermit of St Gratien (though dead for two hundred years), is keeping watch, and at any case of infidelity will ring a little bell, which is heard far and wide. Belamy would like to try the experiment with Georgette, and asks her to accompany him to the hermitage instead of her husband. After having found the other women in the village, the soldiers, to Thibaut's annoyance, decide to stay and amuse themselves. But Sylvain rejoices, and after a sign from Rose resolves to warn the refugees in the evening.

=== Act 2 ===
Rose and Sylvain meet near St Gratien. Rose tells him that all the paths are blocked by sentries, but promises to show the refugees a path that only she and her goats know. Sylvain, thanks her and tries to induce her to care more for her appearance, praising her pretty features. Rose is delighted to hear this, and there follows a charming duet. Sylvain promises to be her friend and then leaves to seek the Camisards. Thibaut now appears, seeking his wife, whom he has seen going away with Belamy. Finding Rose, he imagines he has mistaken her for his wife, but she laughingly corrects him and he proceeds to search for Georgette. Belamy now comes and courts Thibaut's wife. But Rose, seeing them, resolves to free the path for the others. No sooner has Belamy tried to snatch a kiss from his companion than Rose pulls the rope of the hermit's bell until Georgette takes flight, while Thibaut rushes up at the sound of the bell. Belamy reassures him, intimating that the bell may have rung for Rose (though it never rings for maids) and accompanies him to the village. But he turns to look for the supposed hermit, and instead finds Rose, who does not see him. To his great surprise Sylvain leads the whole troop of refugees and presents Rose to them as their deliverer and vows to make her his wife. Rose leads them to the secret path, while Sylvain returns to the village, leaving Belamy triumphant at his discovery.

=== Act 3 ===
On the following morning the villagers talk of nothing but Sylvain's wedding with Rose and the hermit's bell ringing. Nobody knows who was the culprit; Thibaut, having learned that the soldiers had been commanded to saddle their horses in the midst of the dancing the night before, and that Belamy, sure of his prey, has come back, he believes that Rose has betrayed the Camisards in order to win the price set on their heads.

To keep Belamy away from Georgette, the squire has taken him to the wine-cellar, and the officer, now half-drunk, admits to having had a rendez-vous with Rose. When Thibaut has retired, Belamy again kisses Georgette – but the bell does not ring!

Meanwhile Rose comes down the hill, neatly clad and glowing with joy. Georgette, disregarding Thibaut's reproofs, offers her the wedding-garland. The whole village is assembled to see the wedding, but Sylvain appears and when Rose radiantly greets him, he pushes her back fiercely, believing Thibaut's whispers that she betrayed the refugees, who are, as he has heard, caught. Rose is too proud to defend herself, but when Georgette tries to console her, she silently produces a paper proving that the refugees have safely crossed the frontier; Sylvain is ashamed. Suddenly Belamy enters, beside himself with rage, for his prey has escaped and he has lost his rank together with the prize of 200 pistoles. He at once orders Sylvain to be shot, but Rose bravely defends her lover, threatening to reveal the dragoon's neglect of duty at the hermitage. When Belamy's superior appears to hear the news, his corporal is only able to stammer out that nothing in particular has happened, and so after all, Georgette is saved from discovery, and Rose becomes Sylvain's happy bride.

== Recordings ==
- 1948 (in German): Maria Madlen Madsen (Rose Friquet), Hanna Clauss (Georgette), Franz Fehringer (Sylvain), Kurt Gester (Belamy), Willi Hofmann (Thibaut); conducted by Kurt Schröder.
- 1961: Susanne Lafaye (Rose Friquet), Andrée Esposito (Georgette), André Mallabrera (Sylvain), Julien Haas (Belamy), Pierre Héral (Thibaut); conducted by Richard Blareau.
