= Louis Benoît Alphonse Révial =

19th-century French tenor

Alphonse Révial, real name Marie Pauline Françoise Louis Benoît Alphonse Révial (29 May 1810 – 13 October 1871) was a French tenor and singing professor.

== Biography ==
Born in Toulouse, Révial entered the Conservatoire de Paris on 23 October 1829. He obtained the second prize in singing at the 1831 competition, the first prize in 1832.

On 15 April 1833, he made his debut at the Opéra-Comique in Daniel-François-Esprit Auber's Fra Diavolo. The first role he created was in the Prison d'Édimbourg, by Michele Enrico Carafa, on 20 July 1833. For a few years he was the first tenor of Opéra-Comique; On 23 March 1835, he premiered the role of Prince Yang in Aubert's Le cheval de bronze; on 23 January 1836, the role of count Léoni in Auber's Actéon.

After the debut of Gustave-Hippolyte Roger, Révial could not stay; he retired in April 1838, and left for Italy, where he worked to perfect his organ and his vocalization mechanism. In 1840 he sang in the theatre of Varese, as the first tenor. Returning to Paris at the beginning of 1841, he appeared in concerts in a few cities in France and London, then he was hired as the first tenor of the Hague Theatre in 1842.

Returning to Paris in 1843, he renounced the stage and successfully began teaching. In July 1846, he was appointed singing teacher at the Conservatoire de Paris. He remained so until 1868. Among his main students were MM. Merly, Marc Bonnehée, Wicart, Moreri, Victor Capoul, Pedro Gailhard, Renard, Mrs Marie Cico, Brunet-Lafleur (Note: Marie-Hélène Brunet, called Mme Brunet-Lafleur, wife of composer Armand Roux, then of Charles Lamoureux in second weddings,)Caroline Girard, Dérasse, and Juliette Borghèse.

Révial died in Étretat on 13 October 1871 at age 61.

== Sources ==
- Burat de Gurgy, Edmond (1837). Biographie des acteurs de Paris. Chez les éditeurs. p. 177.
