= Gaetano Crivelli =

Italian opera singer

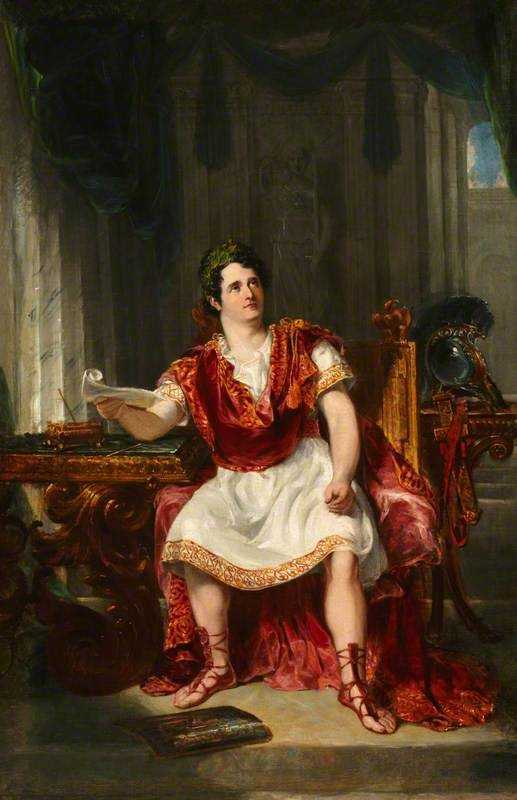
Portrait of Crivelli in Roman costume by John Partridge c. 1825

Gaetano Crivelli (20 October 1768 – 16 July 1836) was a celebrated Italian tenor.

Although he was born not actually in Bergamo but in neighbouring Brescia, Crivelli can be regarded as one of the founders of that remarkable Bergamo tenor school which, beginning with Giacomo David and proceeding through such singers as Giovanni David, Andrea Nozzari, Domenico Donzelli and Marco Bordogni, culminated in the great Giovanni Battista Rubini.

Crivelli, a baritonal tenor in the eighteenth century’s Italian manner, made his first public appearance rather late, aged 28, in his native town. He sang in several other Italian theatres before his début at Milan’s La Scala in 1805, in the premiere of Mayr's opera Eraldo ed Emma. He appeared in the Italian premiere of Mozart's La clemenza di Tito at Naples's Teatro di San Carlo, in 1809. Crivelli then moved to Paris, where, at the Théâtre des Italiens in 1811, he performed what was probably his best-suited opera, Pirro by Paisiello: he afterwards performed it with lesser success in London. Despite this lack of success he gave England an important legacy in the form of his son Domenico, who settled permanently there, first as a singer and later as a singing teacher, a prominent figure in English musical life of that period.

Having returned to Italy, Gaetano pursued his career for several years mainly in the northern theatres, as for example at La Scala, where he sang in La clemenza di Tito at its 1818 revival, or at Venice’s La Fenice, where he played opposite Giuditta Pasta in the first performance of Giuseppe Nicolini’s La conquista di Granata; in 1821, opposite the prima-donna Francesca Maffei Festa, in the première of Saverio Mercadante’s opera Andronico; and in 1824 in the first performance of Meyerbeer's Il crociato in Egitto, the last major opera with a role for a castrato (played then by Giovanni Battista Velluti).

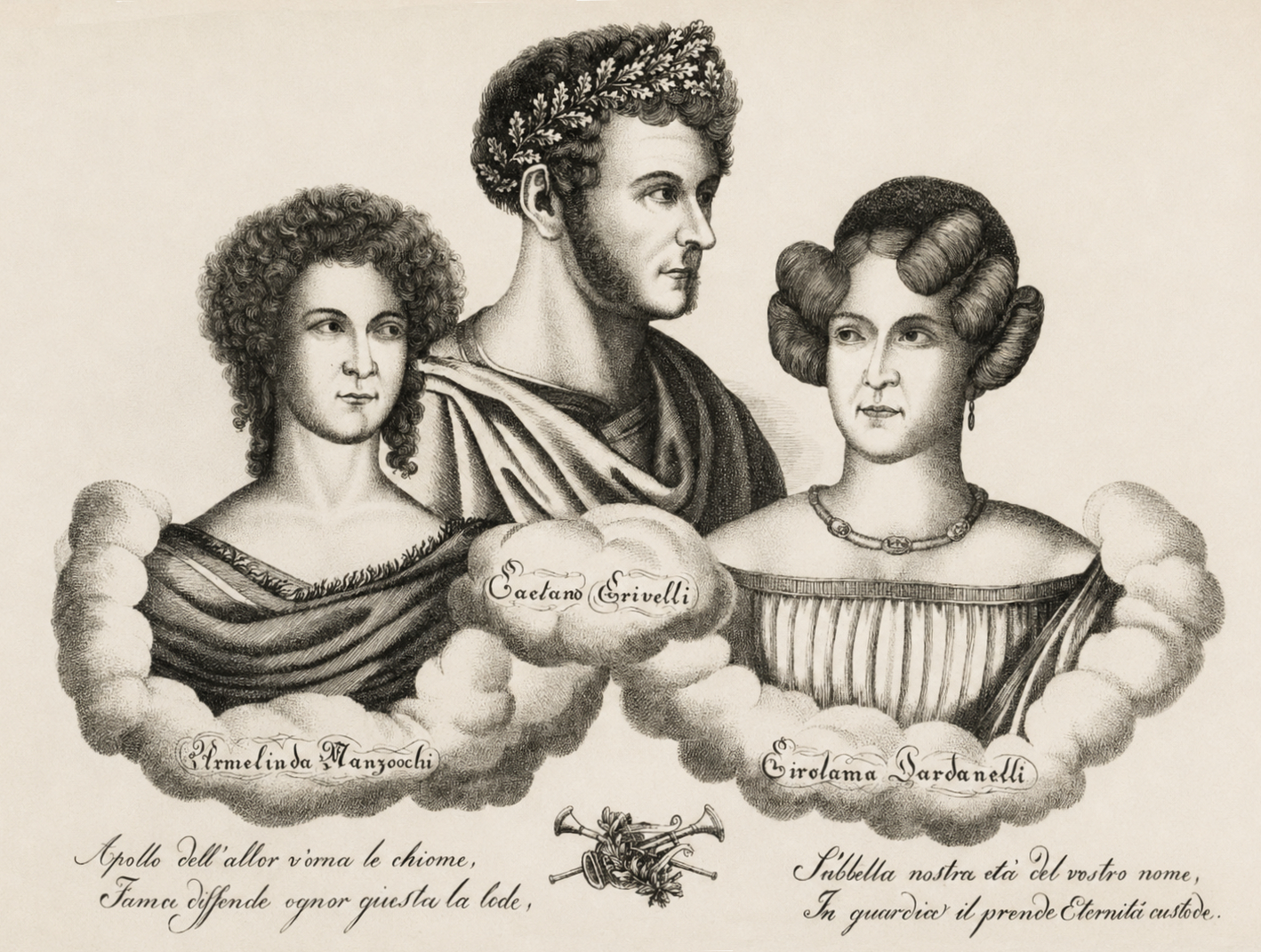
Gaetano Crivelli, Girolama Dardanelli and Almerinda Manzocchi

In his long career, Crivelli was known for his bari-tenor vocal qualities and performed with a style characterized by quivering accents, passionate delivery, and expressive vocal emphasis rather than florid virtuosity. He contributed to the early 19th-century bel canto revival, which preceded the period during which Rossini composed many of his works. He was not considered a leading figure within that revival, and contemporary accounts attribute this in part to the absence of an acrobatic virtuoso technique.

Crivelli died of cholera in Brescia at the age of 67. Three of his sons were also musicians. Domenico Crivelli (1793–1852) was a composer and singing teacher. Enrico Crivelli (1820-1870) sang leading baritone roles in the opera houses of Italy and Europe. Giovanni Crivelli (1801–1833) was also a baritone opera singer who died in London at the age of 32.
