= Domenico Donzelli =

Italian opera singer (1790–1873)

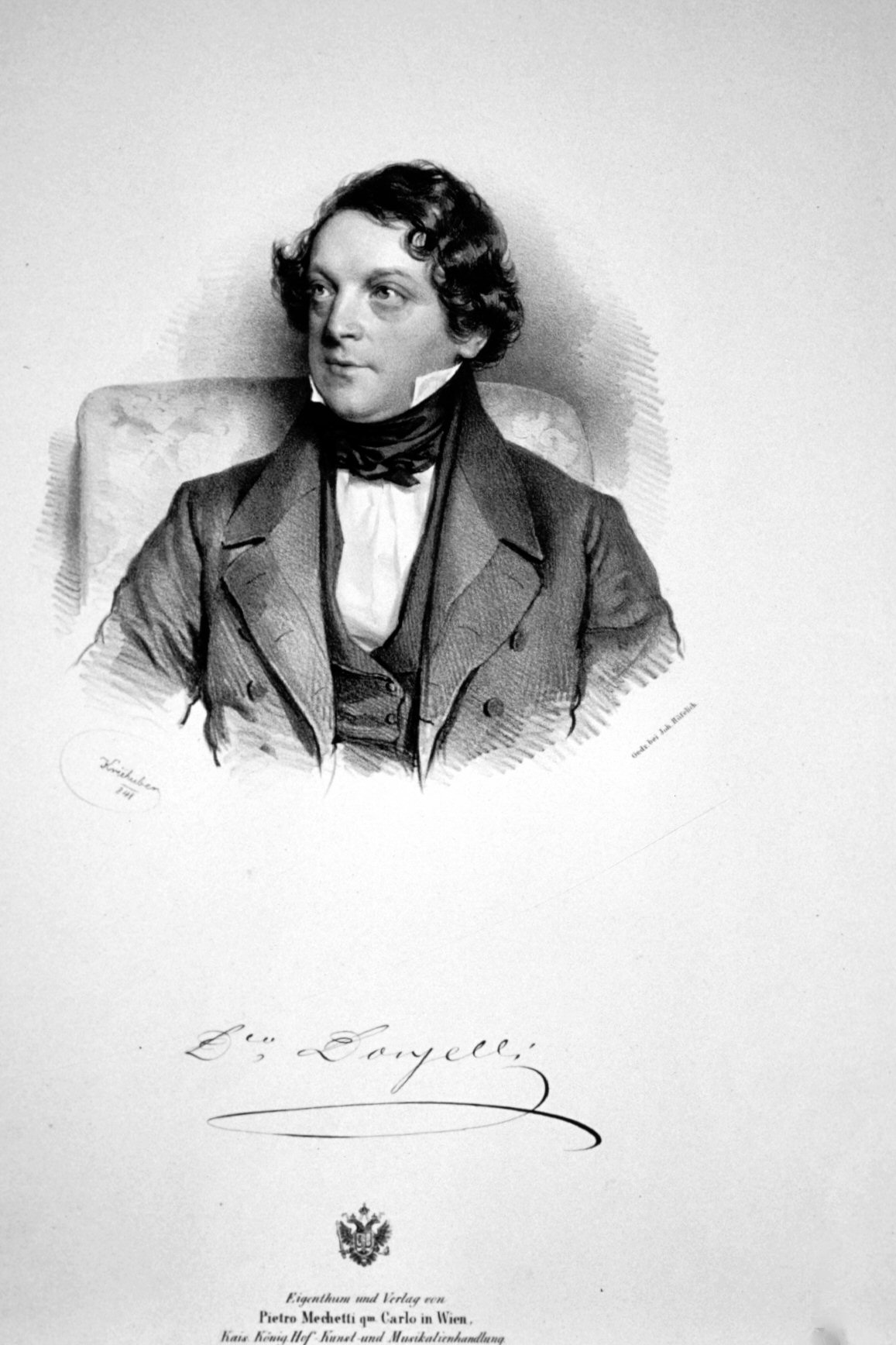
Domenico Donzelli, Lithograph by Josef Kriehuber, 1841

Domenico Donzelli (2 February 1790 – 31 March 1873) was an Italian tenor with a robust voice who enjoyed an important career in Paris, London and his native country during the 1808-1841 period.

== Biography ==
Donzelli can be regarded as an offshoot of the so-called Bergamo tenor school which had originated with Giacomo David and Gaetano Crivelli, and which also included Giovanni David, Andrea Nozzari, Marco Bordogni, and Giovanni Battista Rubini.

Donzelli made his debut in his home town, in 1808, as a second tenor in an opera by Johann Simon Mayr. He soon moved to Naples and performed many roles there, including that of Cinna in a revival of Gaspare Spontini's La Vestale. He became well known in 1815 when Rossini wrote for him the role of Torvaldo in Torvaldo e Dorliska, and when, the following year, he made his first appearance at the Teatro alla Scala as the protagonist of Ferdinando Paër's Achille.

His career made subsequent headway in major Italian theatres, in Paris, and in London, gaining fame for many of his Rossini roles, especially Otello. His performances ranged from the protagonist of Pacini's Cesare in Egitto (1821), to the role of Cavalier Belfiore in Rossini's Il viaggio a Reims (1825), from the first Pollione in Bellini's Norma (1831) to the chief part in Mercadante's Il bravo (1839). He appeared also in several premières of Donizetti operas, for instance, as Almuzir in Zoraide di Granata (1822), Ugo, conte di Parigi in the opera of that name (1832), and Don Ruiz in Maria Padilla (1841).

Donzelli retired from the stage in 1841. He returned briefly in 1844/45 to sing in Naples, but his voice had irreparably deteriorated. He died in Bologna in 1873, at the age of 83.

== Artistic features ==
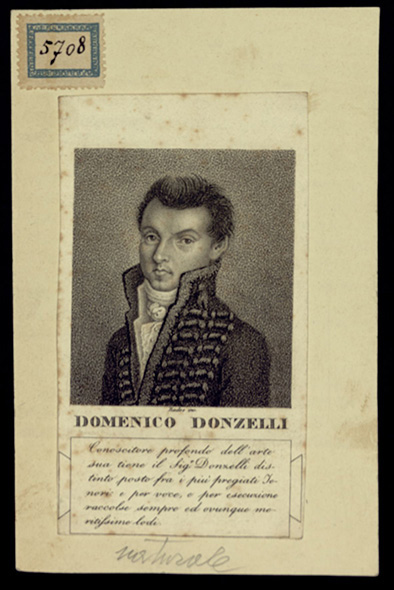
Portrait of Domenico Donzelli, tenor (1790-1873), before 1840.

In Donzelli's artistic career, it is possible to discern three separate periods. In the first he was mainly a comic opera tenorino; the second, more substantial period (enduring until about 1822), was spent as a singer of the Rossini stamp; the third, and most significant, was spent as a "tenore di forza" (a category of dramatic tenor). Donzelli was in fact an old-fashioned baritenor in the traditional Italian manner, with a fairly narrow vocal range. In the central period of his career he could sing up to high C, but only in "falsettone"—a sort of head voice, but much more forceful and expressive than the proper falsetto.

Little versed in coloratura, but decidedly powerful of voice, he had a dark timbre, a firm accent, great phrasing and passionate acting. Despite criticisms of his voice's strenuousness and lack of agility, Donzelli can be held to represent the junction between the old neoclassic style of baritenor and the romantic "forceful tenor". He was the model for the real founder of the latter category of singers, Gilbert Louis Duprez, who was to become famous as the first practitioner of the high C from the chest.

Stories are told that an attempt to emulate Donzelli's robust singing style might have been the cause of the demise of a young colleague of his, Americo Sbigoli, who had been engaged, together with Donzelli, in 1821, to execute the première of Donizetti's Zoraide di Granata at Rome's Teatro Argentina. In trying to match Donzelli's performance during rehearsals, Sbigoli reputedly burst a blood vessel in his throat and thereupon died.

== Sources ==
- Appolonia, Giorgio, Il tenore rossiniano, LEMMA PRESS, Bergamo 2018, pp. 105–119
- Appolonia, Giorgio, Le voci di Rossini, EDA, Torino 1992, pp. 225–241
- Caruselli, Salvatore (ed.), Grande enciclopedia della musica lirica, Longanesi &C. Periodici S.p.A., Roma, ad nomen
- Warrack, John and West, Ewan (1992), The Oxford Dictionary of Opera, 782 pages, ISBN 0-19-869164-5
- This article is a substantial translation from Domenico Donzelli in the Italian Wikipedia.
