= Teatro Comunale (Ferrara) =

Opera house in Emilia-Romagna

Coordinates: 44°50′15″N 11°37′13″E

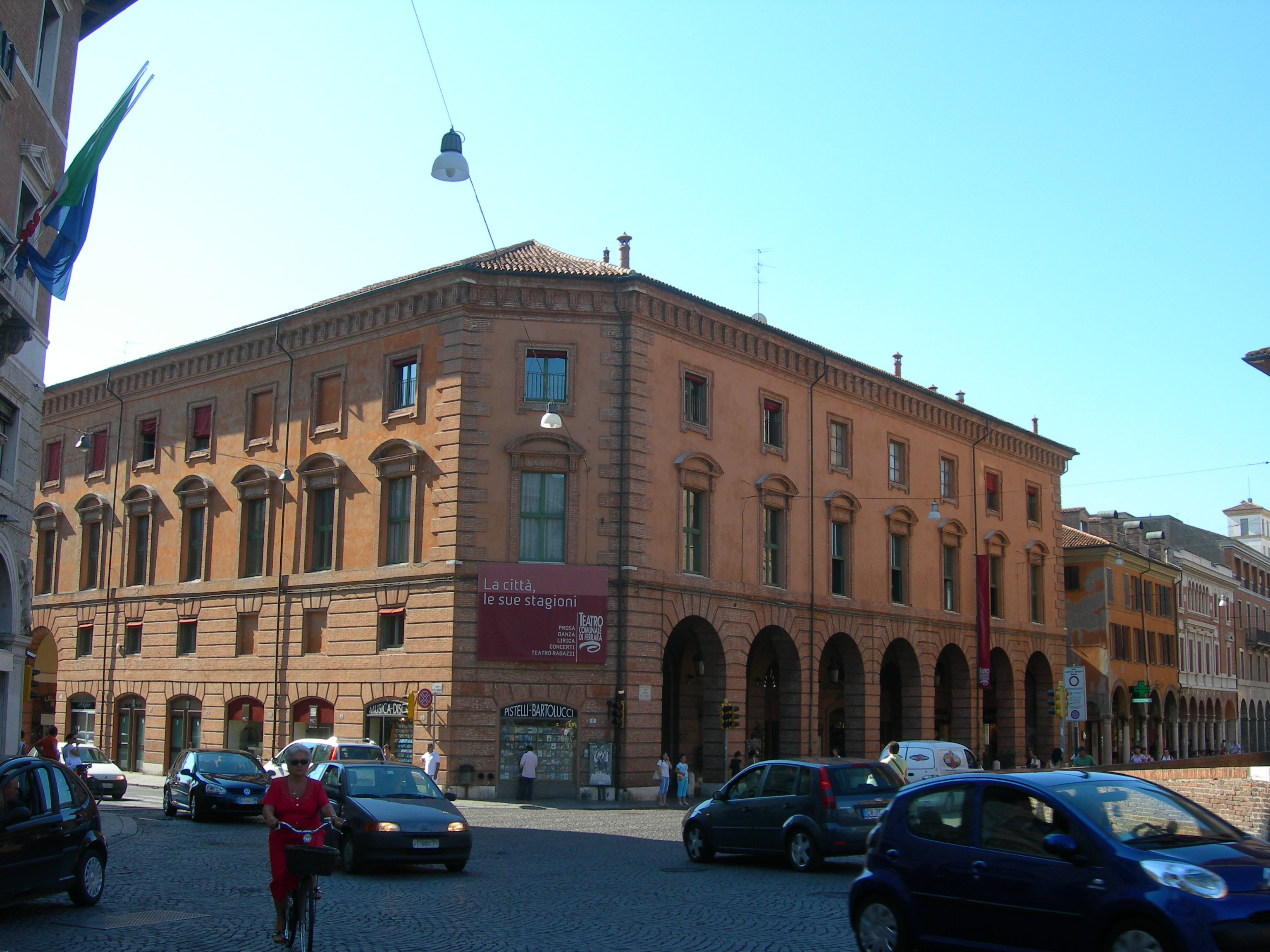
Teatro Comunale in Ferrara.

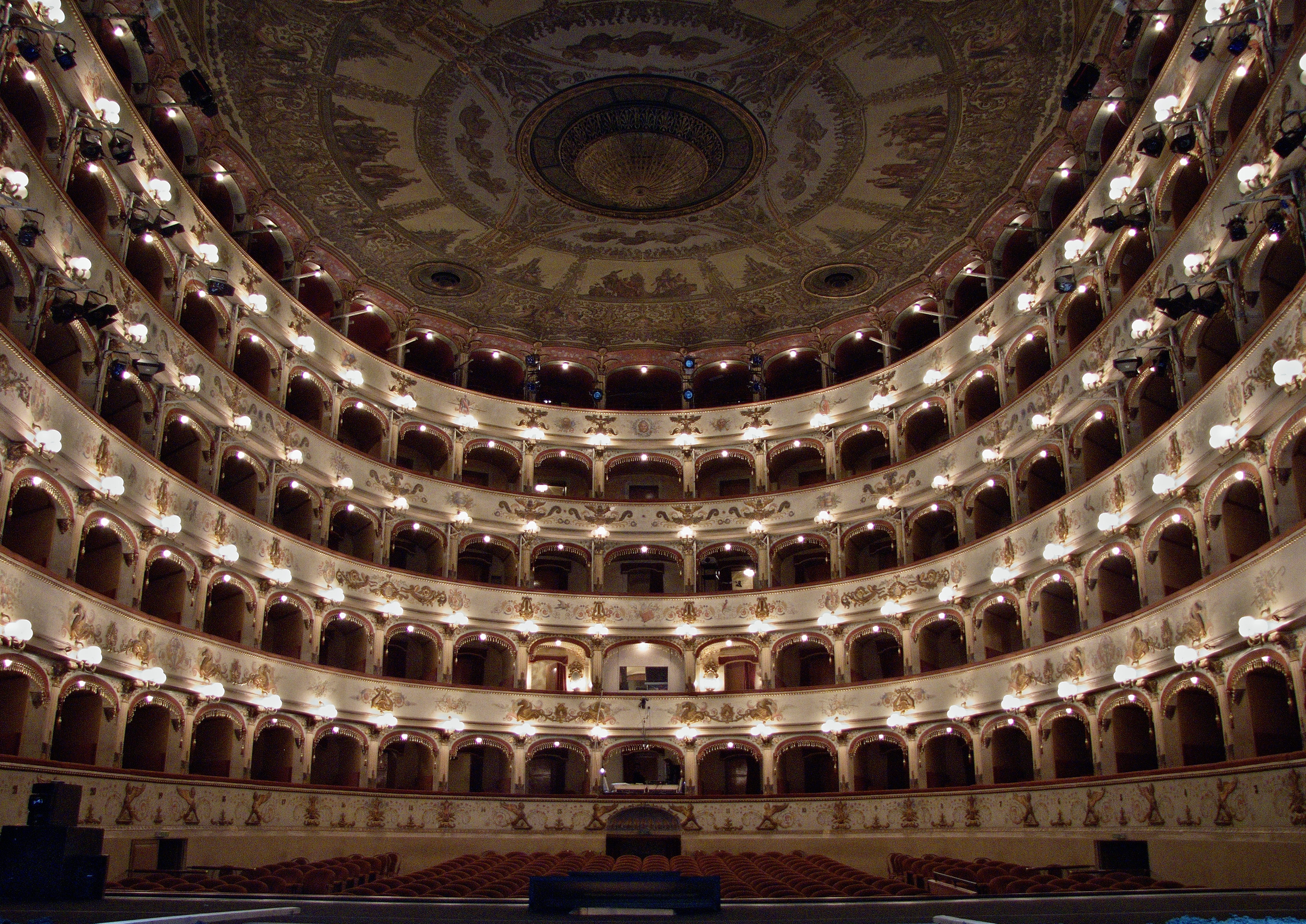
Teatro Comunale, Auditorium

The Teatro Comunale (Communal Theatre) in Ferrara is an opera house, located in the Italian region of Emilia-Romagna, and built between 1786 and 1797 with seating for 990. Privately owned theatres with limited seating capacity had existed in the city for many years, but the arrival of Cardinal Spinelli, the new papal envoy, in 1786 spurred the construction of a new public theatre under the architects Cosimo Morelli and Antonio Foschini. However, their disagreements led to conflicting design concepts regarding the elliptical shape of the auditorium which were resolved through compromise. The theatre was finally ready for its inaugural presentation of Portogallo's Gli Orazi e i Curiazi on 2 September 1798.

The theatre is noted for staging the premiere of an early opera written by Gioacchino Rossini at the age of twenty, Ciro in Babilonia in March 1812.

Between 1825 and 1826 some renovation work was required, followed by some more in 1850, creating the theatre as seen today. In 1928 an orchestra pit was added. During the Second World War the theatre suffered badly from Allied bombing and, although it opened occasionally in the immediate post-war years, it closed in 1956, not to re-open until further restoration took place in the early 1960s and then once again between 1987 and 1989.

The present-day auditorium has 5 tiers, while the ceiling displays four scenes from the life of Julius Caesar. It now seats 890.

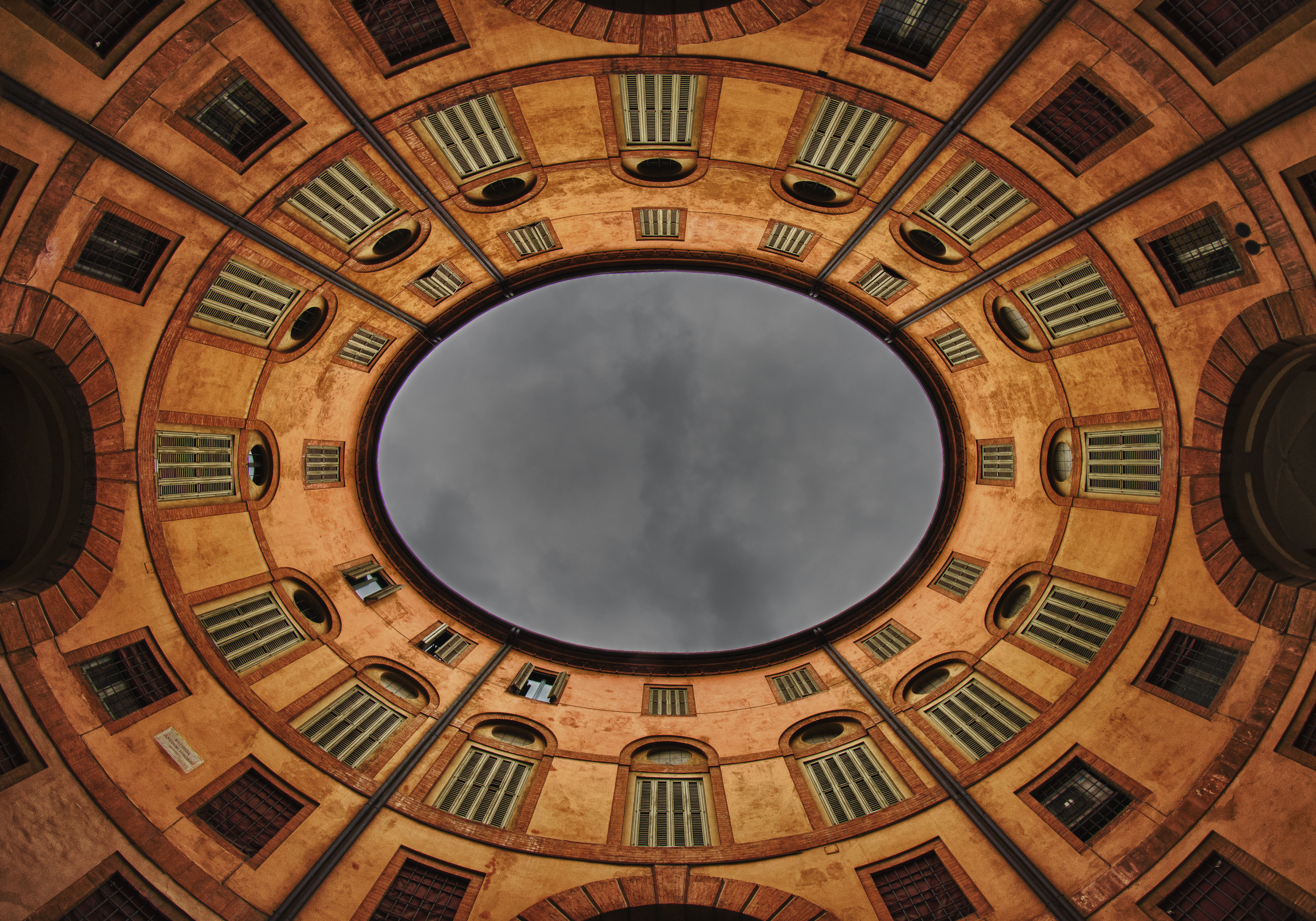
Rotonda Foschini, the internal court of the Teatro Comunale.

Following the Second World War and subsequent renovations, performances were fairly sporadic, but after the creation of “Ferrara Musica” in 1988, more operatic performances have been staged, some of obscure or little-known operas, and other, more popular works alongside other theatres in the Emilia-Romagna region. The conductor Claudio Abbado usually presented one opera every season and the 2007 schedule showed four operas being staged between February and April, along with dance, theatre and other events of various kinds.

Between January and April 2008 the four operas performed were Motezuma by Vivaldi, Maria de Buenos Aires by Astor Piazolla, Tosca by Puccini and Lucia di Lammermoor by Donizetti. The theatre's 2013/14 season shows performances of four operas.

== See also ==
- List of opera houses
