= Carolina Crespi =

Italian opera singer

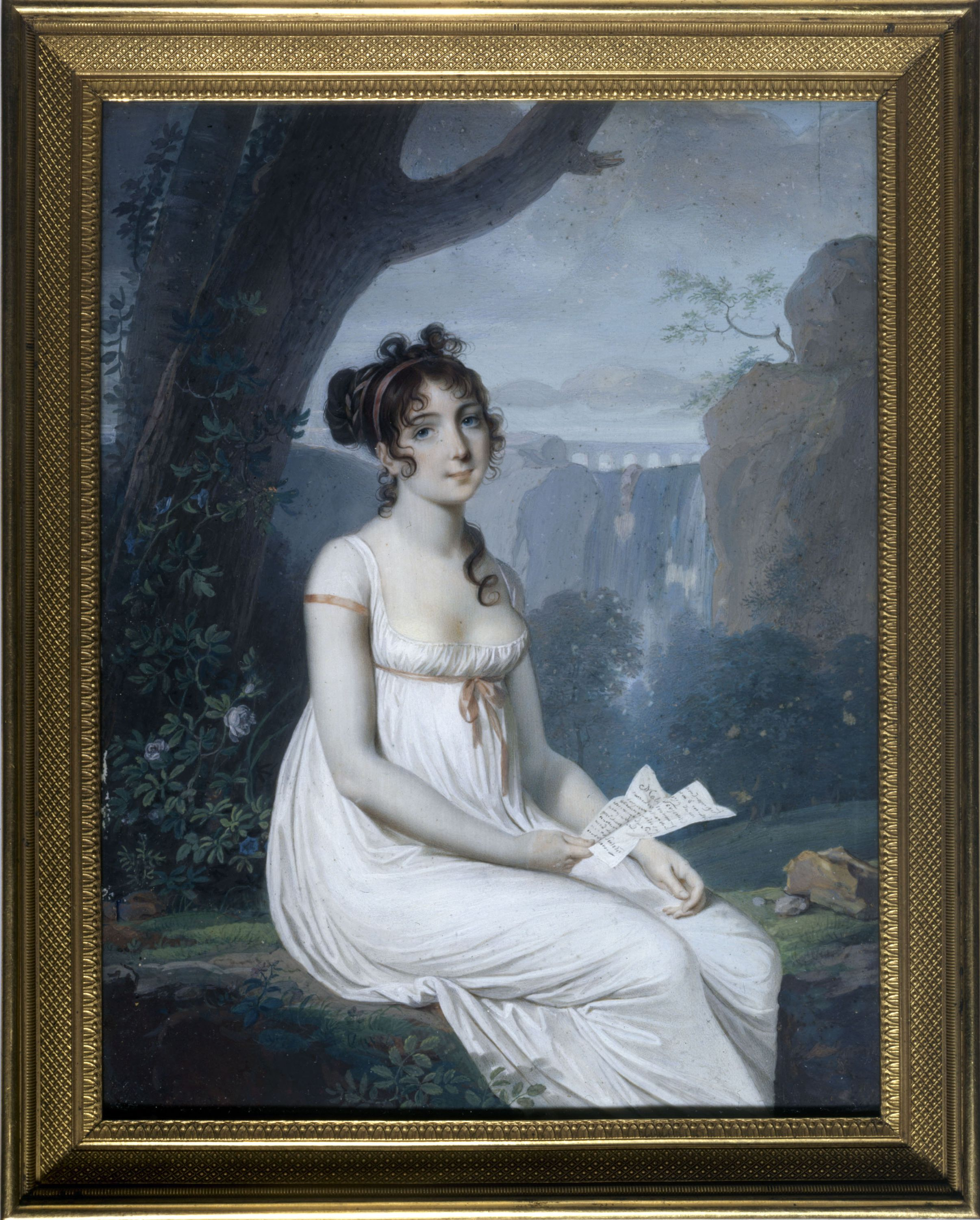
- Born: c. 1790; Prague
- Died: after 1842
- Other names: Carolina Crespi-Bianchi; Carolina Bianchi
- Occupation: Opera singer (soprano)
- Spouse: Eliodoro Bianchi

Carolina Crespi (c. 1790 – after 1842), later known as Carolina Crespi-Bianchi and Carolina Bianchi, was an Italian soprano active on the opera stages of Paris and Northern Italy from 1803 to 1820. She was born in Prague, the daughter of the soprano Luigia Prosperi-Crespi (1770–1824). Crespi was married to the tenor Eliodoro Bianchi and appeared with him in three world premieres at La Scala.

== Life and career ==
Crespi was born in Prague, where her mother, Luigia Prosperi-Crespi, was singing with Domenico Guardasoni's opera troupe. In her childhood, she travelled around Europe with her mother, a prominent Italian soprano who sang in some of the earliest performances of Mozart's Don Giovanni. She first appeared on the stage in Barcelona in 1800, singing the child role of Elamir in Salieri's Axur, re d'Ormus with her mother singing the role of Atar. She began appearing in adult roles in Italy in 1803 at the Teatro d'Angennes in Turin and in 1804 with her mother at the Teatro de' Quattro Compadroni in Pavia.

From 1805 to 1808 both Crespi and her mother were performing at the Théâtre-Italien in Paris, where her roles included Carolina in Il matrimonio segreto, Susanna in Le nozze di Figaro, and Eurilla in L'Erede di Belprato. During this time, she met the tenor Eliodoro Bianchi who was also performing at the theatre. They married in early 1807, after which she performed as Carolina Crespi-Bianchi. The couple settled in Italy and in 1809 began performing together at La Scala, where they sang in a number of world premieres. They appeared together in several other opera houses in Northern Italy, including the Teatro Grande in Brescia in 1812 in Caruso's Gli amanti alla prova and the Teatro della Canobbiana in Milan in 1810 in Cimarosa's Le trame deluse and again in 1813 in his I traci amanti.

Fétis described Crespi as a "prima donna whose beauty was superior to her talent". It was not a view shared by the critic for the Gazzetta di Genova who saw her perform in 1810 at Genoa's Teatro Sant'Agostino in Fioravanti's Furbo contro il furbo. He wrote: "the lovely bearing of this new actress, her beauty, her clear, sonorous, agile voice, and her comic acting devoid of triviality created a most grateful surprise for the audience." A similar assessment was made by the Gazzetta Piemontese in a review of Crespi's performance as Zerlina in Don Giovanni at the Teatro Carignano in 1815.

Carolina Crespi and Eliodoro Bianchi had two children, Giuseppina and Angelo, both of whom later became singers. However, the marriage proved to be an unhappy one. The couple eventually separated, and Crespi went to live with her mother, who had settled in Milan. Crespi's later appearances without her husband included the Teatro Regio in Turin from 1815 to 1818, the Teatro di Cittadella in Reggio Emilia in 1815, the Teatro Re in Milan in 1817, and the Teatro della Concordia in Cremona in 1819.

Little is known of her later years. The musicologist Alan Walker identified her as the "Madame Bianchi" who sang in a concert in Warsaw in 1825 in which the 15-year-old Chopin also performed. The critic for the Allgemeine musikalische Zeitung wrote of that performance: "Madame Bianchi was a very good singer; but her voice lacks youthful freshness." Both Gustav Klemm in Die Frauen and Gustav Schilling in the earlier Universal-Lexicon der Tonkunst wrote that in 1842 she was living in Milan, long-retired from the stage but still a beautiful woman.

== Roles created ==
Roles sung by Carolina Crespi in world premieres include:

- Ernestina in Carlo Bigatti's L'amante prigioniero; Milan, Teatro alla Scala, 6 May 1809
- Clarice in Ercole Paganini's Le rivali generose; Milan, Teatro alla Scala, 10 June 1809
- Donna Erminia in Pietro Carlo Guglielmi's La presunzione corretta; Milan, Teatro alla Scala, 19 April 1813
- Donna Tea in Giovanni Pacini's Piglia il mondo come viene; Milan, Teatro Re, 28 May 1817
- Semira in Raffaele Russo's La difesa di Goa; Turin, Teatro Regio, 17 January 1818
