= Cividate al Piano =

- Comune
- Comune di Cividate al Piano
- Church

- Coat of arms

- Location within Italy Location within Lombardy
- Coordinates: 45°33′N 9°49′E
- Country: Italy
- Region: Lombardy
- Province: Bergamo (BG)

Government
  - Mayor: Gianni Forlani (Lista Comunita' Democratica)

Area
  - Total: 9 km^{2} (3.5 sq mi)
- Elevation: 147 m (482 ft)

Population (2011)
  - Total: 5,217
  - Density: 580/km^{2} (1,500/sq mi)
- Demonym: Cividatesi
- Time zone: UTC+1 (CET)
  - Summer (DST): UTC+2 (CEST)
- Postal code: 24050
- Dialing code: 0363
- Patron saint: Saint Nicholas of Bari
- Saint day: 6 December
- Website: Official website

Cividate al Piano (Bergamasque: Siedàt or Seedàt) is a town and comune in the province of Bergamo, in Lombardy, Italy.

In 1191 the municipal territory was the seat of the battle of Rudiano between the communes of Bergamo, supported by Cremona, and those of Brescia, supported by Milan.

The Italian tenor Eliodoro Bianchi was born in Cividate al Piano in 1773.
