= Eliodoro Bianchi =

Italian opera singer

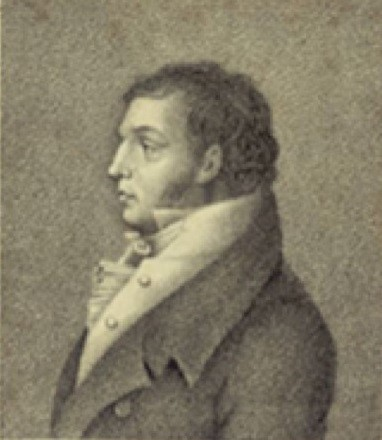
- Born: 6 May 1773; Cividate al Piano, Italy
- Died: 10 May 1848 (aged 75); Palazzolo sull'Oglio, Italy
- Occupations: Opera singer (tenor); Vocal pedagogue
- Spouse: Carolina Crespi

Eliodoro Bianchi (6 May 1773 – 10 May 1848) was an Italian operatic tenor and later a prominent singing teacher. Born in Cividate al Piano and trained in Naples under Giacomo Tritto, he made his stage debut in 1793. Amongst the many roles he created during the course of his 40-year career were Baldassare in Ciro in Babilonia and the King of Sweden in Eduardo e Cristina, both of which were composed by Rossini expressly for Bianchi's voice. He retired from the stage in 1835 and spent his later years in Palazzolo sull'Oglio, where he died at the age of 75.

== Life and career ==
Bianchi was born in Cividate al Piano, a town in the Province of Bergamo, to Claudia née Balestra and Massimo Bianchi. He was the youngest of their nine children. The family moved to Palazzolo sull'Oglio near Brescia in 1775 when Massimo Bianchi was appointed the organist for the town's newly completed cathedral. Bianchi received his early musical training from his father and sang as a boy soprano in local churches. Two of his older brothers also became musicians. Cipriano Bianchi (1765–1835) served as the organist for the Church of Santa Maria Assunta in Calcinate. Odoardo Bianchi was a tenor active in Italian theatres from 1784 to 1791 and later at the Imperial Court in Saint Petersburg.

In his late teens, Bianchi was sent to Naples, where he studied singing and composition with Giacomo Tritto. He was twenty years old when he began his stage career as a tenor, appearing at the Teatro Onigo in Treviso during the autumn season of 1793 as Attalo in Tarchi's Ariarate. Over the next four years, he sang in the theatres of Padua, Genoa, Modena, Florence, Lucca, and Venice. In 1797, he returned to Naples and appeared in various theatres there until 1801. During this time, he sang at the Teatro San Carlo in the premieres of Tritto's Il disinganno, a cantata for three voices and orchestra, and Luigi Capotorti's Enea in Cartagine, a three-act opera seria.

In 1803, he sang for the entire season at La Scala in Milan, where he became a favourite with the audience and returned there regularly from 1809 to 1814. Outside of Italy, he appeared in Paris in 1801 in a series of concerts at the Temple de Mars on Rue du Bac and at the Salle Favart. He sang in Vienna in 1805 and in Paris and London in 1806–1807. In 1807, Bianchi married Carolina Crespi, an eighteen-year-old soprano whom he met when they were both singing with the Théâtre-Italien in Paris. The couple had two children, Giuseppina and Angelo Eliodoro, both of whom became singers. (Note: At the time of Bianchi's death, his son Angelo was the maestro di canto (singing master) at the Accademia Filarmonica in Turin.) However, the marriage proved to be an unhappy one, and they eventually separated.

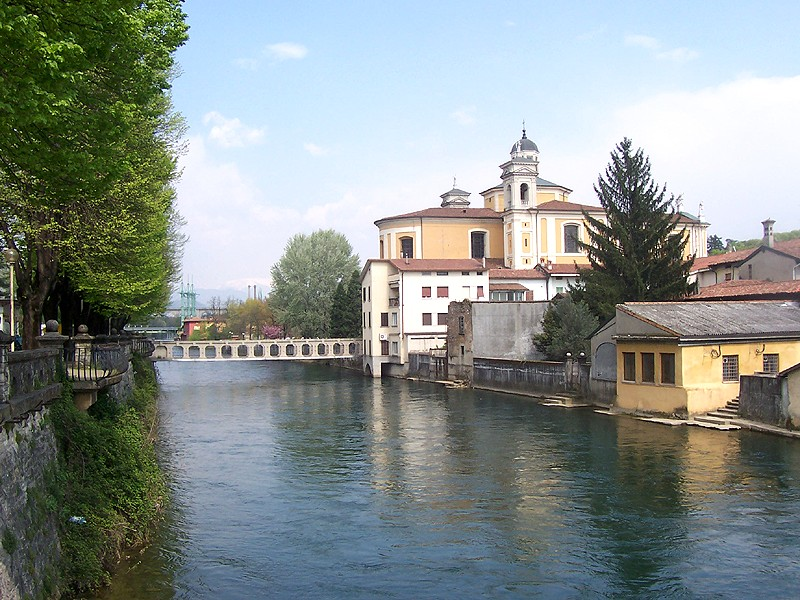
Palazzolo sull'Oglio, where Bianchi spent both his boyhood and retirement years

During the course of his career, Bianchi sang a wide repertoire ranging from opera buffa to opera seria and appeared in numerous world premieres. He began his career primarily singing in opera buffas, but from 1812, he came to prominence in the opera seria genre as well. Rossini composed the roles of Baldassare in Ciro in Babilonia and the King of Sweden in Eduardo e Cristina expressly for Bianchi's voice, and also composed special arias for him to sing when he appeared in Aureliano in Palmira.

According to Rodolfo Celletti, Bianchi's voice was baritonal in quality with a beautiful timbre and employed with an excellent technique and eloquent phrasing. Praise of these traits appeared frequently in contemporary Italian press reviews. However, critics for the French journal Le Moniteur (1806) and the British London Magazine (1820) complained about the baritonal quality of Bianchi's voice, finding his singing "ponderous" and lacking in brilliance.

By 1819, Bianchi had opened a singing school in Milan, although he continued to perform for another 15 years in the opera houses of Italy and occasionally in Austria and England. His students included Elisa Orlandi, Cesare Badiali and Enrico Crivelli. Following the retirement of Antonio Secchi (1761–1833) as professor of singing at the Milan Conservatory in 1832, Bianchi was offered the post, but he turned it down.

Bianchi retired from the stage in 1835. His last performances were in Livorno as Sempronio in Pietro Generali's I baccanali di Roma, one of his signature roles. He spent his later years in Palazzolo sull'Oglio, his boyhood home. He died there in 1848 at the age of 75 and was buried in the town's cemetery.

== Roles created ==
Roles sung by Bianchi in world premieres include:

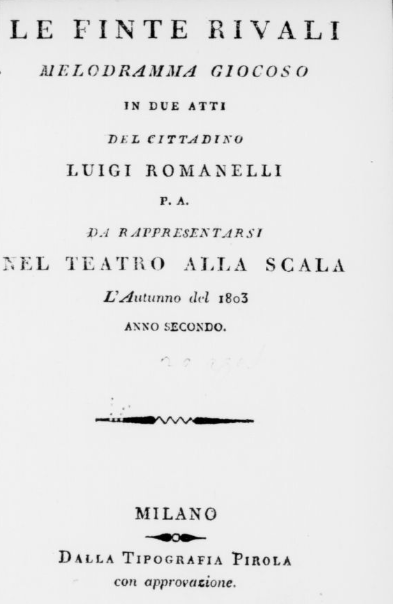
Libretto for Simon Mayr's Le finte rivali printed for the world premiere at La Scala in which Bianchi sang the role of Roberto

- Giacinto in Ferdinando Paer's L'amante servitore; Venice, Teatro San Moisè, 26 December 1796
- Roberto in Francesco Gardi's Amor l'astuzia insegna; Venice, Teatro San Moisè, 18 January 1797
- Florindo in Valentino Fioravanti's L'amor per interesse; Naples, Teatro del Fondo, 15 November 1797
- Sebeto in Giacomo Tritto's Il disinganno; Naples, Teatro San Carlo, 22 July 1799 (Note: Il disinganno was a cantata performed to celebrate the return of Ferdinand IV to Naples and the collapse of the Parthenopaean Republic. It centered on a dialogue between two key figures in the mythology of the city, the river god Sebeto, sung by Eliodoro Bianchi, and the siren Partenope, sung by the castrato Pietro Mattucci.)
- Segesto in Luigi Capotorti's Enea in Cartagine; Naples, Teatro San Carlo, 13 August 1799
- Il Re in Domenico Cimarosa's Cantata per il fausto ritorno di Ferdinando IV, re delle Sicilie; Naples, Chiesa di Santa Maria della Vittoria, 23 September 1799 (Note: Cimarosa's cantata, whose title translates as "Cantata for the Fortunate Return of Ferdinand IV, King of the Sicilies", was the composer's attempt to rehabilitate himself after the fall of the Parthenopaean Republic. He had written two hymns for the republicans, one of which was performed at the burning of the Bourbon flag, and was threatened with a death sentence once the monarchy was restored. In the end, he was spared but imprisoned for a time and then exiled from Ferdinand IV's kingdom.)
- Roberto in Simon Mayr's Le finte rivali; Milan, Teatro alla Scala, 20 August 1803
- Dorante in Niccolò Zingarelli's Il bevitore fortunato; Milan, Teatro alla Scala, 13 November 1803
- Roberto in Carlo Bigatti's L'amante prigioniero; Milan, Teatro alla Scala, 6 May 1809
- Ernesto in Ercole Paganini's Le rivali generose; Milan, Teatro alla Scala, 10 June 1809
- Eraclito in Ercole Paganini's I filosofi al cimento; Milan, Teatro alla Scala, 5 June 1810
- Duca Rambaldo in Giuseppe Farinelli's La contadina bizzarra; Milan, Teatro alla Scala, 16 August 1810
- Baldassare in Gioachino Rossini's Ciro in Babilonia; Ferrara, Teatro Comunale, 14 March 1812
- Cesare di Ferracuto in Pietro Guglielmi's La presunzione corretta; Milan, Teatro alla Scala, 19 April 1813
- Alberto in Giuseppe Mosca's Avviso al pubblico; Milan, Teatro alla Scala, 4 January 1814
- Egeo in Carlo Coccia's Teseo e Medea; Turin, Teatro Regio, 26 December 1815
- Quinto Fabio Massimo in Stefano Pavesi's Le Danaidi romane; Venice, La Fenice, 5 December 1816
- Atride in Francesco Basili's L'ira d'Achille; Venice, La Fenice, 30 January 1817
- Retello in Giacomo Meyerbeer's Romilda e Costanza; Padua, Teatro Nuovo, 19 July 1817
- Carlo di Svezia in Gioachino Rossini's Eduardo e Cristina; Venice, Teatro San Benedetto, 24 April 1819
- Don Gusmano in Stefano Pavesi's Don Gusmano; Venice, Teatro San Benedetto, 1 June 1819
- Norcesto in Giacomo Meyerbeer's Emma di Resburgo; Venice, Teatro San Benedetto, 26 June 1819
- Bayardo in Giovanni Liverati's Gastone e Bayardo; London, King's Theatre, 26 February 1820
- Olinto in Simon Mayr's Demetrio; Turin, Teatro Regio, 27 December 1823
- Sulemano in Giovanni Tadolini's Almanzor; Trieste, Teatro Grande, 22 September 1827

== Compositions ==
Bianchi composed a hymn for four voices and orchestra, "Al ciel sia lode", which was performed before King Ferdinand IV aboard Lord Nelson's ship in the Bay of Naples on 10 July 1799. He also wrote a collection of 12 pieces for singing students, which was dedicated to Rossini and published posthumously in 1863. According to the Dizionario Biografico degli Italiani, some late 19th-century biographies of Bianchi have mistakenly attributed to him two further works by a Milanese composer with the same name: the one-act comic opera Gara d'amore and a reduction of Wagner's Das Liebesmahl der Apostel for voice and piano, both published by Stabilimento Musicale Francesco Lucca in 1873. (Note: The adapted Wagner score was published in an Italian translation by Arrigo Boito, who was six years old at the time of Bianchi's death. The autograph score of the opera Gara d'amore is dated 19 May 1872, 25 years after Bianchi's death.)
