= Aimé Maillart =

French composer (1817–1871)

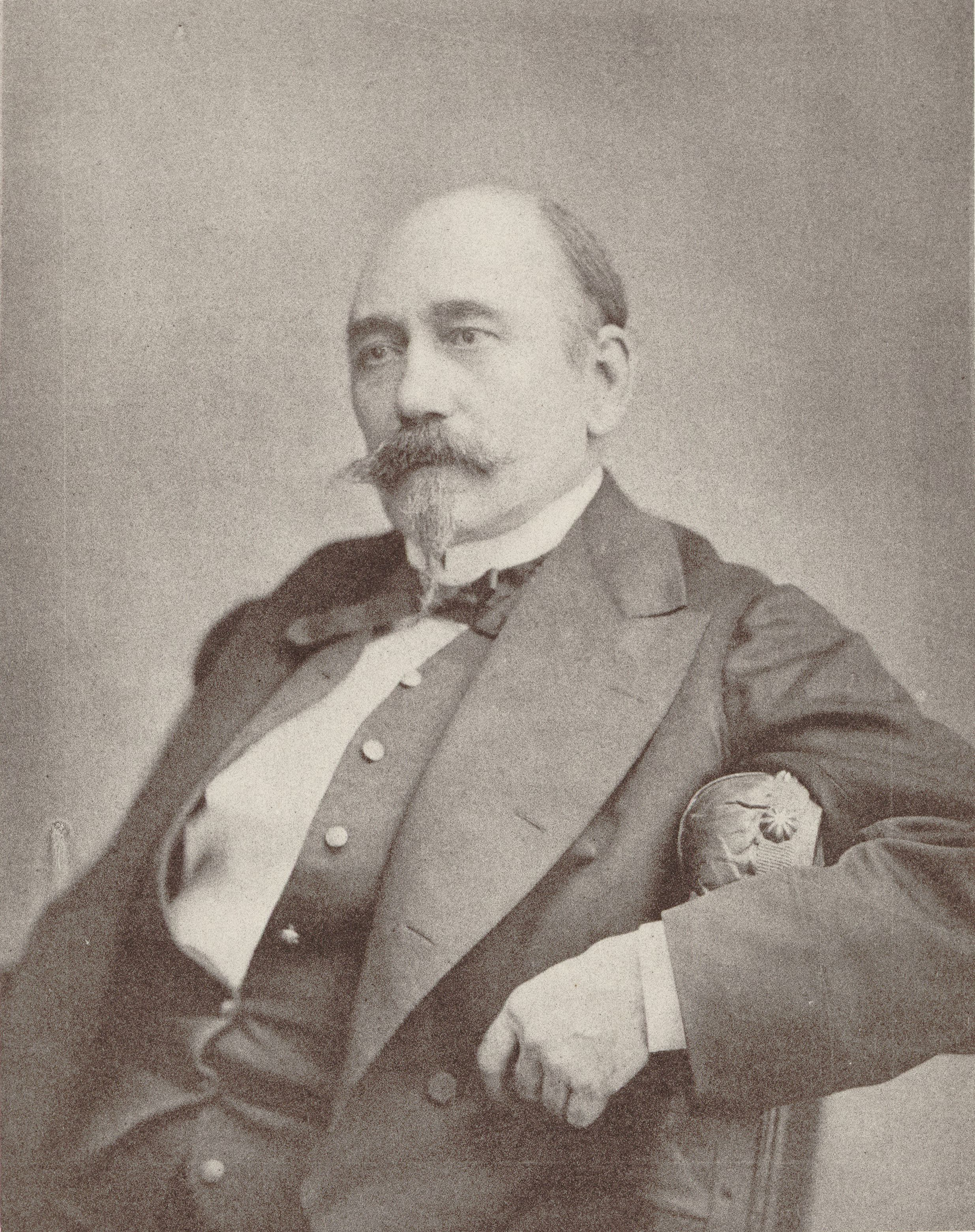
- Born: 24 March 1817; Montpellier, France
- Died: 26 May 1871 (aged 54); Moulins, Allier
- Occupation: Composer

Louis-Aimé Maillart (24 March 1817 – 26 May 1871) was a French composer, best known for his operas, particularly Les Dragons de Villars.

== Biography ==
Maillart was born in Montpellier. He studied at the Conservatoire de Paris from 1833, learning composition from Aimé-Ambroise-Simon Leborne and Fromental Halévy, and violin from Guérin. In 1841 he won France's premier music prize, the Prix de Rome, which brought with it three years' study at the French Academy in Rome. After returning to France he composed his first opera, Gastibelza, ou Le fou de Tolède, which was chosen as the opening work at the Opéra-National (later the Théâtre Lyrique) in 1847. There followed five more operas between then and 1864, all first performed in Paris.

Of his operas, Les dragons de Villars (1856) which premiered at the Théâtre Lyrique is the most prominent; it was also given in Germany under the title Das Glöckchen des Eremiten. It enjoyed several revivals at the Opéra-Comique in Paris up to 1916. Lara was based on a poem of the same name by Lord Byron.

Maiilart died in Moulins, Allier in the Auvergne region of France at the age of 54, and was buried in the Cimetière de Montmartre. Grove's Dictionary of Music and Musicians says of him, "Maillart’s music is characterized by graceful melodies, a colourful, theatrical style and skilful instrumentation".

== Operas ==
- Lionel Foscara (cantata for the Prix de Rome) (1841)
- Gastibelza ou le Fou de Tolède (l'homme à la carbine) opera in three acts (1847)
- Le moulin des tilleuls one-act opera (1849)
- Les dragons de Villars opéra comique (1856)
- Les pêcheurs de Catane poème lyrique (1860)
- Lara (1864)

== References and sources ==
=== Sources ===
- Clément, Félix; Pierre Larousse (1873). Dictionnaire lyrique : ou, Histoire des opéras. Paris: Larousse. OCLC 609871727.
