= Teatro Argentina =

Opera house and theater in Rome, Italy

Coordinates: 41°53′44″N 12°28′34″E

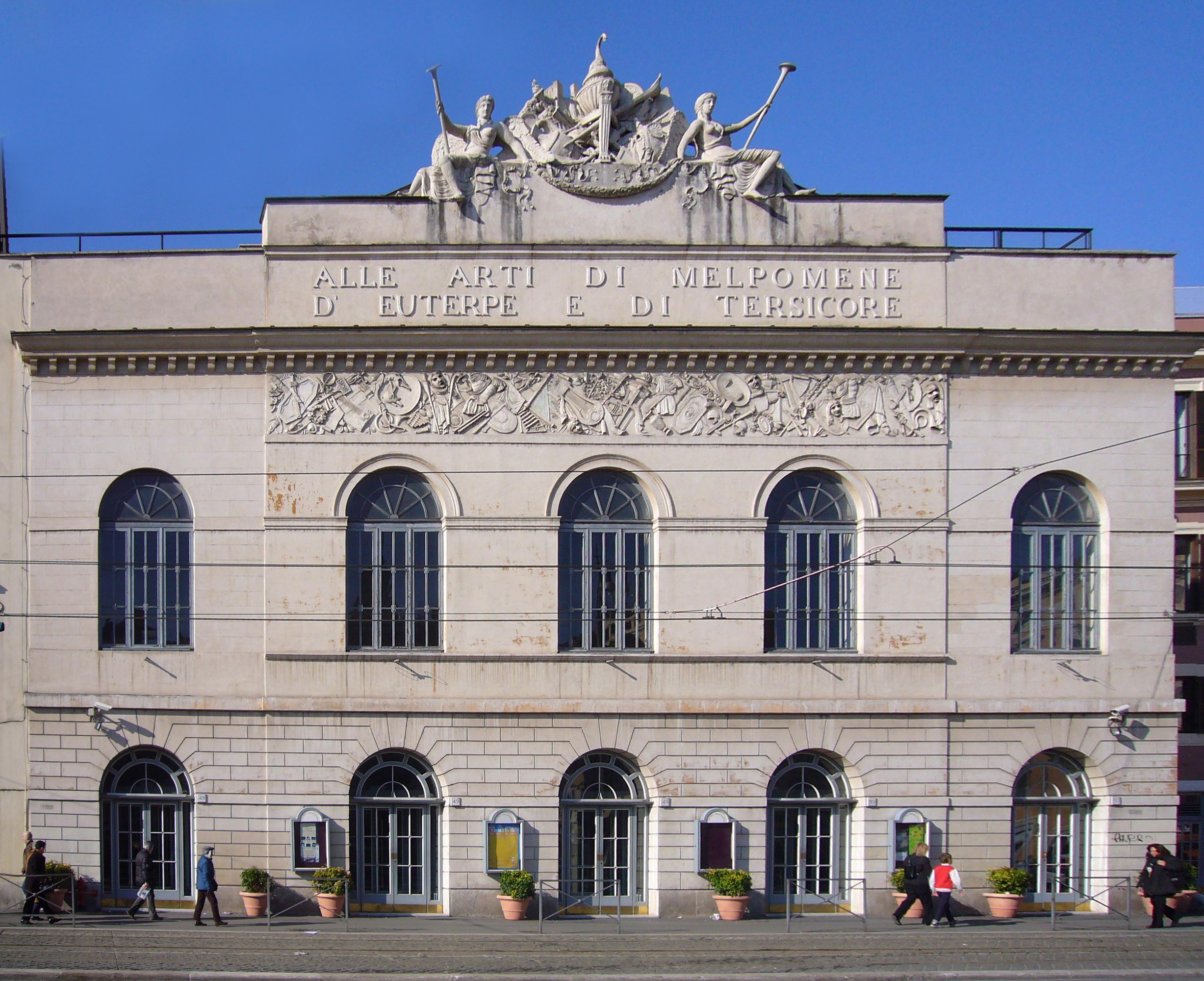
The facade of Teatro Argentina

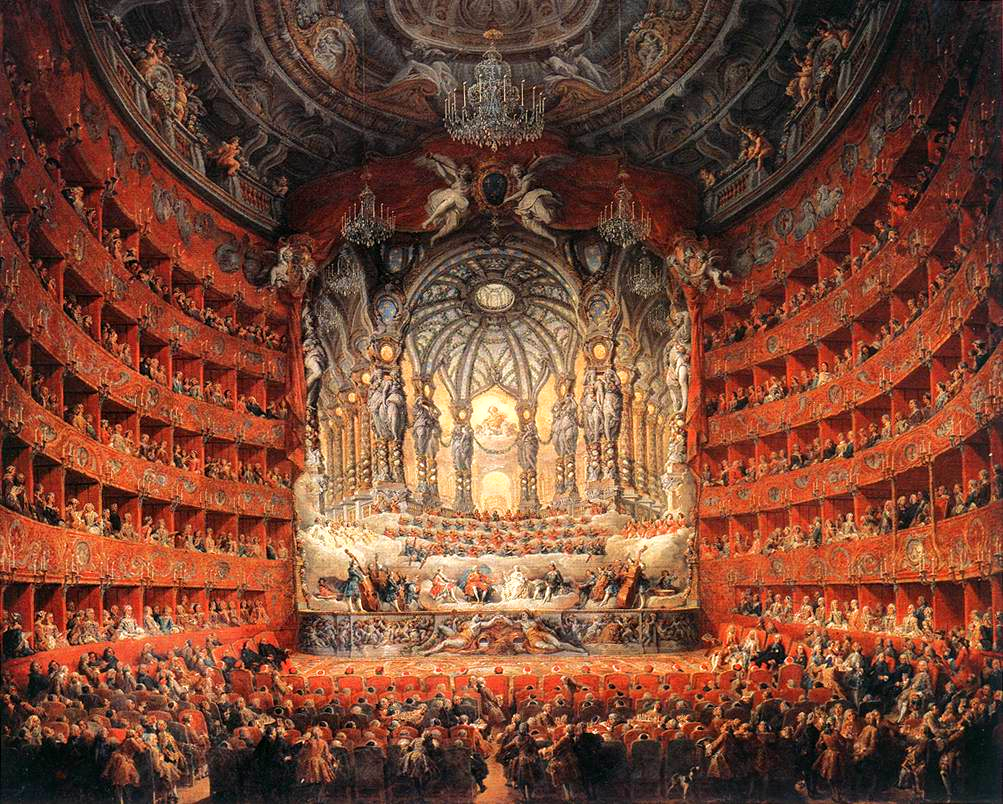
The Teatro Argentina (Panini, 1747, Musée du Louvre)

The Teatro Argentina (directly translating to "Theatre Argentina") is an opera house and theatre located in Largo di Torre Argentina, a square in Rome, Italy. One of the oldest theatres in Rome, it was constructed in 1731 and inaugurated on 31 January 1732 with Berenice by Domenico Sarro. It is built over part of the curia section of the Theatre of Pompey. This curia was the location of the assassination of Julius Caesar.

== History ==
The theatre was commissioned by the Sforza-Cesarini family and designed by the architect Gerolamo Theodoli, with the auditorium laid out in the traditional horseshoe shape. Duke Francesco Sforza-Cesarini, who ran the Argentina Theatre from 1807 to 1815, was a "theatre fanatic" who continued until his death to run up debts. Rossini's The Barber of Seville was given its premiere here on 20 February 1816, just after Duke Francesco's death and, in the 19th century, the premieres of many notable operas took place in the theatre, including Verdi's I due Foscari on 3 November 1844 and La battaglia di Legnano on 27 January 1849, and Teresa Seneke’s Le Due Amiche in 1869.

From 1919 to 1944, more musical offerings than dramatic ones were presented, although the theatre premiered works by Luigi Pirandello, Henrik Ibsen, and Maxim Gorky during this time. A series of operas was presented in the winter of 1944–45 in honor of the American and British troops.

The venue was used for classical music recordings by the Santa Cecilia orchestra in the 1950s.

In 1994, the theatre became the home of the Teatro Stabile company of Rome, currently directed by Mario Martone. It offers a variety of programmes, some being large-scale productions, although more plays than music or opera are presented today.

== Technical information ==
The inside of the theatre is constructed of wood with six levels of boxes characterizing the design, and has been restored many times. It seats 696 people, including 344 in the stalls and with 40 boxes on five levels seating an additional 352.

Plantamura notes that the theatre's acoustics were regarded as being excellent and that the architect who designed the La Fenice opera house in Venice, Gianantonio Selva, modeled his design after the Argentina.

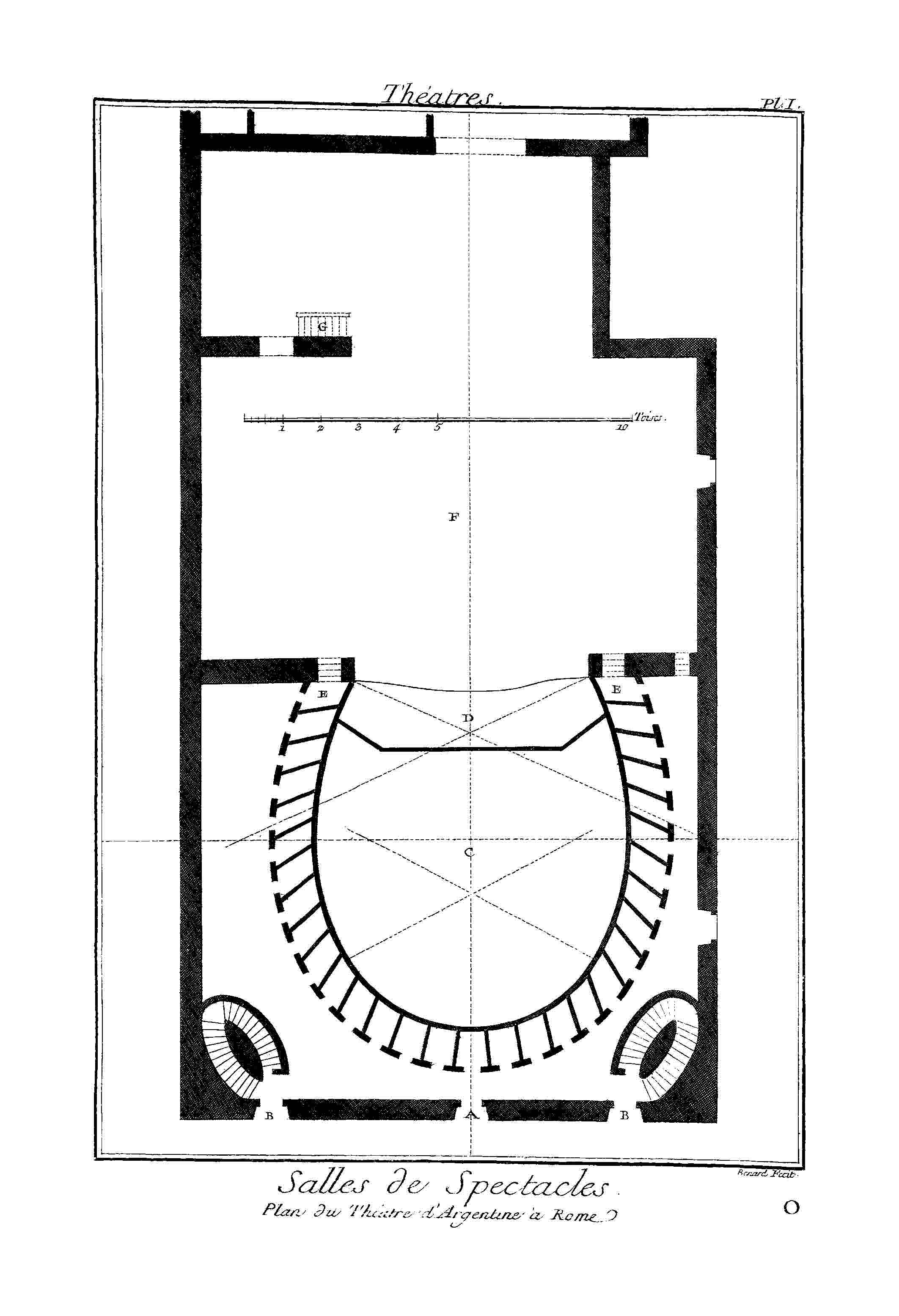
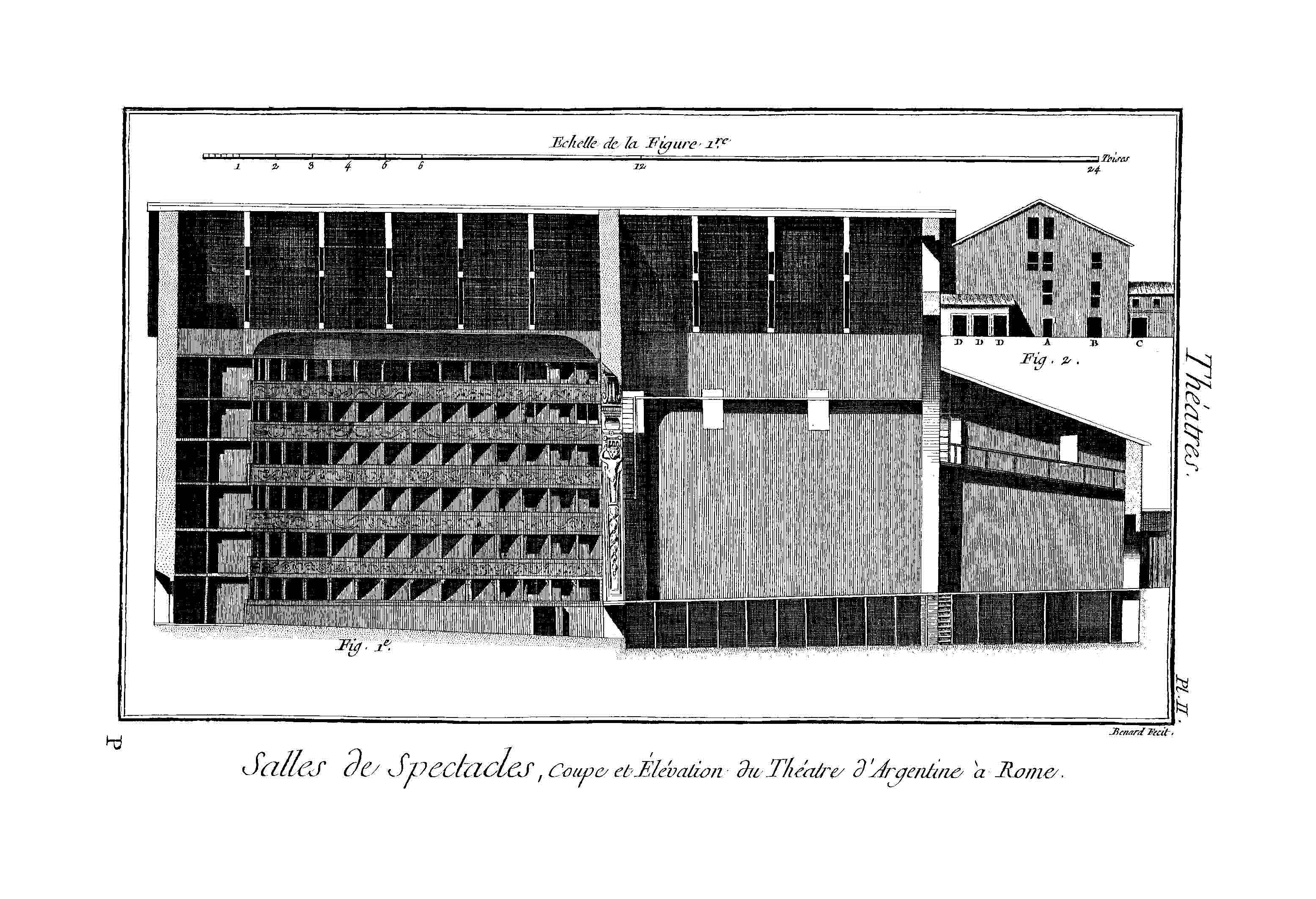
Plan and longitudinal section of the Teatro Argentina (from Diderot's Encyclopédie, 1772)

== In popular culture ==
In the novel The Count of Monte Cristo by Alexandre Dumas, the Teatro Argentina was the setting for an important scene during a performance of Parisina by Gaetano Donizetti.

== See also ==
- List of theatres and opera houses in Rome
