= Ristorante Machiavelli =

Italian restaurant in Edmonds, Washington, U.S.

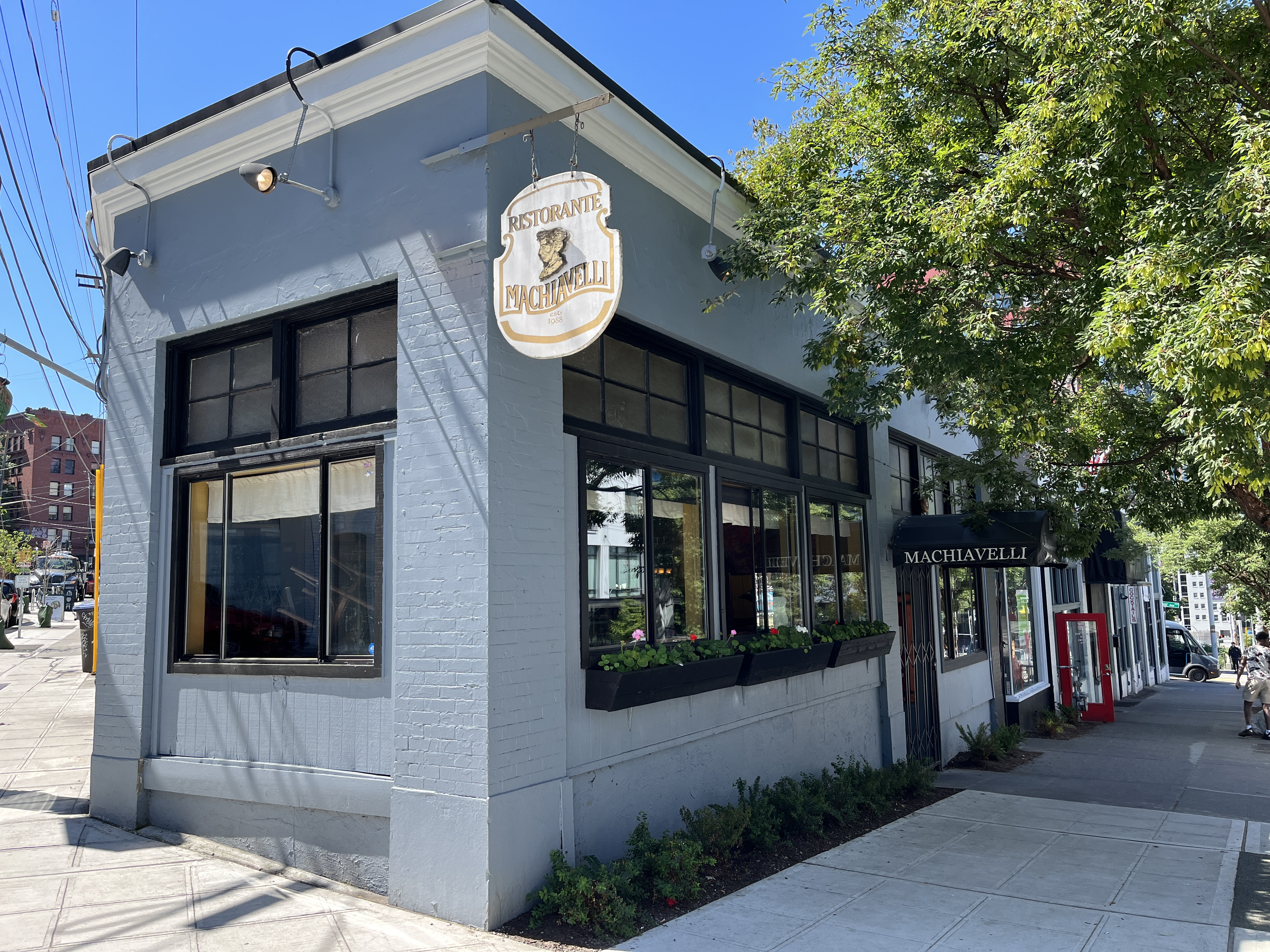
- The exterior of the original restaurant on Seattle's Capitol Hill, 2023
- Interactive map of Ristorante Machiavelli

Restaurant information
- Established: 1988
- Owner: Suzette Jarding
- Previous owners: Tom and Linda McElroy; Javier Arevalo
- Food type: Italian
- Location: 316 Main Street, Edmonds, Snohomish, Washington, 98020, United States
- Coordinates: 47.8110°N 122.3791°W
- Other locations: Capitol Hill, Seattle (1988–2024)
- Website: ristorantemachiavelli.com

Ristorante Machiavelli is an Italian restaurant in Edmonds, Washington, in the United States. The original location operated on Seattle's Capitol Hill from 1988 to 2024. It was housed in the historic Booker Building (1912), and the restaurant had billed itself as "a Capitol Hill tradition since 1988". The Edmonds location, originally an outpost, opened in December 2023.

Ristorante Machiavelli's menu has pizzas, pastas, and other traditional cuisine that has changed little in three decades. It has been regarded as one of Seattle's best Italian restaurants and one of Capitol Hill's best dining options. Ristorante Machiavelli has garnered a positive reception and has been recognized for its gnocchi, veal, and lasagna, in particular.

== Description ==
Ristorante Machiavelli is a Latin American- and woman-owned Italian restaurant in Edmonds, Washington. Previously, the restaurant operated at the intersection of Pine Street and Melrose Avenue on Seattle's Capitol Hill. Along with other businesses, the restaurant was housed in the Booker Building (also known as the Central Auto Top Building), a historic commercial building completed in 1912. Aimee Rizzo of The Infatuation described the Capitol Hill location as a "wonderfully small, dimly-lit space with friendly servers roaming around carrying metal tins of grated parmesan and wooden pepper grinders, ready to sprinkle and grind". Noms Magazine has described the restaurant as a "cute corner neighborhood" establishment with a small bar and a dining room "with a cozy and lively vibe".

=== Menu ===
The menu has included pizzas, pastas, and il diplomatico (ladyfingers dipped in espresso and rum, layered with chocolate mousse and whipped cream). One lasagna variety has included spinach noodles and chicken livers. The lasagna bolognese has layers of mozzarella, fontina, and parmesan. Pasta options have included: spaghetti and meatballs; penne with roasted red pepper, walnuts, and cream; linguine carbonara; and spinach ravioli with ricotta and mushrooms in a tomato cream sauce. The restaurant has also served ahi carpaccio, eggplant Parmesan, gnocchi, shrimp, and bread supplied by Columbia City Bakery. The dessert menu has included tiramisu and New York-style cheesecake.

== History ==
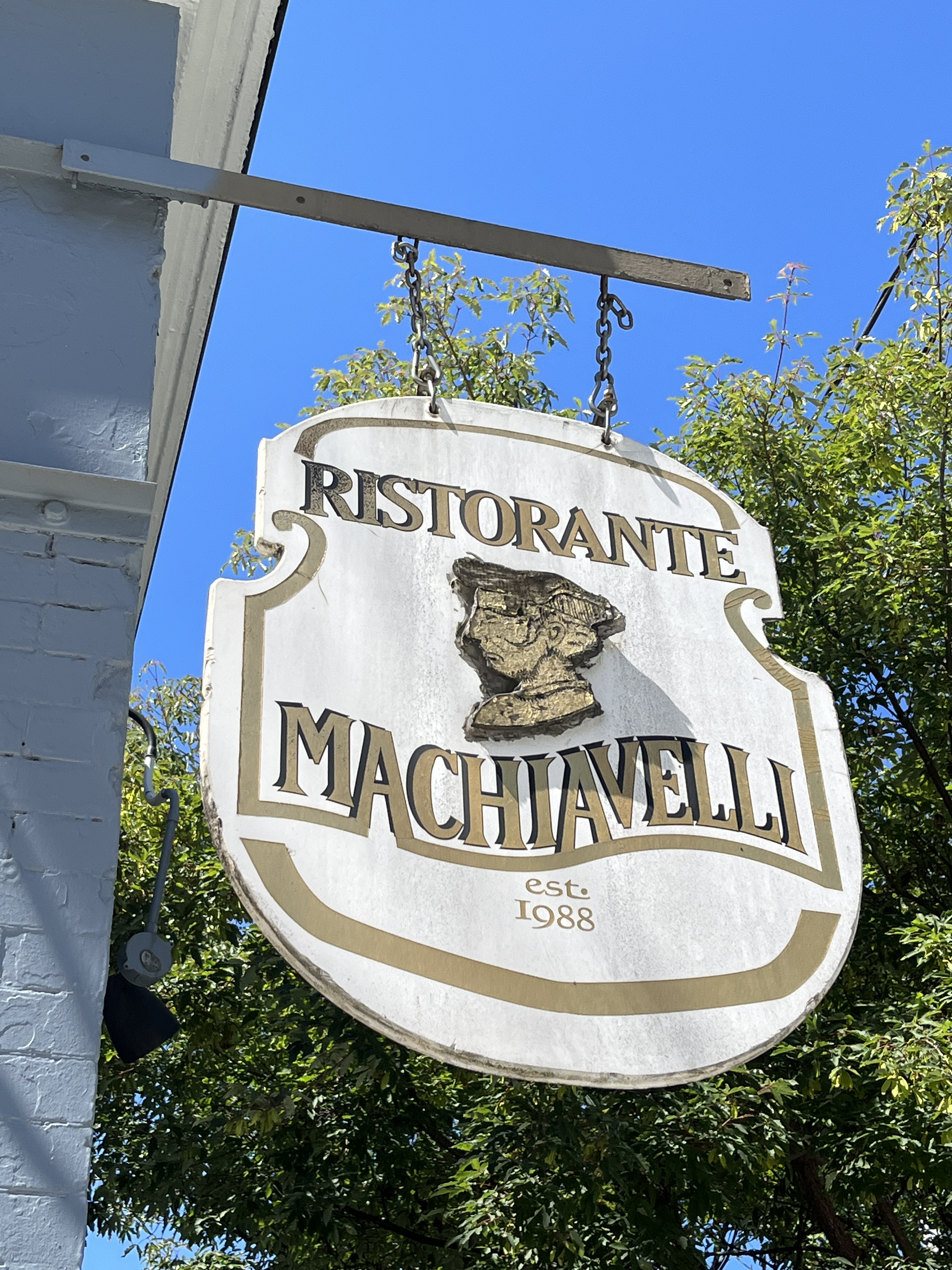
Exterior sign, 2022

Ristorante Machiavelli was established by Tom and Linda McElroy in 1988. According to Leora Y. Bloom of The Seattle Times, "In 1988, its location on the edge of Capitol Hill, just across Interstate 5 from downtown, was seedy and cheap. The previous business was a dingy, windowless bar. The McElroys gutted the dining room, installed windows along the outer walls and pulled out a walk-in refrigerator that took up half the kitchen." Bloom said the couple "developed a menu of simple, well-seasoned Italian food, kept the place casual, and treated their staff like family, and ever since, every night (except Sunday) finds a happy, noisy crowd enjoying their favorite dishes and carafes of wine at small tables covered with red vinyl tablecloths".

The couple brought on two longtime employees as business partners in 2007, before transferring ownership to them in 2013. The current owners are Suzette Jarding and Javier Arevalo, who began working at the restaurant in 1999 as a hostess and chef, respectively. Ristorante Machiavelli's menu has changed little in three decades. Historically, the restaurant has offered a discount for patrons who pay using cash.

Ristorante Machiavelli experienced a staffing shortage in 2021, which forced at least one temporary closure in August. In 2022, the Booker Building was sold to the private San Francisco-based company Prado Group. A second location in Edmonds opened in December 2023 after renovating the former Chanterelle restaurant in downtown. Ristorante Machiavelli on Capitol Hill closed on February 15, 2024.

== Reception ==
=== Magazines and newspapers ===
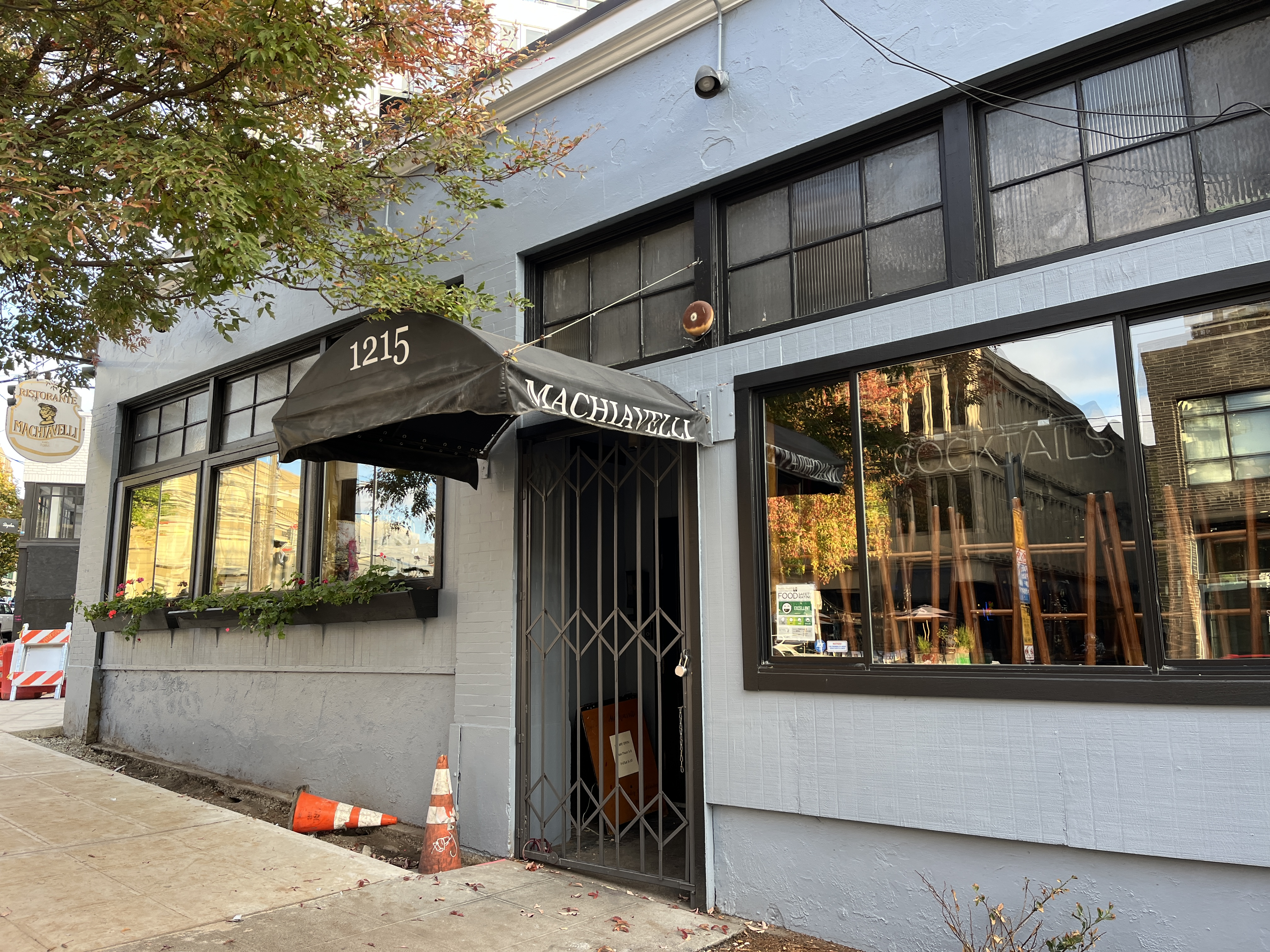
The Capitol Hill restaurant's exterior, 2022

In 2019, Machiavelli was featured by Bon Appétit in a series of articles about old-school Italian restaurants in the U.S. In 2009, the Seattle Post-Intelligencer said, "Machiavelli is the perfect balm for our troubled times, a cozy ristorante serving deeply satisfying fare at astonishingly low prices." Leora Y. Bloom of The Seattle Times wrote in 2015: "The menu never changes, and if it did there'd probably be a revolution. The food is well-prepared, reasonably priced and consistent... If you love a dish, you will love it every time you order it, because they aren't reinventing it every time you come. Food trends come and go, but Machiavelli sticks to what it does best." Bloom also said, "Citywide press often recommends Machiavelli for a first date, and countless couples have followed that advice. There's just the right amount of ambient noise and light; the price is right; it isn't fancy; and service is quick and efficient, just in case things don't go well. Many of those couples come back to propose marriage, and over the years their kids join their tables."

Seattle Metropolitan has said the veal "is a house specialty and a guilty pleasure" and the steak, "known among cognoscenti, is a triumph". Seattle Magazine recommended the penne with roasted red pepper sauce in a 2013 overview of the best dishes at local Italian restaurants and said, "You'll sip the restaurant's cheap house red, you'll happily devour too much of the pasta and then you'll likely need to go home for a long winter's nap." Chona Kasinger included Ristorante Machiavelli in Thrillist's 2014 list of Seattle's 11 "most underrated restaurants, according to experts". Kasinger quoted Bethany Jean Clement, a restaurant reviewer and arts editor for The Stranger, who said:

Machiavelli is a reliable friend. The lasagna with spinach noodles and chicken livers is the kind of thing you think about suddenly for no apparent reason -- then you must have it that night, or the next night, or some night very soon. It is especially satisfying in the winter when passersby look cold and miserable, while inside everyone is insulated with good company, beverages, and anticipation. Machiavelli isn't fancy, it's just always good.

Clement's review of the restaurant said "Everything looks and tastes exactly like it should-anti-fancy, hugely portioned, rich, and eminently satisfying... Machiavelli's personable bartenders and swift, friendly servers are among the best in town-no pretension, just goodness, like the entire place." The Stranger included the restaurant in a 2016 list of 50 "places in Seattle that you're taking for granted". The newspaper said, "Machiavelli is the most dependable and reassuring restaurant in Seattle—the service is always competent and confident, and the food always delicious and fast... The dining room is the sort of place where everyone feels at home, and, best of all, Machiavelli is affordable."

Noms Magazine's 2023 list of Seattle's twelve best Italian restaurants says Ristorante Machiavelli "has an enduring charm and timeless menu that many people love... With the best Italian food and splendid service, Ristorante Machiavelli is a true Italian treasure in Capitol Hill area."

=== Restaurant guides and review websites ===
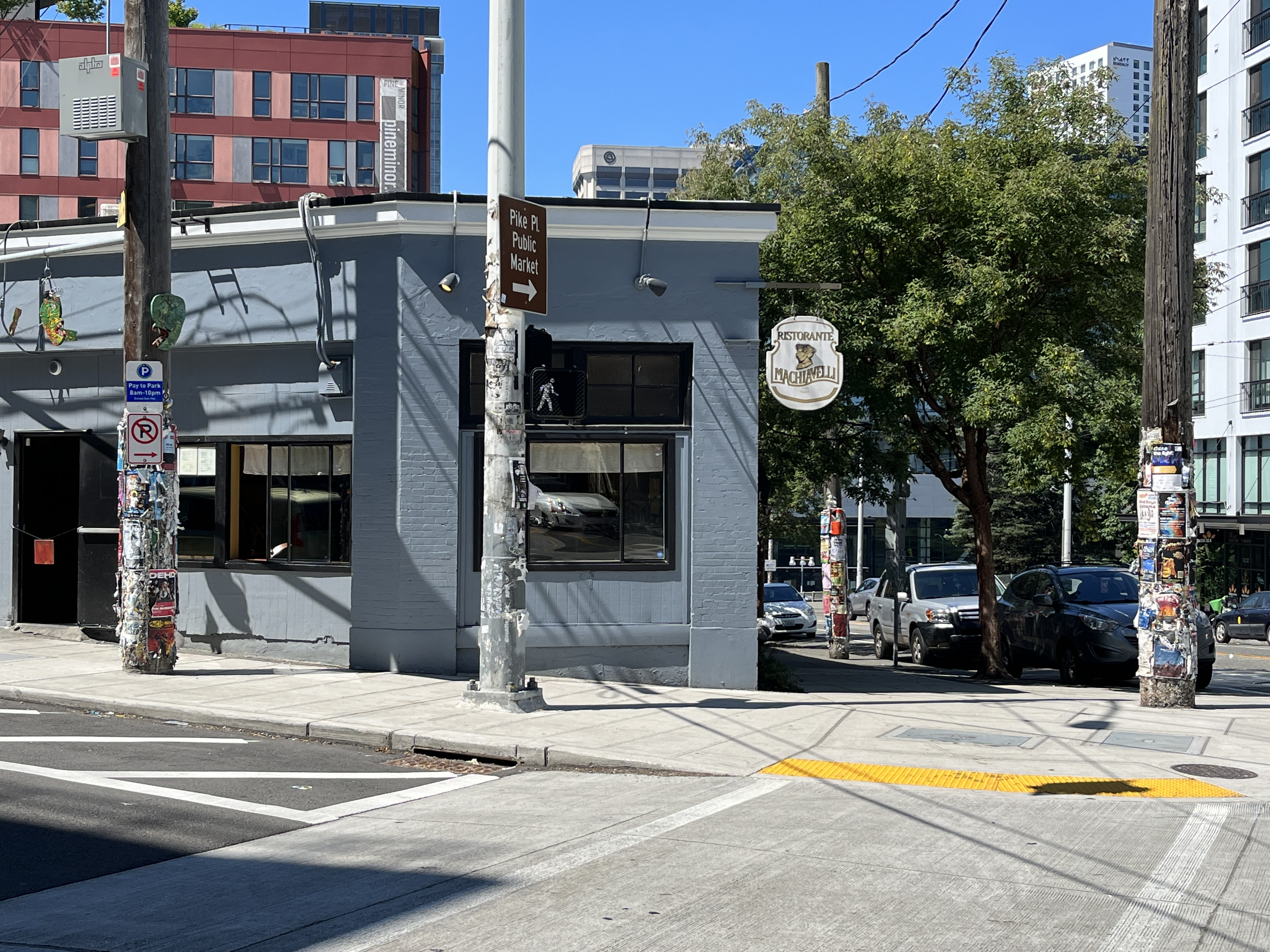
The Capitol Hill restaurant's exterior, 2023

Surly Gourmand included Ristorante Machiavelli in Eater Seattle's 2012 overview of the city's best lasagna. Julien Perry included the business in a 2013 list of Seattle's ten "most underrated" restaurants, as voted by readers, and Jason Price included Ristorante Machiavelli in a 2015 guide to Seattle's "meanest" meatballs. The website's 2022 overview of "where to get fantastic pasta" in the city said the penne with roasted red pepper, walnuts, and cream was "supremely satisfying".

Aimee Rizzo included Ristorante Machiavelli in The Infatuation's 2022 list of Seattle's best Italian restaurants. In her review, she wrote, "There are a bunch of Italian restaurants on Capitol Hill. There are also plenty of romantic spots on the hill, too. But you usually can't have both of these things and not end up spending a ton of money. That is, unless you go to Machiavelli." She also said, "You might have a slight wait for a table, but it usually is manageable and works really well for an impromptu pasta night." Emma Banks and Bradley Foster included the business in Thrillist's 2022 list of Seattle's fourteen best Italian restaurants. The duo said Ristorante Machiavelli is "unfussy, always comfortable, never too expensive, and, thus, an all-around favorite for classic Italian food done right".

=== Guide books and local news affiliates ===
In Seattle (1998), published by Lonely Planet, Bill and W. C. McRae said the "no-fuss" establishment "is a favorite for those who like full-flavored Italian cooking without having to endure all the trappings of a high-altitude restaurant". Best Places Seattle (1999) says, "There seems to be an Italian restaurant on every corner in town, but few corners attract as many happy campers as Pine and Melrose." Let's Go guide books have called Ristorante Machiavelli a "small" and "bustling" establishment "with deep Seattle roots whose simplicity in decor and food proves it has nothing to prove". The guides also say the gnocchi "are widely considered the best in town". Jeffrey Totey of Tacoma's KSTW included Ristorante Machiavelli in a 2017 overview of Seattle's best ravioli. In 2018, Karina Mazhukhina of KOMO-TV said, "With classic Italian dishes lining the tables and an array of familiar patrons spanning 30 years, Ristorante Machiavelli stands as a remnant of old Seattle in a city that's towering with construction cranes."

== See also ==
- List of Italian restaurants
