= Barbajada =

Italian chocolate coffee drink

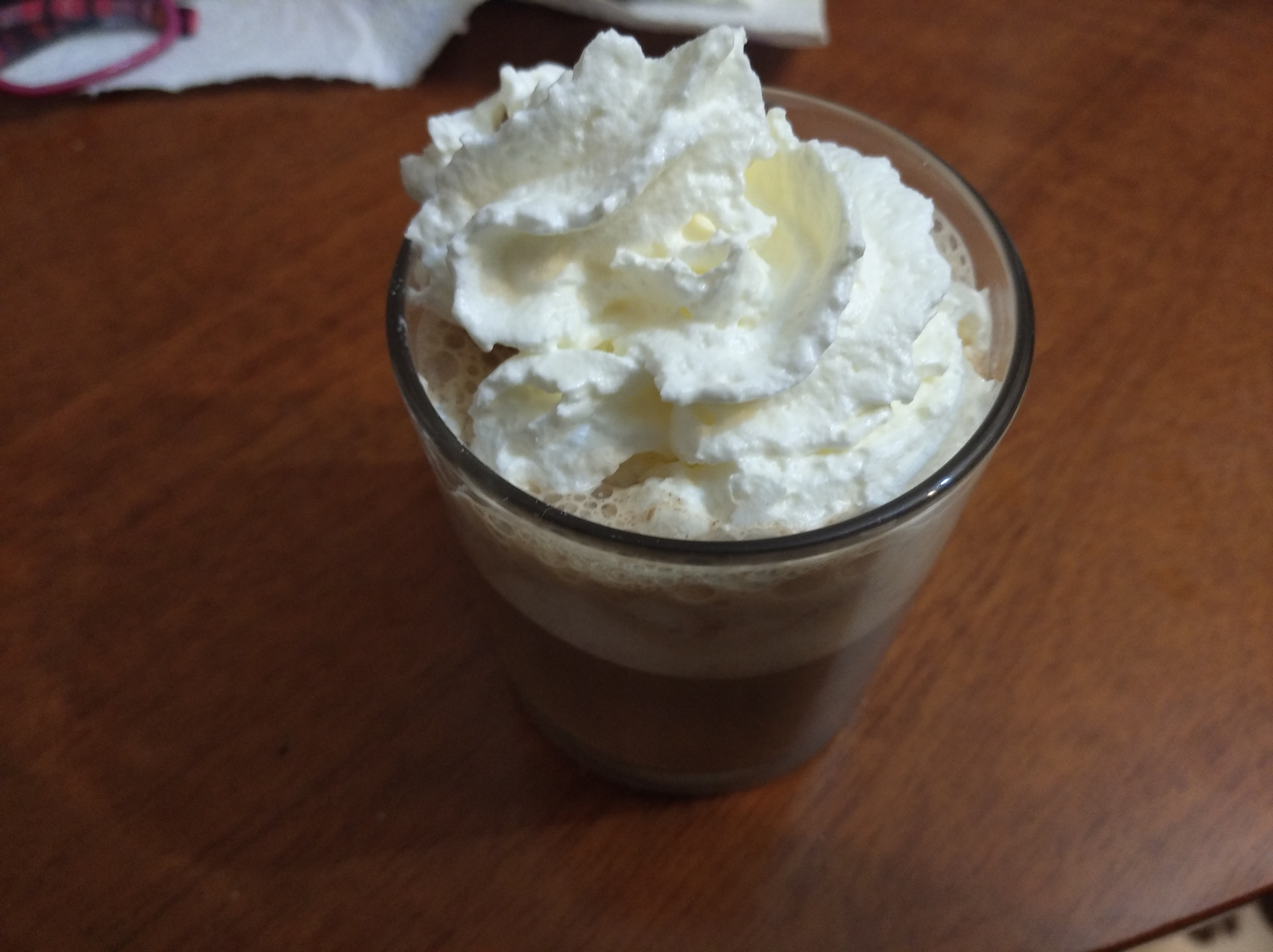
- Alternative names: Barbagliata
- Type: Beverage
- Place of origin: Italy
- Region or state: Milan
- Associated cuisine: Italian (Milanese)
- Created by: Domenico Barbaja
- Serving temperature: Warm (winter) and cool (summer)
- Main ingredients: Chocolate, milk, coffee, sugar, optionally cream

Barbajada, also italianized as barbagliata, is a Milanese sweet frothy drink, popular in the 19th century and the early decades of the 20th century, but still occasionally served today. It is made with whipped chocolate, milk and coffee in equal parts, along with any amount of sugar, and possibly topped with cream. It is served warm in winter, usually to accompany desserts such as the panettone or other Milanese delicacies. In the past there was also a cold version served in summer.

Reportedly, the recipe was a creation of Domenico Barbaja (hence the name), who was at the time a garzone (waiter) in a café. The drink was so successful that Barbaja eventually grew rich enough to become a theatrical impresario, as well as the owner of a café in the luxury venue of Piazza della Scala.

== See also ==
- List of Italian desserts and pastries

== Sources ==
- Eisenbeiss, Philip (2013), Bel Canto Bully: The Life of the Legendary Opera Impresario Domenico Barbaja. London: Haus Publishing, 2013. ISBN 1908323256. ISBN 978-1-908323-25-5.
