= Cheese in Kenya =

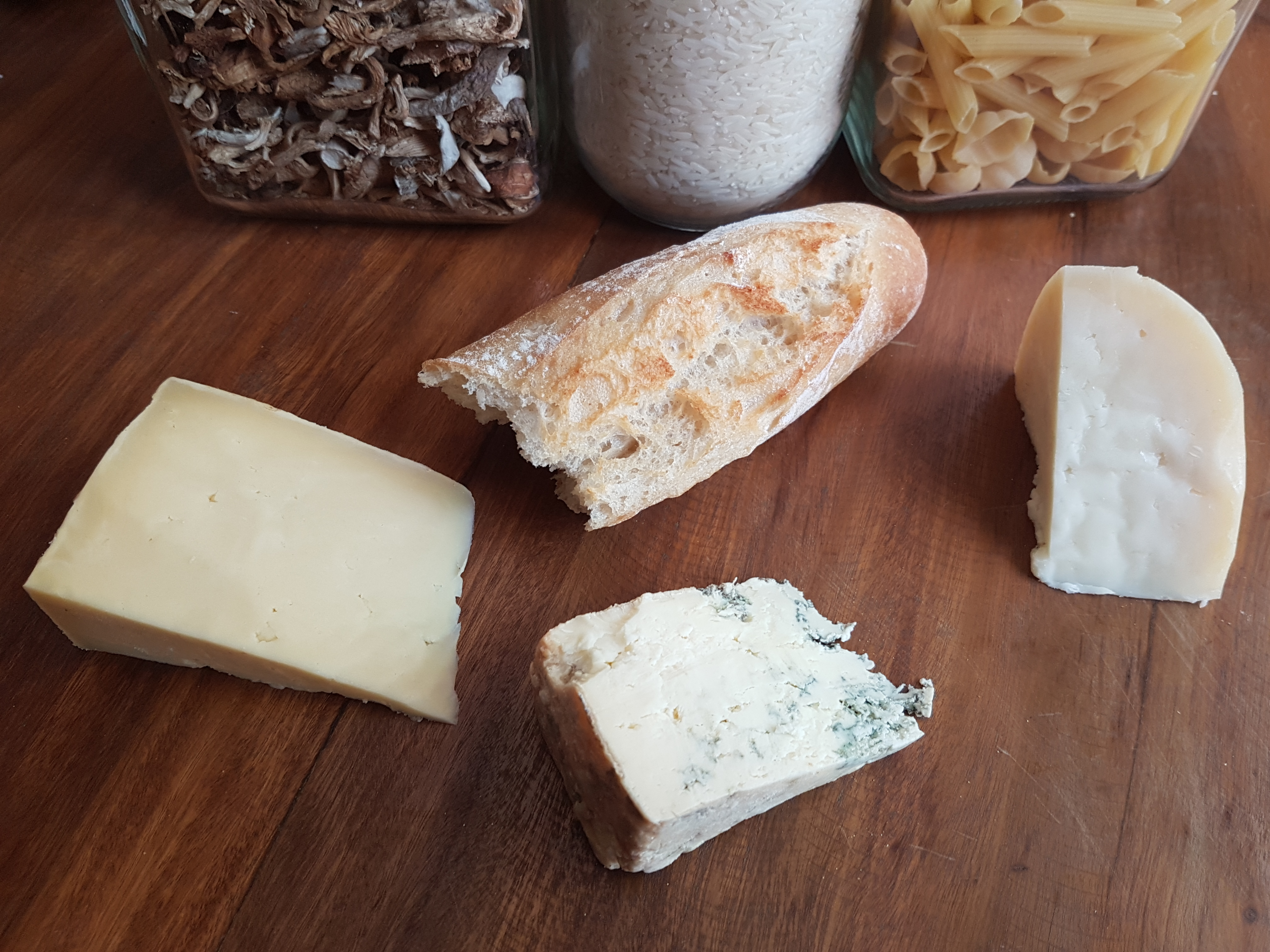
Cheddar, blue cheese and goat gouda from Brown's

Several companies make cheese in Kenya. Though cheese is not a traditional Kenyan food, the market is expanding. Cheese consumption has been increasing within the Kenyan middle-class.

As of 2016, the five largest manufacturers of cheese in Kenya were Browns, active since the 1970s with 22% of the market; Raka, established 2001 with 19%; Dama Dairy established 1994, Happy Cow Kenya, Eldoville Dairies and New Kenya Co-operative Creameries (New KCC).

Cheese produced in Kenya includes Cheddar, Gouda, blue cheese, feta, mascarpone, ricotta, mozzarella and brie.
