= Palazzo Barbaja, Naples =

Palace in Naples, Italy

Coordinates: 40.838889°N 14.248544°E

Palazzo Barbaja is a palace located on via Toledo of the quartiere San Ferdinando of Naples, Italy.

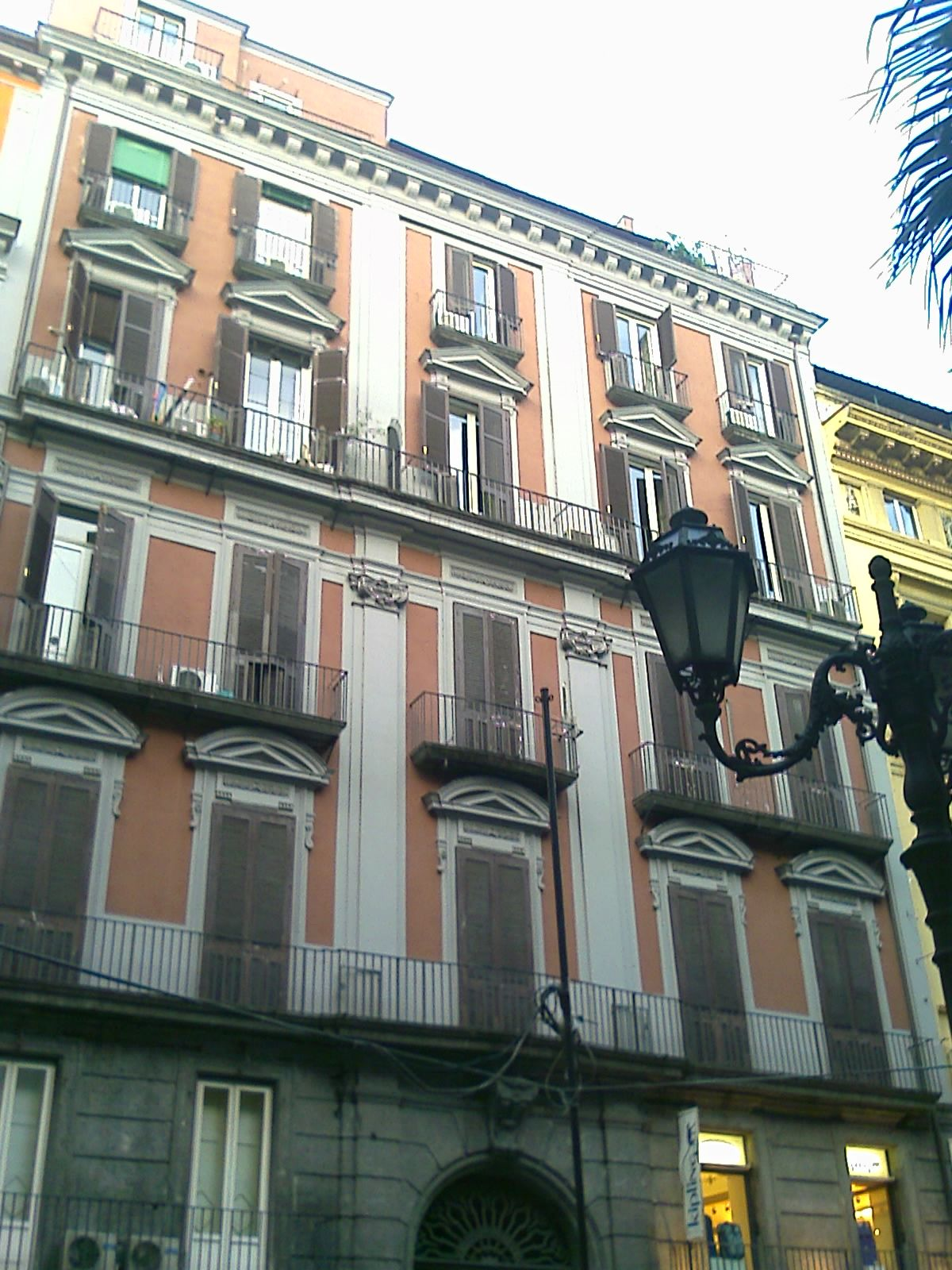
Facade

The palace was the home of Domenico Barbaja, a famous theater impresario of 19th century Naples. In the years 1815–1822, Gioacchino Rossini was his guest at times. Rossini had a contract with the Teatro del Fondo to write the music for the libretto of Francesco Berio Salsa to Otello. Berio also lived nearby. Because of his dilatory progress, Rossini was almost imprisoned in his room until he finished the music.

The building dates back to 16th century and was remodeled in the second half of the 18th century in a sober neoclassical style. The ground floor and the mezzanine are covered in ashlar blocks. The first two floors above the ground are marked by giant Ionic pilasters.

== Bibliography ==
- Aurelio De Rose, I Palazzi di Napoli. Storia, curiosità e aneddoti che si tramadano da secoli su questi straordinari testimoni della vita partenopea, Newton e Compton editor, Naples, 2004.
