= Milanese cuisine =

Culinary traditions of Milan, Italy

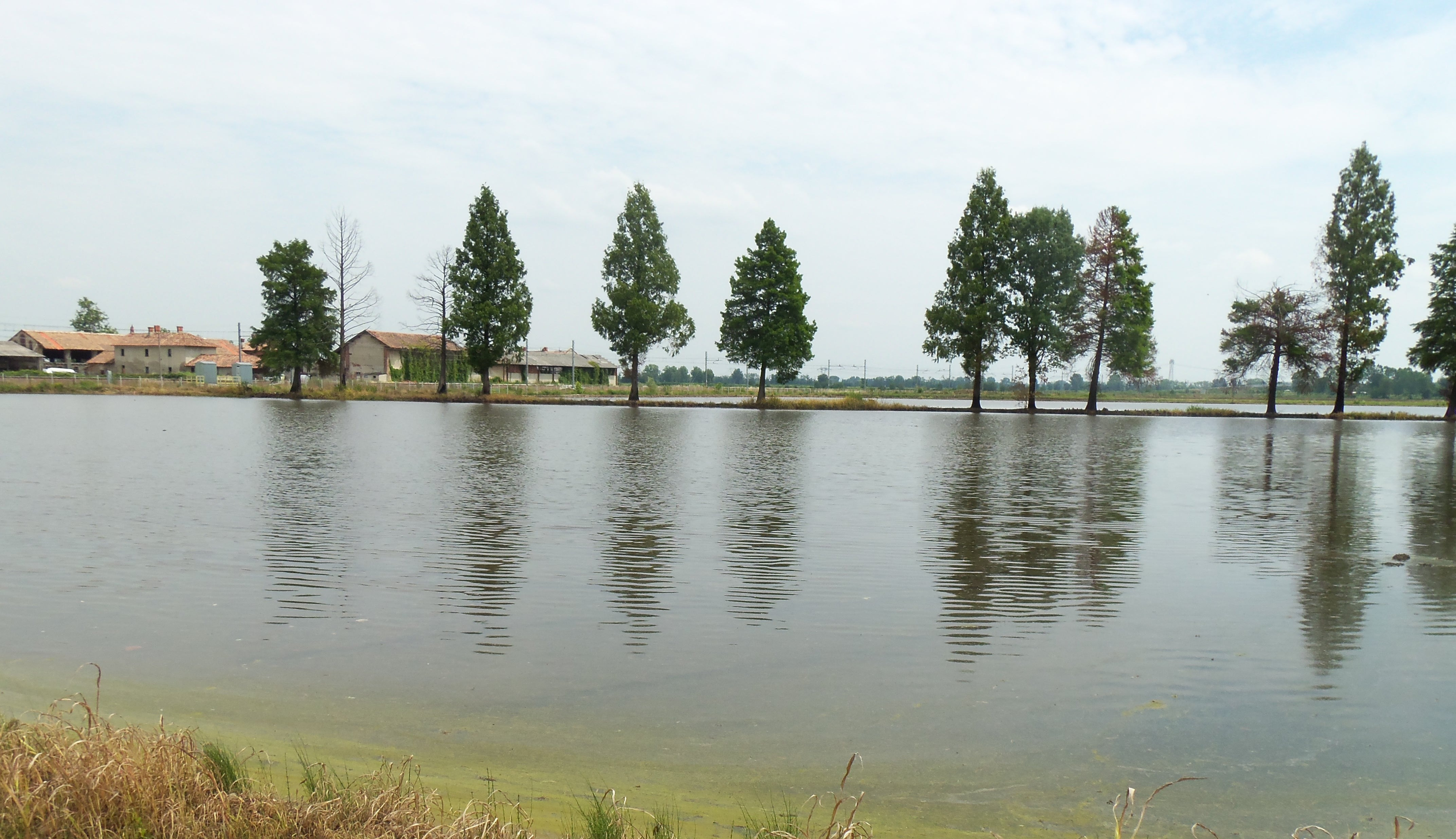
Rice paddies in Vermezzo, on the outskirts of Milan

Milanese cuisine encompasses the culinary traditions of Milan, characterized by the region's fertile agricultural resources and influenced by historical interactions with neighboring cultures. The cuisine reflects a balance of rustic and refined elements, shaped by the availability of local ingredients and seasonal variations.

Prominent dishes include risotto alla milanese, flavored with saffron, the breaded veal cutlet known as cotoletta alla milanese, the braised veal shank dish ossobuco, and the traditional Christmas cake panettone. Other specialties include cassœula, a pork and cabbage stew, and busecca, a tripe dish. The cuisine is further distinguished by its extensive use of dairy products, such as butter for frying and cheeses like gorgonzola, grana padano, and mascarpone. Cornmeal is a staple, used in polenta and yellow bread, contributing to the cuisine’s hearty character.

== History ==
=== Cuisine in the Celtic-Roman period ===
The fertile lands and advanced irrigation systems established during Roman times ensured abundant forage, supporting extensive cattle farming and a cuisine rich in beef and dairy products. The migration of the Biturgi Gauls, led by Belloveso, who coexisted with the Insubrians and founded Milan, highlights the region’s agricultural productivity. The Celts introduced cereal cultivation, including rye, barley, and wheat, with wheat used for white bread, facilitated by the marshy plains of the region. Pig farming, yielding lard for cooking, was also significant, establishing foundational culinary practices such as polenta, cereal-based doughs, and stewing techniques.

Roman settlers preserved Celtic culinary traditions while introducing lamb and kid, further diversifying the protein sources available in Milanese cuisine.

=== The Middle Ages ===
The early Middle Ages marked a period of economic and culinary decline for Milan due to invasions and plundering between the 3rd and 4th centuries AD. The population resorted to foraged ingredients like berries, roots, and herbs, and temporarily abandoned beef consumption. Procopius of Caesarea documented the dire food scarcity, noting that residents consumed unconventional foods such as dogs and rats. Under Lombard rule, social disparities widened, with wealthier classes enjoying diverse foods like cereals, poultry, and game, prepared in clay vessels, while poorer groups relied on simpler fare.

By around 1000 AD, an agricultural revival bolstered the economy, reflected in lavish banquets hosted by the canons of Sant’Ambrogio. Historian Pietro Verri described these feasts, which included dishes like cold chickens, pork, and stuffed pies, precursors to modern Milanese cutlets.

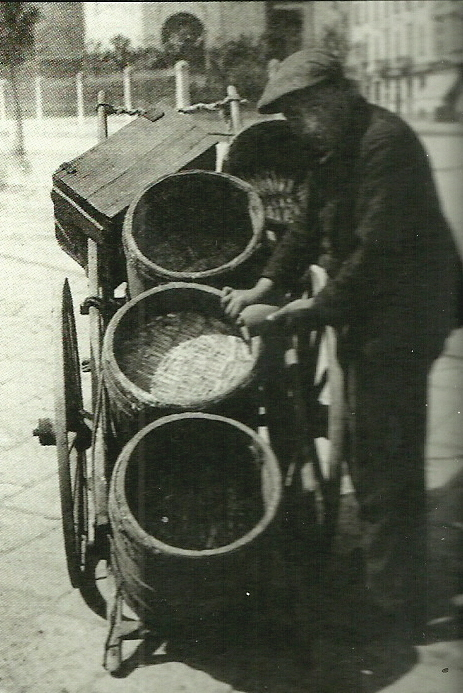
Milan, (1920) an anchovy seller

Monastic records from the 11th to 12th centuries detail the trade in grains and oils derived from walnuts, flax, or rapeseed, indicating a varied diet. Bonvesin de la Riva provided detailed accounts of market organization and dining customs in his 1288 work, "De quinquaginta curialitatibus ad mensam", describing the foods and table manners of Milanese society. A notable example is the 1368 banquet hosted by Galeazzo Visconti for the wedding of his daughter Violante to Lionel of Antwerp, featuring eighteen courses with ingredients like pigs and calves.

The introduction of rice farming in the mid-15th century, enabled by Visconti and Sforza land reclamations, transformed Milanese agriculture and diets. In 1475, Galeazzo Maria Sforza praised rice’s high yield, gifting seeds to the Duke of Ferrara, Ercole I.

=== Spanish domination ===
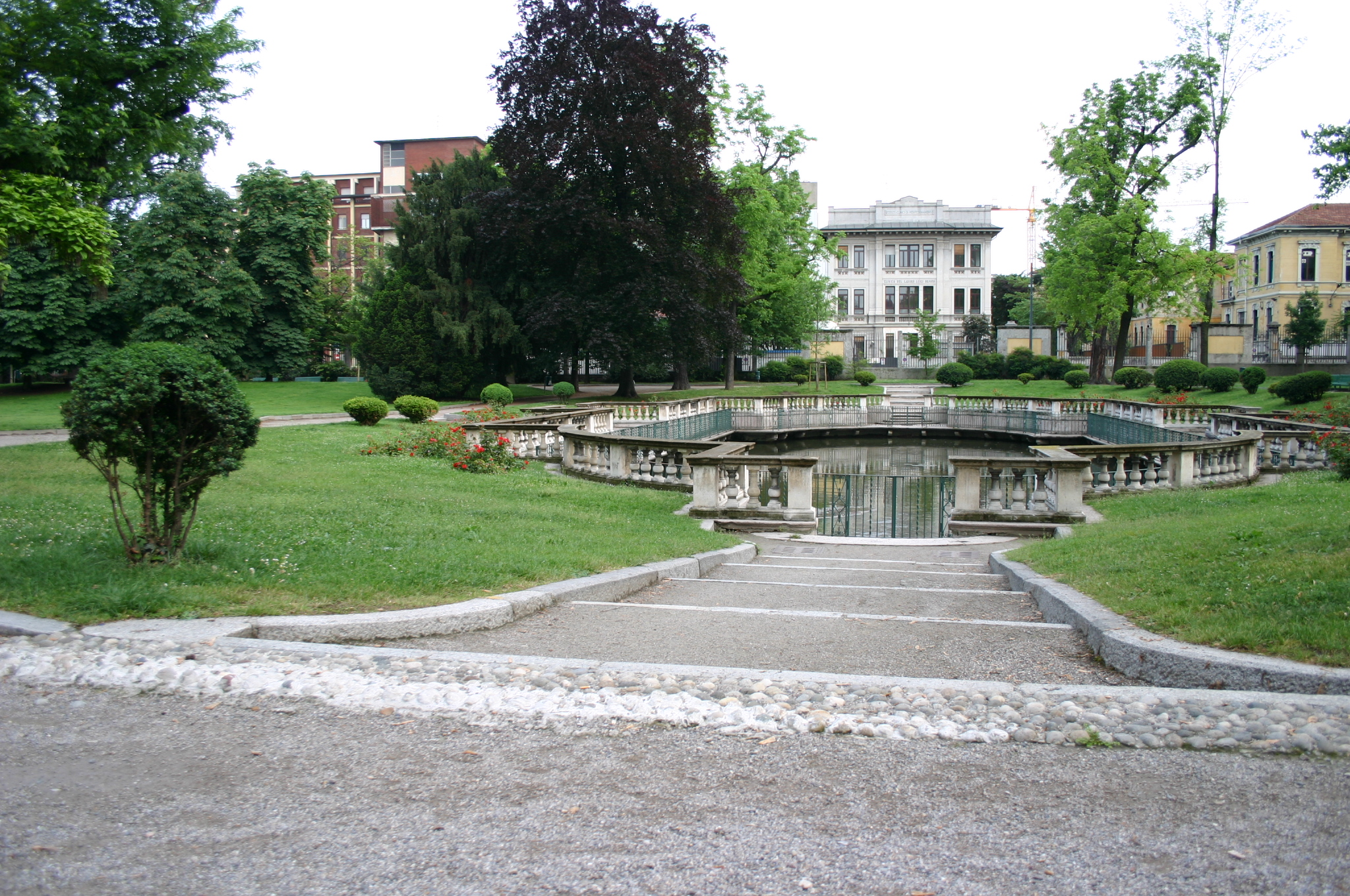
The fishpond in the gardens of via Guastalla, next to the Navigli Circle.

During the 16th and 17th centuries, Spanish rule brought economic hardship to Milan, yet introduced dishes like cassœula and mondeghili that became culinary staples. The nobility enjoyed sophisticated dishes such as eggs in rosewater and fish in almond milk, while the lower classes faced poverty exacerbated by wars, plagues, and famines.

The adoption of corn by the lower classes, due to its affordability and high yield, led to widespread polenta consumption, which caused pellagra due to nutritional deficiencies.

=== Austrian domination ===
The 18th century, under Austrian rule, saw economic prosperity driven by agricultural investments, revitalizing Milanese cuisine. The Enlightenment introduced refined culinary techniques and exotic ingredients like coffee, cocoa, tea, and tomatoes, previously considered ornamental. Food began to be viewed as a cultural expression, as noted by philosopher Pietro Verri, who praised delicate flavors in his correspondence.

=== The Napoleonic period ===
The 19th century emphasized the historical significance of Milanese cuisine, prompting the creation of culinary literature to preserve gastronomic traditions. Notable works include Il cuoco piemontese ridotto all’ultimo gusto con nuove aggiunte per uso anche della nostra Lombardia (1832), which adapted French-influenced recipes for Lombard use, and La cucina facile, economica e salubre (1844). Upscale establishments like Vauxhall on Strada Marina and Mount Tabor in Porta Romana catered to the bourgeoisie, offering refined dining experiences. Menus from luxury venues like Albergo Europa in 1836 listed diverse dishes, including schnitzel, roast turkey, and cheeses like gorgonzola and stracchino.

=== After the unification of Italy ===
Post-unification in the late 19th century, Milan experienced rapid industrialization and population growth, leading to increased poverty among the working class. The 1877 Jacini Inquiry, initiated by Stefano Jacini, revealed that laborers subsisted on polenta, fried codfish, and mixed bread. In contrast, the elite enjoyed sophisticated cuisine, with contributions from chefs like Giuseppe Sorbiatti, who refined the Milanese cutlet, and the establishment of Peck by a Prague charcutier.

=== The 20th century ===
In the early 20th century, Milanese cuisine faced a decline in restaurants, where Tuscan dishes overshadowed local traditions, relegating Milanese recipes to home kitchens. A revival occurred with Gualtiero Marchesi, who opened a restaurant in 1977, reinterpreting traditional dishes and earning two Michelin Guide stars and, in 1986, the guide’s highest rating.

== Typical dishes ==
=== Appetizers ===
Milanese appetizers typically feature a platter of mixed cold cuts, including salami, salame cotto, prosciutto crudo, spalla cotta, and prosciutto cotto with smoked tongue historically common. Cheese, traditionally served at the meal’s end, is now often paired with cold cuts in restaurants. (Note: There is a Milanese adage that says that "the mouth is not tired if it doesn't taste like a cow", or that you can't properly end a meal without cheese.) Festive occasions include richer starters like paté di fegato alla Milanese (calf’s liver pie), aspic with meats and vegetables in jelly, and galantine, a poultry or game sausage. Tavern appetizers, now considered starters, include insalata di nervetti (calf tendons with onions and beans), giardiniera with pickled vegetables, salted anchovies, and savoiarda, a salad of calf’s head and pickled vegetables. Once-popular items like boiled crayfish and busecchin (blood sausage) are now rare due to changing tastes and ingredient availability.

=== First courses ===
==== Risottos ====
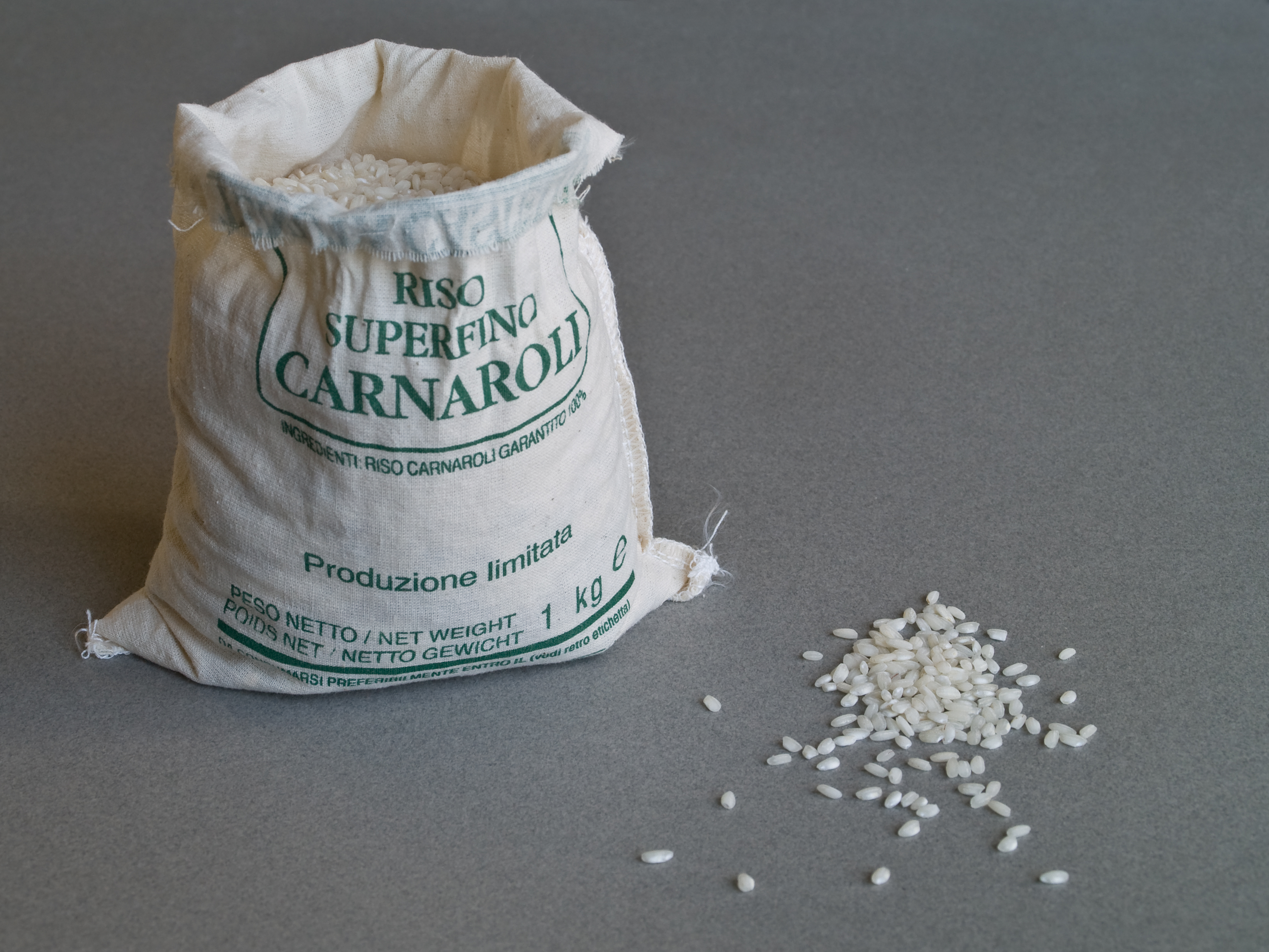
Carnaroli rice, the most suitable variety for preparing risotto

Risotto alla milanese, a saffron-infused dish, is Milan’s iconic first course, prepared with Carnaroli rice, bone marrow, butter, and grated cheese. Numerous regional variants incorporate local ingredients, such as luganega sausage, pumpkin, mushrooms, or gorgonzola, reflecting the diversity of Milanese agriculture. (Note: The following references are from Giuseppe Fontana, Martino Vaona, Milan at the Table, Gianni Brera, Ermanno Sogliani, and The Silver Spoon op.cit.)

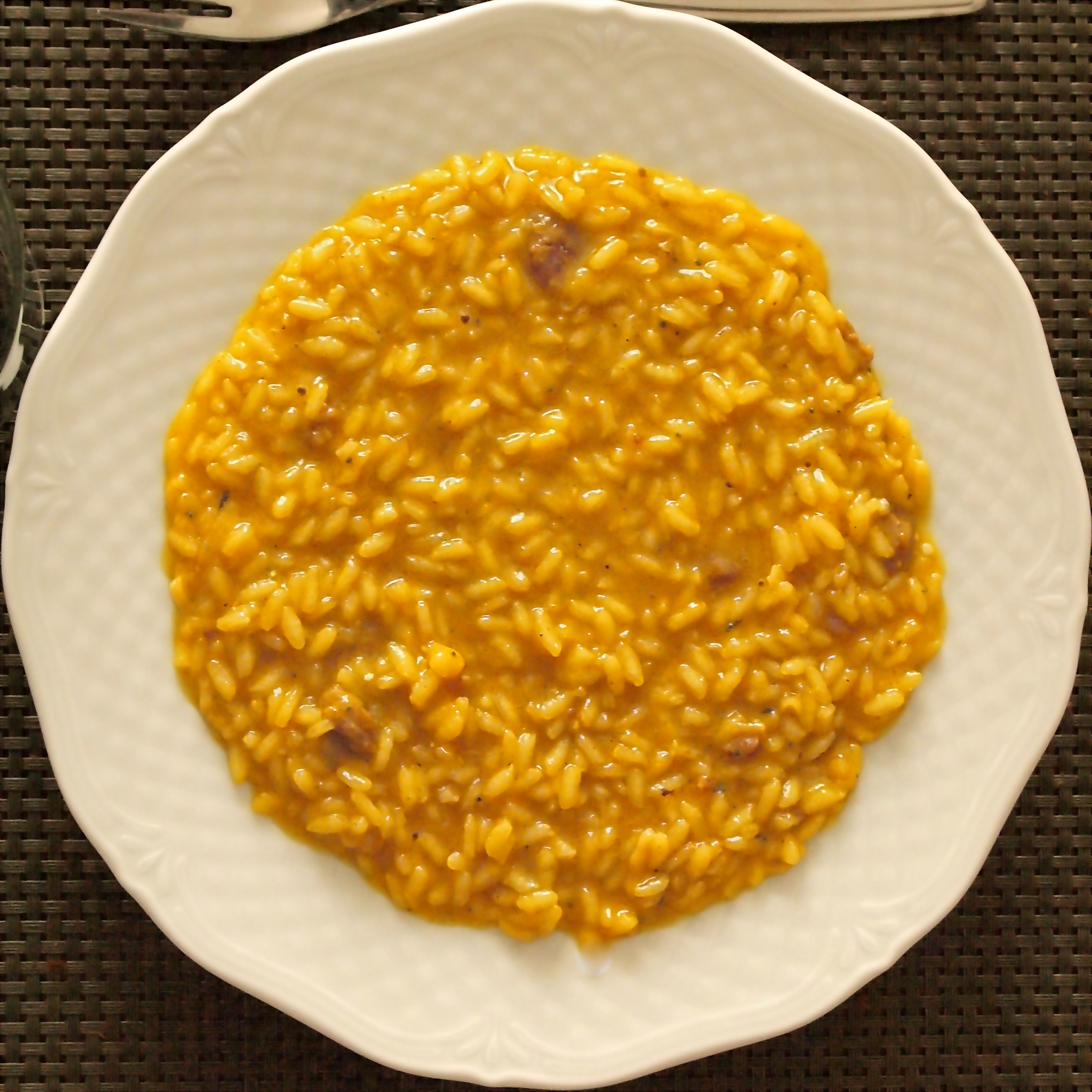
Milanese risotto

Risotto al salto, made from leftover risotto, is pan-fried to form a crisp crust. Another rice-based dish, rice in cagnone, is boiled and sautéed with butter, garlic, and sage, often combined with vegetables or meats.

==== Pasta in broth ====
Filled pasta or egg pasta in broth is common, including ravioli di magro with ricotta and herb fillings, or meat ravioli for festive occasions. Simpler dishes like pancotto (stale bread boiled in broth) and sbrofadej (a passatelli variant) utilize leftovers, reflecting frugal traditions.

==== Soups ====
Minestrone alla milanese, a hearty vegetable and rice soup with pork rinds and beans, exemplifies Lombard plain cuisine. Other soups listed by Cherubini include rice with broad beans, parsley, or frogs.

=== Main courses ===
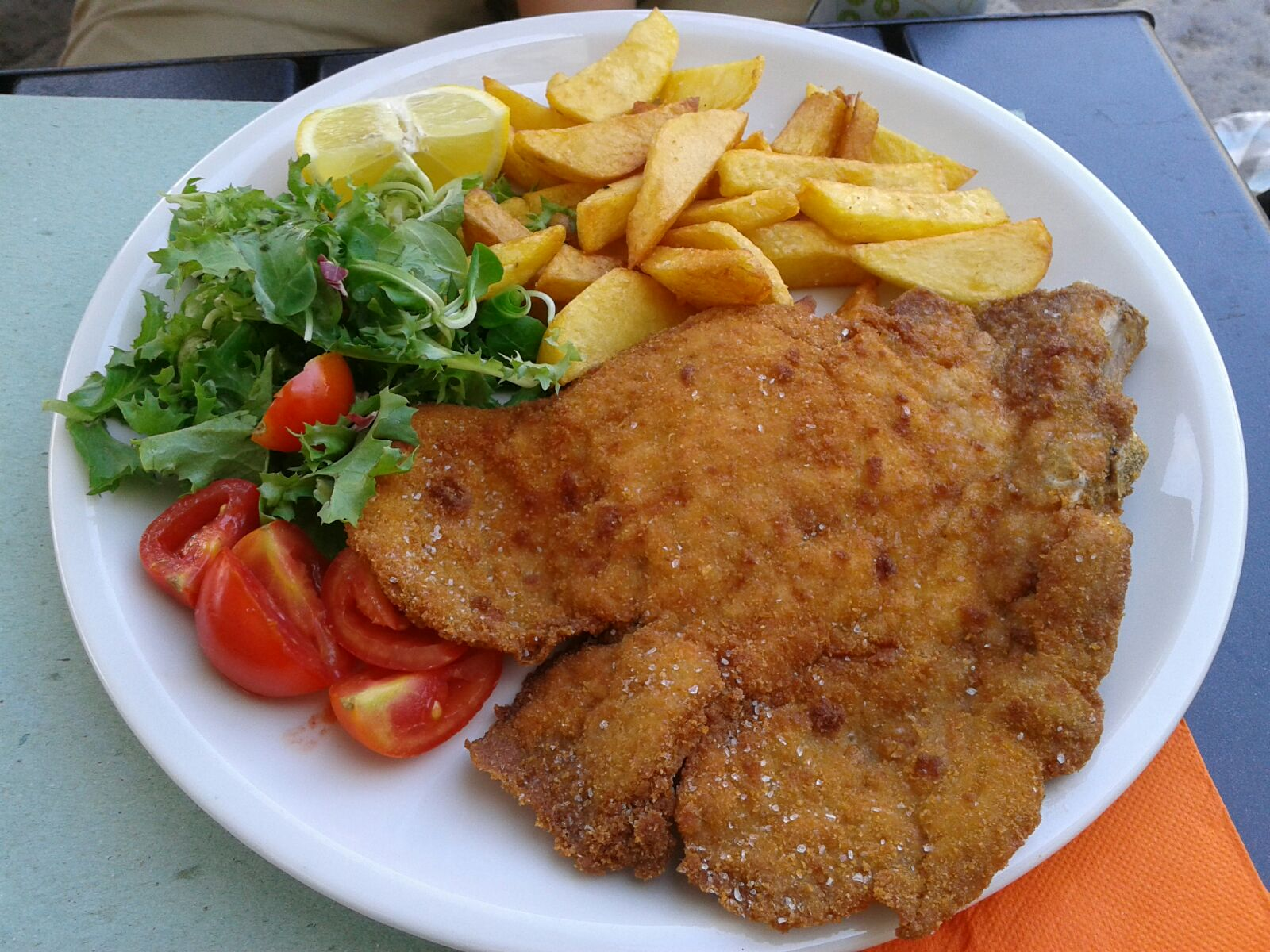
Milanese cutlet

Meat dominates Milanese main courses, leveraging the region’s livestock abundance. Veal and pork are central, with dishes like cotoletta alla milanese (breaded veal chop) and cassœula (pork and cabbage stew) rooted in Celtic traditions.

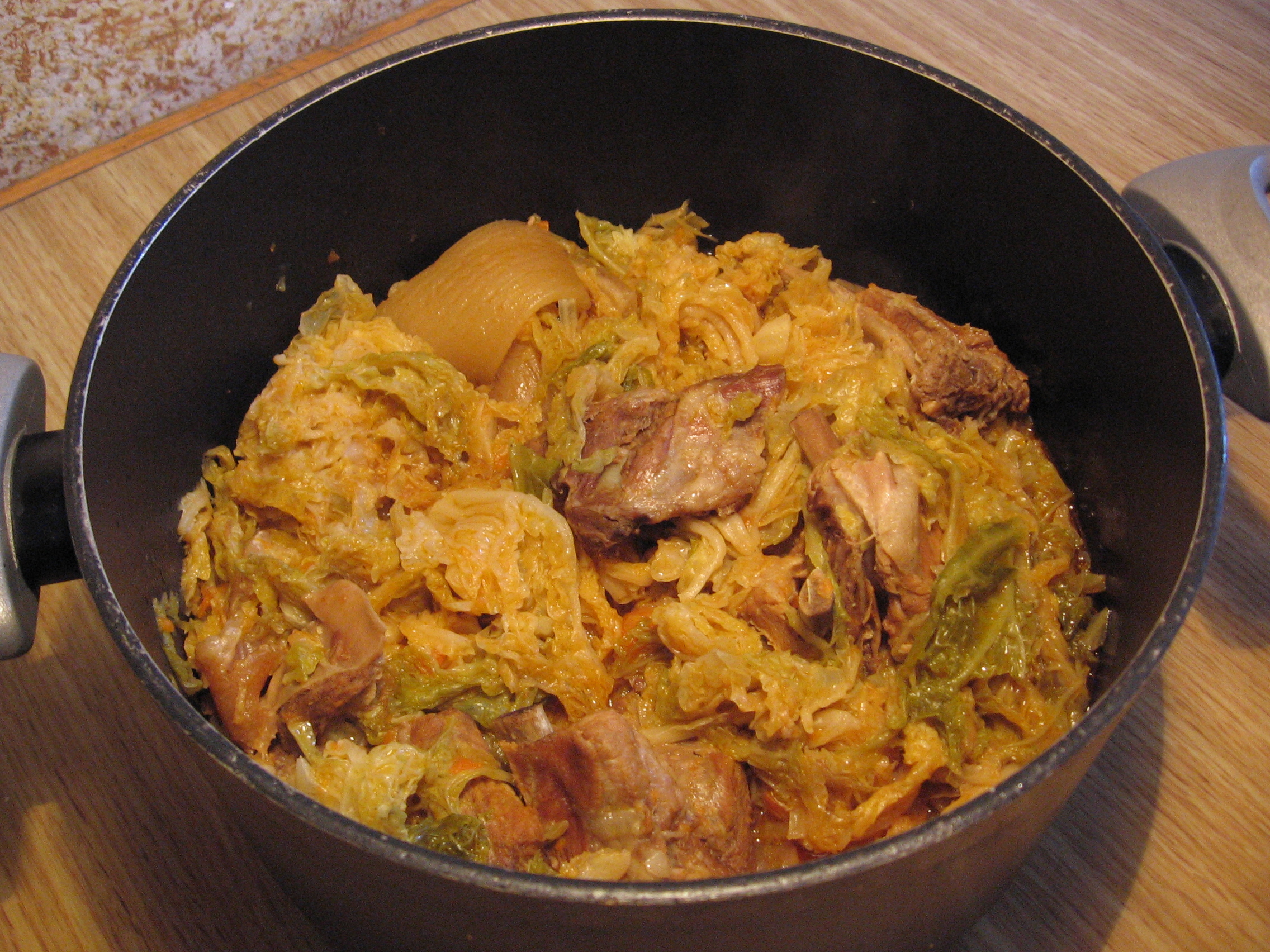
Cassoeula

Ossobuco, stewed tripe (busecca), and rosticciada (pork stew) are also prominent. Fish, once sourced from local rivers, included eel and frogs, now largely replaced by imported seafood.

==== Meat and vegetable dishes ====
Key dishes include cotoletta alla milanese, prepared with young veal and fried in butter, and ossobuco, served with gremolada and often paired with risotto. Cassœula, linked to the feast of St. Anthony the Abbot, combines pork with savoy cabbage. Other dishes like rostin negàa (veal knots) and polenta e bruscitt (shredded beef) highlight slow-cooking techniques.

==== Seafood dishes ====
Historically, river fish like eel and frogs were staples, prepared marinated or fried. Modern dishes may incorporate imported fish, such as perch-based meatballs for lean days.

=== Polenta and customary dishes ===
Polenta, a dietary cornerstone, is served unseasoned, fried, or enriched with cheeses like gorgonzola. Other dishes, like bollito misto alla lombarda and vitello tonnato, reflect regional influences.

=== Side dishes, sauces, and condiments ===
Vegetable side dishes, such as breaded mushrooms or asparagus with buttered eggs, complement meat courses. Sauces for boiled meats include red, green, and yellow varieties, alongside fruit-based condiments like Milanese mostarda.

=== Other specialties ===
Unique dishes include cervellaa, a sausage without brains despite its name, and torta alla Milanese, a savory pie with meat and chocolate.

=== Desserts ===
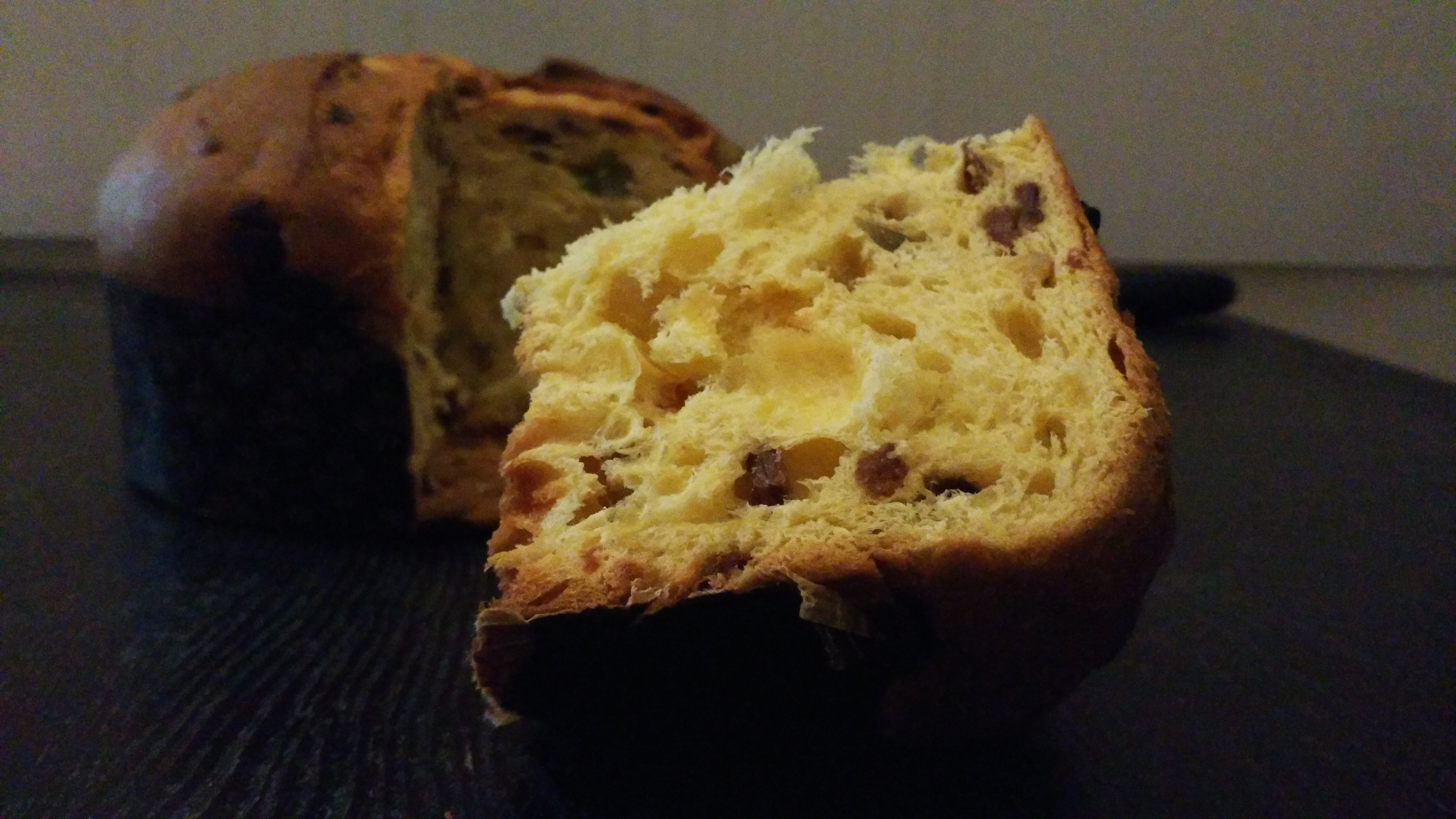
Panettone, Milan's classic Christmas cake.

Panettone, a leavened bread with raisins, is Milan’s signature Christmas dessert, documented by 1606. Other sweets include the Venetian, colomba, and chestnut-based busecchina. Traditional cakes like meneghina and torta paciarella use local ingredients, while oss de mord and pan dei morti are prepared for the Day of the Dead.

== Typical and traditional products ==
=== Cheeses ===
Cheeses are integral to Milanese cuisine, with a proverb emphasizing their role in concluding meals. Notable varieties include gorgonzola, grana padano, and mascarpone, alongside provolone Valpadana and taleggio.

=== Bread ===
The michetta, a white wheat bread, is Milan’s traditional loaf, with variants like pan de mej (cornmeal bread) reflecting historical grain diversity.

=== Wines and liquors ===
Viticulture in Milan dates to Roman times, with modern production centered in San Colombano al Lambro, yielding San Colombano al Lambro D.O.C. and Collina del Milanese I.G.T. wines. Milan is also known for liqueurs like Campari, Amaro Ramazzotti, and Fernet Branca.

== See also ==
- Italian cuisine
- Lombard cuisine

== Bibliography ==
- Apicius, Marcus Gavius (1936). De re coquinaria [Cooking and Dining in Imperial Rome] (in Italian).
- Arrighi, Cletto (2019). Dizionario milanese-italiano [Milanese-Italian Dictionary] (in Italian). Milan: Hoepli.
- Artusi, Pellegrino (1891). La scienza in cucina e l'arte di mangiar bene [Science in the Kitchen and the Art of Eating Well] (PDF) (in Italian).
- Banfi, Giuseppe (1870). Vocabolario milanese-italiano [Milanese-Italian Vocabulary] (in Italian). Milan: G. Brigola.
- Bortolotti, Luigi; Casolo, Beppe; Caricato, Luigi; Castagno, Armando; Castelletti, Alessia; Cogliati, Samuel; Chiappa, Marco; Gallesi, Ezio; Gatti, Marco; Gilioli, Davide; Grignaffini, Andrea; Guiggi, Camilla; Grassullo, Gabriella; Maestrelli, Maurizio; Merlo, Gabriele; Ranucci, Ilaria; Savoia, Simone; P. Schieppati, Alberto; Talamona, Giordana; Valenti, Leonardo (2015). Viniplus di Lombardia - N°8 Marzo 2015 [Viniplus of Lombardy - N°8 March 2015] (in Italian).
- Capatti, Alberto (2000). La cucina italiana: Storia di una cultura [Italian Cuisine: History of a Culture] (in Italian). Rome: Laterza. ISBN 9788842061748.
- Capis, Giovanni (1606). Varon milanes de la lengua de milan, e prissian de milan de la parnonzia milanesa [Milanese Man of the Milan Language, and Milanese Priest of the Milanese Parish] (in Italian). Milan. Archived from the original on 3 March 2016.
- Carrieri, Raffaele (1945). Milano 1865-1915 [Milan 1865-1915] (in Italian). Milan: Edizioni della Chimera, stampa.
- Cherubini, Francesco (1843). Vocabolario milanese-italiano [Milanese-Italian Vocabulary] (in Italian). Milan: Stamperia Reale.
- da la Riva, Bonvesin (1288). De magnalibus urbis Mediolani [The Wonders of the City of Milan] (in Italian).
- de Como, Martino (1465). Libro de Arte Coquinaria [Book of Culinary Art] (PDF) (in Italian). University of Marburg, Germany.
- Domus, Editoriale (1950). Il Cucchiaio d'Argento [The Silver Spoon] (in Italian). Milan.
- Fontana, Giuseppe (1938). Ode al panettone [Ode to Panettone] (in Italian).
- Fontana, Giuseppe (1967). Cusinna de Milan [Milanese Kitchen] (in Italian). Casa del libro.
- Guatteri, Fabiano (2004). La cucina milanese [Milanese Cuisine] (in Italian). Milan: Hoepli.
- Perna Bozzi, Ottorina (1985). Vecchia Milano in cucina [Old Milan in the Kitchen] (in Italian). Firenze: Giunti Martello.
- Porta, Carlo (1879). Poesie milanesi con alcune inedite di Carlo Porta e Tommaso Grossi [Milanese Poems with Some Unpublished Works by Carlo Porta and Tommaso Grossi] (in Italian). Florence: Tip. Guigoni. p. 574.
- Sagliani, Ermanno (1991). Lombardia. La tradizione gastronomica italiana [Lombardy. Italian Gastronomic Tradition] (in Italian). Lombardy: Sipiel. ISBN 9788838002007.
- Guida d'Italia - Milano [Italy Guide - Milan] (in Italian). Milan: Italian Touring Club. 1985. ISBN 9788836500048.
- Enciclopedia di Milano [Encyclopedia of Milan] (in Italian). Franco Maria Ricci Editore. 1997.
