= Domenico Barbaia =

Italian opera impresario (1777–1841)

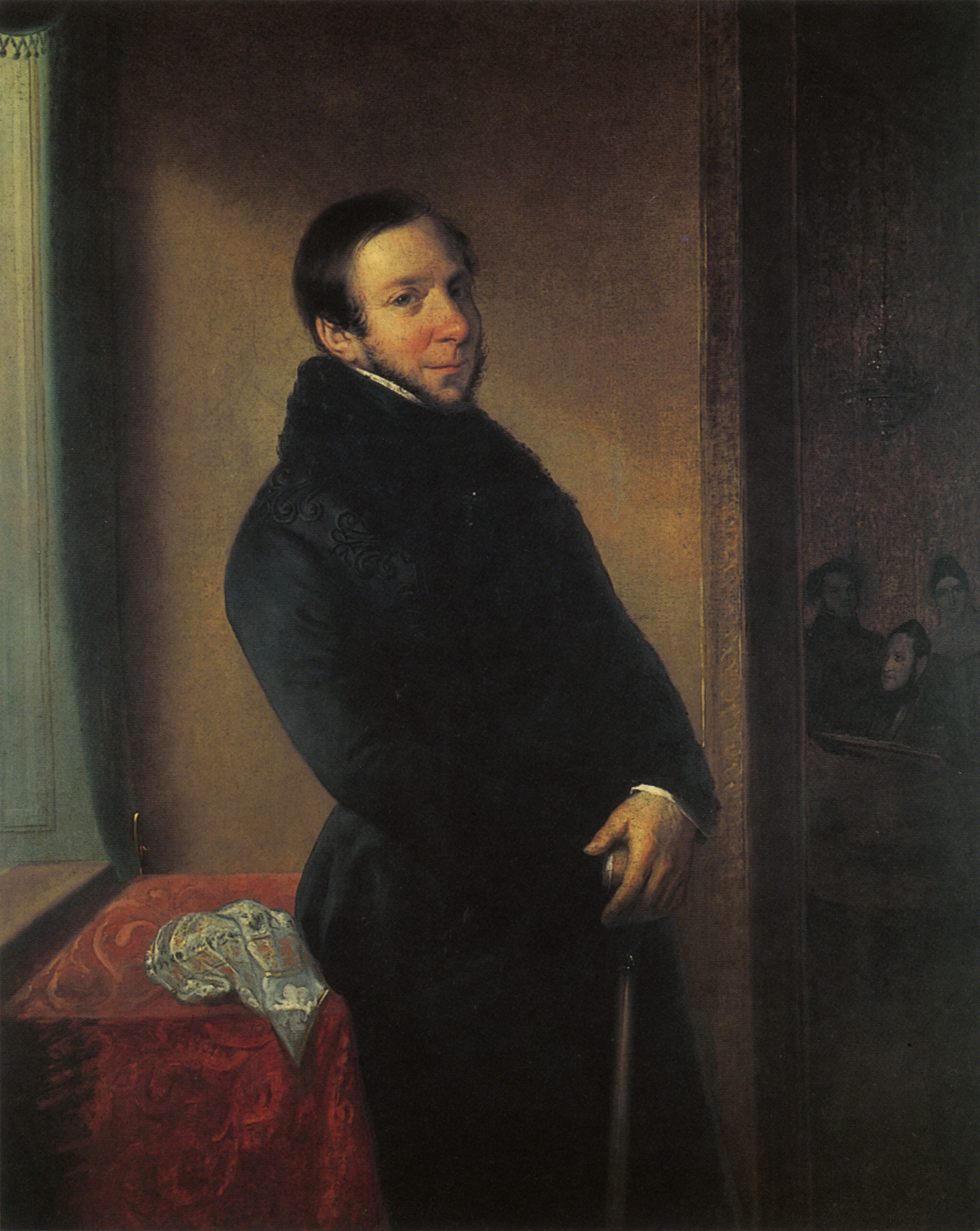
Domenico Barbaja in Naples in the 1820s

Domenico Barbaia (also spelled Barbaja; 10 August 1777 – 19 October 1841) was best known as an opera Italian impresario.

An energetic man, Barbaia, who was born in Milan, began his career by running a coffee shop. He made his first fortune by creating (or at least taking the credit for creating) a special kind of coffee with frothing milk, the "Barbajada", probably the first "cappuccino." This drink, and a variation with hot chocolate like Bicerin, became so popular in Milan that the erstwhile waiter was able to open a string of coffee houses in the city that all featured his novel concoction.

Barbaia made his second fortune by buying and selling munitions during the Napoleonic wars. Also, after the French re-allowed gambling as they advanced southwards in Italy, he became involved in the operations as a card dealer at the La Scala opera house, but quickly achieved the position of sub-contractor to run the entire gaming operation of the house in 1805. With his eyes on controlling gambling opportunities further south in Italy as the French armies advanced, taking over the concession in Naples quickly became his preoccupation. In 1806 he arrived in the city.

By 1809 he was successful enough to take over the royal Teatro San Carlo, the major opera house, as well as the second royal theatre, the Nuovo, and two additional ones until 1824, and lived in the Palazzo Barbaja in the quartiere San Ferdinando. From 1821 he was also the manager of two theatres in Vienna, the Theater am Kärntnertor and the Theater an der Wien. In 1826 he took over the running of La Scala before returning to Naples.

Among the works he commissioned were operas by Gaetano Donizetti, Vincenzo Bellini, and Carl Maria von Weber. In 1815, he offered Gioacchino Rossini a contract lasting seven seasons, and the composer obliged with ten operas, including Otello, Armida, Mosè in Egitto, Ermione, La donna del lago and Maometto II. Among the singers in Barbaia's company for whom Rossini wrote a number of roles during this period were the tenors Giovanni David and Andrea Nozzari, the bass Michele Benedetti and the great mezzo-soprano Isabella Colbran. The latter was Barbaia's lover for a time; eventually, though, she left him for Rossini.

He died in Posillipo in 1841.
