= Ladyfingers (biscuits) =

Type of sponge cake

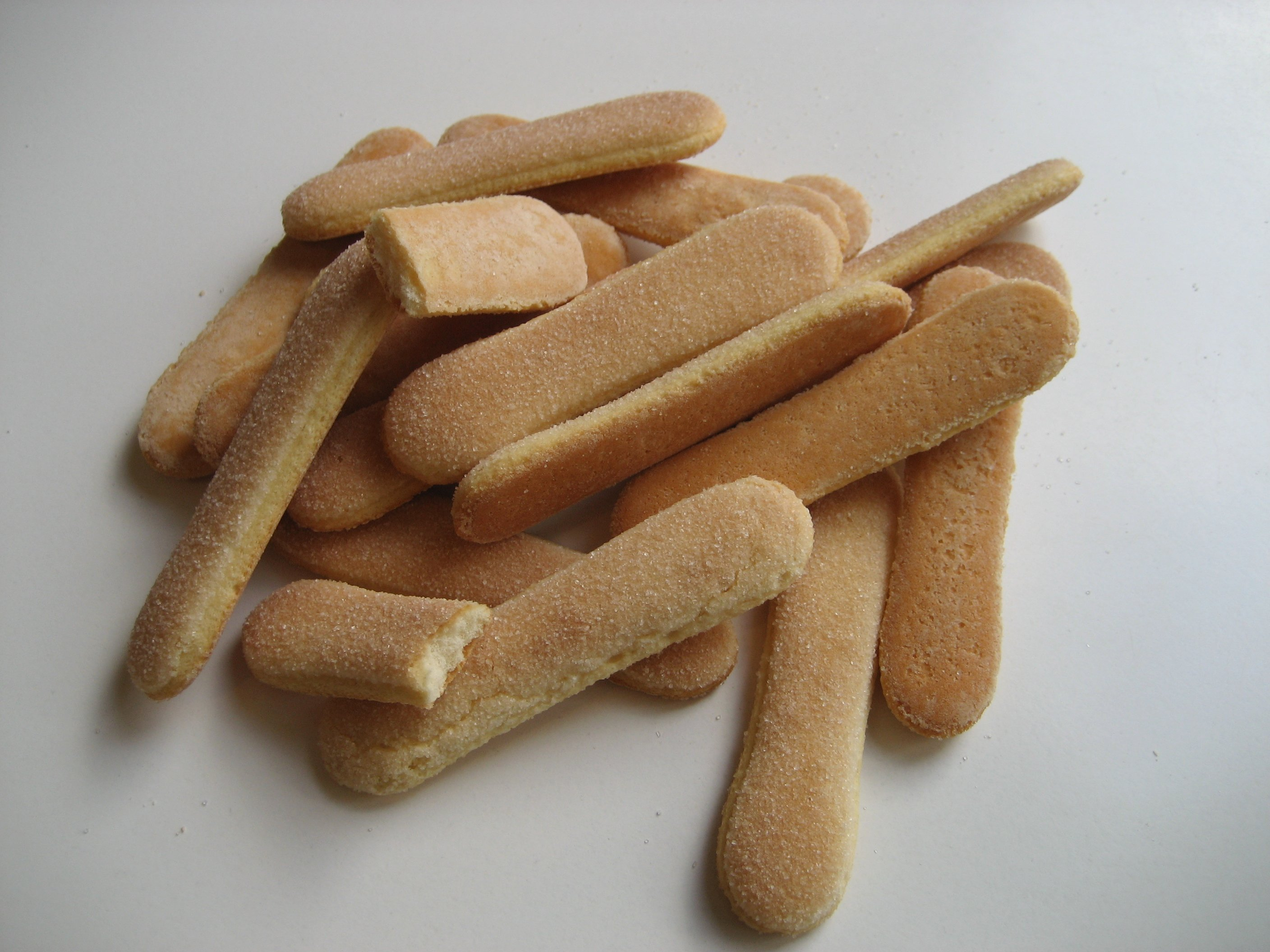
- Alternative names: Naples biscuits, sponge fingers, savoiardi (Italian), boudoirs (French)
- Type: Biscuit
- Course: Dessert
- Region or state: County of Savoy
- Created by: 14th-century official cuisine of the County of Savoy (may antedate in vernacular cuisine)
- Main ingredients: Flour, egg whites, egg yolks, sugar, powdered sugar

Ladyfingers or Naples biscuits, in British English sponge fingers, also known by the Italian name savoiardi (Italian: [savoˈjardi]) or by the French name boudoirs (French: [budwaʁ]), are low-density, dry, egg-based, sweet sponge cake biscuits roughly shaped like large fingers. They are a principal ingredient in many dessert recipes, such as trifles and charlottes, and are also used as fruit or chocolate gateau linings, and for the sponge element of tiramisu. They are typically soaked in a sugar syrup or liqueur, or in espresso for tiramisu.

== History ==
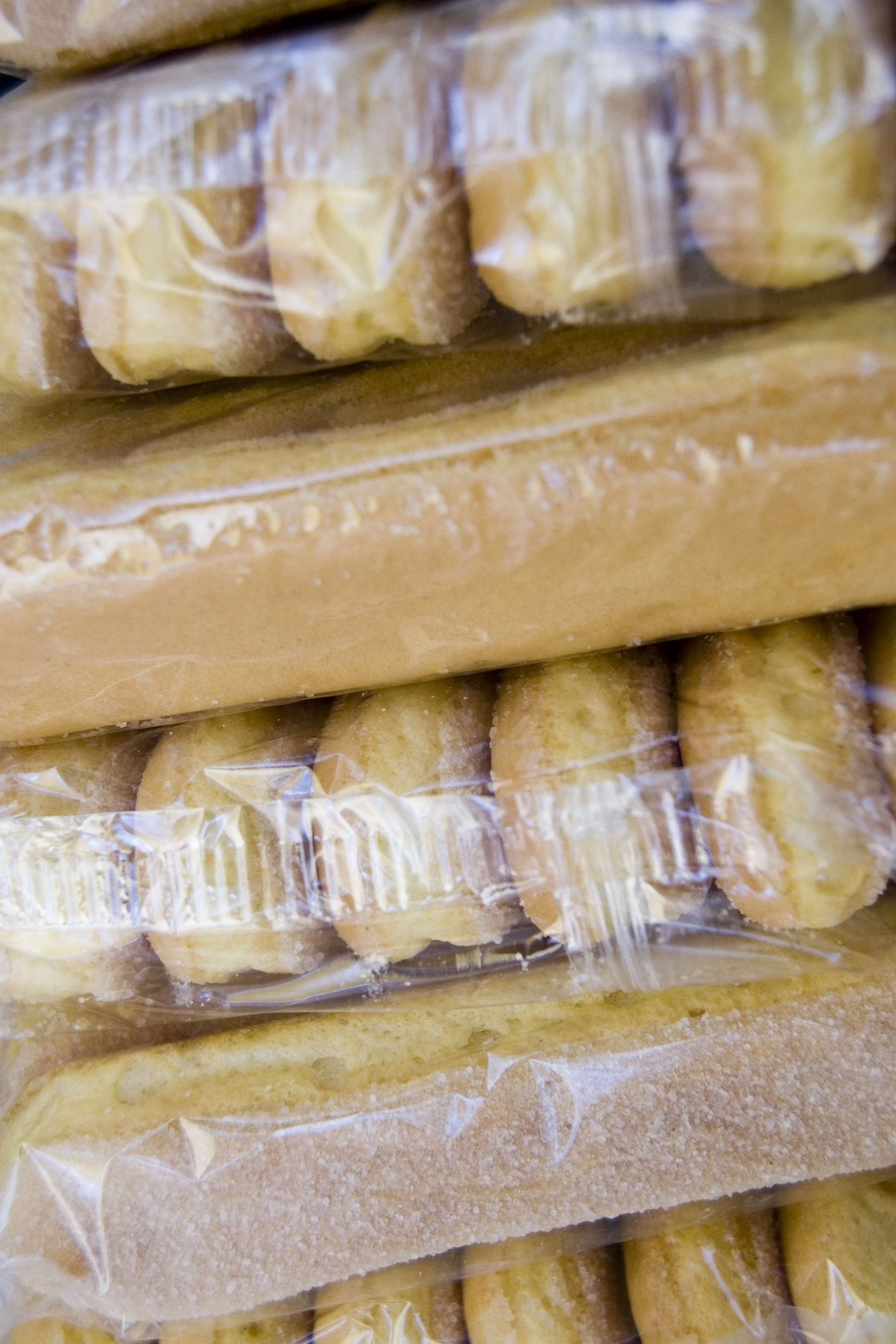
Ladyfingers in transparent plastic packages

Ladyfingers are said to have originated in the 14th century at the court of the County of Savoy, and were created to mark the occasion of a visit by the King of France. They were particularly appreciated by the younger members of the court and offered to visitors as an example of the local cuisine.

== Preparation ==
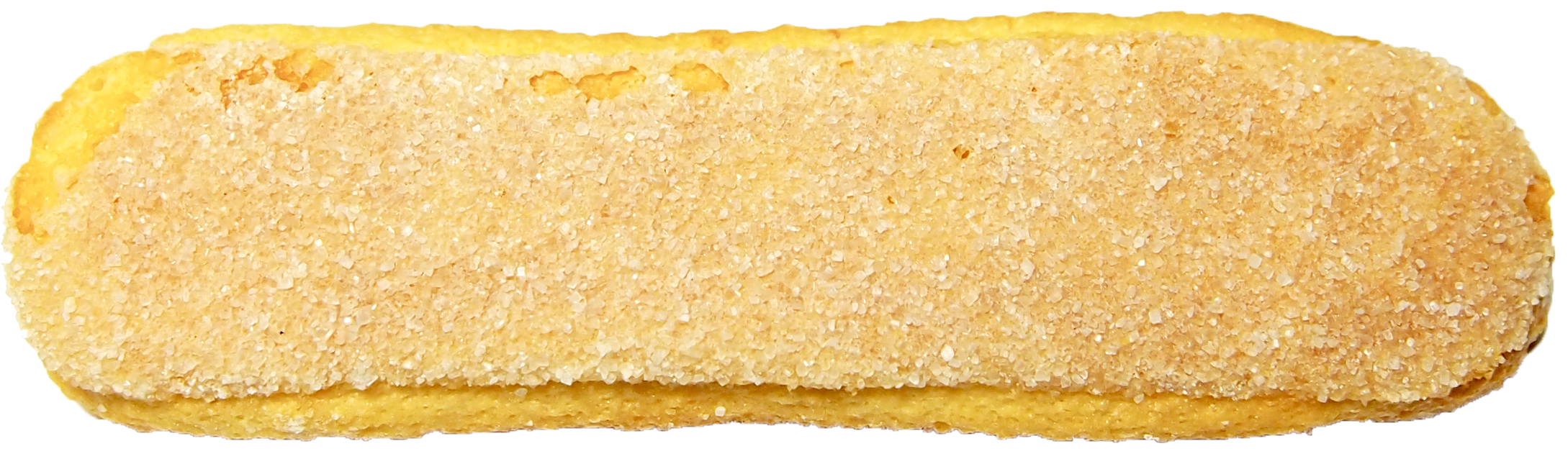
Close-up view of a Vicenzovo-brand Italian savoiardi

Like other sponge cakes, ladyfingers traditionally contain no chemical leavening agent, and rely on air incorporated into the eggs for their "sponge" texture. Some brands, however, contain ammonium bicarbonate. The egg whites and egg yolks mixed with sugar are typically beaten separately and folded together with flour. They contain more flour than the typical sponge cake. The mixture is piped through a pastry bag in short lines onto sheets, giving the biscuits their notable shape.

Before baking, powdered sugar is usually sifted over the top to give a soft crust. The finished ladyfingers are usually layered into a dessert such as tiramisu or trifle.

== See also ==
Media related to Ladyfingers (biscuits) at Wikimedia Commons Lady Finger Cookies (Savoiardi) at the Wikibooks Cookbook subproject

- Tiramisu
