= Tiramisu =

Italian dessert

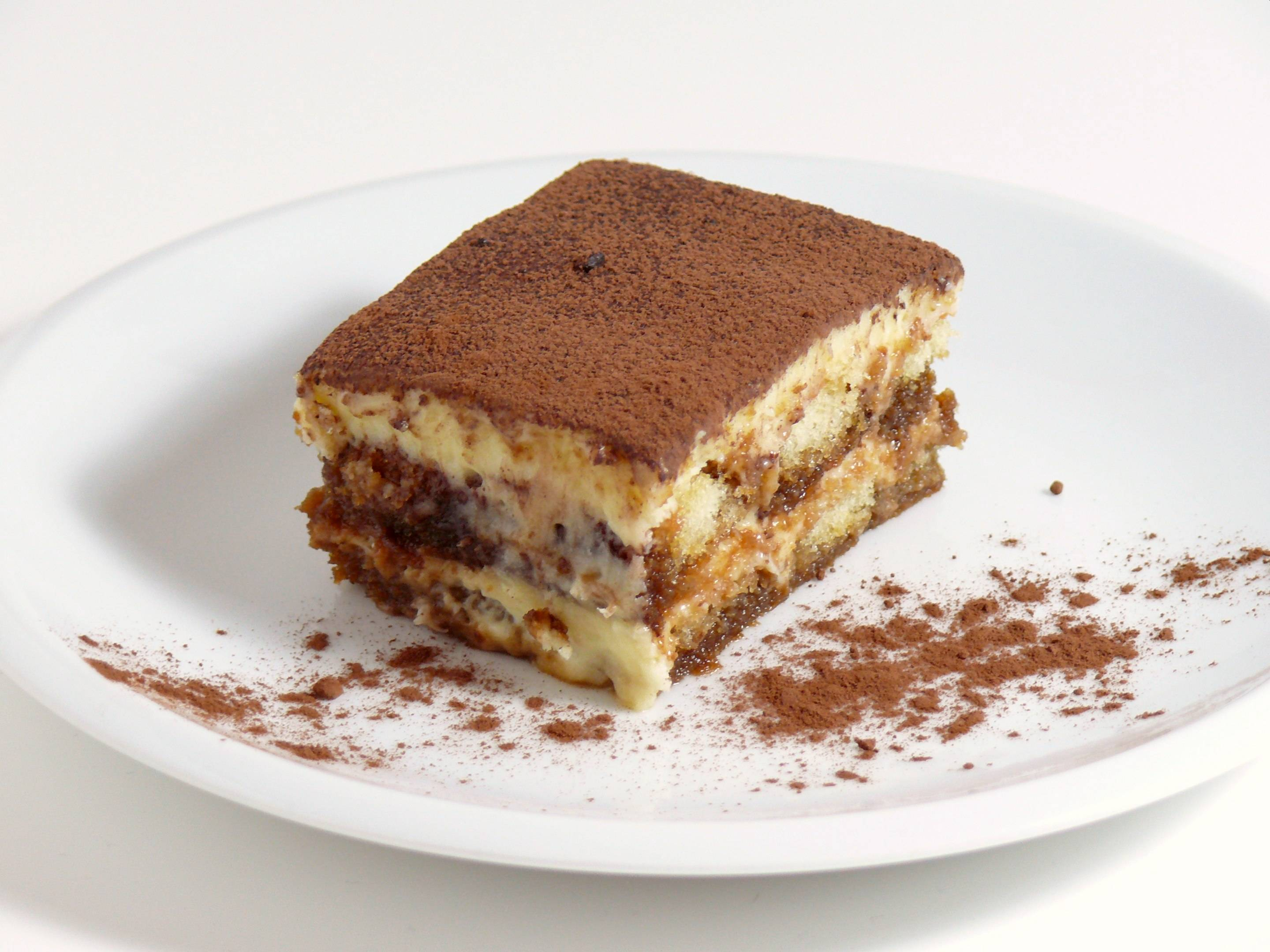
- Alternative names: Tiramisù (Italian), tiramesù (Venetian)
- Course: Dessert
- Place of origin: Italy
- Region or state: Veneto; Friuli-Venezia Giulia
- Serving temperature: Cold
- Main ingredients: Savoiardi, coffee (regular or espresso), egg yolks, mascarpone, cocoa powder, Marsala wine (in some variations), sugar

Tiramisu (Note: UK: /ˌtɪrəmɪˈsuː/ TIRR-ə-miss-OO, US: /ˌtɪrəˈmiːsuː/ TIRR-ə-MEE-soo; Italian: tiramisù [ˌtiramiˈsu]; Venetian: tiramesù [ˌtiɾameˈsu].) is an Italian dessert made with coffee-soaked ladyfingers (savoiardi) covered with a cream of egg yolks, sugar, mascarpone, and cocoa powder. It originated in northeastern Italy, and modern versions were popularized in restaurants from the 1970s. Tiramisu has become one of the most internationally recognised Italian desserts and has inspired many variations in home and professional cooking. The name comes from the Italian tirami su, meaning 'pick me up' or 'cheer me up'.

== History ==
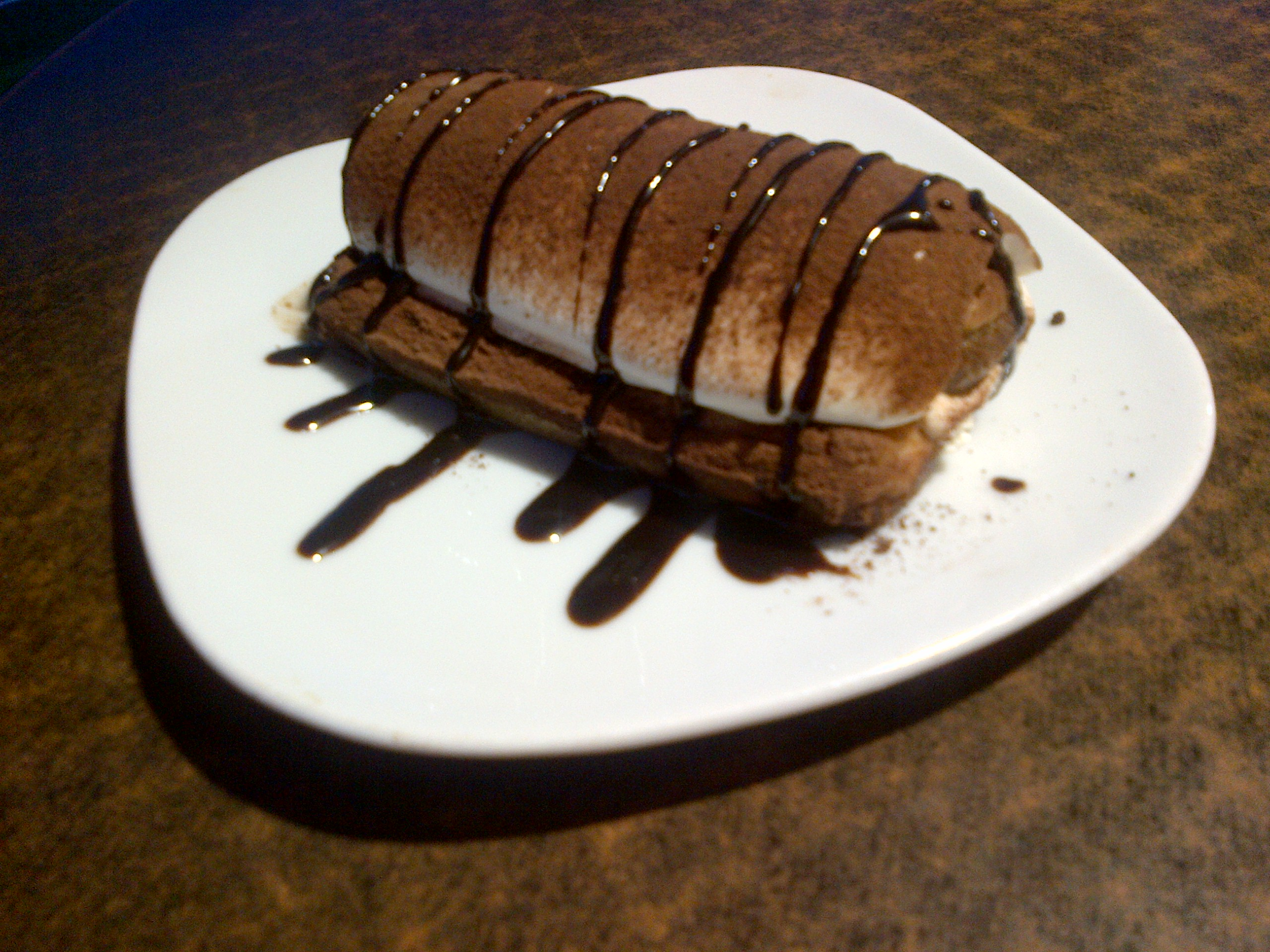
Tiramisu in Naples, Italy

The origin of Tiramisu is disputed. Some believe the recipe was derived from sbatudin, a simpler dish made of egg yolks and sugar that was often served with biscuits. Others argue it originated from another dish, dolce Torino. Alternatively, it may have originated as a variation of another layered dessert, zuppa inglese. Others claim it was created toward the end of the 17th century in Siena in honour of Grand Duke Cosimo III.

The earliest known attestation of the name tirame su concerns the Al Vetturino restaurant in Pieris, in the Gorizia area. From 1939, Mario Cosolo (1913–1986) served there a dessert originally called Coppa Vetturino that was made with cream, sponge cake and Marsala instead of mascarpone and coffee. The dessert was derived from a preparation that, according to documentation held by the Consorzio culturale del Monfalconese, he had developed in 1935 while working as a cook in a ship for Victor Emmanuel III. The dessert was reportedly renamed Tirime su in 1945, taking its name from a humorous expression uttered by a customer. The chronology of the Fondo Mario Cosolo records, in 1948, the first photograph in which an advertising poster bearing the name of the dessert is clearly visible; a better-known photograph, taken in 1950 during the wedding reception of boxer Tiberio Mitri and Fulvia Franco, shows the same poster with the phrase “Il Tirime su creato da Mario vale più di quel che costa” (“Mario’s Tirime su is worth more than it costs”). In October 1975, the magazine La buona tavola described Cosolo’s preparation as a precursor to a family of desserts known as “tirame su” that were served in Friulian trattorias.

The modern tiramisu recipe is not found in cookbooks before the 1960s. It is mentioned in a Sydney Morning Herald restaurant column published in 1978. It is not mentioned in encyclopaedias and dictionaries of the 1970s, first appearing in an Italian dictionary in 1980, and in English in 1982. It is mentioned in a 1983 cookbook devoted to cooking of the Veneto region.

Obituaries for the restaurateur Ado Campeol (1928–2021) reported that the dessert currently known as tiramisu was invented at his restaurant Le Beccherie in Treviso on 24 December 1969 by his wife Alba di Pillo (1929–2021) and the pastry chef Roberto Linguanotto (1943–2024). Tiramisu was added to its menu in 1972. At the time of his death in July 2024, the Le Beccherie restaurant credited Linguanotto as the creator of tiramisu.

It has been claimed that tiramisu has aphrodisiac effects and was concocted by a 19th-century Treviso brothel madam, as the Accademia Del Tiramisù explains, to "solve the problems they may have had with their conjugal duties on their return to their wives".

On 29 July 2017, tiramisu was entered by the Ministry of Agricultural, Food and Forestry Policies on the list of traditional Friulian and Giulian agri-food products in the Friuli-Venezia Giulia region. In 2013, Luca Zaia, President of Veneto, sought European Union protected status certification, based on the ingredients used in 1970, so substitute ingredients, such as strawberries, could not be used in a dish called tiramisu.

== Ingredients ==
Traditional tiramisu contains ladyfingers (savoiardi), egg yolks, sugar, coffee, mascarpone, and cocoa powder. Several of these components were already well established in Italian domestic cooking. Savoiardi were commonly used in traditional desserts and spoon cakes, while egg-based creams such as zabaglione have a long culinary history in northern Italy. Coffee was also used in combination with egg-based creams in Italian pastry by the late 19th century, as shown in Sorbiatti's recipes (1873). Cocoa powder was likewise employed in northern Italian home pastry by the late 19th century. Mascarpone, by contrast, represents the relatively more recent component that characterizes the dessert in its contemporary version. The modern stabilized variety of mascarpone became more widely available in northern Italy only in the early 20th century, with documented industrial production in the province of Treviso as early as 1933 through the Mascherpone Valmarino trademark. Previous historical uses of the term mascarpone may not have corresponded to the modern dairy cream produced by acid-heat coagulation of cream.

== Variations ==
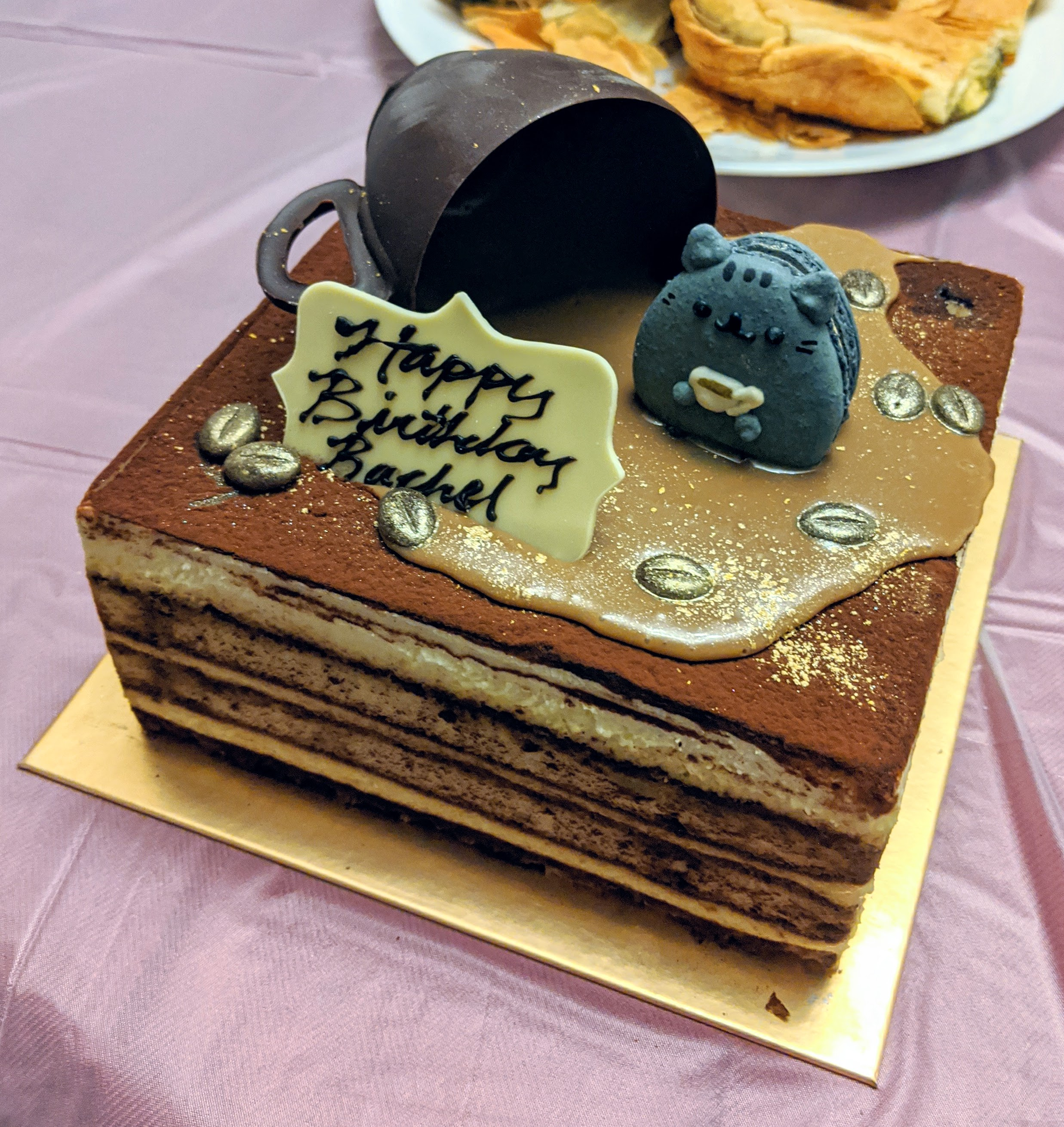
Tiramisu birthday cake

The original tiramisu served at Le Beccherie was round. Modern versions are often made in a rectangular or square pan, making it easier to arrange the biscuits.

A common variation is to add alcohol to the coffee that the savoiardi are soaked in. Common choices include coffee-flavoured liqueurs such as Tia Maria and Kahlúa, Marsala wine, amaretto, dark rum, Madeira, port, brandy, Malibu or Irish cream.

Modern versions sometimes have whipped cream or whipped egg whites, or both, combined with mascarpone. This makes the dish lighter, thick and foamy. Another variation involves the preparation of the cream with eggs heated just enough to pasteurize the mixture without scrambling the eggs. The cake is usually eaten cold.

Numerous variations of tiramisu exist. Many replace the coffee with other ingredients such as chocolate, amaretto, lemon, strawberry, pineapple, yoghurt, banana, raspberry, and coconut. Some cooks use other cakes or sweet, yeasted bread, such as panettone, in place of the ladyfingers. Bakers living in different Italian regions often debate the use and structural qualities of utilising other types of cookies, such as pavesini for instance, in the recipe.

== See also ==
- List of coffee dishes
- List of Italian desserts and pastries
