= Mascarpone =

Italian cream cheese

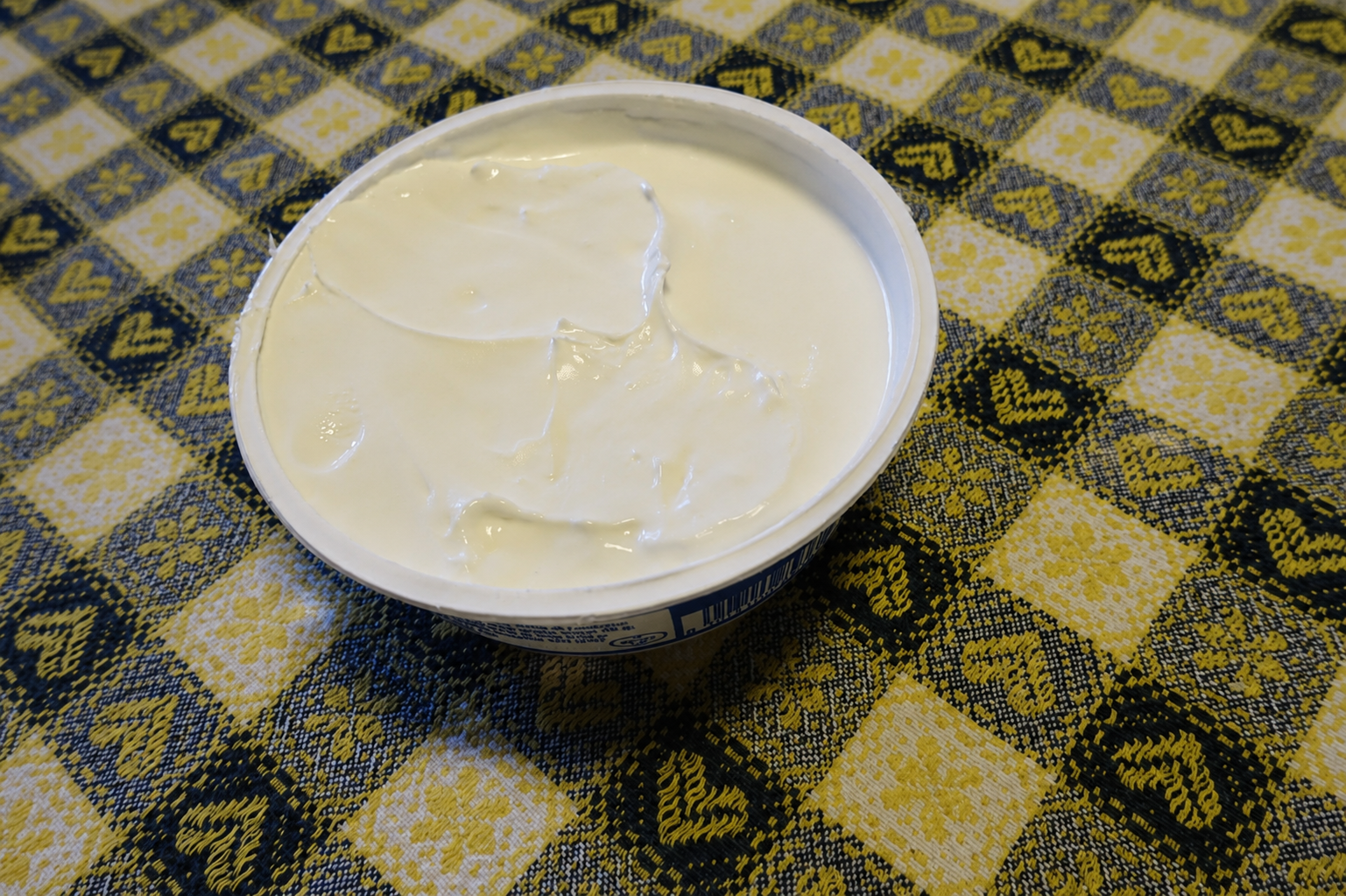
- Country of origin: Italy
- Town: Lodi, Lombardy
- Source of milk: Cow
- Pasteurized: No
- Texture: Soft

Mascarpone (/ˌmæskɑːrˈpoʊn(eɪ), -ni/, US also /ˌmɑːsk-/; (Note: In English, mascarpone is sometimes mispronounced as if spelled "marscapone", even by food professionals.) Italian: [maskarˈpoːne]) is a soft Italian dairy product obtained by acid-heat coagulation of cream. It is a dairy cream, not a cheese in the technical sense, as it is made without rennet and does not undergo true curd formation. It is recognized as a prodotto agroalimentare tradizionale (PAT).

== Production process ==
After denaturation of cream, the whey is removed without pressing or aging. Mascarpone may also be made using cream and the residual tartaric acid from the bottom or sides of barreled wine.

The traditional method is to add 2.4g of tartaric acid powder into 10g of hot water, then add the acid solution into 1000g of heavy cream at a temperature of 350K to 360K, and finally cook at a temperature of 350K to 360K for 5 minutes. The mixture is allowed to cool to room temperature before it is poured into a cheesecloth-lined colander, set into a shallow pan or dish, strained, and chilled for at least 6 hours.

== Origins ==
Popularly, the name is held to derive from mascarpa, an unrelated milk product made from the whey of stracchino (a young, barely aged cheese), or from mascarpia, a word in the local dialect for ricotta. Unlike ricotta, which is made from whey, mascarpone is made from cream.

According to the Lombard journalist and writer Gianni Brera, the original form of the name should rather be "mascherpone", deriving, in his view, from Cascina Mascherpa, an unidentified locality situated in the lower Po Valley on the border between the provinces of Lodi, Milan and Pavia. Mascherpa, a dialect term of uncertain etymology that means “ricotta”, is also a widespread surname in the same geographic area.

This interpretation is consistent with one of the earliest official attestations of the product name outside Lombardy, dating to 1933–1934, when the dairy of Cison di Valmarino (Treviso), owned by Count Gerolamo Brandolini d’Adda and directed by Remo Dolce, registered the trademark "Mascherpone Valmarino" with the Ministry of Corporations and with the Intellectual Property Office of Treviso (trademark no. 48371). The registration, made public through local archival and journalistic sources, testifies to the start of production and commercial distribution in the Treviso area already in the early twentieth century. As highlighted by recent food-historical reconstructions, it is described as a cream-based, acid-set dairy product already at that time.

Previous historical uses of the term “mascarpone” may not have corresponded to the modern dairy cream produced by acid-heat coagulation of cream.

== Uses ==
Mascarpone is milky-white in colour and is easy to spread. It is used in various Lombardy dishes and is considered a specialty in the region.

Mascarpone is one of the main ingredients in tiramisu. Sometimes it is used instead of, or along with, butter or Parmesan cheese to thicken and enrich risotto. Mascarpone is also used in cheesecake recipes.

Mascarpone is also commonly used in the UK on pizzas with prosciutto and mushrooms.

== See also ==
- List of Italian cheeses
- List of dairy products
- Italian cuisine
- Cream cheese
